= Oniiwa Park =

Park in Gifu Prefecture, Japan

- 鬼岩公園
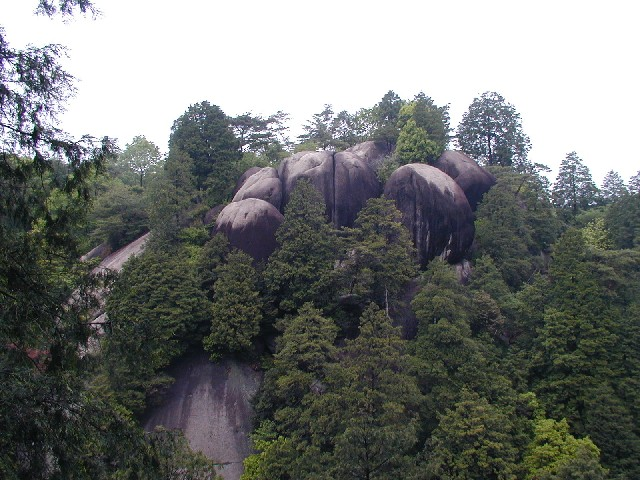
- Lotus Flower Rock (蓮華岩, Renge-iwa) at Oniiwa Park

- Location within Gifu Prefecture
- Location: Mitake and Mizunami, Gifu
- Coordinates: 35°24′45.08″N 137°11′56.86″E
- Open: All year
- Website: http://www.oniiwaonsen.com/kouenannai.htm

Oniiwa Park (鬼岩公園, Oniiwa Kōen) is a park on the border of Mitake, Kani District and Mizunami in Gifu Prefecture, Japan. It is located in Hida-Kisogawa Quasi-National Park. Oniiwa is a Japanese government designated Place of Scenic Beauty and Natural Monument.

== Overview ==
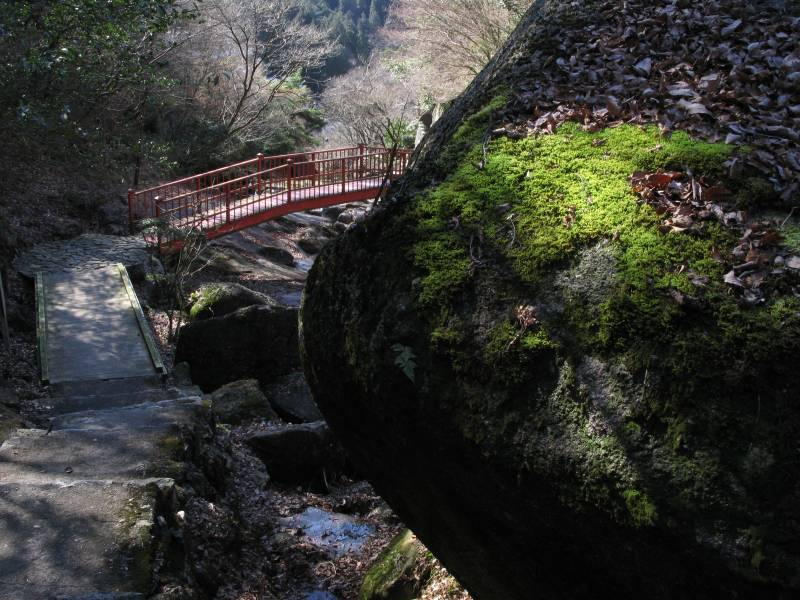
Footbridge and boulder at Oniiwa Park

It is located near the source of the Kani River, a tributary of the Kiso River. It has massive granite rocks that have been eroded over a period of millions of years. There are also many rhododendrons and Japanese maples, and it is a famous spot for foliage in autumn (Note: In 2004, it was voted by prefectural residents and tourists to be in the "33 Famous Places for Foliage".). Near the Eboshi-iwa (烏帽子岩) summit, a waterfall will appear a few times a year after heavy rainfall.

Oniiwa Onsen, a sulfur and uranium mineral spring, is nearby.

Matsuno Dam is located at the northeastern entrance to the park. It impounds Matsuno Lake, which is part of Kani River.

It was discovered in 2016 that rock climbing wedges had been driven into rocks at Oniiwa Park within Mitake. The Japan Free Climbing Association, as well as meeting with the town of Mitake, Gifu, and the Agency for Cultural Affairs, performed work on March 27, 2018 to remove the wedges or otherwise to repair the places where the wedges could not be removed.

== Origin of the name "Oniiwa" ==
The legend is that there was a demon named Seki no Tarō (関の太郎) who lived in the area, and so it came to be called Demon Rock (鬼岩, Oniiwa). Seki no Tarō lived around the year 1200, and terrorized residents and travelers on the Tōsandō with evil deeds. He was killed by soldiers dispatched under the orders of Emperor Go-Shirakawa. Other than Oniiwa, there are places with names connected to the legend like Demon's Grotto (鬼の岩屋, Oni no Iwaya), where the oni lived, or Demon's Severed Heads Burial Mound (鬼の首塚, Oni no Kubizuka), where the heads of slain oni were buried, as well as Tarō's Rock (太郎岩, Tarō Iwa), Chopping Board Rock (まな板岩, Manaita Iwa), Head-washing Pond (首洗池, Kubiarai Ike) and others.

== Fukuoni Matsuri ==
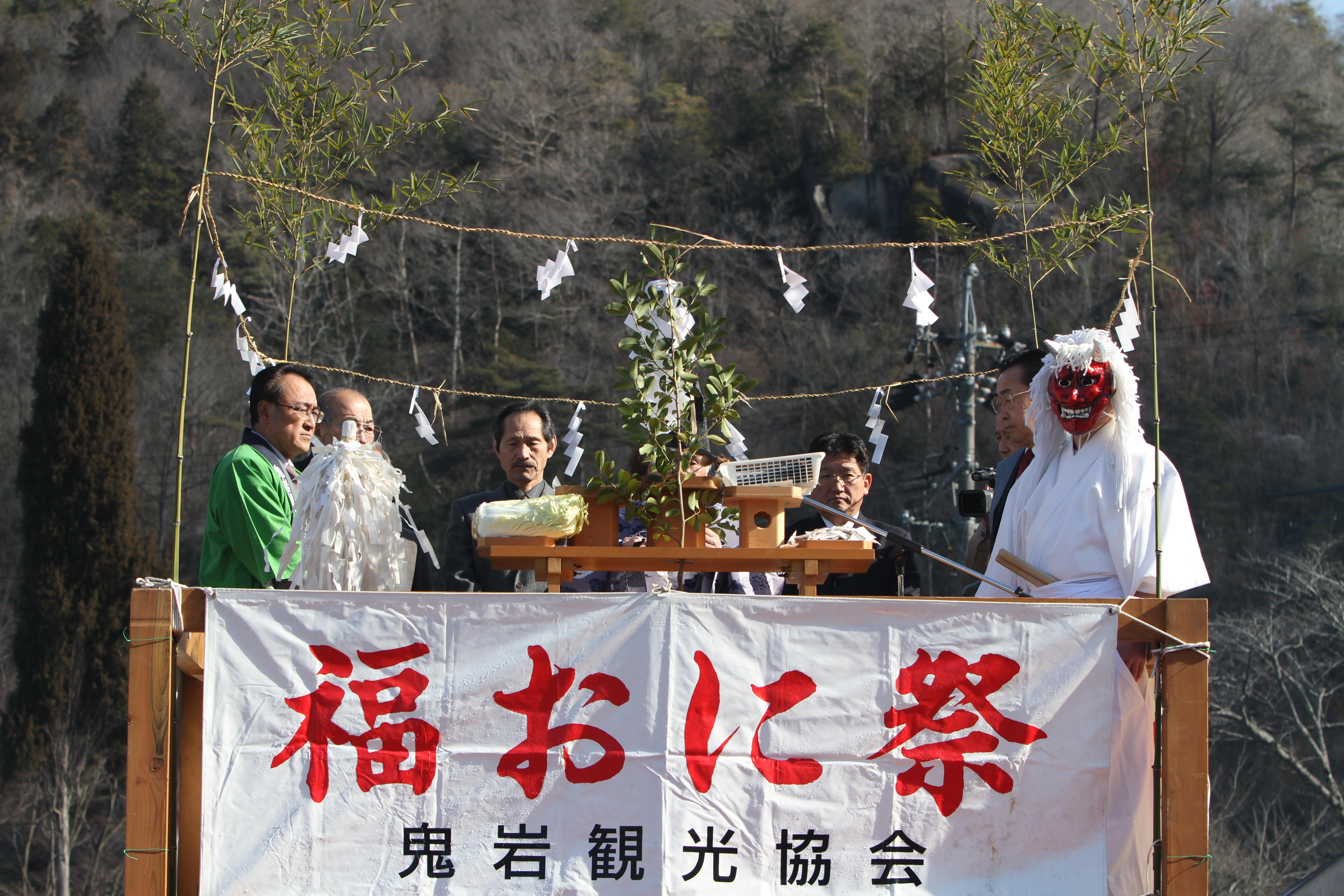
Fukuoni Matsuri

A Setsubun festival that has been held since 1986 on the first Sunday in February, around February 3. The legend goes that Seki no Taro was exorcised and resurrected as a good-luck demon. So that the demons will bring good luck, when scattering beans, instead of the normal chant, everyone says "Demons in! Good luck in!" (鬼は内！福は内！, Oni wa uchi! Fuku wa uchi!).

Media related to Oni-iwa Park at Wikimedia Commons

== Goshuin ==
Planned by the Gifu Community Development Association's Hitohito Association. As of November 2019 Oniiwa Park is one of 13 places (Note: Kogane Shrine, Gyokushoin, Gifu Nobunaga Shrine (Kenkun Shrine), Kobuji, Osshinji, Inaba Shrine, Gifu Castle, Tenryū-ji (Kani), Seki Zenkō-ji, Gokokushi-ji, Shinchoji, Oniiwa Park, Gujō Hachiman Castle.) that have "Golden Goshuin". These are special goshuin decorated with gold that are only available on the last Friday of each month, or "Premium Friday". They are issued at the goshuin booth in Oniiwa Drive-in. It uses a proprietary ink that looks gold from the front and red from the back.

Golden goshuin from Oniiwa Drive-in

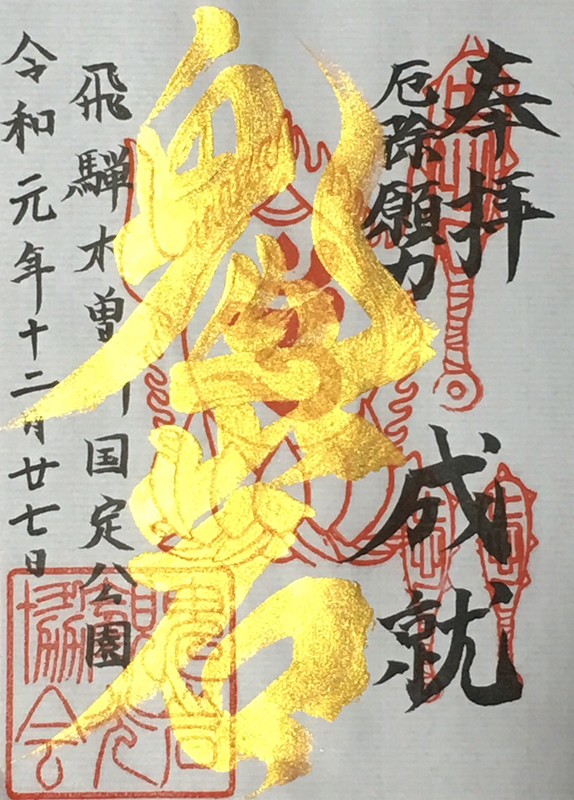
Received December 27, 2019

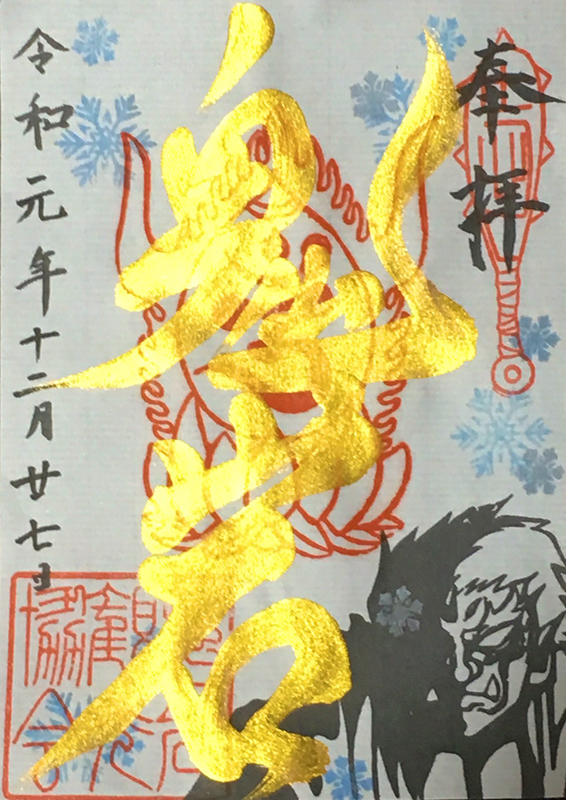
Received December 27, 2019

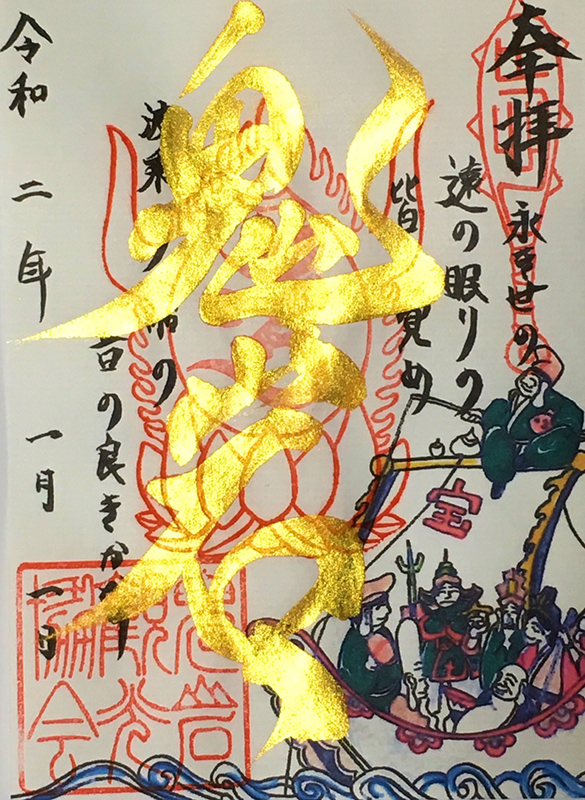
Received January 1, 2020

== Access ==
If by train, take a taxi from either Mitake Station on the Meitetsu Hiromi Line or Tokishi Station on the JR Chūō Main Line. A bus operated by Tohtetsu is no longer running. If by highway, get off the Chūō Expressway at Toki IC or the Tōkai-Kanjō Expressway at Kani-Mitake IC and then to Route 21.

== See also ==
- List of Places of Scenic Beauty of Japan (Gifu)
- Monuments of Japan
