= Motoyashiki Pottery Kiln Site =

Japanese pottery kiln

- 元屋敷陶器窯跡 (Japanese)
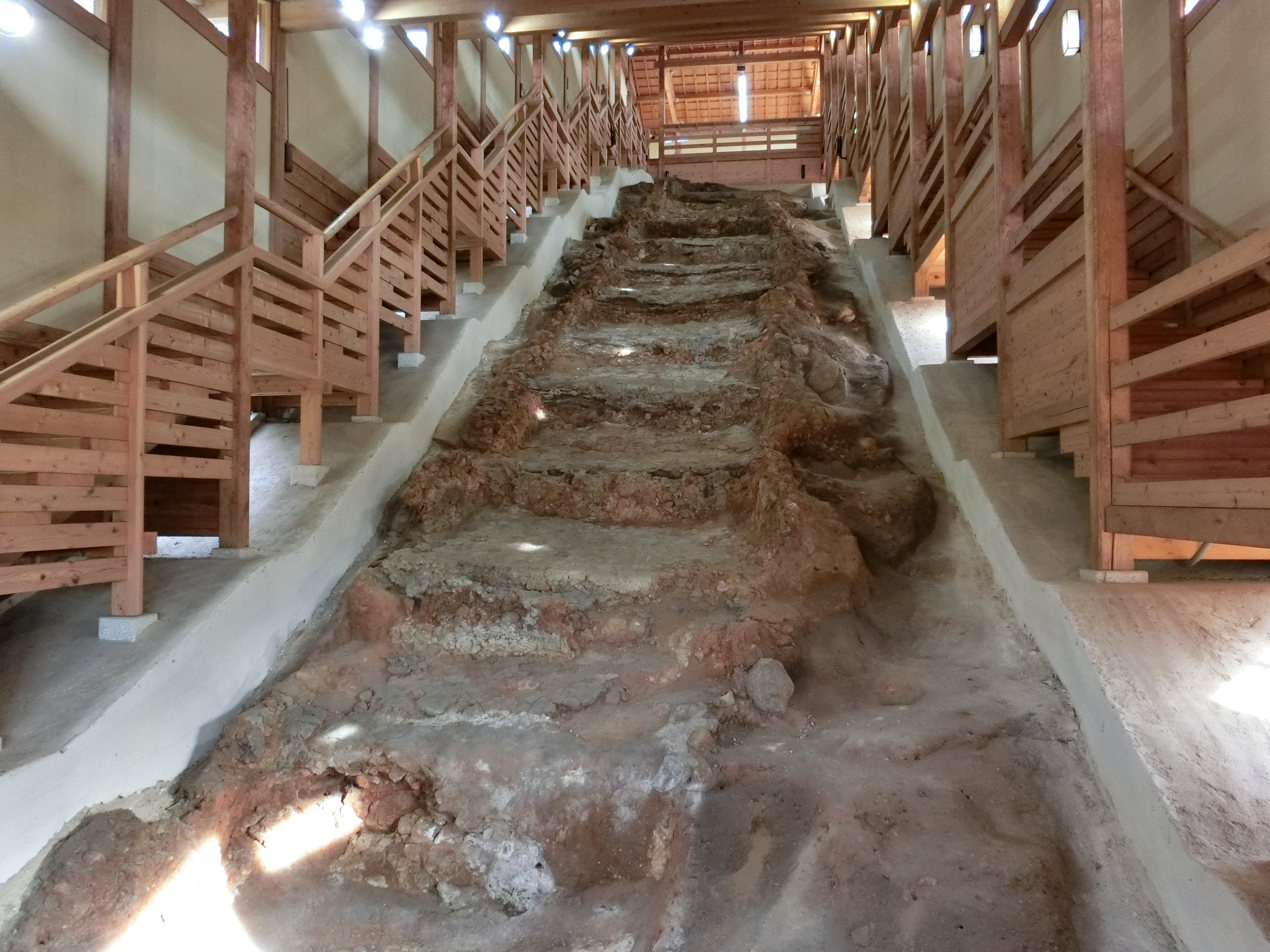
- Motoyashiki Pottery Kiln Site

- Motoyashiki Pottery Kiln Site Motoyashiki Pottery Kiln Site (Japan)
- 35°21′56″N 137°10′34″E
- Periods: Sengoku - Edo
- Location: Toki, Gifu, Japan
- Region: Chubu region

Site notes
- Public access: Yes (park and museum)

The Motoyashiki Pottery Kiln Site (元屋敷陶器窯跡, Motoyashiki tōki kama ato) is an archaeological site containing late Sengoku to early Edo period kilns located in the Izumi neighborhood of the city of Toki, Gifu in the Chūbu region of Japan. The ruins were designated a National Historic Site of Japan in 1967. Many of the pottery shards excavated from this site have been collectively designated as National Treasures or National Important Cultural Property of Japan.

== Overview ==
The Motoyashiki Pottery Kiln site is on a steep south slope facing the valley of the Tanigawa River north of Tokishi Station, and consists of one large and three smaller kilns. The large kiln is an noborigama with a total length of 24 meters. It was constructed in the Keichō era (1596 - 1615) by Katō Junpei, a potter from Mino Province who had apprenticed at the Karatsu ware kilns in Kyushu. The large kiln has 14 chambers, each with an average width of 2.2 meters and depth from 0.55 to 1.3 meters, increasing with increasing elevation. The floor is inclined at an angle of between 10 and 20 degrees. From the shards recovered at this site, this kiln was determined to be the origin of Oribe ware pottery.

The Motoyashiki Higashi Kiln No.1 was built in the latter half of the 16th century, and is about four meters wide. This kiln was used to produce Tenmoku tea bowls and other glazed pottery. It has been restored to its original appearance. The Motoyashiki Higashi Kiln No.2 has a total length of 7.5 meters and a width of 3.9 meters, and was built next to the Higashi No. 1 kiln. It appears to have been used for experimentation in new designs such as Setoguro, Kiseto, and Haishino pottery. The Motoyashiki Higashi No. 3 kiln has a remaining length of 5.8 meters and a width of 2.9 meters, and was used for mass-producing Shino ware pottery.

The kilns and surrounding area have been preserved as the Oribe-no-sato Park, and there is an exhibition room for relics excavated at site. The site is about a 15-minute walk from Tokishi Station on the JR East Chūō Main Line.

== Gallery ==
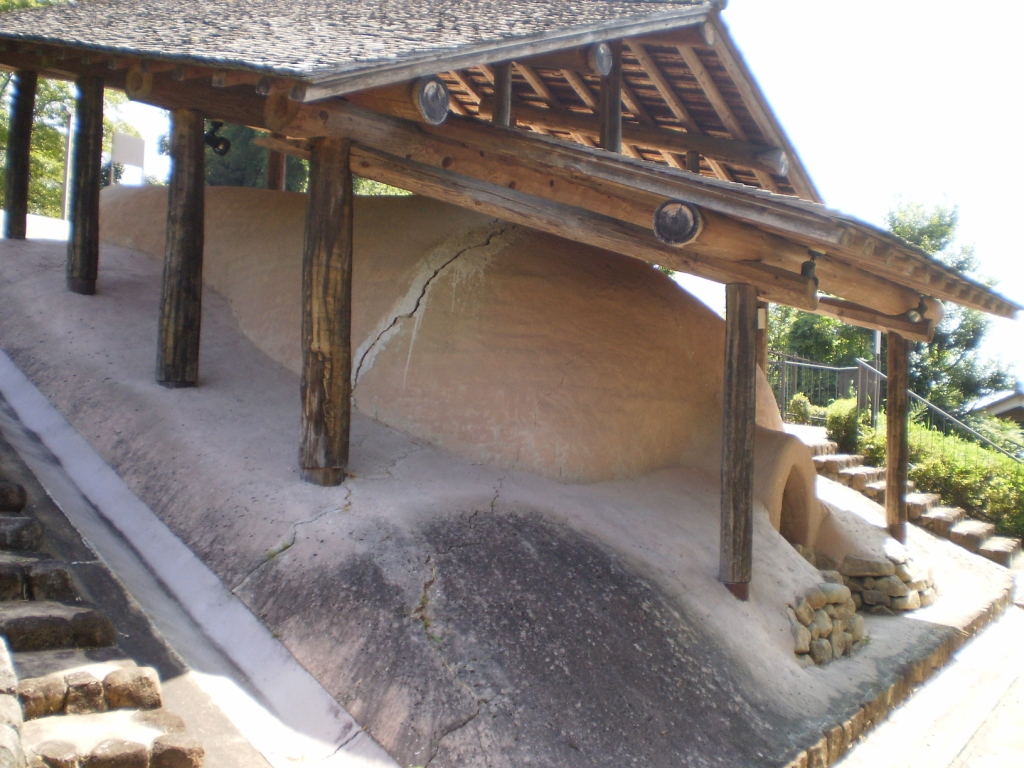
Restored main kiln

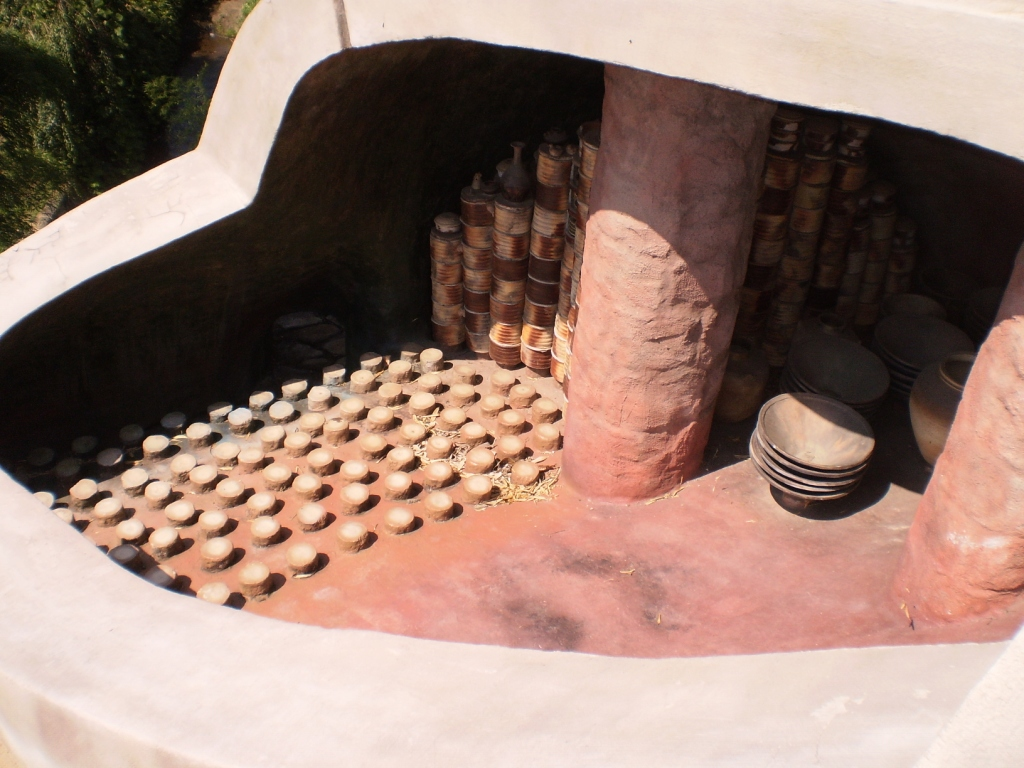
Inside view of restored kiln No.2

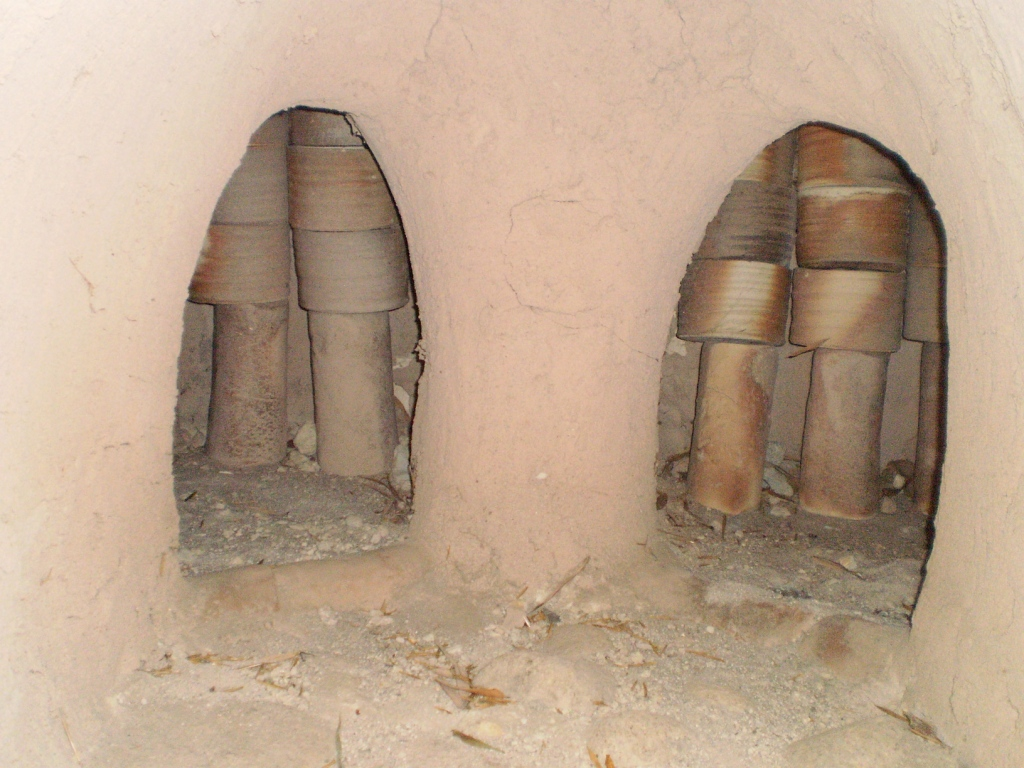
Inside view of restored kiln No.2

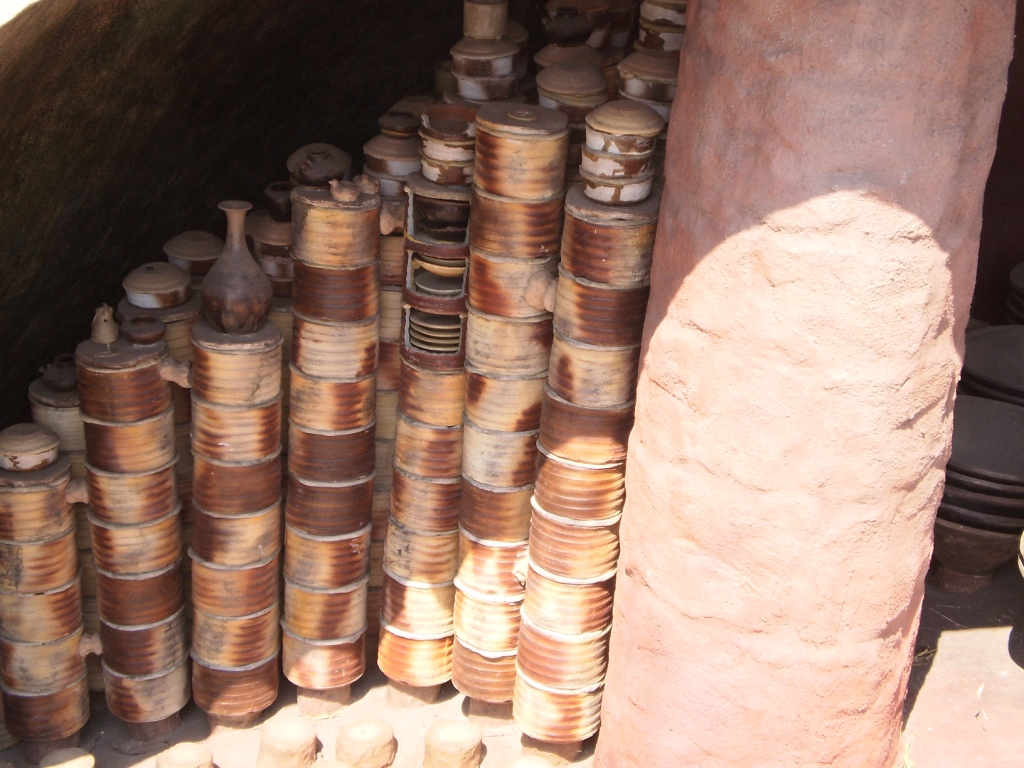
Inside view of restored kiln No.2

== See also ==
- List of Historic Sites of Japan (Gifu)
