= List of places of scenic beauty of Japan (Gifu) =

This list is of the places of scenic beauty of Japan located within the Prefecture of Gifu.

== National Places of Scenic Beauty ==
As of 28 February 2024, eight Places have been designated at a national level; Kiso River spans the prefectural borders with Aichi and Landscape of Oku no Hosomichi is a serial designation spanning twelve prefectures.

Site	Municipality	Comments	Image	Coordinates	Type	Ref.
Eihō-ji Gardens 永保寺庭園; Eihōji teien	Tajimi			35°20′51″N 137°07′49″E	1	
Kamagatani 霞間ヶ渓（サクラ） Kamagatani	Ikeda	also a Natural Monument		35°25′55″N 136°32′57″E	3	
Oni-iwa 鬼岩; Oni-iwa	Mizunami, Mitake	also a Natural Monument		35°24′45″N 137°11′59″E	5, 6	
Tō Family Residence Site Gardens 東氏館跡庭園; Tō-shi yakata ato teien	Gujō			35°48′37″N 136°55′26″E	1	
Ema Family Residence Site Gardens 江馬氏館跡庭園; Ema-shi yakata ato teien	Hida			35°23′28″N 136°43′20″E	1	
Kiso River 木曽川; Kiso-gawa	Kakamigahara, Kani, Sakahogi	designation includes an area of Inuyama in Aichi Prefecture		35°23′49″N 136°57′31″E	6, 10	
Landscape of Oku no Hosomichi おくのほそ道の風景地; Oku no Hosomichi no fūkei-chi	Ōgaki	designation spans twelve prefectures, including one component property in Gifu: Ōgaki Funamachi River Port (大垣船町川湊)		35°21′22″N 136°36′45″E	3, 5, 6, 8, 9, 10	
Shiramizu Falls 白水滝; Shiramizu-no-taki	Shirakawa			36°08′36″N 136°49′31″E		

== Prefectural Places of Scenic Beauty ==
As of 1 February 2024, five Places have been designated at a prefectural level.

Site	Municipality	Comments	Image	Coordinates	Type	Ref.
Utsue 48 Waterfalls 宇津江四十八滝; Utsue shijūhattaki	Takayama			36°11′49″N 137°09′24″E		
Amidagataki Falls 阿弥陀ケ滝; Amidagataki	Gujō			35°57′34″N 136°49′03″E		
Yokotani Valley 4 Falls 横谷峡四つの滝; Yokotani-kyō yotsu-no-taki	Gero			35°40′37″N 137°08′05″E		
Zenshō-ji Gardens 禅昌寺庭園; Zenshōji teien	Gero			35°50′43″N 137°13′45″E		
Shiramizu Falls 白水滝; Shiramizu-no-taki	Shirakawa			36°08′36″N 136°49′31″E		

== Municipal Places of Scenic Beauty ==
As of 1 May 2023, fifty-six Places have been designated at a municipal level.

== Registered Places of Scenic Beauty ==
As of 1 February 2024, one Monument has been registered (as opposed to designated) as a Place of Scenic Beauty at a national level.

Place	Municipality	Comments	Image	Coordinates	Type	Ref.
Sone Family Gardens (Jisō-an Gardens) 曽根氏庭園（磁叟庵庭園） Sone-shi teien (Jisō-an teien)	Mizunami			35°19′15″N 137°19′31″E		

== See also ==
- Cultural Properties of Japan
- List of parks and gardens of Gifu Prefecture
- List of Historic Sites of Japan (Gifu)
