= Tokishi Station =

Tokishi Station is the name of one current and one former train station in Japan.

- Tokishi Station (Gifu) (土岐市駅), a JR Central station in Gifu Prefecture
- Tokishi Station (Aichi) (時志駅), a former station in Aichi Prefecture
