= Fushimi-juku (Nakasendō) =

Pre-modern Japan post-station along highway

Fushimi-juku 伏見宿
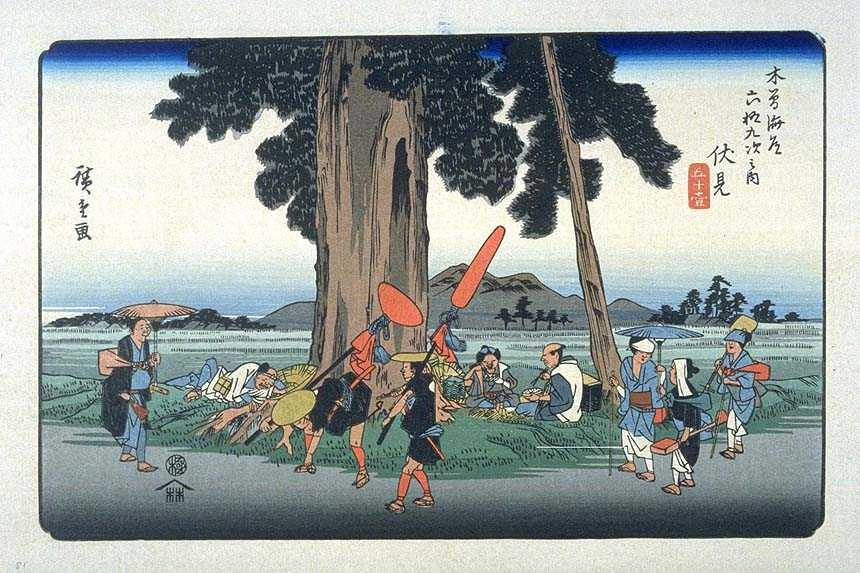
- Hiroshige's print of Fushimi-juku, part of the Sixty-nine Stations of the Kiso Kaidō series

General information
- Location: Mitake, Gifu (former Mino Province); Japan
- Coordinates: 35°26′19.77″N 137°05′08.97″E
- Elevation: 125 m (410 ft)
- System: post station
- Line: Nakasendō
- Distance: 380.3 km from Edo
Location
- Location within Gifu Prefecture Location within Japan

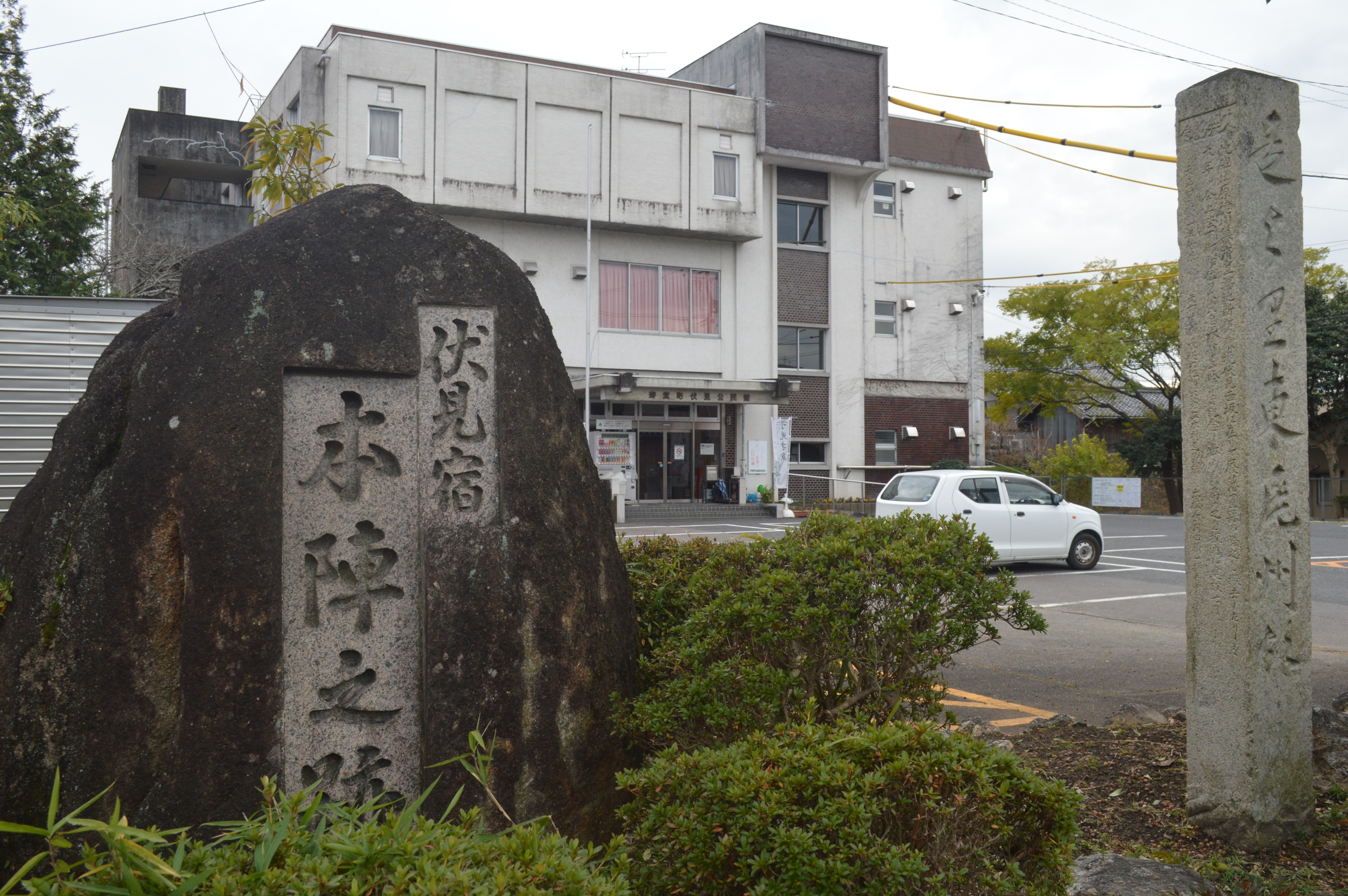
Monument marking the site of the honjin of Fushimi-juku

Fushimi-juku (伏見宿, Fushimi-juku) was the fiftieth of the sixty-nine stations of the Nakasendō connecting Edo with Kyoto in Edo period Japan. It is located in former Mino Province in what is now part of the town of Mitake, Kani District, Gifu Prefecture, Japan

== History ==
In the early Edo period, the system of post stations on the Nakasendō was formalized by the Tokugawa shogunate in 1602; however, Fushimi-juku was to established until 92 years later when changes in the flow of the Kiso River shifted the location where ferries could cross further upstream. The original settlement of Dota-juku (土田宿) was abandoned and Fushimi-juku built to replace it. It originally prospered as the place where payments of land tax in the form of rice were loaded onto barges and shipped down to the coast towards Nagoya. Fushimi was also the starting point of another side road named the Uwa-Kaidō which linked the Nakasendō and the Tōkaidō at Nagoya. However, due to its proximity to nearby post towns, such as Mitake-juku and Ōta-juku, the post station remained relatively small.

Per the 1843 "中山道宿村大概帳" (Nakasendō Shukuson Taigaichō) guidebook issued by the Inspector of Highways (道中奉行, Dōchu-būgyō), the town had a population of 485 people in 82 houses, including one honjin, one waki-honjin, and 29 hatago. Fushimi-juku was 380.3 kilometers from Edo.

Today, there is nothing remaining of Fushimi-juku except for a couple of commemorative monuments. The honjin was destroyed in a fire in 1848 and never rebuilt. Construction of modern Japan National Route 1 through the old post town meant that any old buildings surviving were demolished.

== Fushimi-juku in The Sixty-nine Stations of the Kiso Kaidō ==
Utagawa Hiroshige's ukiyo-e print of Fushimi-juku dates from 1835 -1838. The print's composition is centered on a very large cypress tree, under which a group of pilgrims are resting and taking a meal. In front are two samurai with long spears, possibly the forerunners of a daimyō procession, one of who is adjusting his sandal. To the left approaches a doctor, with a parasol, with a single sword and red furoshiki with medical supplies indicating his profession and status. To the right is a party of three blind female musicians, bearing shamisen, who appear to be making for the post station, which is show in the very far left distance.

== Neighboring Post Towns ==
Nakasendō
Mitake-juku - Fushimi-juku - Ōta-juku
Uwa Kaidō (connects the Nakasendō with Nagoya Castle)
Fushimi-juku (starting location) - Dota-juku (土田宿)
