= Kamado Station =

Railway station in Mizunami, Gifu Prefecture, Japan

CF15 Kamado Station 釜戸駅
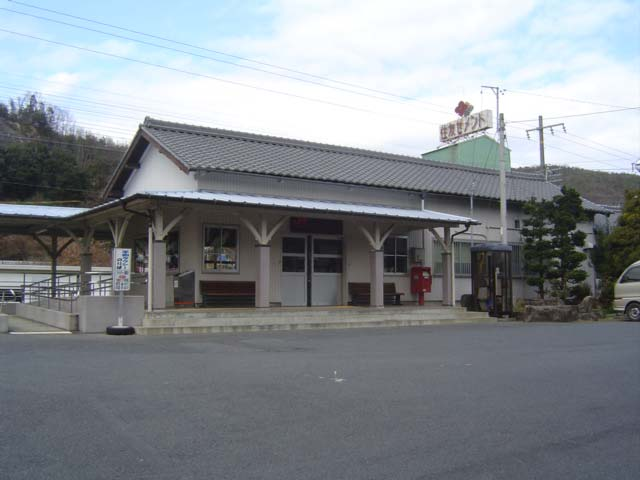
- Kamado Station in December 2004

General information
- Location: Higashi-Oshima, Mizunami-shi, Gifu-ken 509-6472; Japan
- Coordinates: 35.4112°N 137.3052°E
- Operator: JR Central
- Line: Chūō Main Line
- Distance: 339.4 km from Tokyo
- Platforms: 1 side + 1 island platform
- Tracks: 3

Other information
- Status: Staffed
- Station code: CF15

History
- Opened: 21 December 1902; 123 years ago

Passengers
- FY2016: 295 daily
Location
- Location within Gifu Prefecture Location within Japan

Kamado Station (釜戸駅, Kamado-eki) is a railway station in the city of Mizunami, Gifu Prefecture, Japan, operated by Central Japan Railway Company (JR Tōkai).

== Lines ==
Kamado Station is served by the JR Tōkai Chūō Main Line, and is located 339.4 kilometers from the official starting point of the line at Tokyo and 57.5 kilometers from Nagoya.

== Layout ==
The station has one ground-level side platform and one ground-level island platform connected by a footbridge. The station is attended.

=== Platforms ===
1, 2	■ Chūō Main Line	For Tajimi and Nagoya
3	■ Chūō Main Line	For Nakatsugawa and Nagano

== Adjacent stations ==
«	Service	»
JR Central
Chūō Main Line
Home Liner: Does not stop at this station
Takenami	Central Liner	Mizunami
Takenami	Rapid	Mizunami
Takenami	Local	Mizunami

== History ==
Kamado Station was opened on 21 December 1902. On 1 April 1987, it became part of JR Tōkai.

== Passenger statistics ==
In fiscal 2016, the station was used by an average of 295 passengers daily (boarding passengers only).

== Surrounding area ==
- Site of Ōkute-juku
- National Route 19

== See also ==
- List of railway stations in Japan
