= Mitake-juku =

Pre-modern Japan post-station along highway

Mitake-juku 御嶽宿
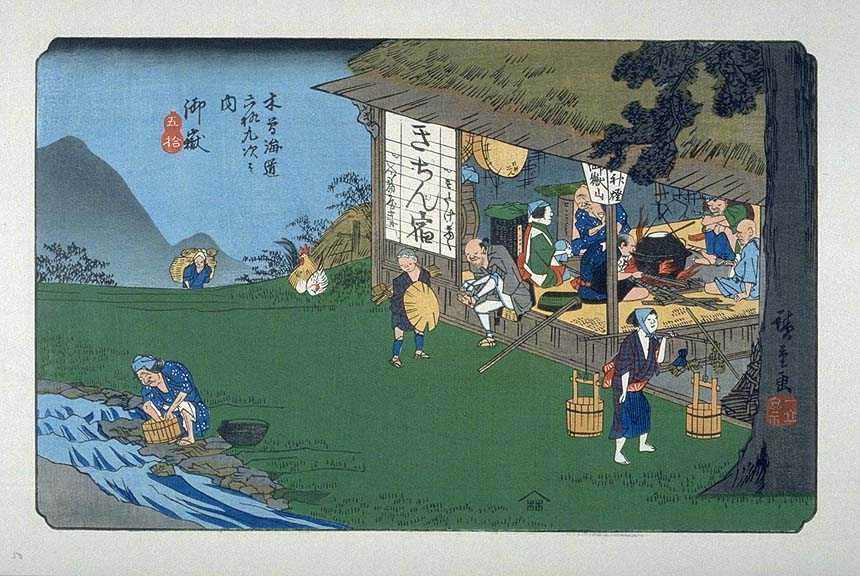
- Hiroshige's print of Mitake-juku, part of the Sixty-nine Stations of the Kiso Kaidō series

General information
- Location: Mitake, Gifu (former Mino Province); Japan
- Coordinates: 35°25′47″N 137°07′48″E
- Elevation: 129 m (423 ft)
- System: post station
- Line: Nakasendō
- Distance: 376.4 km from Edo
Location
- Location within Gifu Prefecture Location within Japan

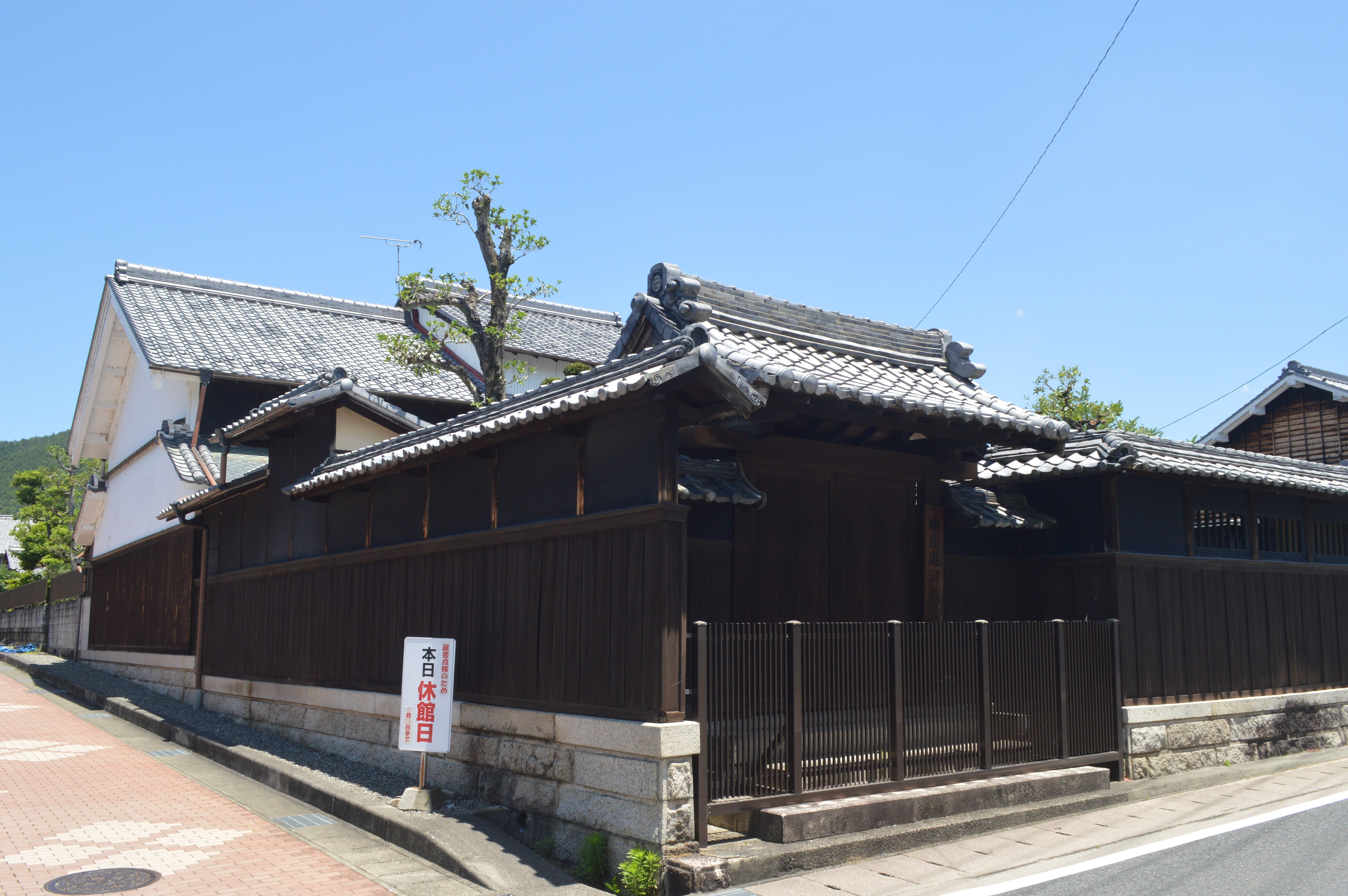
Site of the honjin

.

Mitake-juku (御嶽宿, Mitake-juku) was the forty-ninth of the sixty-nine stations of the Nakasendō connecting Edo with Kyoto in Edo period Japan. It is located in former Mino Province in what is now part of the town of Mitake, Kani District, Gifu Prefecture, Japan. Travelers often came straight to Mitake-juku to avoid the difficult paths near Hosokute-juku.

== History ==
The temple of Gankō-ji (願興寺) was founded by Saichō, the founder of Tendai Buddhism in Japan in 815 AD, and Mitake-juku grew as a temple town in front of the gates of this temple. It was thus a station on the ancient Tōsandō highway long before the creation of the Nakasendō. The area was devastated by floods in 995 AD, but the temple and settlement were spared - a fact commemorated in a festival to this date. The temple was repeatedly destroyed by natural disasters and by wars, the last of which was during fighting between Takeda Shingen and Oda Nobunaga in 1572. Many of the structures of the temple date to the late Sengoku period or early Edo period. When the system of post stations on the Nakasendō was formalized by the Tokugawa shogunate in 1602, and Mitaka-juku became a stopping place for traveling merchants and for various western daimyō on the sankin-kōtai to-and-from the Shogun's court in Edo. Sekigahara is 443 kilometers from Edo.

Per the 1843 "中山道宿村大概帳" (Nakasendō Shukuson Taigaichō) guidebook issued by the Inspector of Highways (道中奉行, Dōchu-būgyō), the town had a population of 600 people in 66 houses, including one honjin, one waki-honjin, and 28 hatago. Mitake-juku is 376.4 kilometers from Edo.

Modern Mitake-juku is fairly well-preserved. The honjin (built in 1742) and several machiya, including the Tateya hatago (built in 1877) still survives, as does the teahouse which was the subject of Hirsohige's print. Mitake-juku has a local museum, the Nakasendō Mitake-kan (中山道みたけ館) with documents and displays pertaining to the history of the post station.

== Mitake-juku in The Sixty-nine Stations of the Kiso Kaidō ==
Utagawa Hiroshige's ukiyo-e print of Mitake-juku dates from 1835 -1838. The print depicts travelers preparing to depart the station in the early morning. A notice on the front of the open-fronted teahouse proclaims "kichinyago", which was a restaurant with cheap lodgings. Inside are four travelers around a large cauldron, one of whom is talking with the mistress of the house, and on the porch is a man tying on his sandals. Outside, a woman, possibly a vendor, has two buckets suspended from a pole on her shoulder, while an old woman nearby is rubbing out a bucket by a stream. In the distance, a heavily laden man struggles up the hill, and Mount Ontake can be seen as a shadow in the far distance.

== Neighboring Post Towns ==
Nakasendō
Hosokute-juku - Mitake-juku - Fushimi-juku
