= Takenami Station =

Railway station in Ena, Gifu Prefecture, Japan

CF16 Takenami Station 武並駅
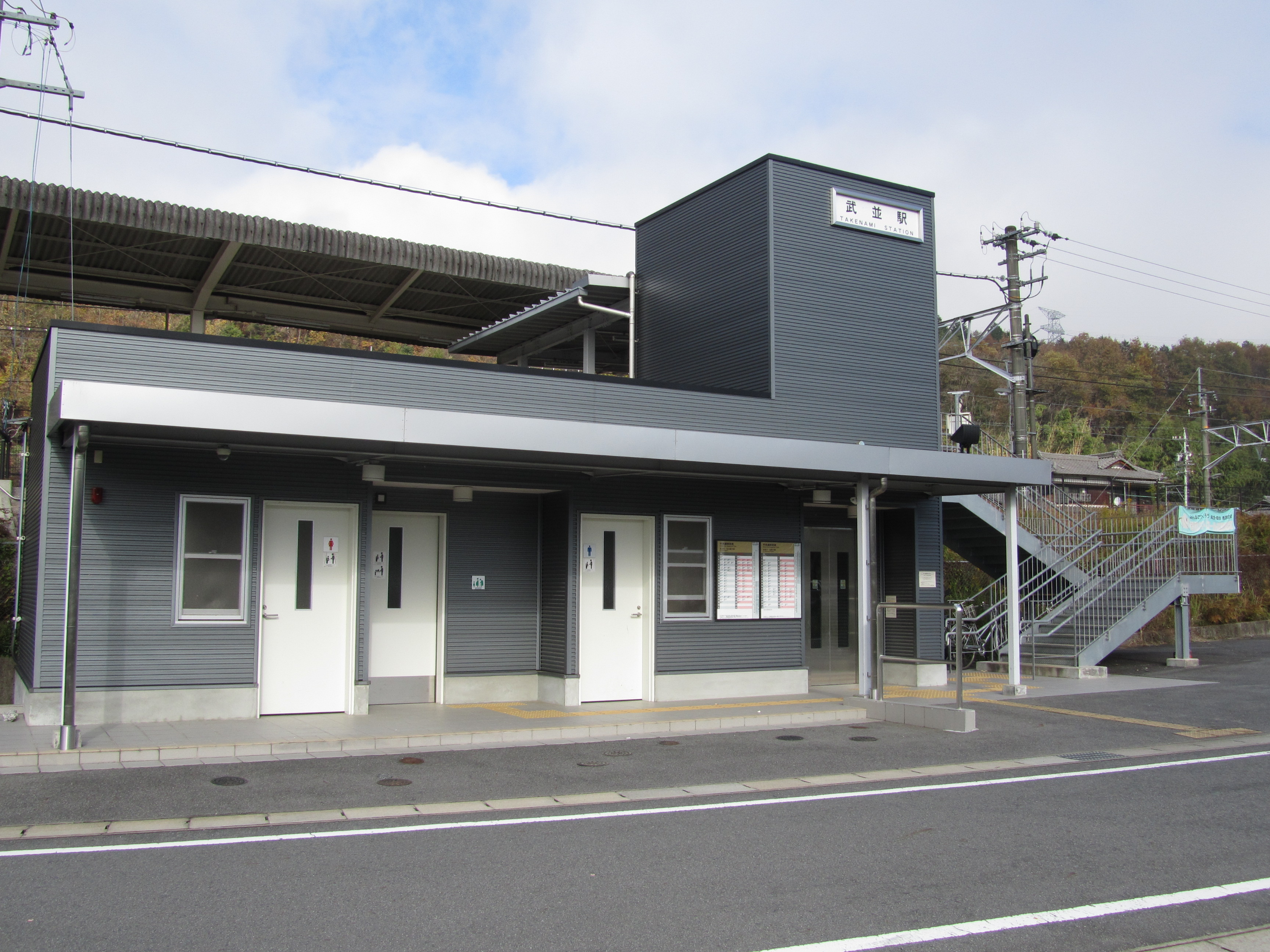
- Takenami-Station In November 2011

General information
- Location: Tokeori, Takenami-cho, Ena-shi, Gifu-ken 509-7122; Japan
- Coordinates: 35.4379°N 137.3544°E
- Operator: JR Central
- Line: Chūō Main Line
- Distance: 334.0 km from Tokyo
- Platforms: 2 side platforms
- Tracks: 2

Other information
- Status: Staffed
- Station code: CF16

History
- Opened: 1 April 1926; 100 years ago

Passengers
- FY2016: 934 daily
Location
- Location within Gifu Prefecture Location within Japan

Takenami Station (武並駅, Takenami-eki) is a railway station in the city of Ena, Gifu Prefecture, Japan, operated by Central Japan Railway Company (JR Tōkai).

== Lines ==
Takenami Station is served by the JR Tōkai Chūō Main Line, and is located 334.0 kilometers from the official starting point of the line at Tokyo and 62.9 kilometers from Nagoya.

== Layout ==
The station has two opposed ground-level side platforms connected by a footbridge. The station is staffed.

=== Platforms ===
1	■ Chūō Main Line	For Nakatsugawa and Nagano
2	■ Chūō Main Line	For Tajimi and Nagoya

== Adjacent stations ==
«	Service	»
JR Central
Chūō Main Line
Home Liner: Does not stop at this station
Ena	Central Liner	Kamado
Ena	Rapid	Kamado
Ena	Local	Kamado

== History ==
Takenami Station was opened on 25 November 1919 as the Takeori Signal Stop (竹折信号所). It elevated to a full passenger station on 1 April 1926. On 1 April 1987, it became part of JR Tōkai.

== Passenger statistics ==
In fiscal 2016, the station was used by an average of 934 passengers daily (boarding passengers only).

== Surrounding area ==
- Takenami Elementary School
- National Route 19

== See also ==
- List of railway stations in Japan
