= Kamagatani =

Valley in Gifu Prefecture, Japan

- 霞間ヶ渓
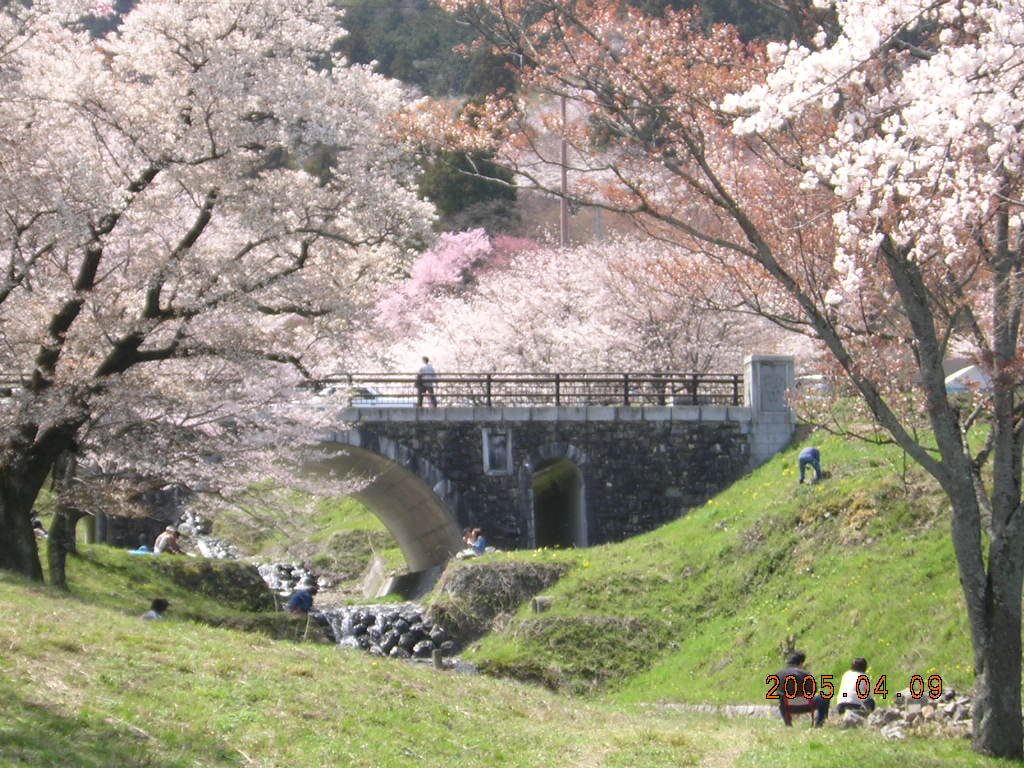
- Kamagatani

- Location within Gifu Prefecture Location within Japan
- Type: Urban park
- Location: Ikeda, Gifu, Japan
- Coordinates: 35°25′55″N 136°32′57″E
- National Palace of Scenic Beauty Natural Monument

Kamagatani (霞間ヶ渓) is a valley in the town of Ikeda, Gifu Prefecture, Japan noted for a scenic valley. It is a noted spot for viewing cherry blossoms in spring and was designated both a nationally designated Place of Scenic Beauty and Natural Monument, in 1928 It is located within the borders of the Ibi-Sekigahara-Yōrō Quasi-National Park.

== Overview ==
The Kamagatani valley was formed by erosion of the eastern slope of Mount Ikeda, and the topography is very steep. It was famed for its cherry blossoms since ancient times, and many varieties of flowering cherry trees grew naturally in this area. During the Edo period, the various daimyō of Ogaki Domain planted more cherry trees, (especially the Somei Yoshino variety) to help prevent landslides. As the area became a tourist destination after the Meiji restoration, planting and replanting has continued, and there are now an estimated 2000 cherry trees along a two kilometer length of the valley. The park is one of the leading hanami locations in the Tōkai region, and has been selected as one of the "100 Best Cherry Blossom Spots in Japan" by the Japan Sakura Association

In addition, the area is also a special production area for tea, and tea fields spread out between the rows of cherry blossom trees.

== See also ==
- List of Places of Scenic Beauty of Japan (Gifu)
