= Mizunami Station =

Railway station in Mizunami, Gifu Prefecture, Japan

CF14 Mizunami Station 瑞浪駅
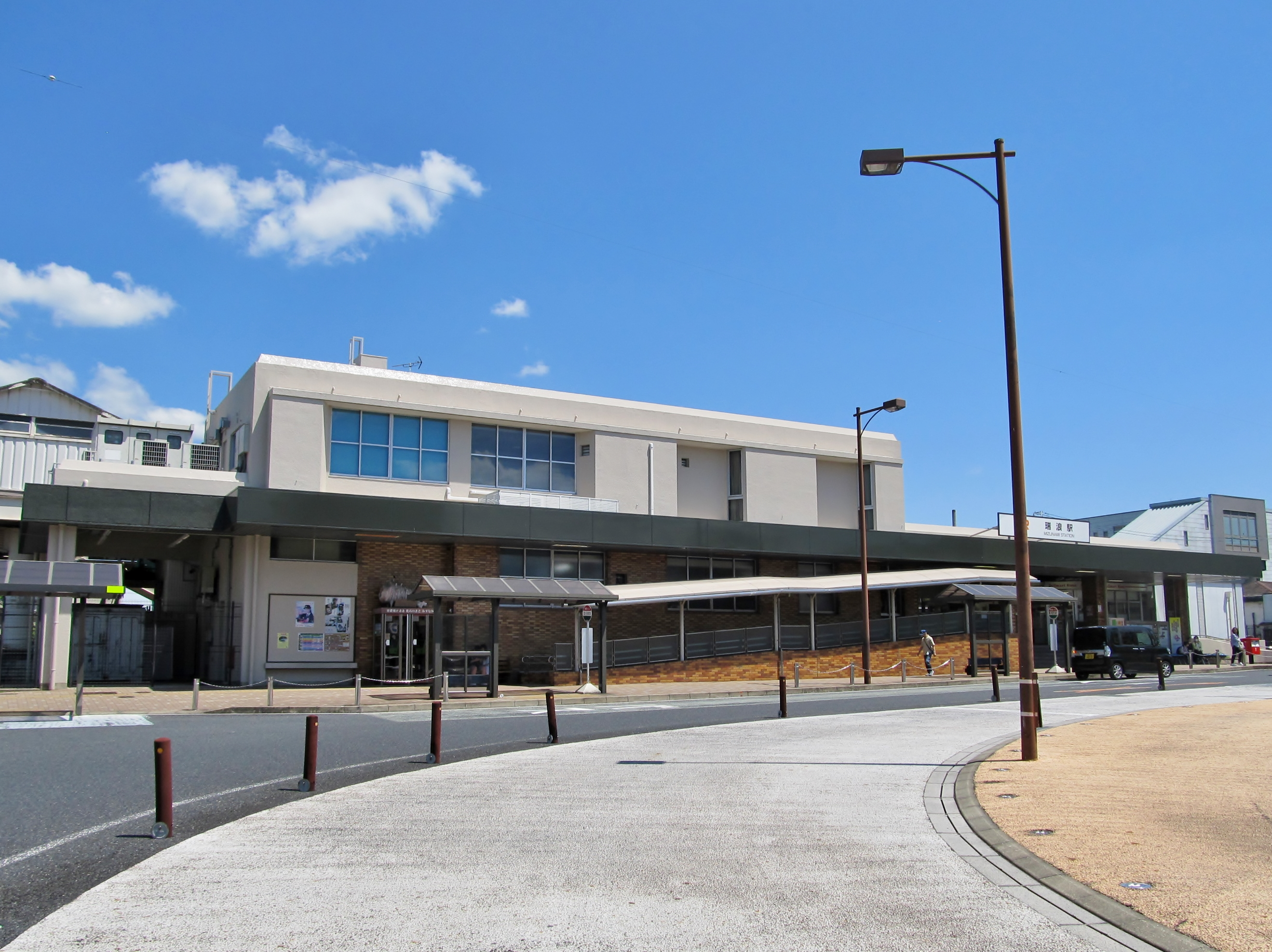
- Mizunami Station in May 2024

General information
- Location: 1171-2 Terakawado-cho, Mizunami-shi, Gifu-ken 509-6121; Japan
- Coordinates: 35.3698°N 137.2529°E
- Operator: JR Central
- Line: Chūō Main Line
- Distance: 346.8 km from Tokyo
- Platforms: 1 side + 1 island platform
- Tracks: 3

Other information
- Status: Staffed Midori no Madoguchi)
- Station code: CF14
- Website: Official website

History
- Opened: 21 December 1902; 123 years ago

Passengers
- FY2016: 4793 daily
Location
- Location within Gifu Prefecture Location within Japan

Mizunami Station (瑞浪駅, Mizunami-eki) is a railway station in the city of Mizunami, Gifu Prefecture, Japan, operated by Central Japan Railway Company (JR Tōkai).

== Lines ==
Mizunami Station is served by the JR Tōkai Chūō Main Line, and is located 346.8 kilometers from the official starting point of the line at Tokyo and 50.1 kilometers from Nagoya.

== Layout ==
The station has one ground-level side platform and one ground-level island platform connected by a footbridge. The station has a Midori no Madoguchi staffed ticket office.

=== Platforms ===
1	■ Chūō Main Line	For Tajimi and Nagoya
2, 3	■ Chūō Main Line	For Nakatsugawa and Nagano

== Adjacent stations ==
«	Service	»
JR Central
Chūō Main Line
Ena	Home Liner	Tokishi
Kamado	Central Liner	Tokishi
Kamado	Rapid	Tokishi
Kamado	Local	Tokishi

== History ==
Mizunami Station was opened on 21 December 1902. On 1 April 1987, it became part of JR Tōkai.

== Passenger statistics ==
In fiscal 2016, the station was used by an average of 4793 passengers daily (boarding passengers only).

== Surrounding area ==
- Mizunami City Hall

== See also ==
- List of railway stations in Japan
