= Kaneyama, Gifu =

Kaneyama 兼山町 かねやまちょう
- Town
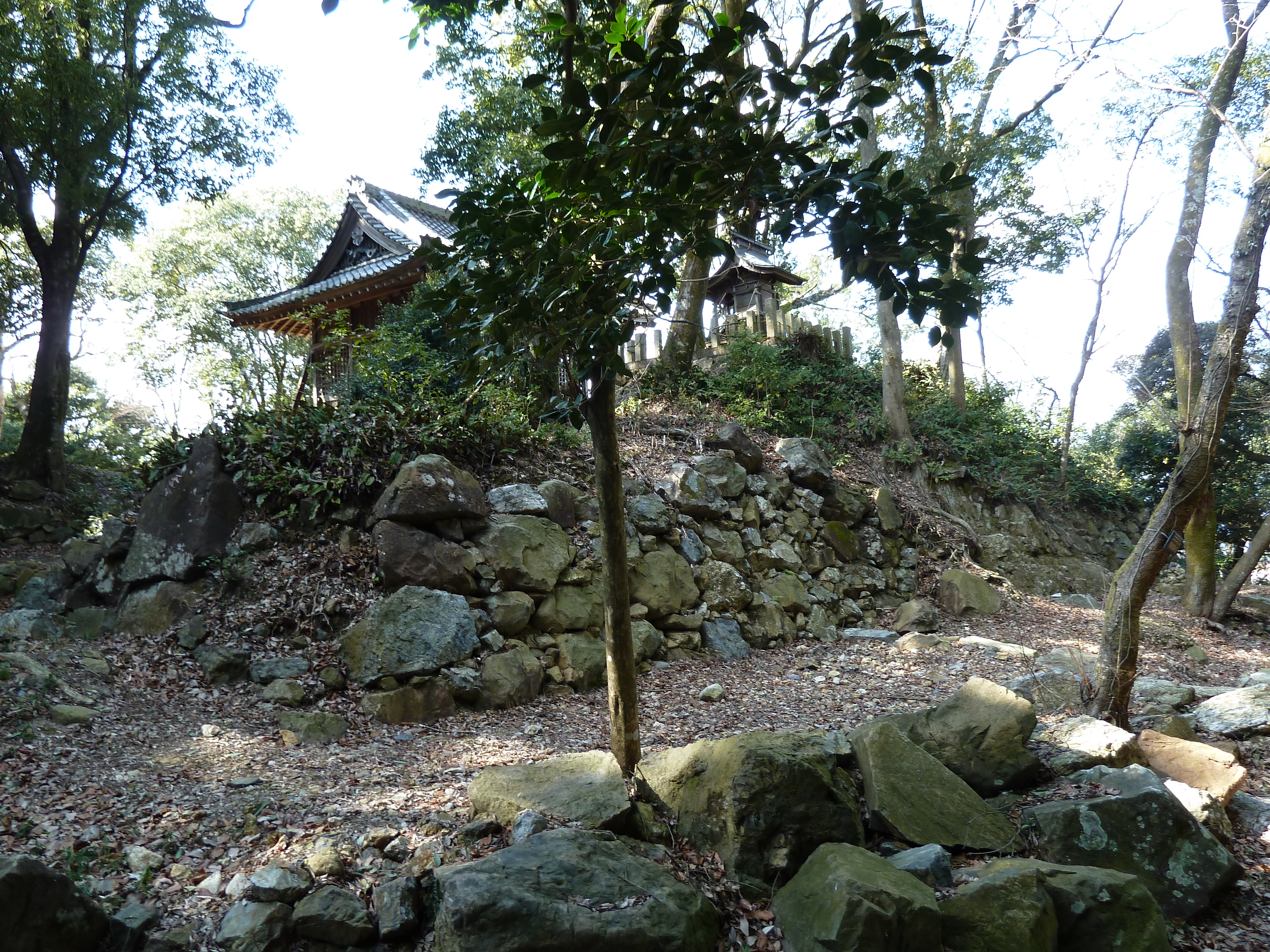
- Kaneyama Castle ruins

- Flag Seal
- Interactive map of Kaneyama
- Country: Japan
- Region: Chūbu (Tōkai)
- Prefecture: Gifu
- District: Kani
- Merged: May 1, 2005

Area
  - Total: 2.61 km^{2} (1.01 sq mi)

Population
  - Estimate (2005): 1,638

Map of Kaneyama, Gifu

Kaneyama (兼山町, Kaneyama-chō) was a town located in Kani District, Gifu Prefecture, Japan.

As of 2003, the town had an estimated population of 1,695 and a density of 649.43 persons per km^{2}. The total area was 2.61 km^{2} (which was the smallest municipality of the country in terms of area before the merger took place).

On May 1, 2005, Kaneyama was merged into the expanded city of Kani.
