= Hosokute-juku =

Pre-modern Japan post-station along highway

Hosokute-juku 細久手宿
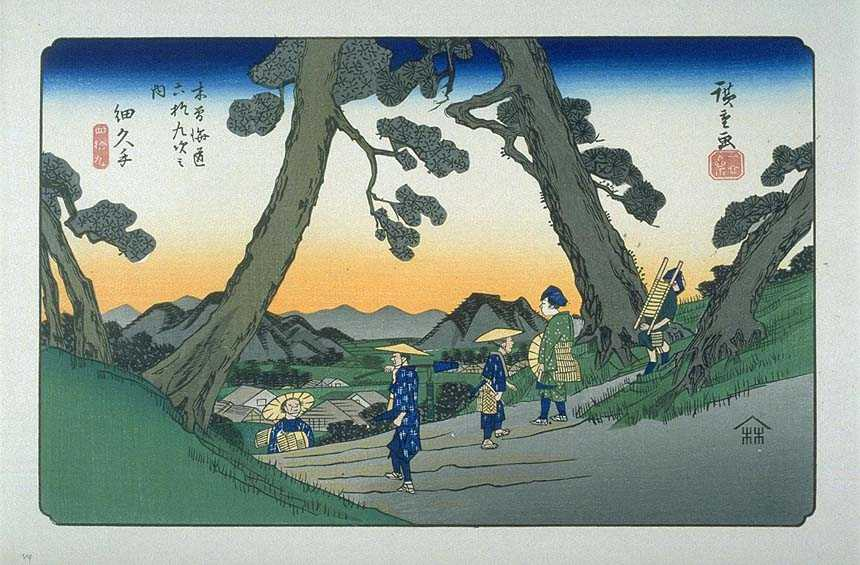
- Hiroshige's print of Hosokute-juku, part of the Sixty-nine Stations of the Kiso Kaidō series

General information
- Location: Mizunami, Gifu (former Mino Province); Japan
- Coordinates: 35°25′53.1″N 137°14′02.3″E
- Elevation: 426 m (1,398 ft)
- System: post station
- Line: Nakasendō
- Distance: 364.6 km from Edo
Location
- Location within Gifu Prefecture Location within Japan

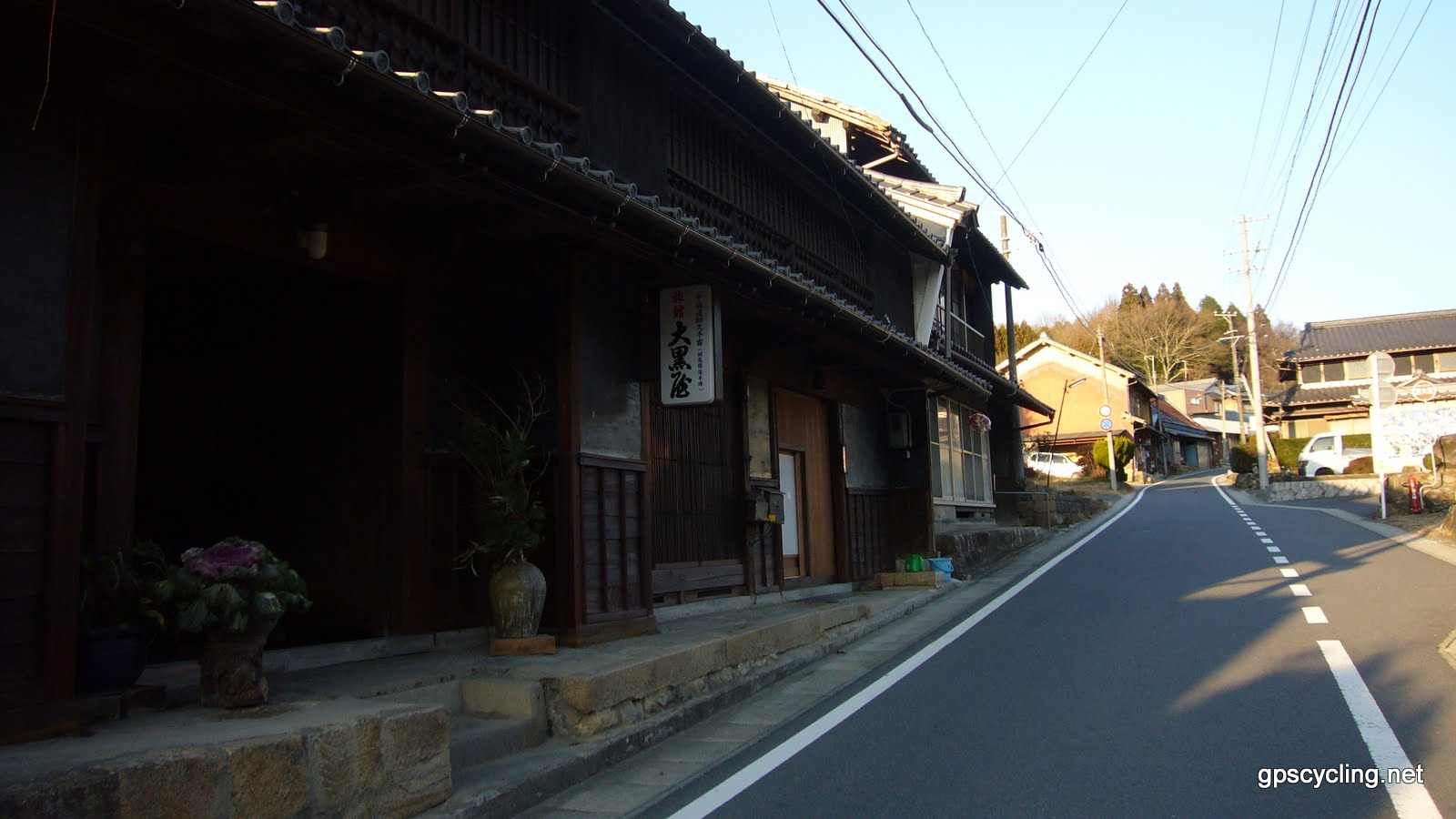
Hosokute-juku, 2008

Hosokute-juku (細久手宿, Hosokute-juku) was the forty-eighth of the sixty-nine stations of the Nakasendō connecting Edo with Kyoto in Edo period Japan. It is located in former Mino Province in what is now part of the city of Mizunami, Gifu Prefecture, Japan.

== History ==
In the early Edo period, the system of post stations on the Nakasendō was formalized by the Tokugawa shogunate in 1602. The route between Ōkute-juku and Mitake-juku was long and the terrain was difficult, crossing the Biwa-toge Pass, so another post station was established as a resting spot in-between in 1610. This was Hosokute-juku, and it is located within the territory of Owari Domain. The temple of Kaigen-in, the bodaiji of the Toki clan, the shugo of Mino Province in the Muromachi period is located nearby,

Per the 1843 "中山道宿村大概帳" (Nakasendō Shukuson Taigaichō) guidebook issued by the Inspector of Highways (道中奉行, Dōchu-būgyō), the town had a population of 256 people in 65 houses, including one honjin, one waki-honjin, and 24 hatago. Hosokute-juku was 364.6 kilometers to Edo.

The route of the modern highway bypassed Hosokute-juku, so several old buildings of the post station have been preserved, including the honjin, Daikokuya, which is still open as an inn

== Hosokute-juku in The Sixty-nine Stations of the Kiso Kaidō ==
Utagawa Hiroshige's ukiyo-e print of Hosokute-juku dates from 1835 -1838. The print depicts travelers climbing or descending a steep slope, with paddy fields and a range of mountains in the distance. In front is samurai with a bamboo water canteen suspended from his sword. Following is a woman in green kimono with a powdered white face. Going up the slope are a farmer with a backpack followed by his wife with a sickle. To the left, with only the upper half of his torso in view is a man with two bags, and the post station in the distance.

== Neighboring Post Towns ==
Nakasendō
Ōkute-juku - Hosokute-juku - Mitake-juku
