= Ōkute-juku =

Pre-modern Japan post-station along highway

Ōkute-juku 大湫宿
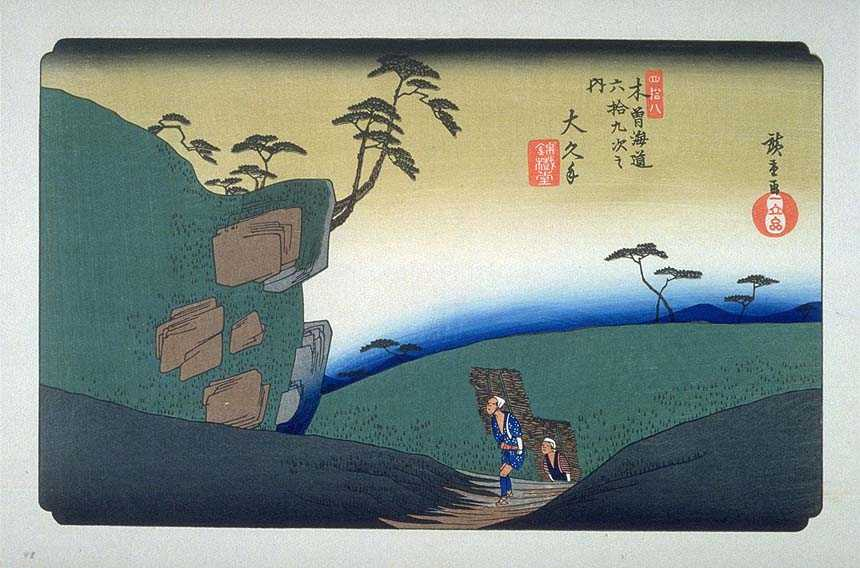
- Hiroshige's print of Ōkute-juku, part of the Sixty-nine Stations of the Kiso Kaidō series

General information
- Location: Mizunami, Gifu (former Mino Province); Japan
- Coordinates: 35°26′01.9″N 137°17′42.3″E
- Elevation: 512 m (1,680 ft)
- System: post station
- Line: Nakasendō
- Distance: 358.7 km from Edo
Location
- Location within Gifu Prefecture Location within Japan

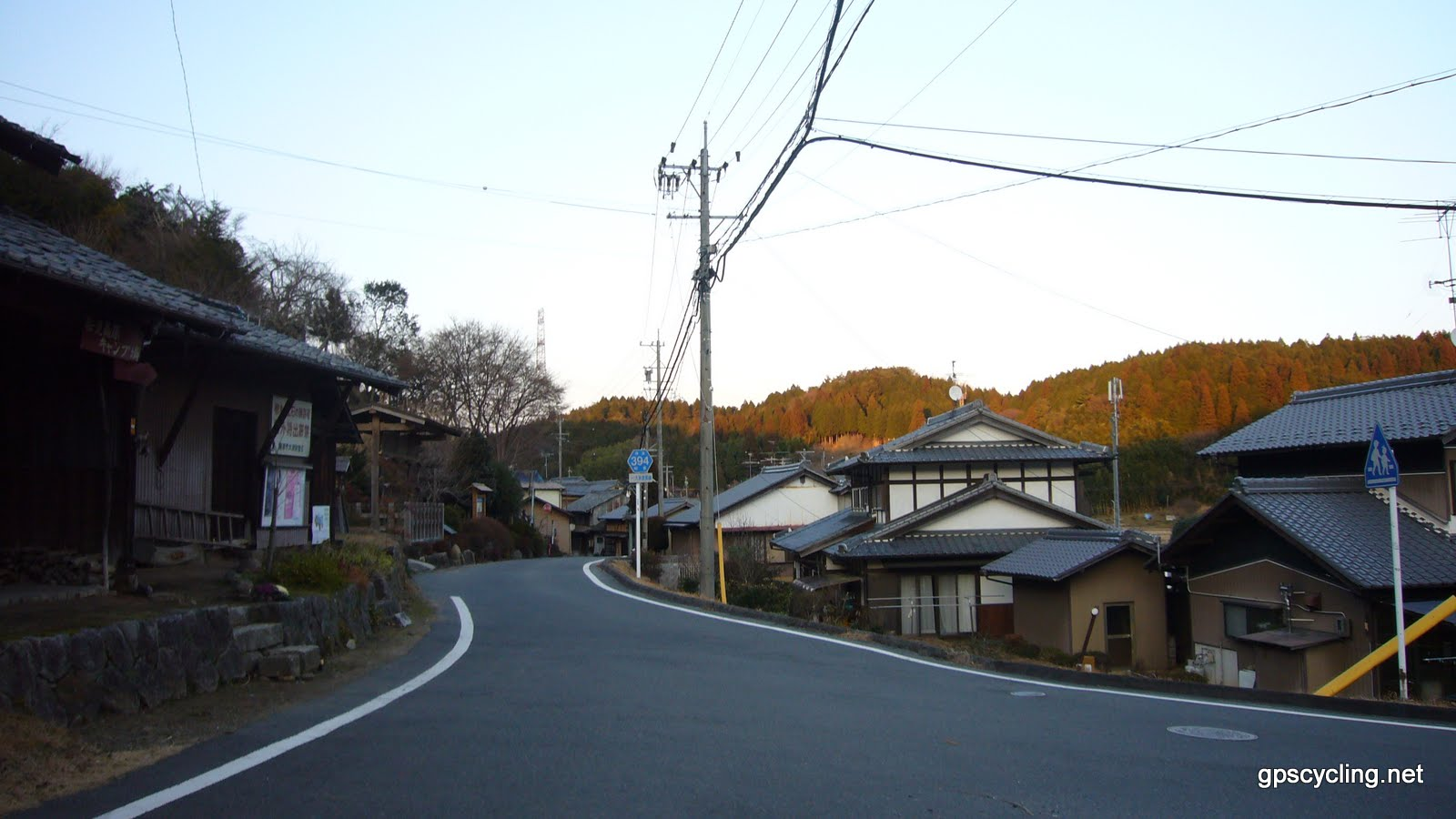
Modern Ōkute-juku

Ōkute-juku (大湫宿, Ōkute-juku) was the forty-seventh of the sixty-nine stations of the Nakasendō connecting Edo with Kyoto in Edo period Japan. It is located in former Mino Province in what is now part of the city of Mizunami, Gifu Prefecture, Japan. Alternative kanji for the post town are 大久手.

== History ==
Ōkute was a settlement on the ancient Tōsandō highway from the Nara period, which preceded the construction of the Nakasendō. Between Ōi and Ōkute, the road was very narrow and mountainous and goes through 13 passes (Jusan-toge), with irregular stone steps in places. In the early Edo period, the system of post stations on the Nakasendō was formalized by the Tokugawa shogunate in 1602, and Ōkute-juku was constructed in 1604, became a stopping place for traveling merchants and was also on the sankin-kōtai route used by various western daimyō to-and-from the Shogun's court in Edo. The station itself was located with the territory of Owari Domain. The station is located at the foot of the Biwa Pass (琵琶峠, Biwa-tōge), which has a monument with a poem by Princess Kazu-no-miya, who stayed overnight at Ōkute-juku en-route to her marriage to Shogun Tokugawa Iemochi in Edo.

Per the 1843 "中山道宿村大概帳" (Nakasendō Shukuson Taigaichō) guidebook issued by the Inspector of Highways (道中奉行, Dōchu-būgyō), the town had a population of 338 people in 66 houses, including one honjin, one waki-honjin, and 30 hatago. At an elevation of 512 meters above sea level, Ōkute-juku is the highest station in the Mino section of the highway. It is 358.7 kilometers from Edo.

Today, only remains of the station are part of the waki-honjin, the kosatsuba or official notice board and a few machiya. The honjin was on the hill above the city, but it has been destroyed and a school has been built at its former location.

== Ōkute-juku in The Sixty-nine Stations of the Kiso Kaidō ==
Utagawa Hiroshige's ukiyo-e print of Ōkute-juku dates from 1835 -1838. The print is a bizarre composition showing surrealistically shaped boulders which make the work an almost abstract landscape. Two woodcutters with tall stacks of firewood on their backs are depicted climbing a steep slope and gazing at a hillside with blocks of exposed rock and weirdly-shaped pine trees and featureless hills. There is no sign of the post station.

== Neighboring post towns ==
Nakasendō
Ōi-juku - Ōkute-juku - Hosokute-juku
