= Gokokushi-ji =

Buddhist temple in Gifu Prefecture, Japan

Coordinates: 35°26′46.88″N 136°47′43.97″E

Gokokushi-ji 護国之寺
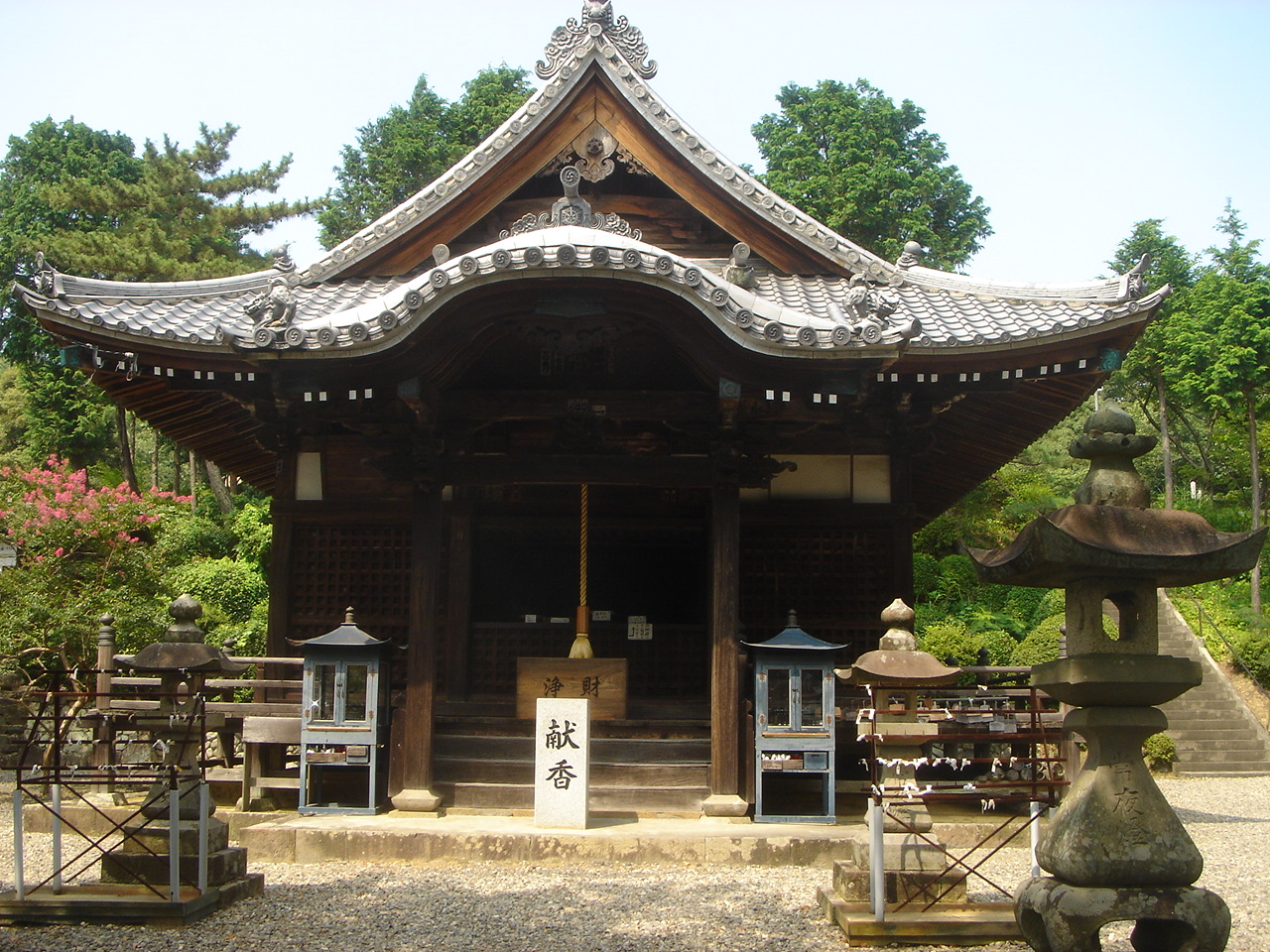
- Gokokushi-ji's main hall

Religion
- Affiliation: Shingon

Location
- Location: 194-1 Nagara Obusa; Gifu, Gifu Prefecture
- Country: Japan
- Interactive map of Gokokushi-ji 護国之寺

Architecture
- Completed: 746

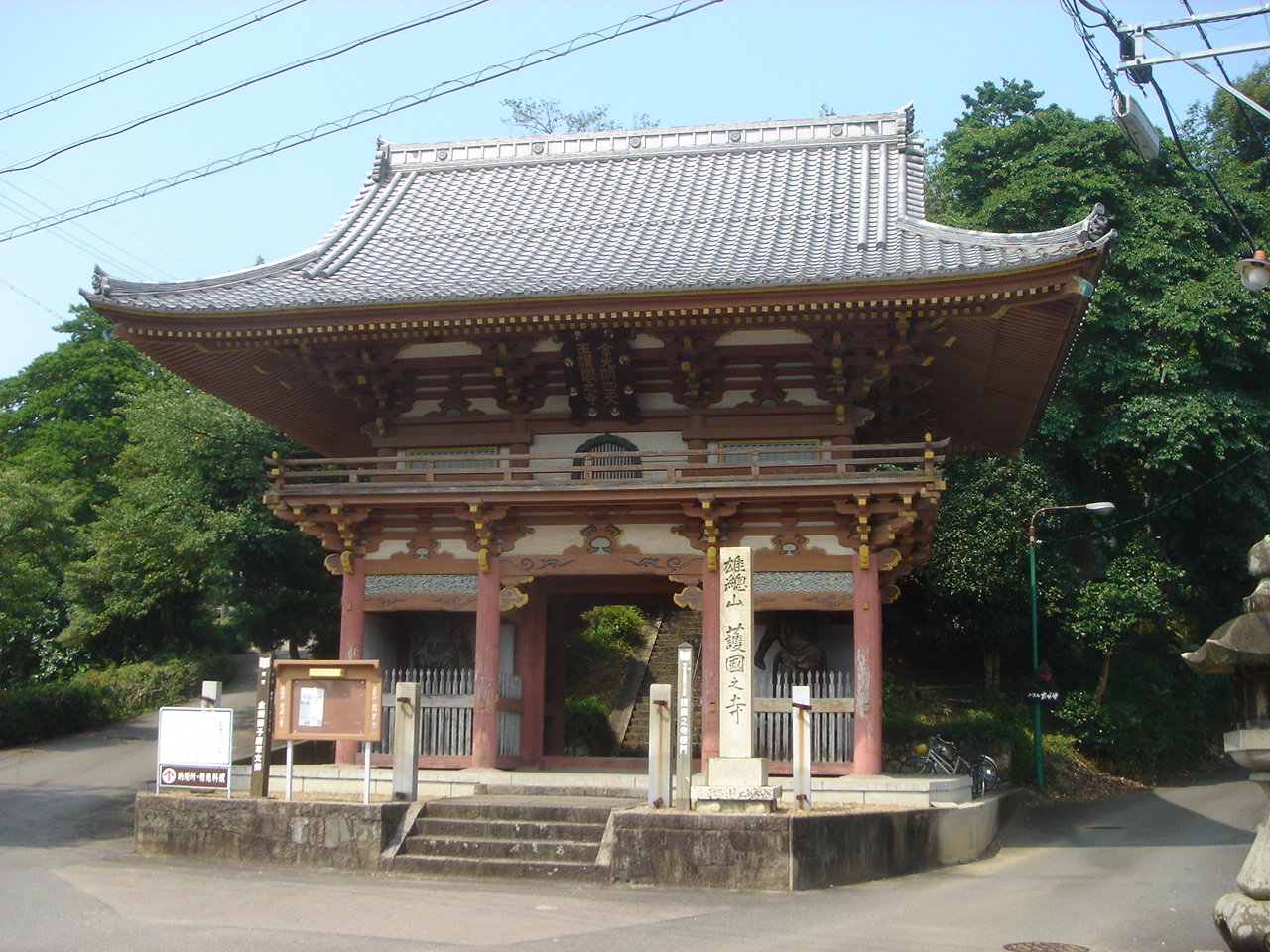
Rō-mon (楼門)

Gokokushi-ji (護国之寺) is a Buddhist temple of the Shingon sect located in Gifu, Gifu Prefecture, Japan. It is the seventeenth of the Mino Thirty-three Kannon.

== History ==
The Temple was founded in 746, under the orders of Emperor Shōmu. The original temple was destroyed in 1590 by a large fire, but was rebuilt during the Edo period's Genbun and Hōreki eras. The rebuilt temple is still extant today.

== See also ==
- List of National Treasures of Japan (crafts-others)

== Images ==
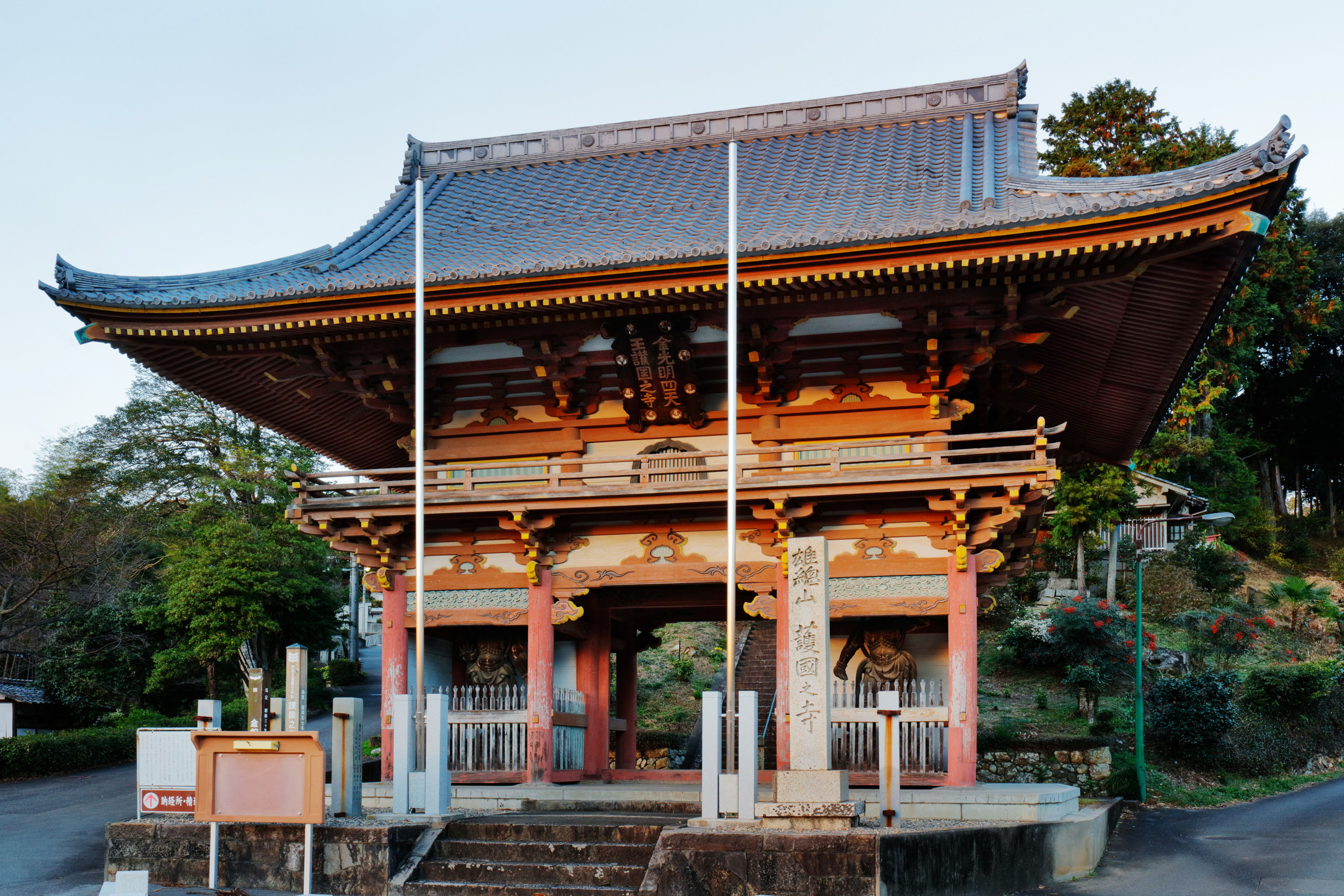
桜

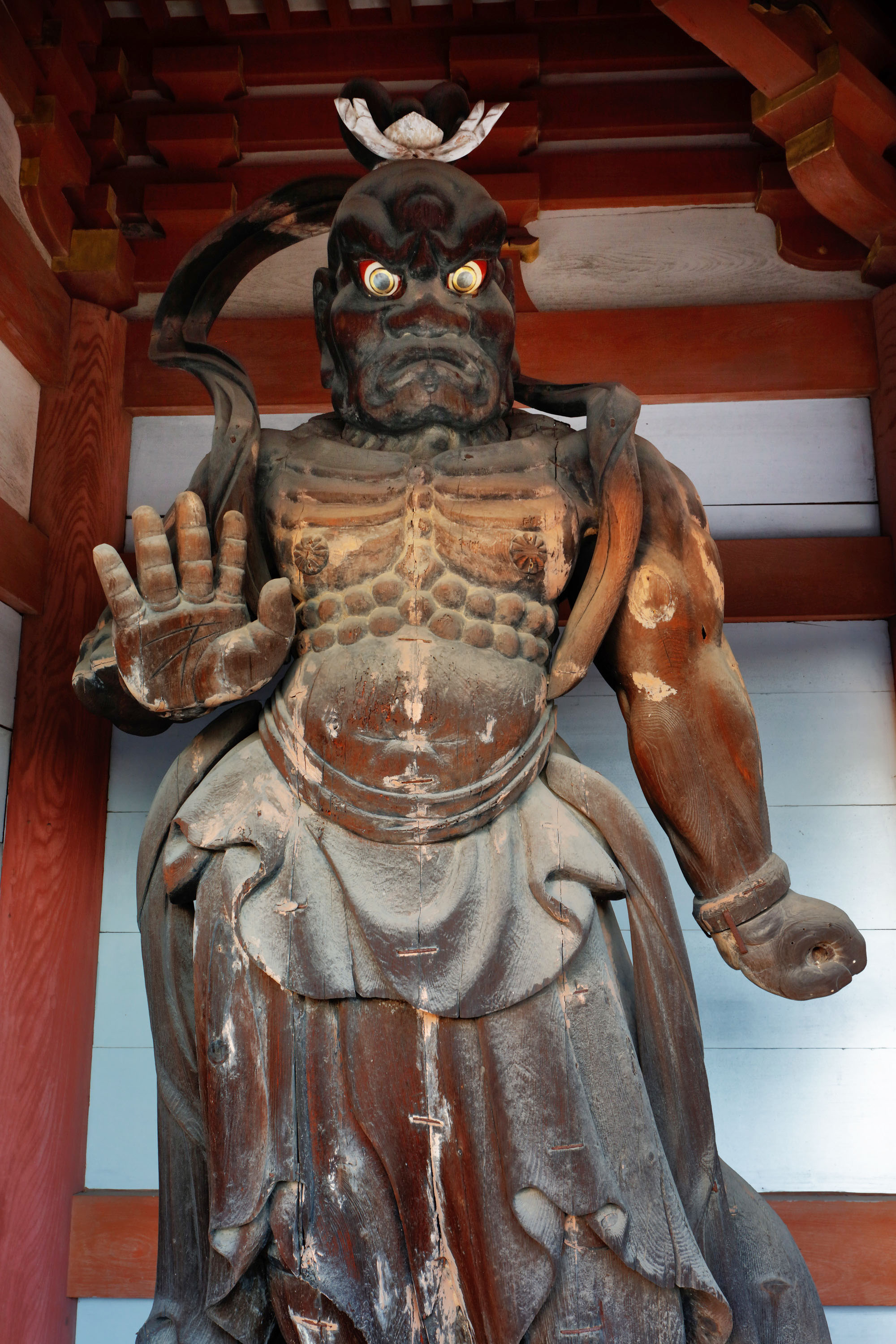

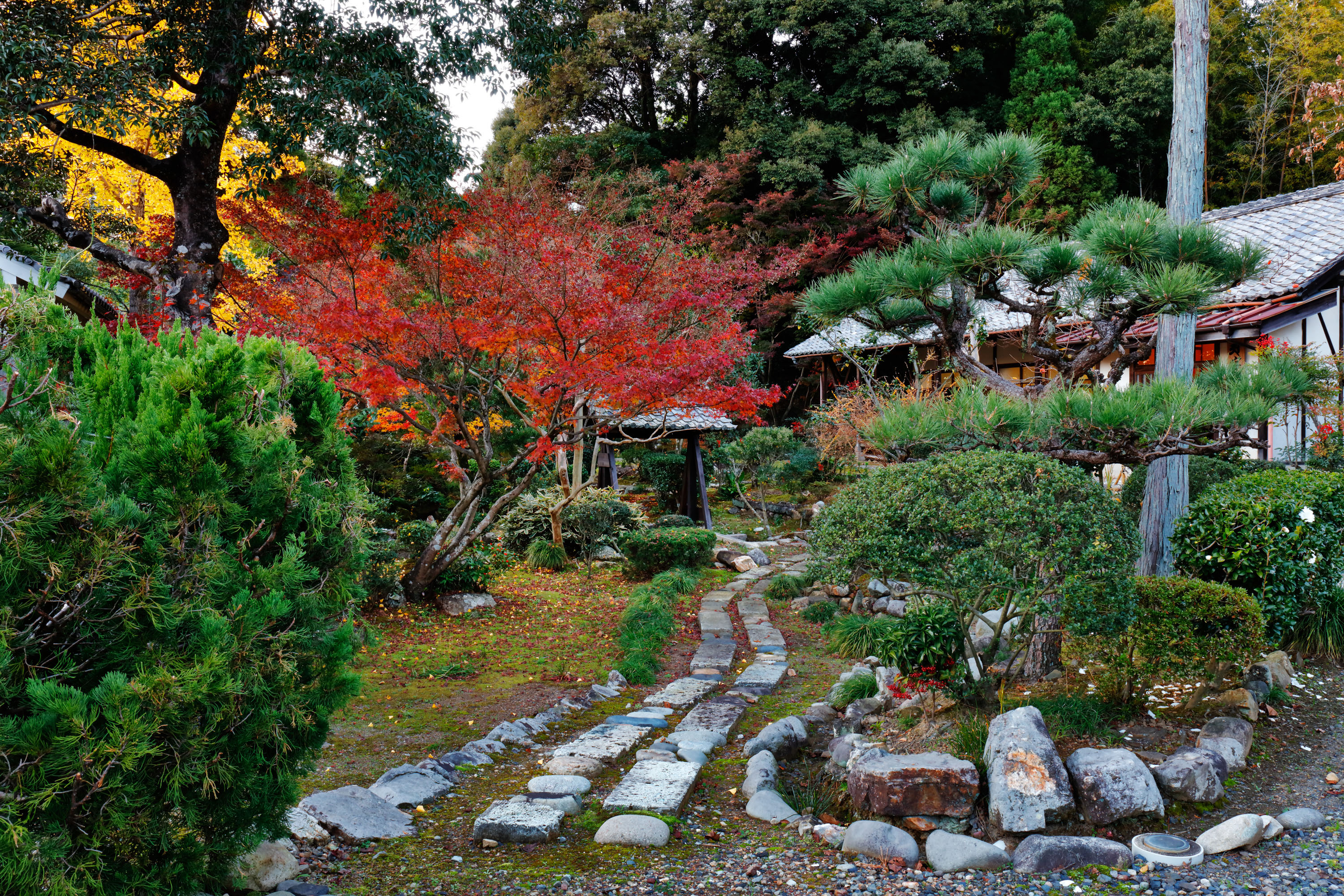

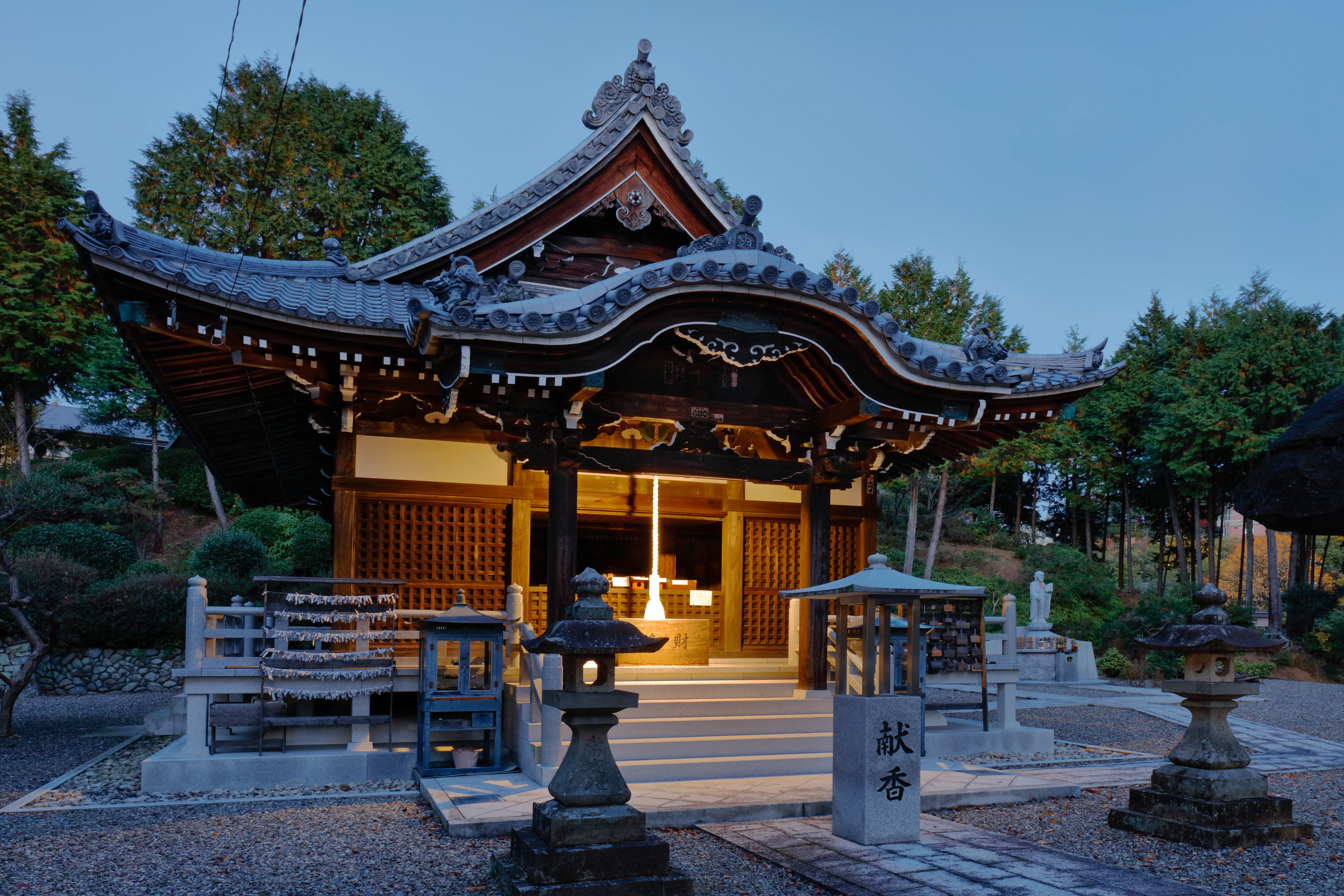

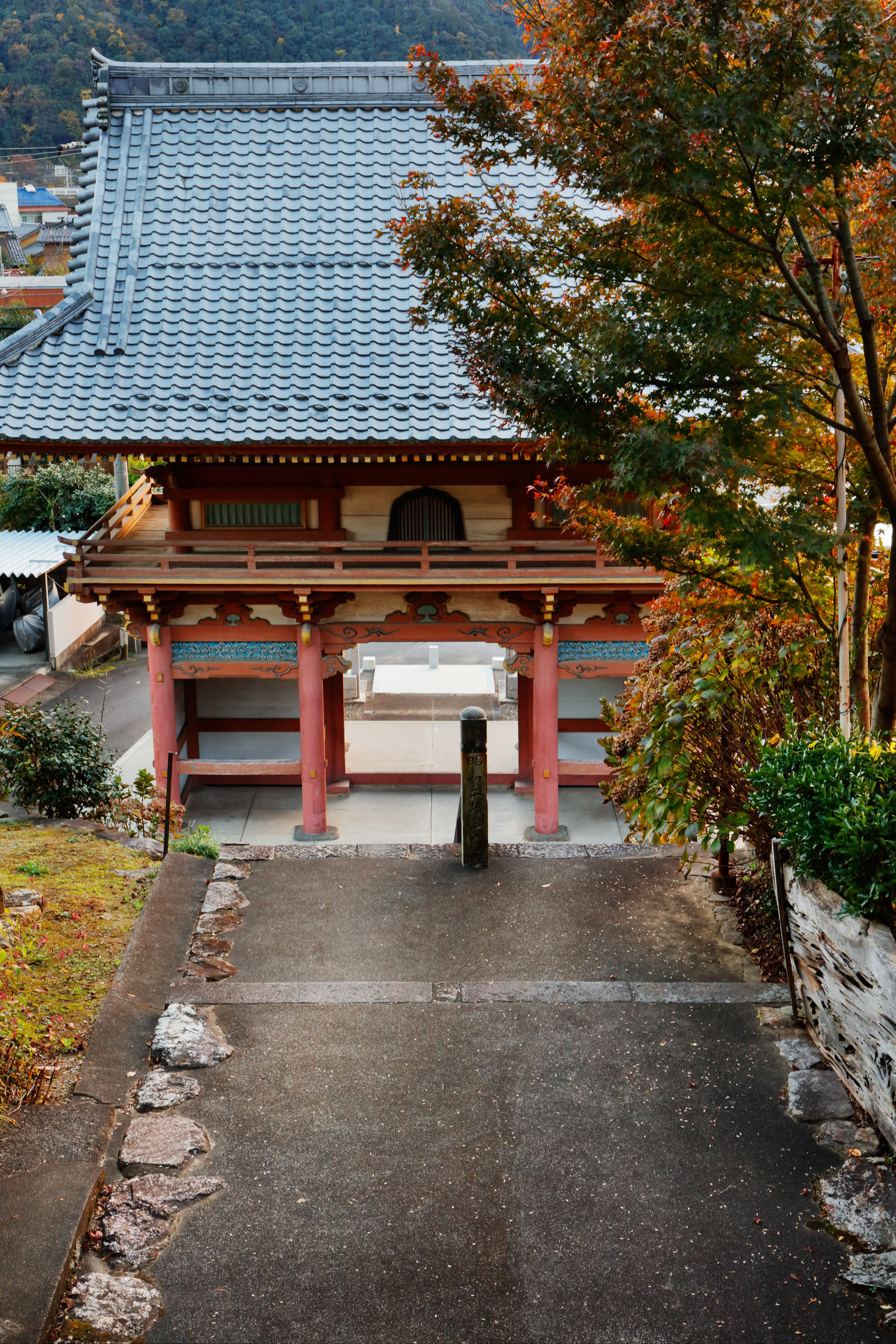

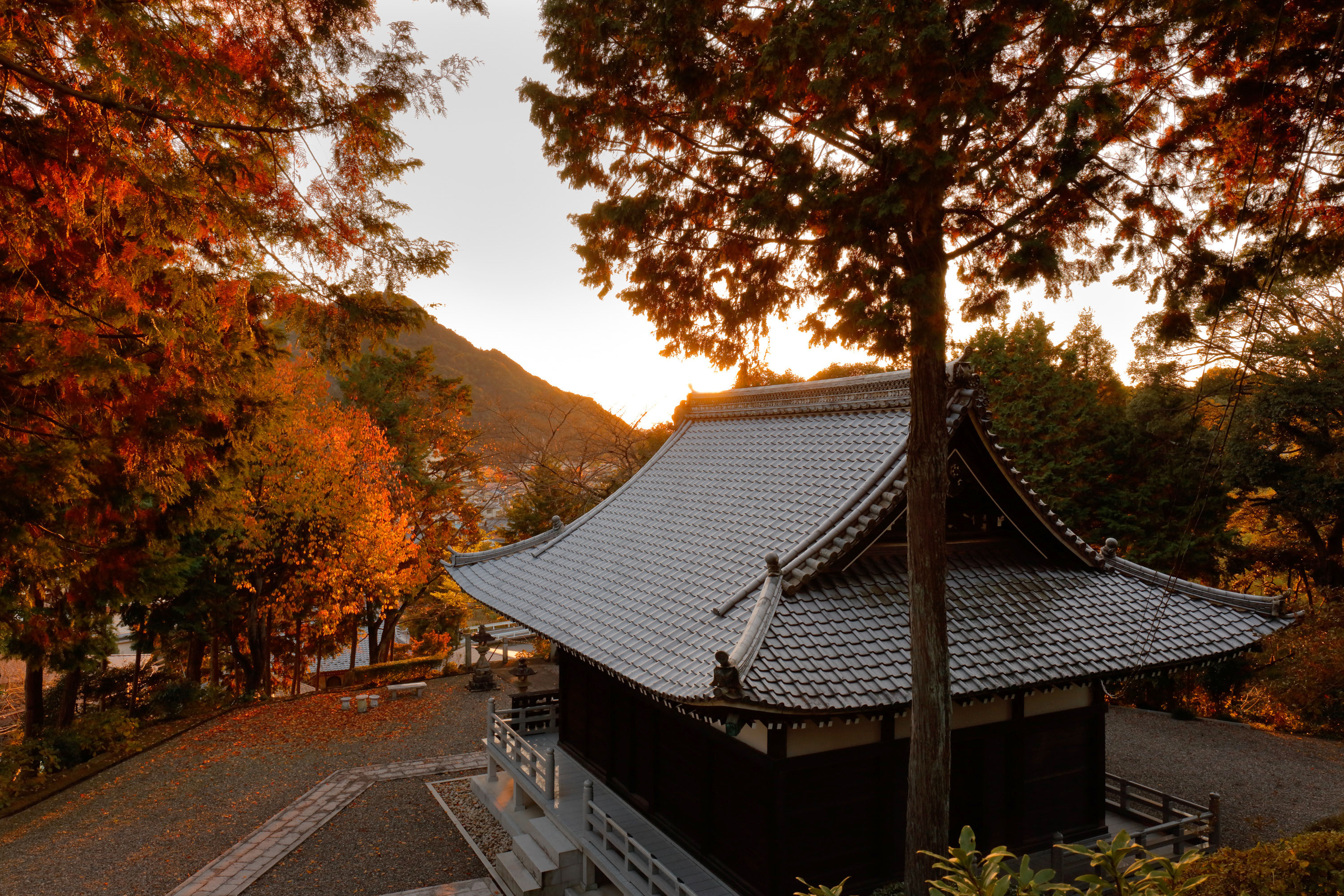

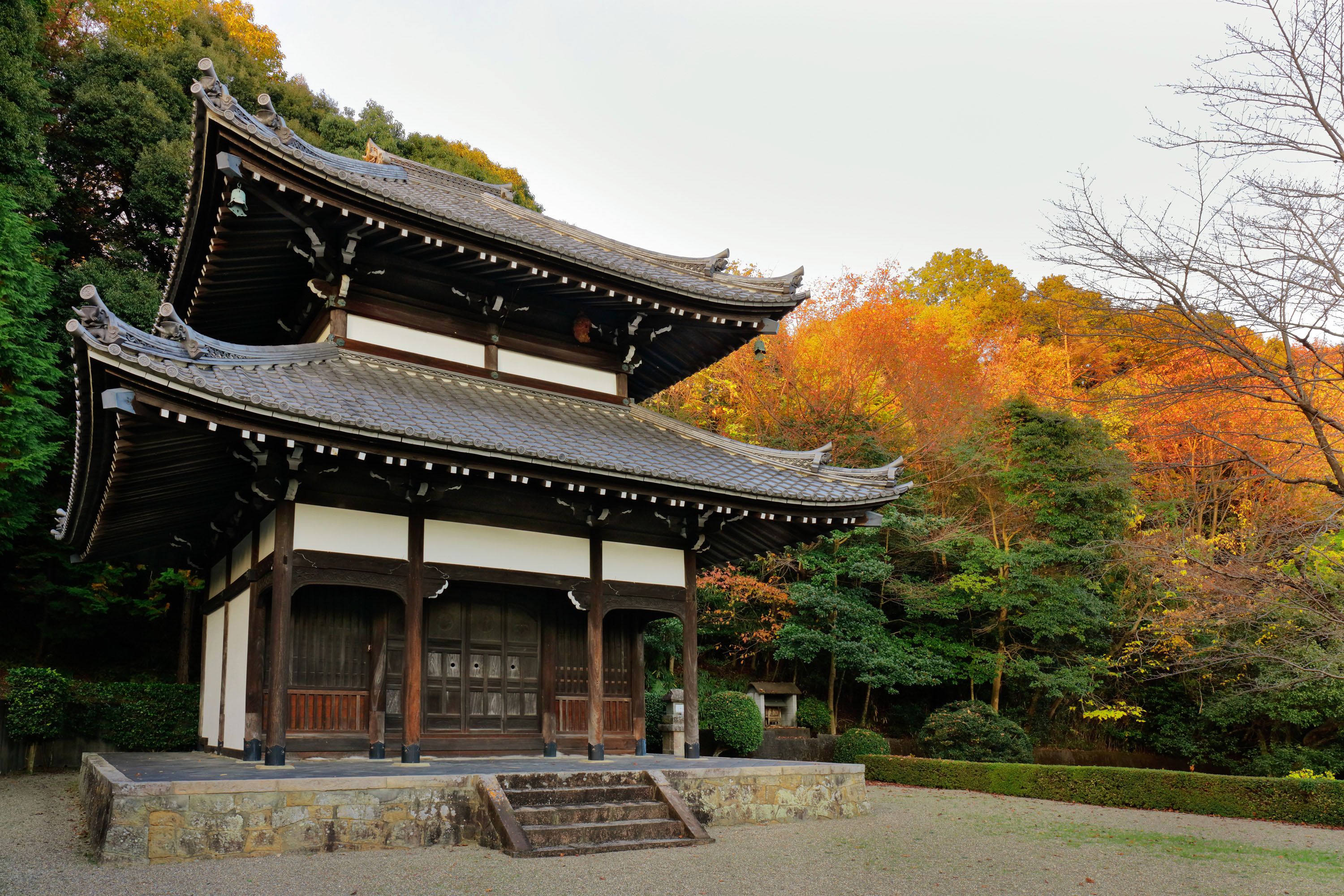

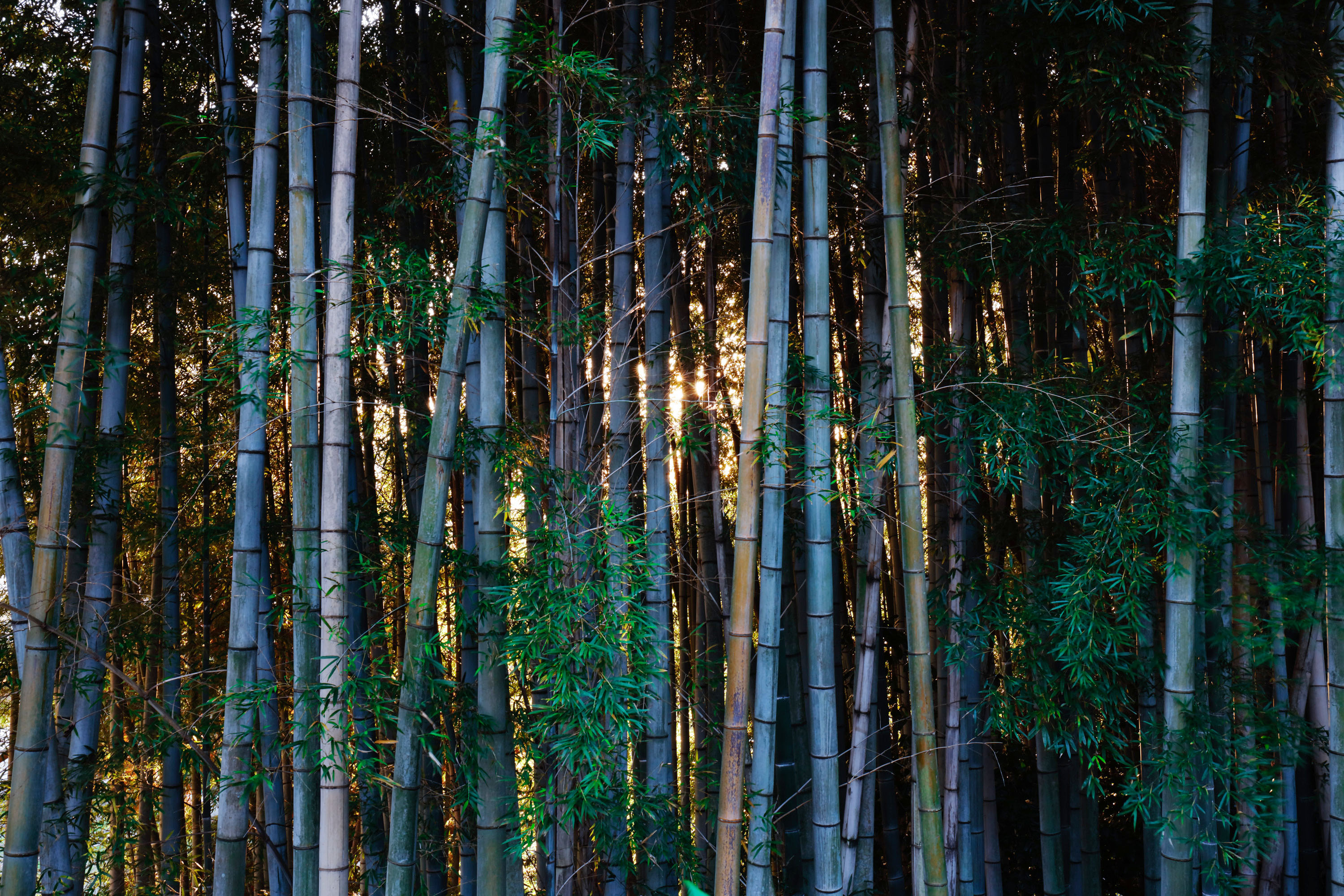
