= Mizunami =

Mizunami 瑞浪市
- City
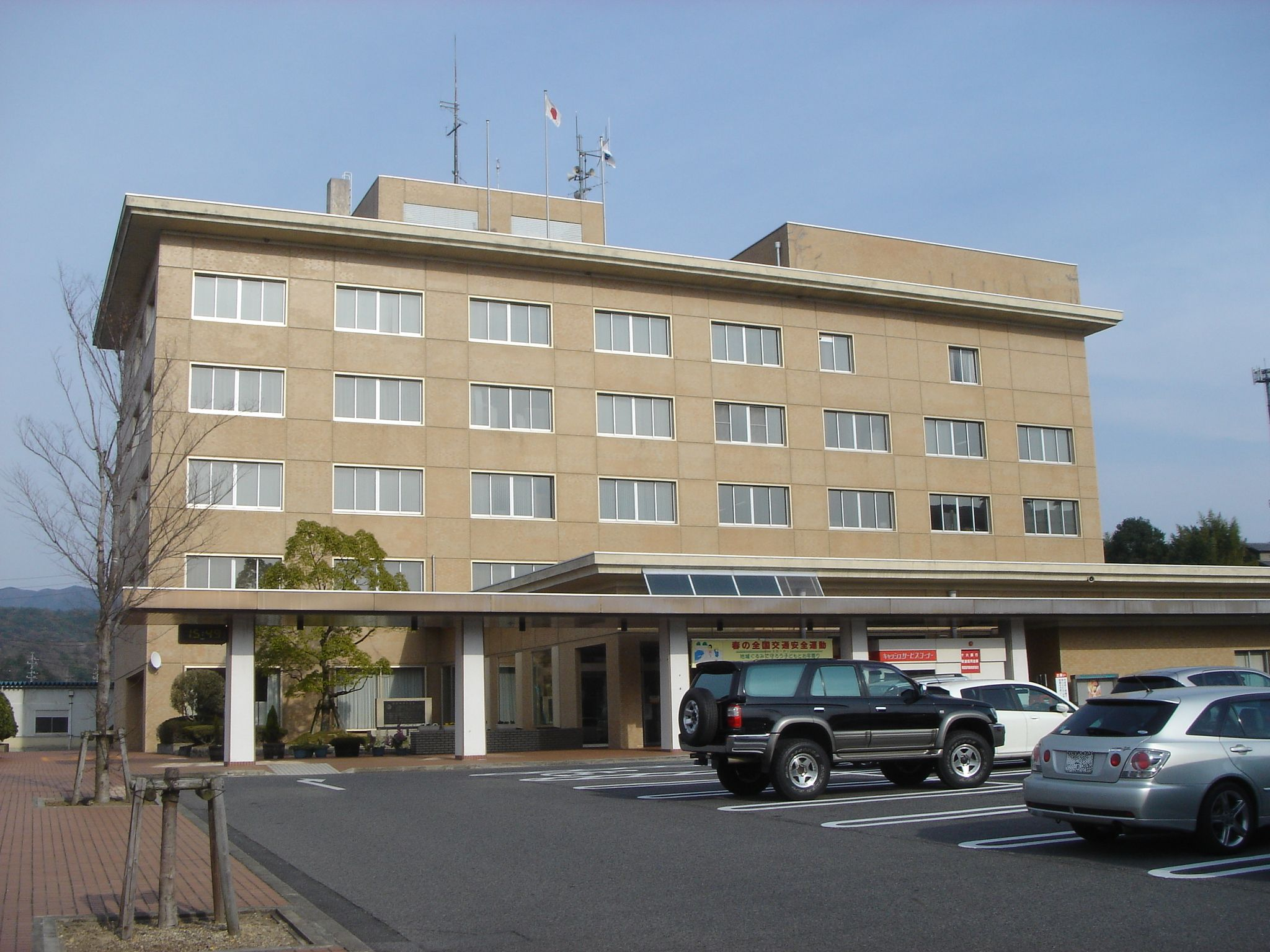
- Mizunami City Hall

- Flag Seal

- Location of Mizunami in Gifu Prefecture

- Coordinates: 35°21′42.5″N 137°15′16.2″E
- Country: Japan
- Region: Chūbu
- Prefecture: Gifu

Government
  - Mayor: Kōji Mizuno

Area
  - Total: 174.86 km^{2} (67.51 sq mi)

Population (January 1, 2019)
  - Total: 37,705
  - Density: 215.63/km^{2} (558.48/sq mi)
- Time zone: UTC+9 (Japan Standard Time)
- City symbols
- Tree: Pine
- Flower: Balloon flower
- Bird: Japanese bush-warbler
- Phone number: 0572-68-2111
- Address: Uedaira-chō 1-1, Mizunami-shi, Gifu-ken 509-6195
- Website: Official website

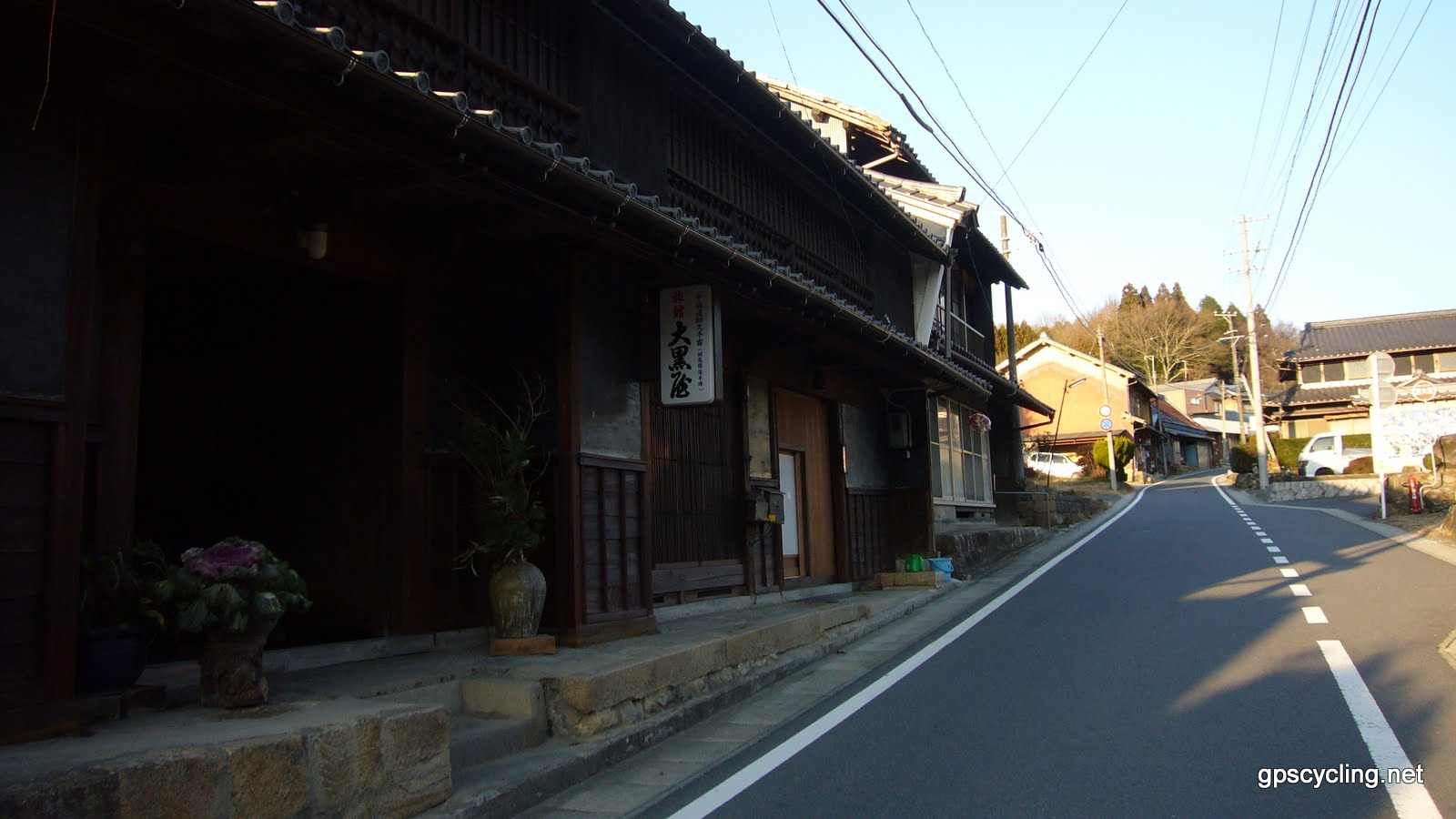
Hosokute-juku on the Nakasendō

Mizunami (瑞浪市, Mizunami-shi) is a city located in Gifu, Japan. As of 1 January 2019, the city had an estimated population of 37,705, and a population density of 220 persons per km^{2}. The total area of the city was 174.86 square kilometres (67.51 sq mi). Mizunami's biggest claim to fame came in 1995, when the largest ceramic plate in the world, as recognised by the Guinness Book of Records, was created by the Inatsu Town Planning Association in the city. It measures 2.8 metres in diameter.

== Geography ==
Mizunami is located in south-eastern Gifu Prefecture. The Kiso River and the Toki River flow through the city.

=== Climate ===
The city has a climate characterized by characterized by hot and humid summers, and mild winters (Köppen climate classification Cfa). The average annual temperature in Mizunami is 14.8 °C. The average annual rainfall is 1928 mm with September as the wettest month. The temperatures are highest on average in August, at around 27.2 °C, and lowest in January, at around 3.0 °C.

=== Neighbouring municipalities ===
- Aichi Prefecture
  - Toyota
- Gifu Prefecture
  - Ena
  - Mitake
  - Toki
  - Yaotsu

== Demographics ==
Per Japanese census data, the population of Mizunami peaked at around the year 2000 and has declined since.

Historical population
Year	Pop.	±%
1970	38,387	—
1980	40,066	+4.4%
1990	41,006	+2.3%
2000	42,298	+3.2%
2010	40,387	−4.5%
2020	37,150	−8.0%

== History ==
The area around Mizunami was part of traditional Mino Province. During the Edo period, the area was tenryō territory under direct control of the Tokugawa shogunate. The Nakasendō highway connecting Edo with Kyoto passed through the area, and Ōkute-juku and Hosokute-juku were located within what are now the city limits. In the post-Meiji restoration cadastral reforms, Toki District in Gifu prefecture was created. The modern city was founded on April 1, 1954 by the merger of Mizunami-Toki Town with the villages of Kamado, Okute, and Hiyoshi.

== Government ==
Mizunami has a mayor-council form of government with a directly elected mayor and a unicameral city legislature of 16 members.

== Education ==
Mizunami has seven public elementary schools and five public middle schools operated by the city government, and one private combined middle/high school. The city has one public high school operated by the Gifu Prefectural Board of Education and one private high school. Chukyo Gakuin University has a campus in Mizunami.

== Transportation ==
=== Railway ===
- - JR Central - Chūō Main Line
  - Kamado - Mizunami

=== Highway ===
- Chūō Expressway
- National Route 19
- National Route 21
- National Route 363
- National Route 419

== Sister cities ==
- Liling, Hunan, China
- Selb, Bavaria, Germany
