= Kani District =

District in Gifu prefecture, Japan

Coordinates: 35.4324°N 137.146°E

Location of Mitake in Gifu Prefecture

Kani (可児郡, Kani-gun) is a district located in Gifu Prefecture, Japan. As of July 2011, the district has an estimated population of 18,709. The total area is 56.61 km^{2}.

There is only one town left in the district, Mitake.

== District Timeline ==
- April 1, 1982 - The town of Kani gained city status.
- May 1, 2005 - The town of Kaneyama was merged into the city of Kani.
