= Tokishi Station (Gifu) =

Railway station in Toki, Gifu Prefecture, Japan

CF13 Tokishi Station 土岐市駅
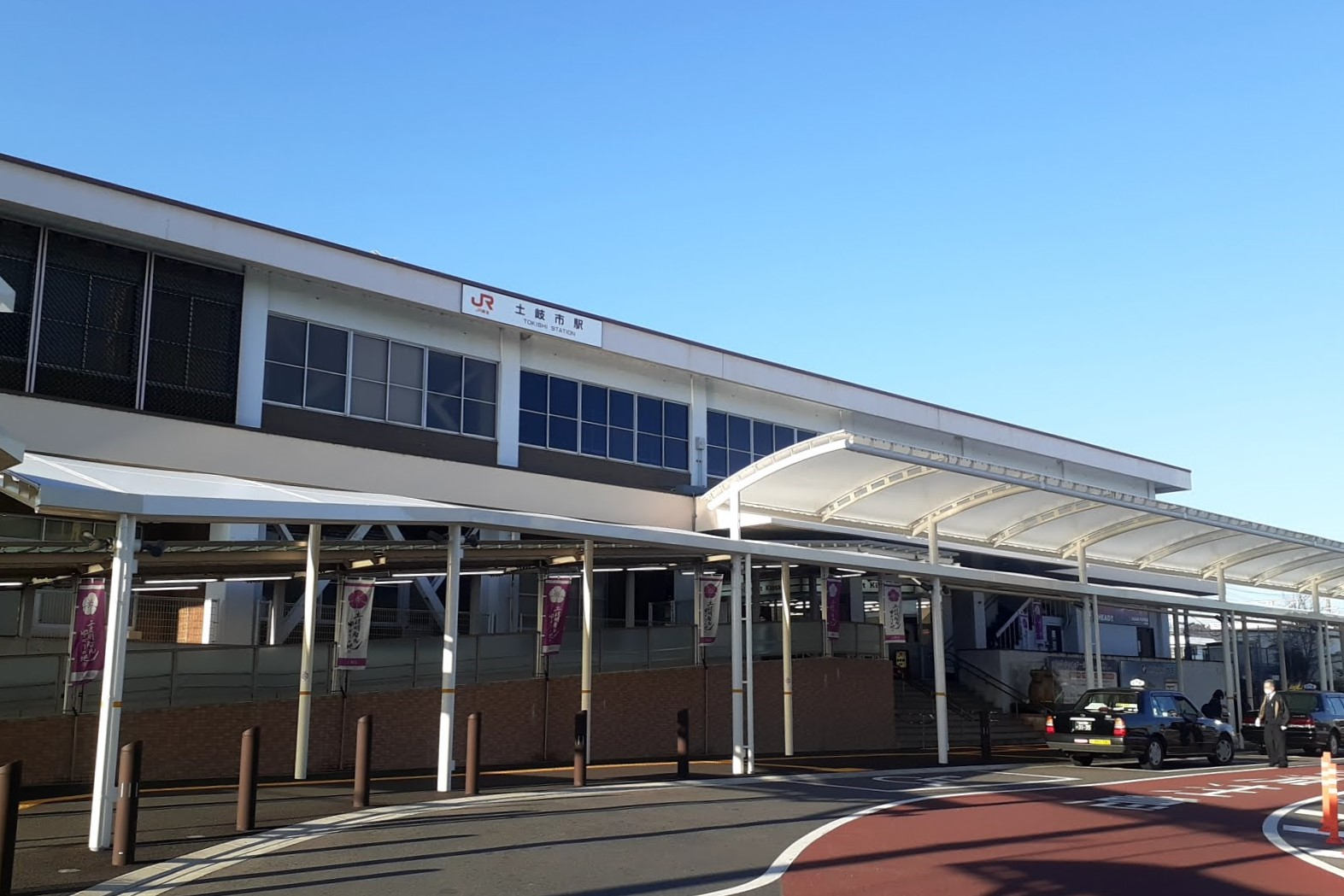
- Tokishi Station in 2021

General information
- Location: 572-3 Izumi-cho, Kujiri, Toki-shi, Gifu-ken 509-5142; Japan
- Coordinates: 35.3597°N 137.182°E
- Operator: JR Central
- Line: Chūō Main Line
- Distance: 353.7 km from Tokyo
- Platforms: 1 side + 1 island platform
- Tracks: 3

Other information
- Status: Staffed Midori no Madoguchi)
- Station code: CF13
- Website: Official website

History
- Opened: 21 December 1902; 123 years ago
- Former names: Tokitsu (to 1965)

Passengers
- FY2016: 5354 daily
Location
- Location within Gifu Prefecture Location within Japan

Tokishi Station (土岐市駅, Tokishi-eki) is a railway station in the city of Toki, Gifu Prefecture, Japan, operated by Central Japan Railway Company (JR Tōkai).

== Lines ==
Tokishi Station is served by the JR Tōkai Chūō Main Line, and is located 353.7 kilometers from the official starting point of the line at Tokyo and 43.2 kilometers from Nagoya.

== Layout ==
The station has one ground-level side platform and one ground-level island platform connected by a footbridge. The station has a Midori no Madoguchi staffed ticket office.

=== Platforms ===
1, 2	■ Chūō Main Line	For Tajimi and Nagoya
3	■ Chūō Main Line	For Nakatsugawa and Nagano

== Adjacent stations ==
«	Service	»
JR Central
Chūō Main Line
Mizunami	Home Liner	Tajimi
Mizunami	Central Liner	Tajimi
Mizunami	Rapid	Tajimi
Mizunami	Local	Tajimi

== History ==
Tokishi Station was opened on 21 December 1902 as Tokitsu Station (土岐津駅). It was renamed to its present name on 1 July 1965. On 1 April 1987, it became part of JR Tōkai.

=== Former connecting lines ===
Until 1972, the Tono Railway Dachi Line ran a line from this station to Higashi-dachi Station. The line was formally closed in 1974 after failed attempts to repair a bridge on the line that had washed out two years prior.

== Passenger statistics ==
In fiscal 2016, the station was used by an average of 5354 passengers daily (boarding passengers only).

== Surrounding area ==
- Toki City Hall

== See also ==
- List of railway stations in Japan
