= Mino Thirty-three Kannon =

Buddhist temples in Gifu Prefecture, Japan

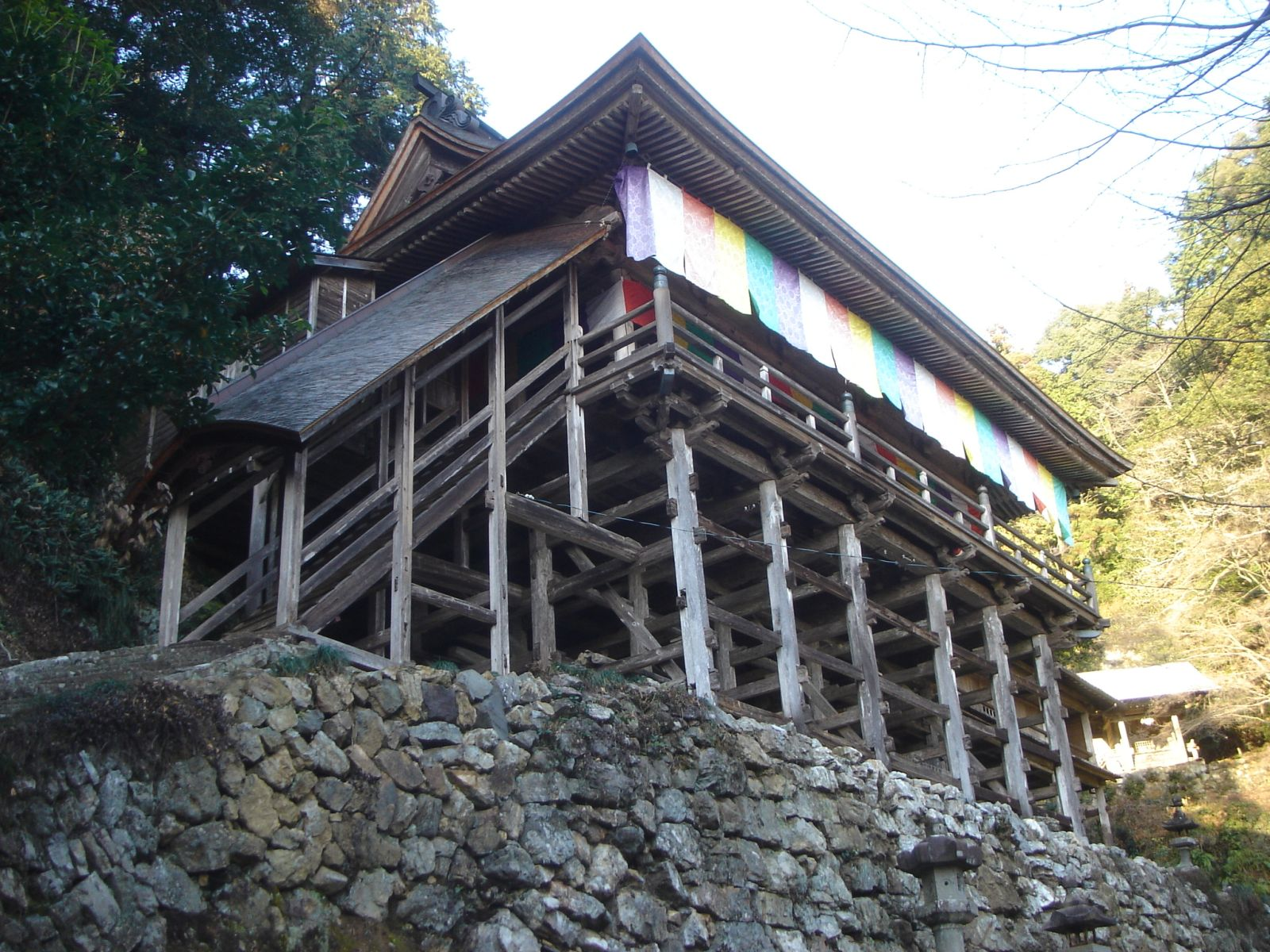
Nichiryūbu-ji

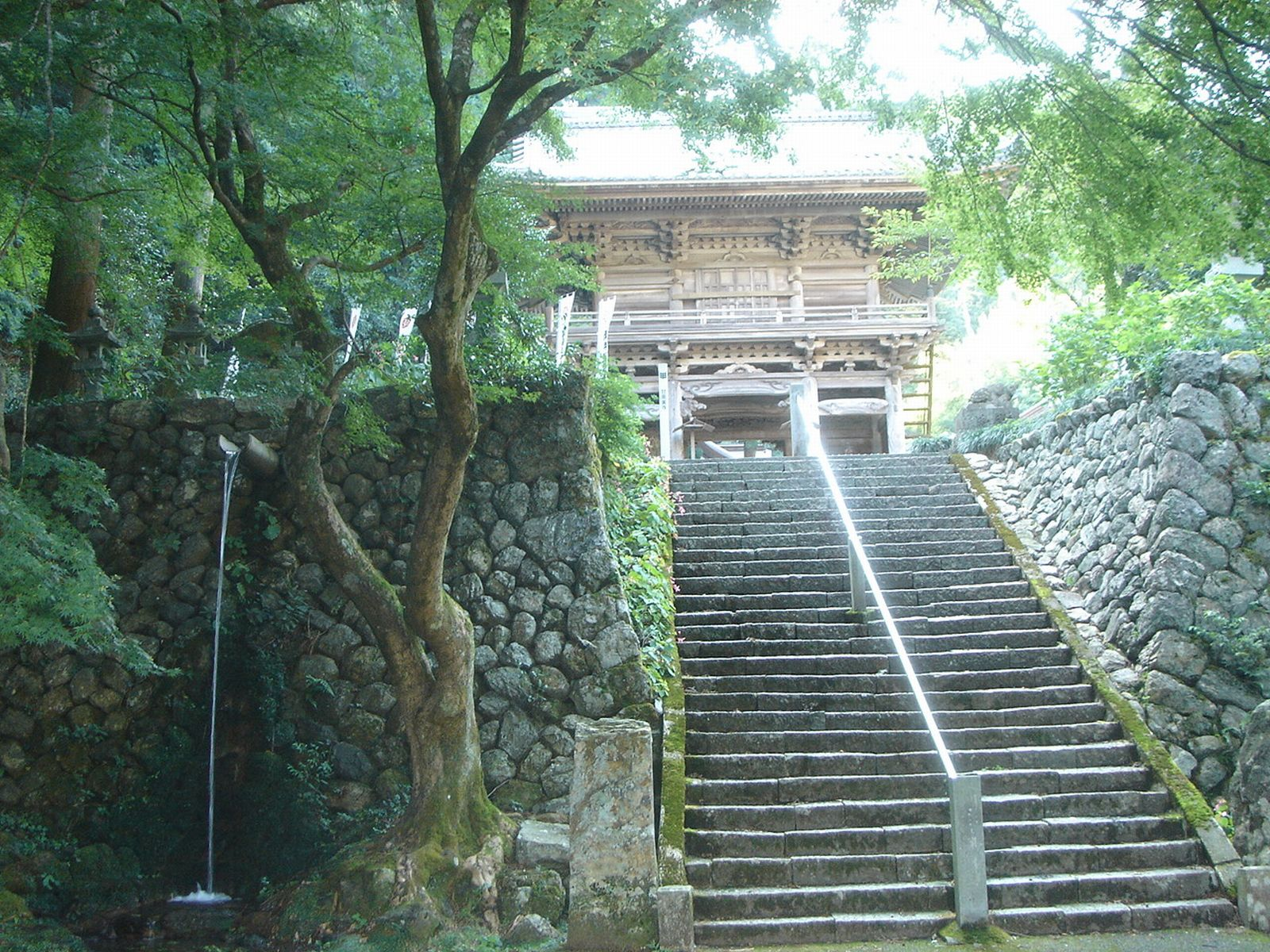
Kannami-ji

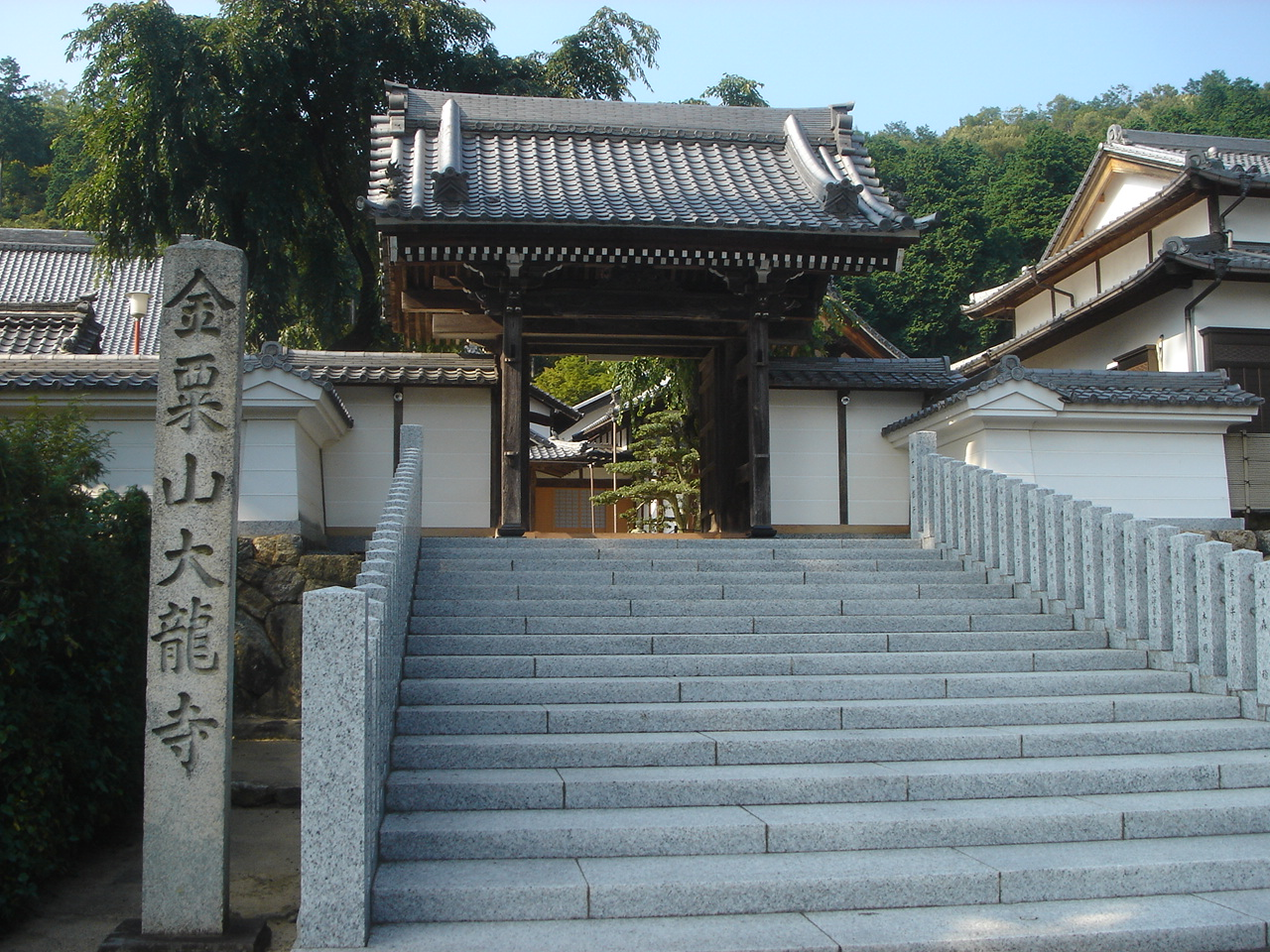
Dairyū-ji

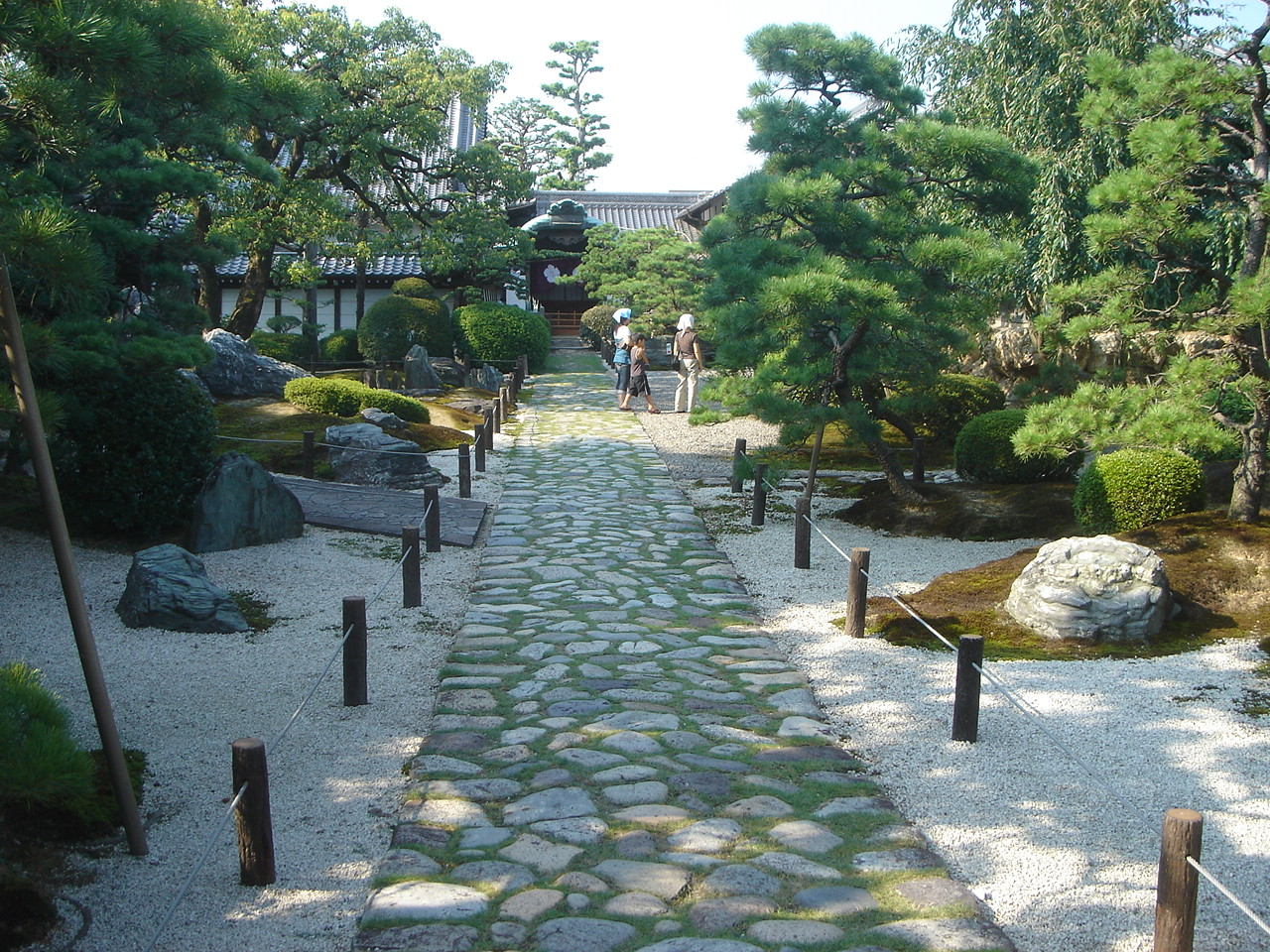
Path leading to Sōfuku-ji

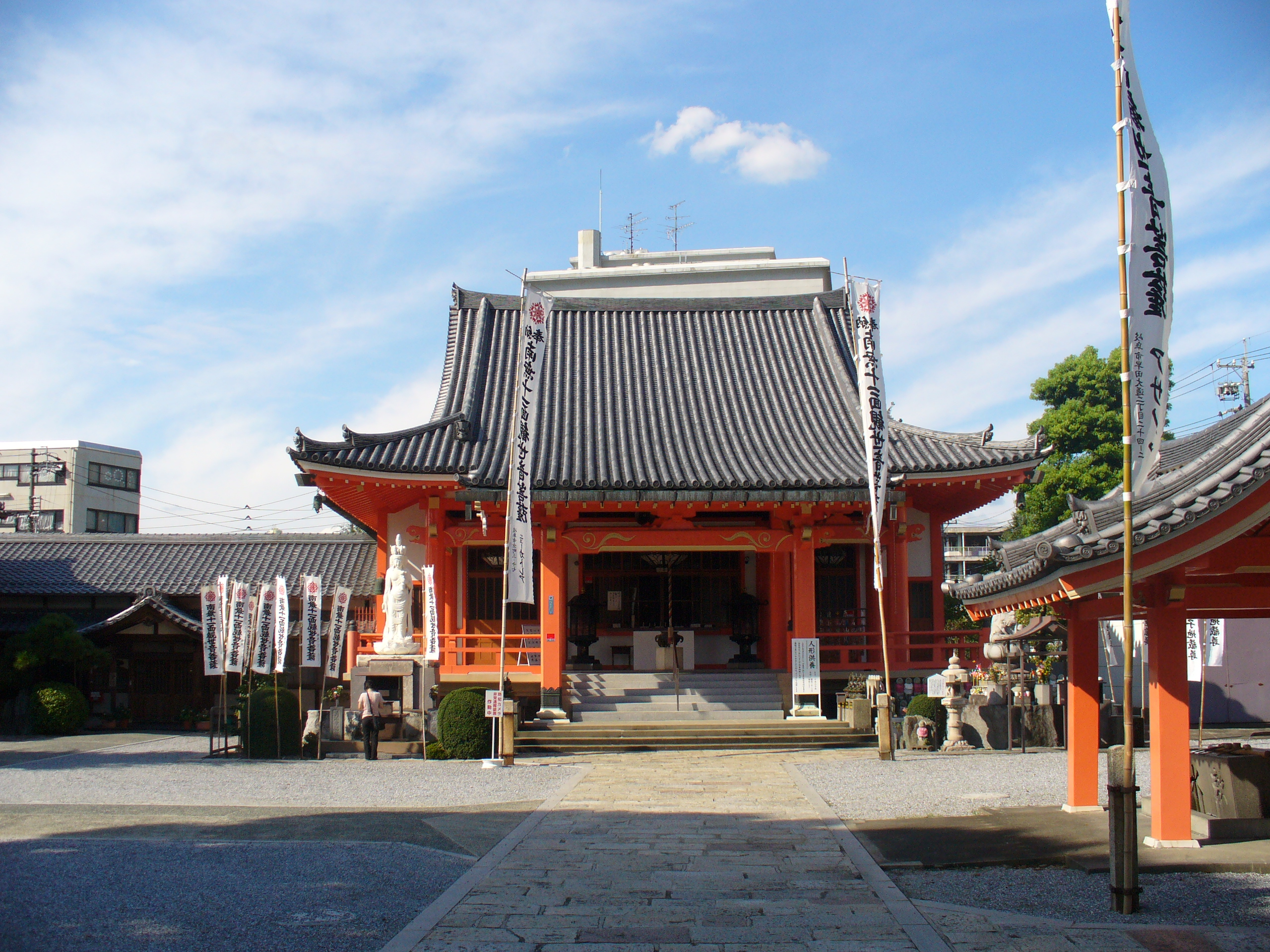
Mie-ji

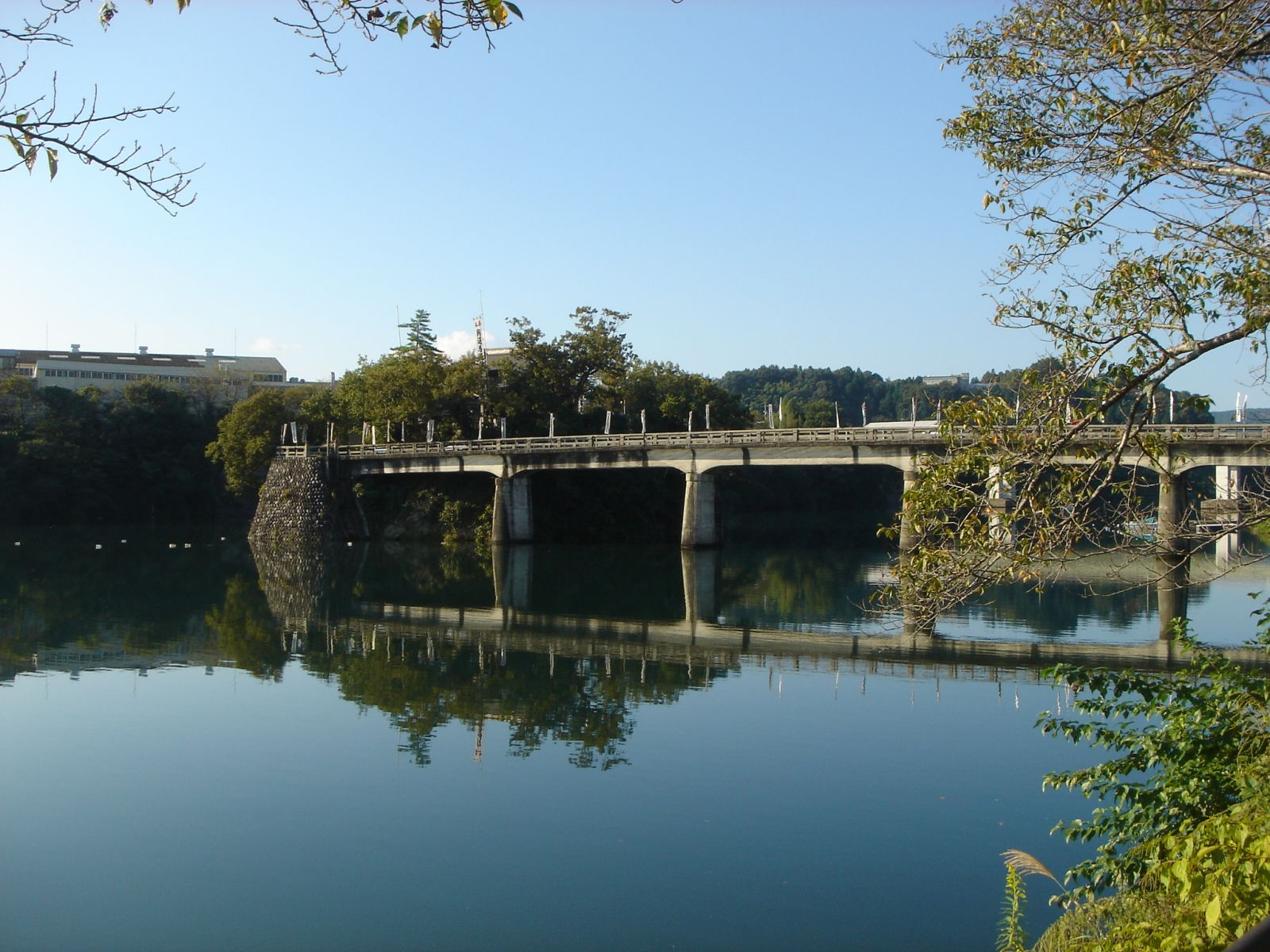
Bridge leading to Shōzan-ji

The Mino Thirty-three Kannon (美濃三十三観音, Mino Sanjūsan Kannon) are a collection of Buddhist temples in southern Gifu Prefecture, Japan. The name is derived from Mino Province, the former name for the area. The list was originally created during the mid-Edo period.

== Thirty-three Kannon ==
No.	Name	Japanese	Sangō	Sect	Location
1	Nichiryūbu-ji	日龍峰寺	Dainichi-san	Shingon	Seki
2	Rokuon-ji	鹿苑寺	Kongō-san	Rinzai	Mino
3	Raishō-ji	来昌寺	Chōei-zan	Pure Land	Mino
4	Hōshō-in	宝勝院	Konpira-san	Shingon	Mino
5	Eishō-ji	永昌寺	Kaiun-zan	Rinzai	Seki
6	Eri-ji	恵利寺	Ozaki-yama	Rinzai	Seki
7	Ryōfuku-ji	龍福寺	Iwaya-san	Rinzai	Seki
8	Sankō-ji	三光寺	Ryūō-san	Shingon	Yamagata
9	Tōkō-ji	東光寺	Fuji-san	Rinzai	Yamagata
10	Kōgon-ji	広厳寺	Hōun-zan	Rinzai	Yamagata
11	Dairyū-ji	大龍寺	Kinzoku-san	Rinzai	Gifu
12	Taikō-in	退耕院	Myōchi-zan	Rinzai	Minokamo
13	Kannami-ji	甘南美寺	Hakuka-san	Rinzai	Yamagata
14	Sōfuku-ji	崇福寺	Shingo-zan	Rinzai	Gifu
15	Hokke-ji	法華寺	Ryōju-san	Shingon	Gifu
16	Ganjō-ji	願成寺	Nyoi-zan	Shingon	Gifu
17	Gokokushi-ji	護国之寺	Yūsō-san	Shingon	Gifu
18	Mie-ji	美江寺	Dainichi-san	Tendai	Gifu
19	Enkyō-ji	円鏡寺	Chikyō-zan	Shingon	Kitagata
20	Guzei-ji	弘誓寺	Shigu-san	Rinzai	Yamagata
21	Hōshaku-ji	宝積寺		Rinzai	Sakahogi
22	Manshaku-ji	万尺寺		Rinzai	Minokamo
23	Kichijō-ji	吉祥寺	Shingū-yama	Rinzai	Seki
24	Jinkō-ji	神光寺		Shingon	Seki
25	Sōkei-ji	曹渓寺		Rinzai	Mino
26	Kiyomizu-dera	清水寺	Hakka-zan	Rinzai	Tomika
27	Yūsen-ji	祐泉寺	Iō-zen	Rinzai	Minokamo
28	Ryōfuku-ji	龍福寺	Rinza-san	Rinzai	Tomika
29	Shōzan-ji	小山寺		Rinzai	Minokamo
30	Zenpuku-ji	善福寺		Jōdo Shinshū	Gifu
31	Tokuun-ji	徳雲寺		Sōtō	Minokamo
32	Ryūzō-ji	立蔵寺		Sōtō	Seki
33	Shinchōkoku-ji	新長谷寺	Yoshida-yama	Shingon	Seki

== Tōkai Hundred Kannon ==
The Mino Thirty-three Kannon combine with the Owari Thirty-three Kannon in western Aichi Prefecture, the Mikawa Thirty-three Kannon in eastern Aichi Prefecture and Toyokawa Inari to form the Tōkai Hundred Kannon.

== See also ==
- Tōkai Hundred Kannon
  - Owari Thirty-three Kannon
  - Toyokawa Inari
- Glossary of Japanese Buddhism, for an explanation of terms concerning Japanese Buddhism
