= Mikawa Thirty-three Kannon =

Buddhist temples in Aichi Prefecture, Japan

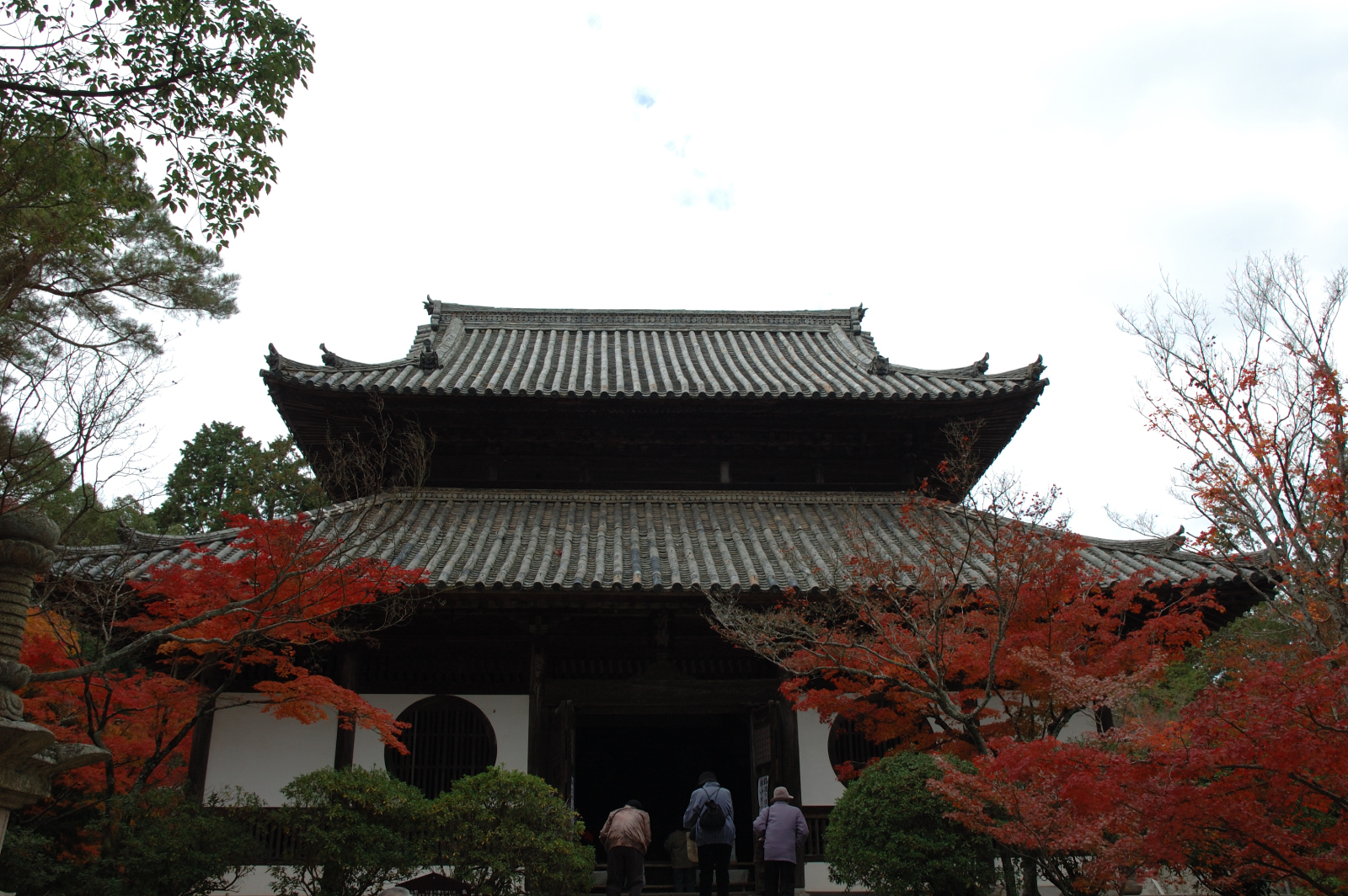
Hōfuku-ji

The Mikawa Thirty-three Kannon (三河三十三観音, Mikawa Sanjūsan Kannon) are a collection of Buddhist temples in eastern Aichi Prefecture, Japan, most of which are near Mikawa Bay. The name is derived from Mikawa Province, the former name for the area.

== Thirty-three Kannon ==
No.	Name	Japanese	Sangō	Sect	Location
1	Hōfuku-ji	宝福寺	I-yama	Sōtō	Okazaki
2	Zuinen-ji	随念寺		Jōdo shū	Okazaki
3	Daiju-ji	大樹寺	Jōdō-san	Jōdo-shū	Okazaki
4	Kannon-ji	観音寺		Sōtō	Okazaki
5	Shōō-ji	松応寺		Jōdo-shū	Okazaki
6	Jōsei-in	浄誓院		Jōdo-shū	Okazaki
7	Ryūkai-in	龍海院		Sōtō	Okazaki
8	Anshin-in	安心院		Sōtō	Okazaki
9	Kannon-ji	観音寺		Jōdo-shū	Okazaki
10	Tokushō-ji	徳性寺		Jōdo-shū	Okazaki
11	Ishin-ji	渭信寺		Sōtō	Okazaki
12	Hōzō-ji	法蔵寺	Nison-zan	Jōdo-shū	Okazaki
13	Tenkei-in	天桂院		Sōtō	Gamagōri
14	Kaiō-ji	善応寺		Jōdo-shū	Gamagōri
15	Eikō-ji	永向寺		Jōdo-shū	Gamagōri
16	Risei-in	利生院		Jōdo-shū	Gamagōri
17	Shinnyo-ji	真如寺		Jōdo-shū	Gamagōri
18	Fuda-ji	補蛇寺		Jōdo-shū	Gamagōri
19	Taizan-ji	太山寺		Shingon	Hazu
20	Myōzen-ji	妙善寺		Jōdo-shū	Hazu
21	Tokurin-ji	徳林寺		Jōdo-shū	Hazu
22	Unkō-ji	運光院		Jōdo-shū	Kira
23	Shōbō-ji	正法寺		Sōtō	Kira
24	Hōshu-in	宝珠院		Sōtō	Kira
25	Seifuku-ji	西福寺		Jōdo-shū	Kira
26	Kaizō-ji	海蔵寺		none	Kira
27	Konren-ji	金蓮寺		Sōtō	Kira
28	Kezō-ji	華蔵寺		Rinzai	Kira
29	Jissōankokuzen-ji	実相安国禅寺		Rinzai	Nishio
30	Seigan-ji	盛巌寺		Sōtō	Nishio
31	Kōzen-ji	康全寺		Sōtō	Nishio
32	Hōgonni-ji	法厳尼寺		Sōtō	Nishio
33	Chōen-ji	長円寺		Sōtō	Nishio

== Tōkai Hundred Kannon ==
The Mikawa Thirty-three Kannon combine with the Mino Thirty-three Kannon in Gifu Prefecture, the Owari Thirty-three Kannon in western Aichi Prefecture and Toyokawa Inari to form the Tōkai Hundred Kannon.

== See also ==
- Glossary of Japanese Buddhism (for an explanation of terms concerning Japanese Buddhism)
