= Ōsu Kannon =

Building in Naka-ku, Aichi Prefecture, Japan

Coordinates: 35.1598°N 136.9°E

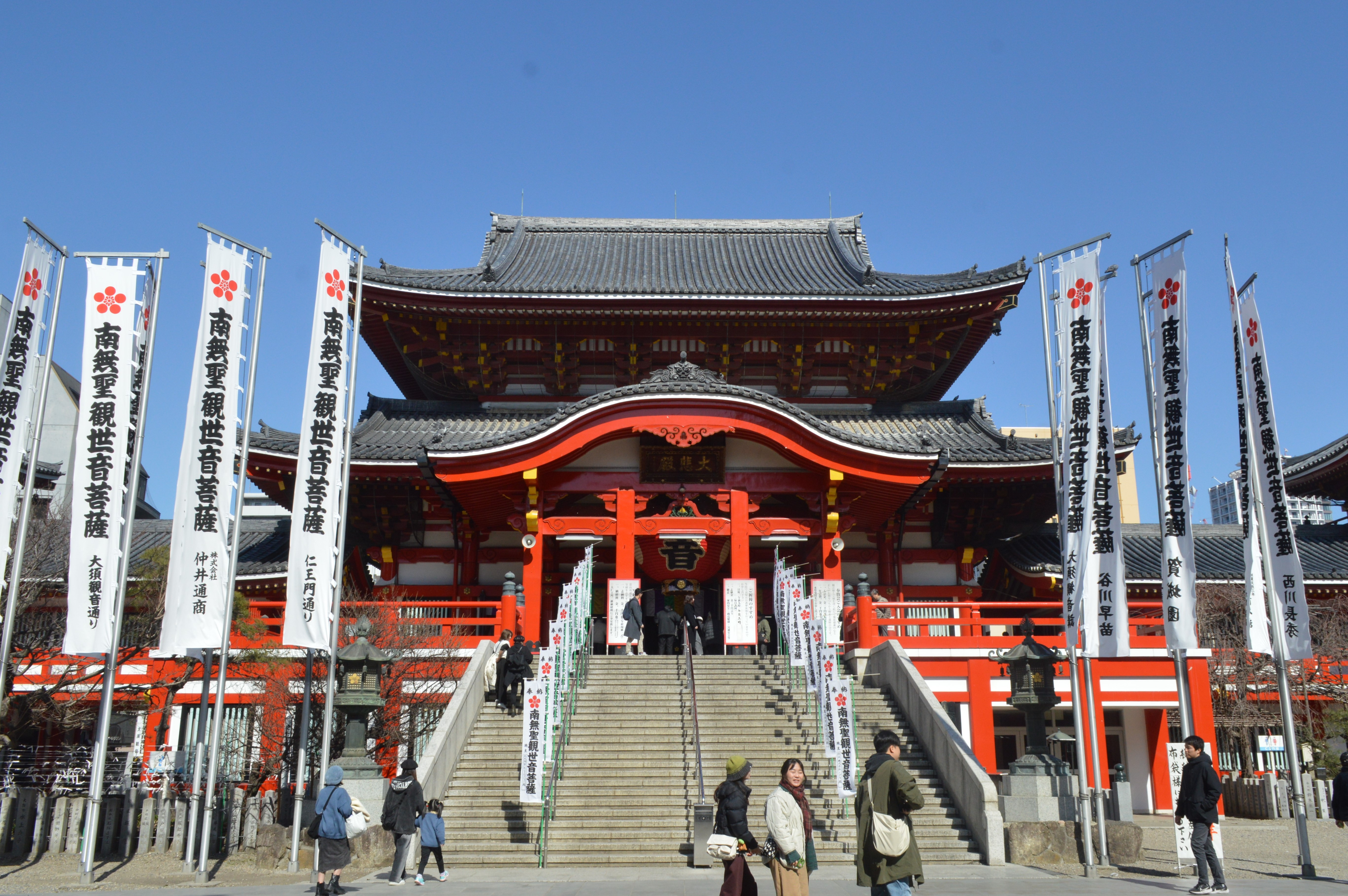
Ōsu Kannon, also known as Hōshō-in

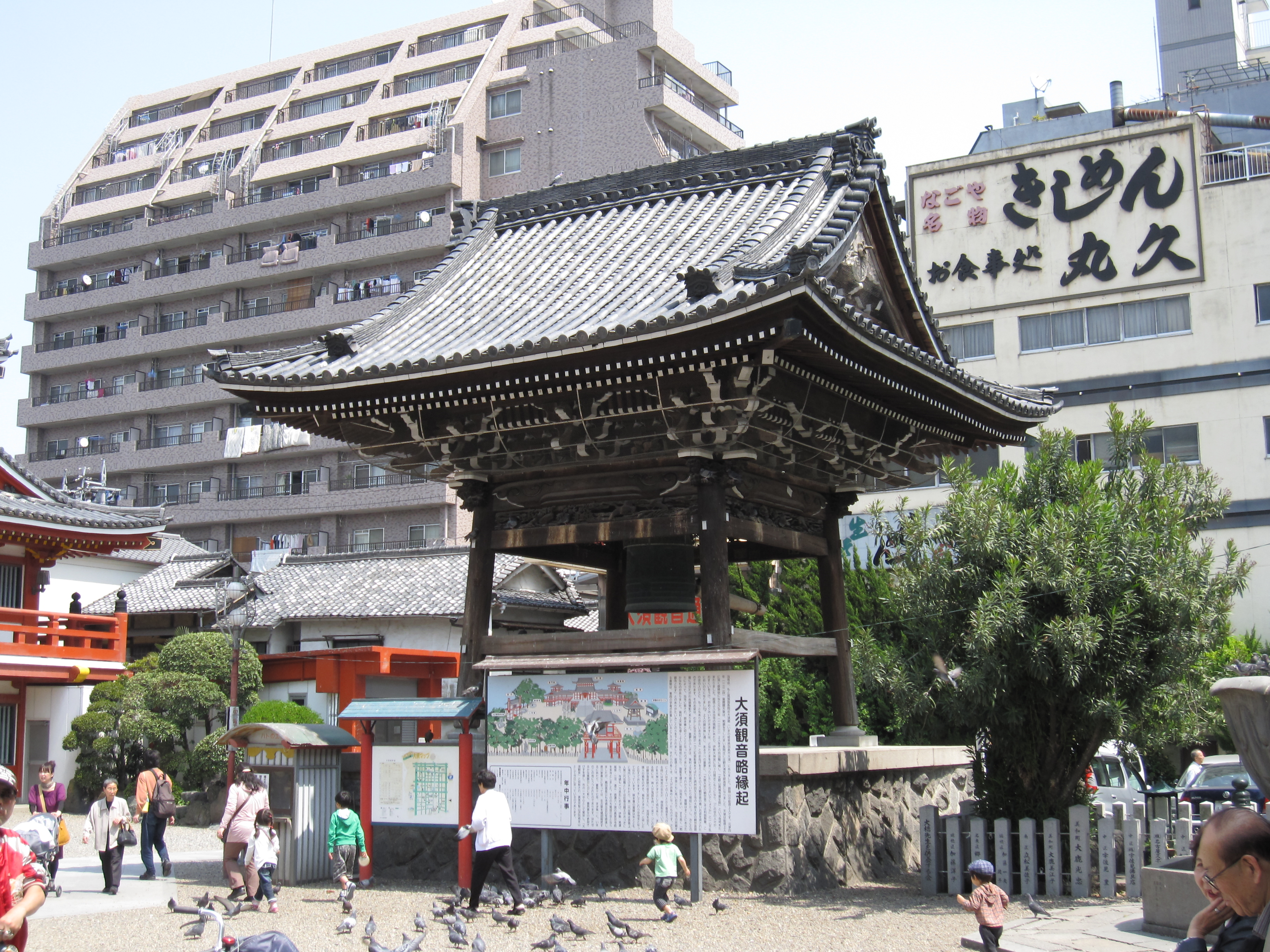
Wooden belfry

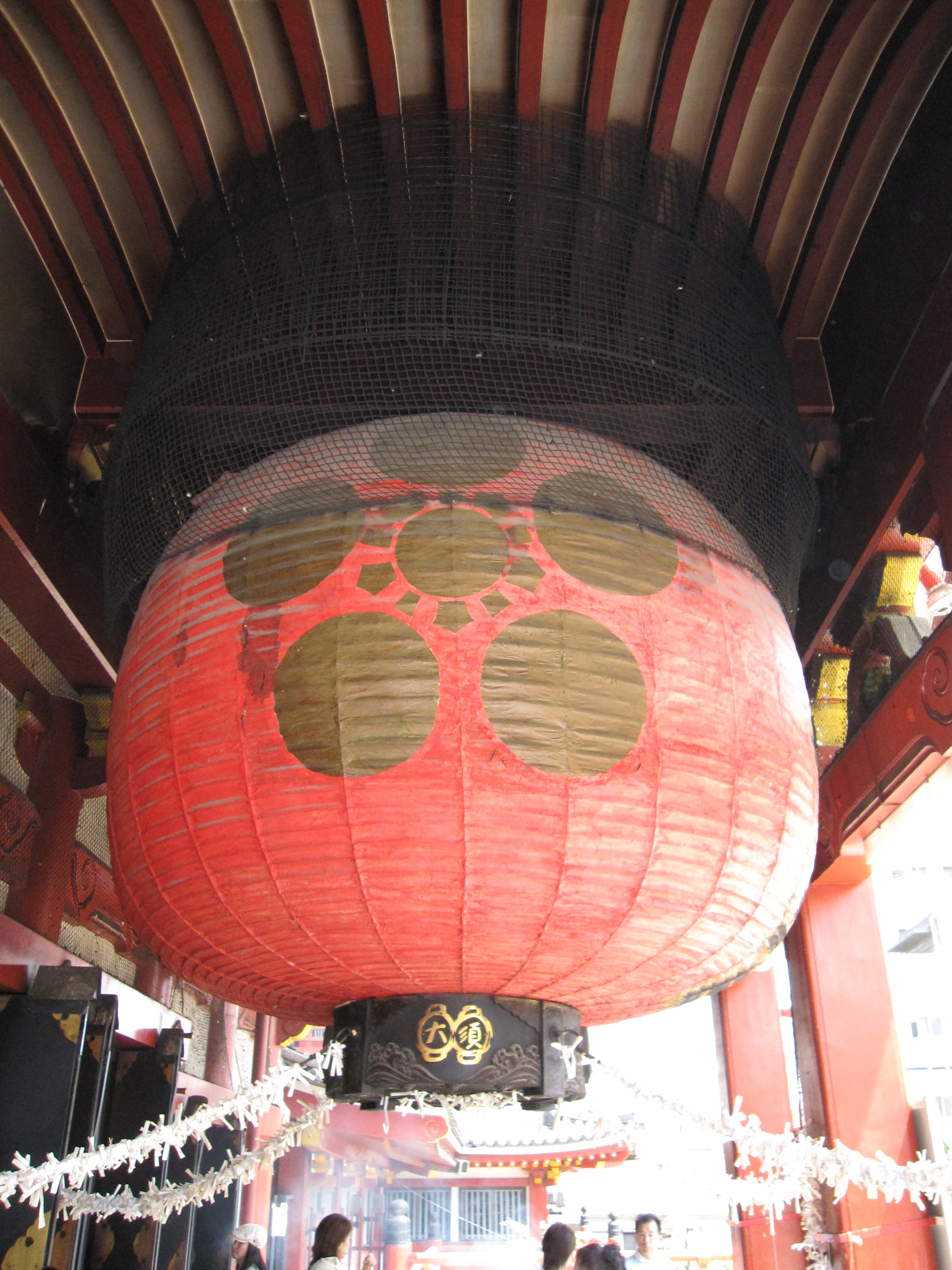
Giant red paper lantern

Ōsu Kannon (大須観音) is a Buddhist temple of the Shingon sect located in Ōsu, in central Nagoya, Japan. It belongs to the Owari Thirty-three Kannon. Its address is 愛知県名古屋市中区大須2-21-47 (Aichi Ken, Nagoya-shi, Naka-ku Osu, 2-21-47).

== History ==
The official name is Kitanosan Shinpuku-ji Hōshō-in, but is popularly known as Ōsu Kannon.

The temple was originally built in about the year 1333 in Ōsu-gō, Nagaoka village, in Owari Province, which is currently known as the city of Hashima in Gifu Prefecture. Construction was sponsored by the Emperor Go-Daigo, who appointed Shōnin Nōshin as the first head priest. Nōshin had a dream of Avalokitesvara, the Buddha of Compassion, known as Kannon in Japanese. Hence, the name Ōsu (from Ōsu-gō) Kannon. In the 3rd year of Genko (1333), a monk named Noshin founded the Shinpukuji Temple and its sub-temple Hojoin, which marked the beginning of this temple. They moved the Kannon statue from Shitennoji Temple in Settsu Province (modern-day Osaka) and enshrined it as the principal deity. Under the third chief priest, Prince Ninyo, the temple's estate grew to 10,000 koku (a unit of measure for rice fields), and it became an overseeing temple for Shingon sect temples in six provinces: Ise, Mino, Owari, Mikawa, Totomi, and Shinano. During the Sengoku (Warring States) Period, Oda Nobunaga granted the temple an additional 500 koku of land. In the 17th year of Keicho (1612), on the orders of Tokugawa Ieyasu, Hojoin, along with its main deity and the Shinpukuji library, was relocated from Osu-go to its current site by Naruse Masanari, the lord of Inuyama Castle.

In the 12th year of Bunka (1815), a five-story pagoda was erected, and a statue of Aizen Myoo carved by Kukai was enshrined within. On March 21, 1892 (Meiji 25), the main hall, five-story pagoda, and Niomon gate were destroyed by the fire that broke out behind the temple's Hoza theater (Osu's Great Fire). An account titled "Reconstruction Contribution Ledger" was written in April of the same year to raise funds for their reconstruction. The ledger contained drawings of the temple's layout for the main hall, five-story pagoda, and Niomon gate, detailing the reconstruction plans for these structures across five sections. While the main hall and Niomon gate were reconstructed after the fire, the five-story pagoda was not rebuilt.

In the midst of World War II, on March 19, 1945 (Showa 20), the temple was burnt down again during the Nagoya Air Raid. After the war, in 1949 (Showa 24), temporary main hall and Niomon gate were constructed. Hopes were high among the people of Osu and those connected to the temple for the early reconstruction of the proper main hall, considering Osu Kannon's significance as a symbol of Osu. However, due to financial difficulties, the reconstruction was considerably delayed. Due to repeated flooding, the temple was moved to its present location in 1612 by Tokugawa Ieyasu.

In the 1820s, large parts of the temple were destroyed by fire, but it was rebuilt in the 1970s. The main hall has a very large, red paper lantern hanging from the ceiling where worshipers can tie small paper notes with wishes to the holding wires.

== Library ==
The current temple is home to a large collection of books. It houses about 15,000 classic Japanese and Chinese works. The Records of Ancient Matters (古事記 Kojiki), a Shinpukuji manuscript (真福寺本) transcribed by the monk Ken'yu (賢瑜) is the oldest extant manuscript of the Kojiki and consists of three books that were written in 1371–1372 during the Nanboku-chō period. It describes the ancient mythological history of Japan. The library also has many other books designated as national treasures and important cultural properties.

== Market ==
A street fair is held on the 18th day of each month. A number of antiques are sold there.

The nearest subway is Ōsu Kannon Station.

== See also ==
- Hongan-ji Nagoya Betsuin, a temple nearby

== Sources ==
- Pictures of the temple
- Japan-guide.com
- Expo2005.or.jp
