= Mama Kannon =

Buddhist temple in Komaki, Aichi, Japan

Coordinates: 35°17′42″N 136°54′33″E

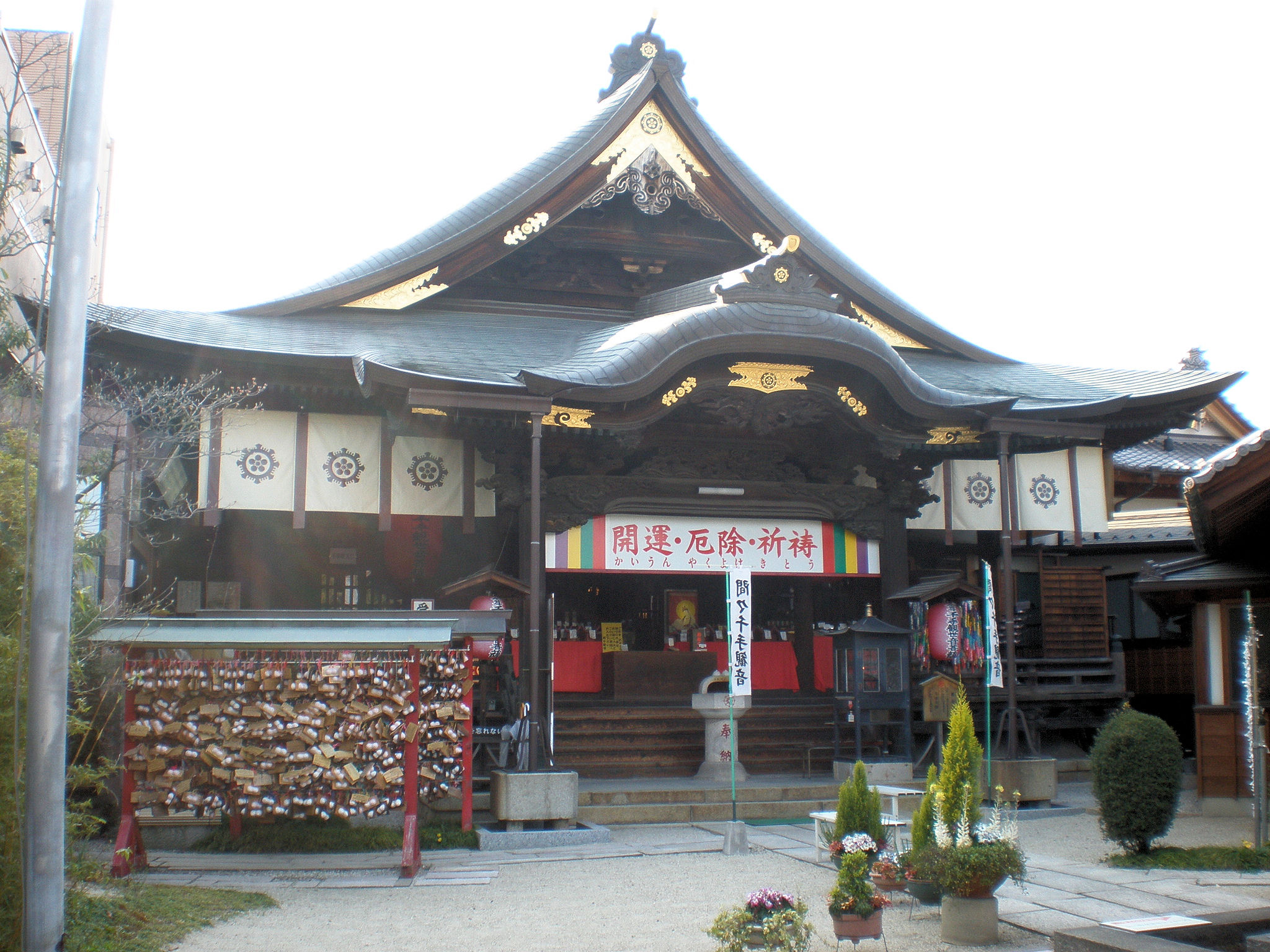
The temple's main hall

Mama Kannon Temple (間々観音), officially known as Ryūon-ji (龍音寺), is a Jōdo-shū Buddhist temple located in Komaki, Aichi Prefecture, Japan. It is the 24th temple on the Owari Thirty-three Kannon pilgrimage.

== Overview ==
The temple was formed in 1492, and was originally located on Mount Komaki, but was moved to its current location just North of the mountain by order of Oda Nobunaga. It is the 24th temple of the Owari Thirty-Three Kannon Temples and the fifth of the Owari Saigoku Thirty-Three Kannon Temples. The main image of the temple, the Thousand-Armed Kannon, is said to grant blessings for those who wish to breastfeed, and it is known as the only "breastfeeding temple" in Japan. According to legend, in 1665, a woman with lactation problems began to produce milk after praying in the temple and was able to breastfeed her child.

In the temple there are breast-shaped sculptures and carvings. Many pregnant women come to visit the temple for easy childbirth, healthy life and lactation.

== Gallery ==
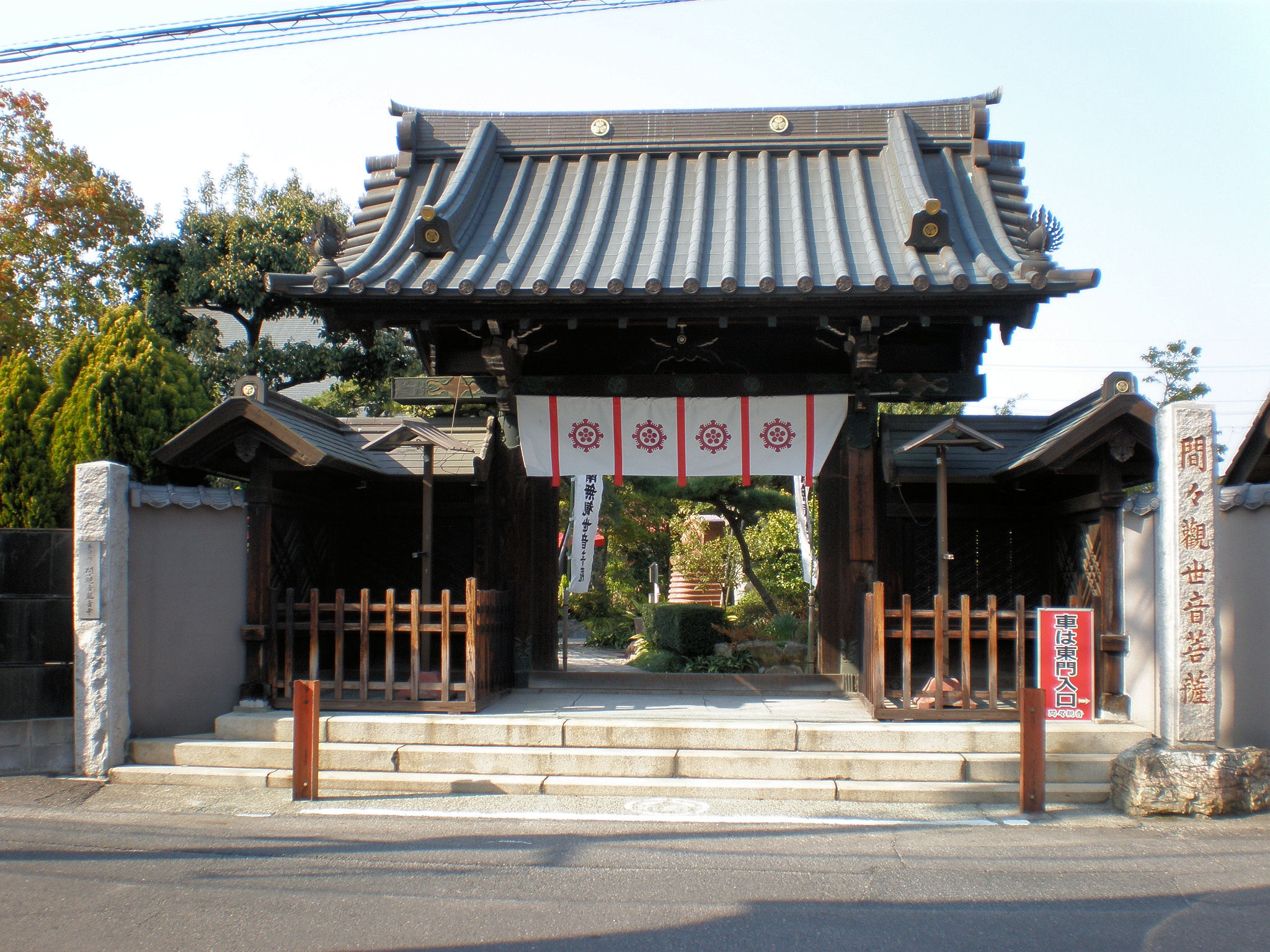
The temple gate

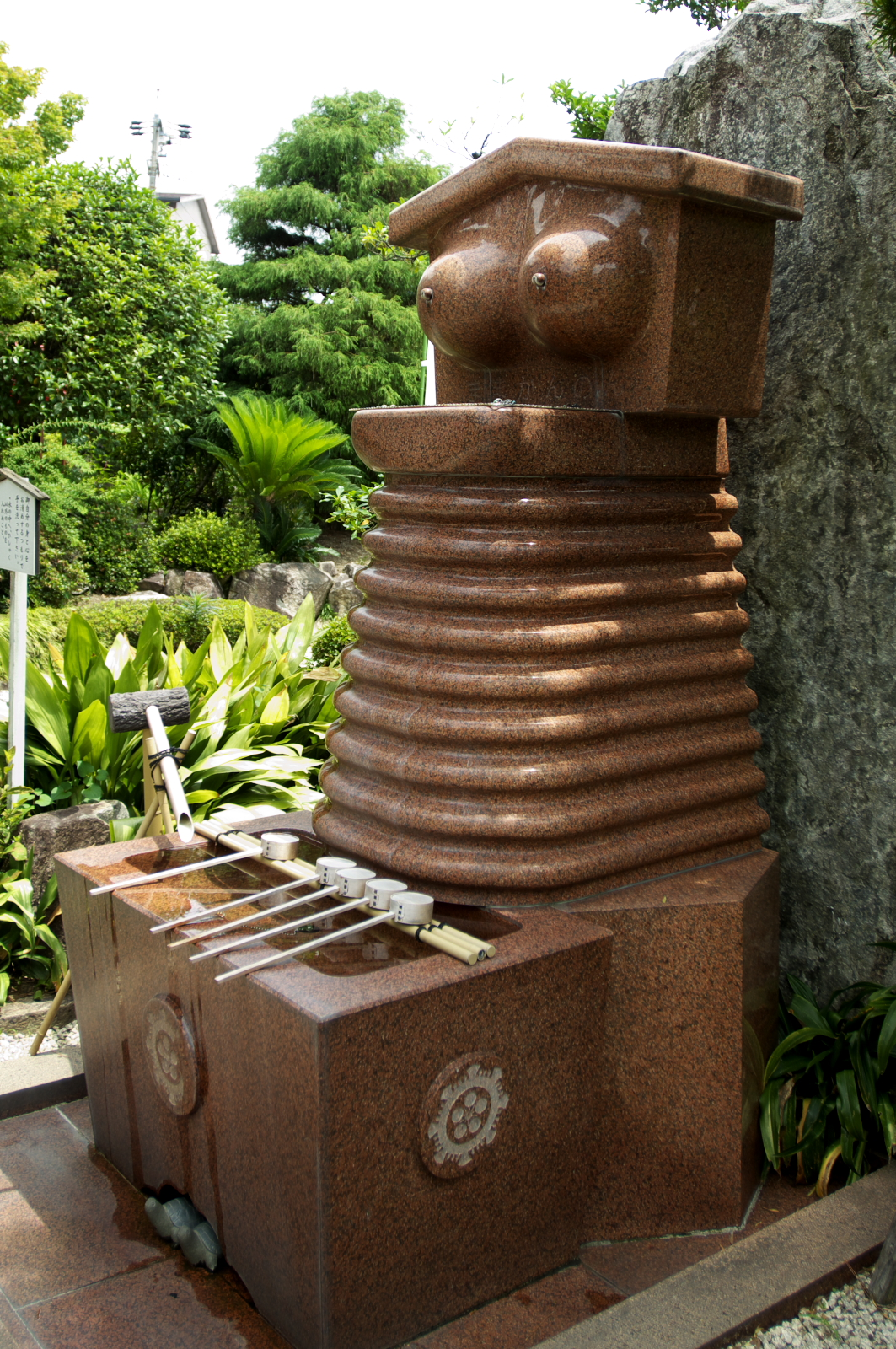
The chōzuya (purification fountain)

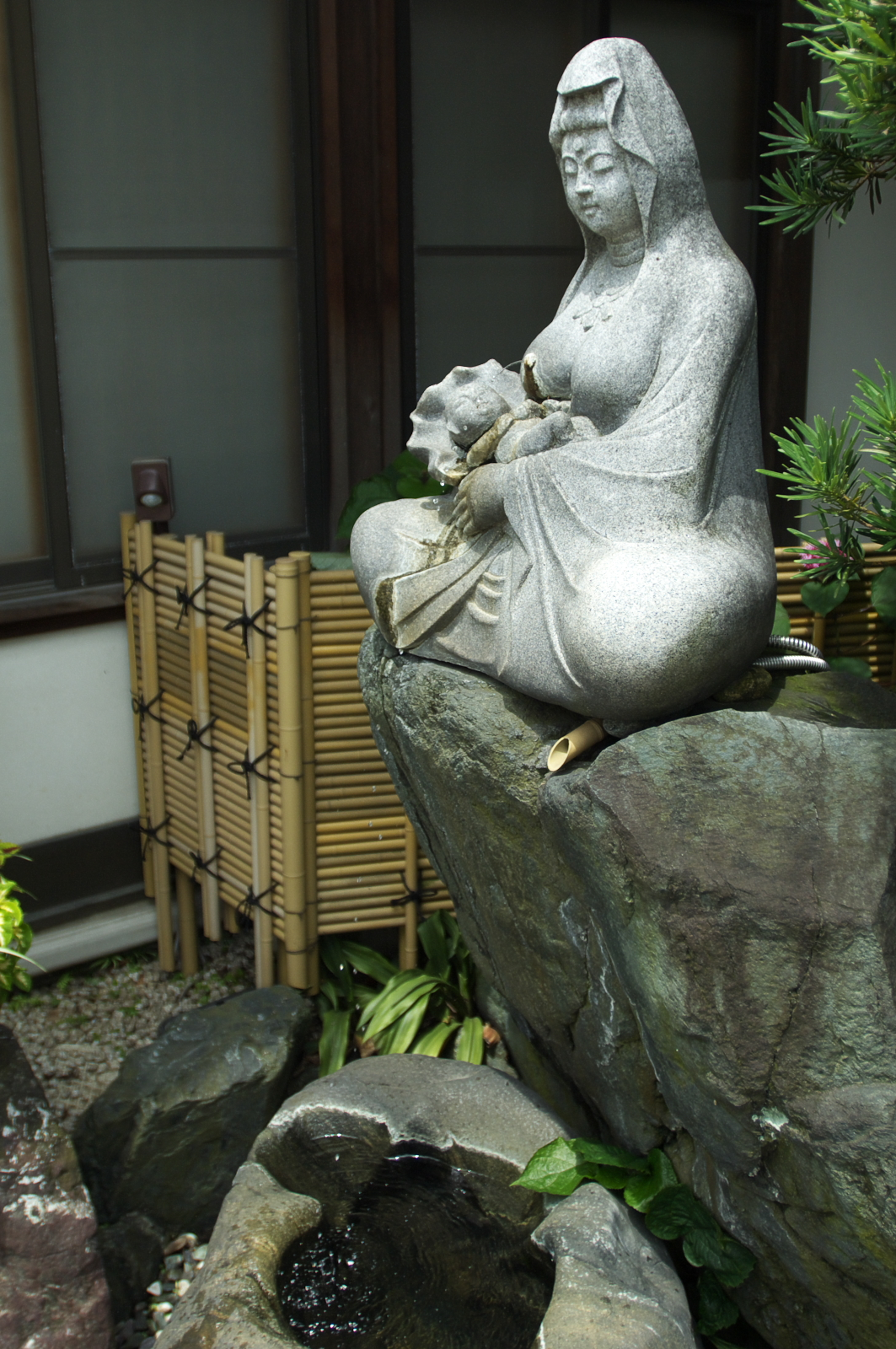
The central water fountain

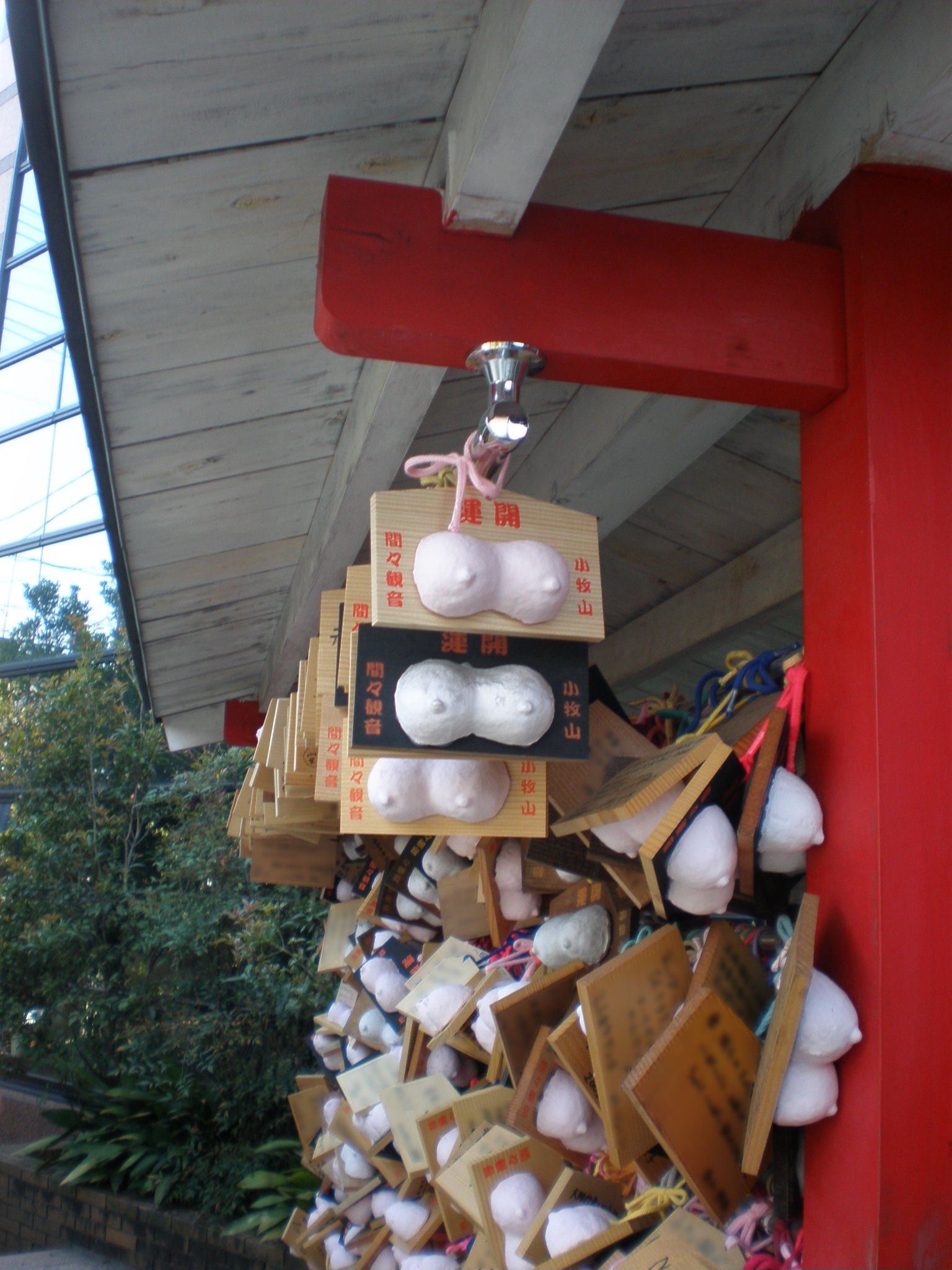
Ema boards dedicated to Kannon
