= Tōkai Hundred Kannon =

Collection of Buddhist temples in Japan

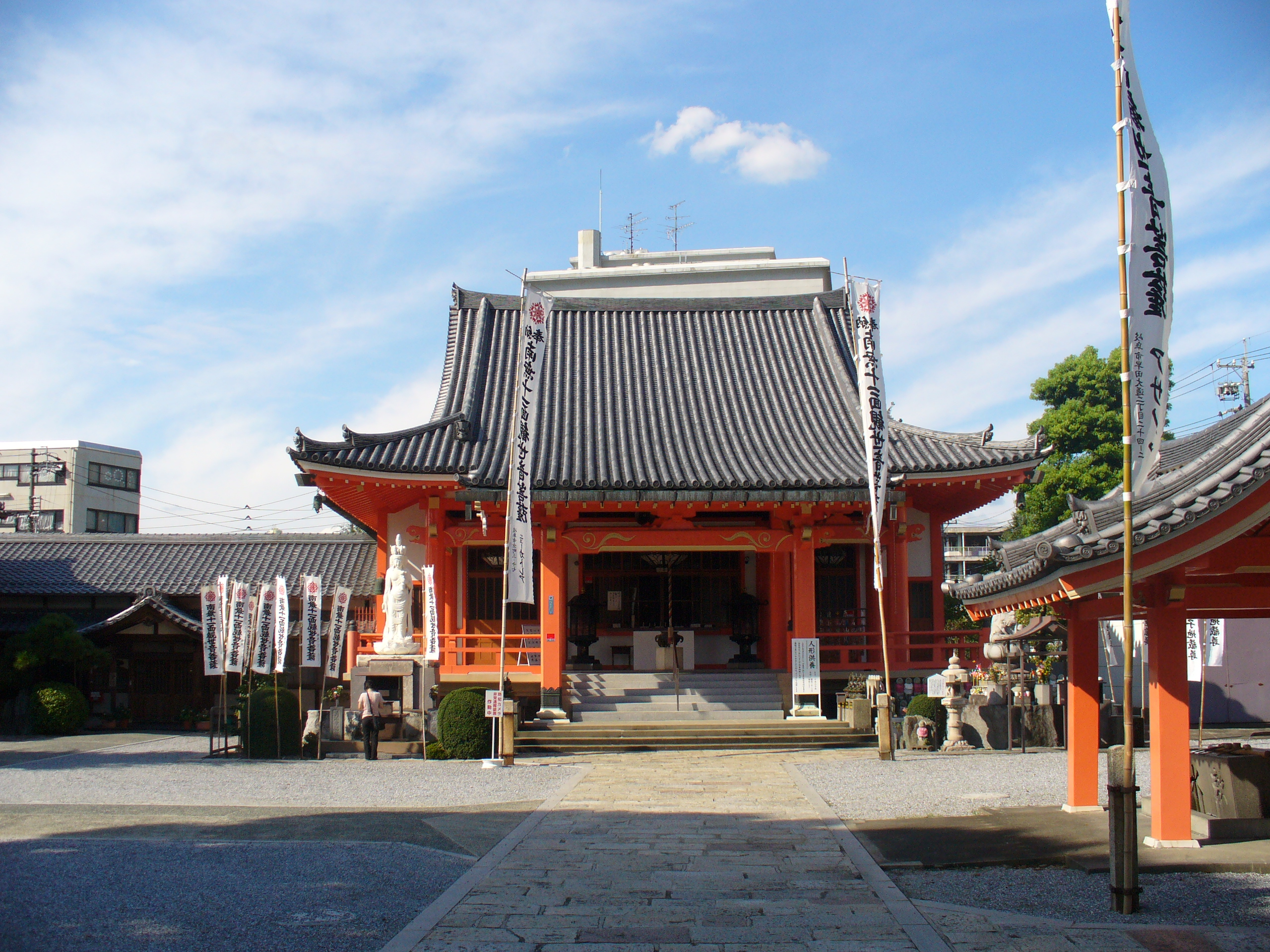
Mie-ji, the 18th of the Mino Thirty-three Kannon

The Tōkai Hundred Kannon (東海百観音, Tōkai Hyaku Kannon) are a collection of one-hundred Buddhist temples in the Tōkai region of central Honshū, Japan.

The Tōkai Hundred Kannon is made of up of the Mino Thirty-three Kannon in Gifu Prefecture, the Owari Thirty-three Kannon in western Aichi Prefecture, the Mikawa Thirty-three Kannon in eastern Aichi Prefecture, and Toyokawa Inari. Some religious observers go on a pilgrimage to visit these temples in a specific order.

== See also ==
- Tōkai Hundred Kannon
  - Mino Thirty-three Kannon
  - Owari Thirty-three Kannon
  - Toyokawa Inari
- Pilgrimage
