= Owari Thirty-three Kannon =

Buddhist temple in Aichi Prefecture, Japan

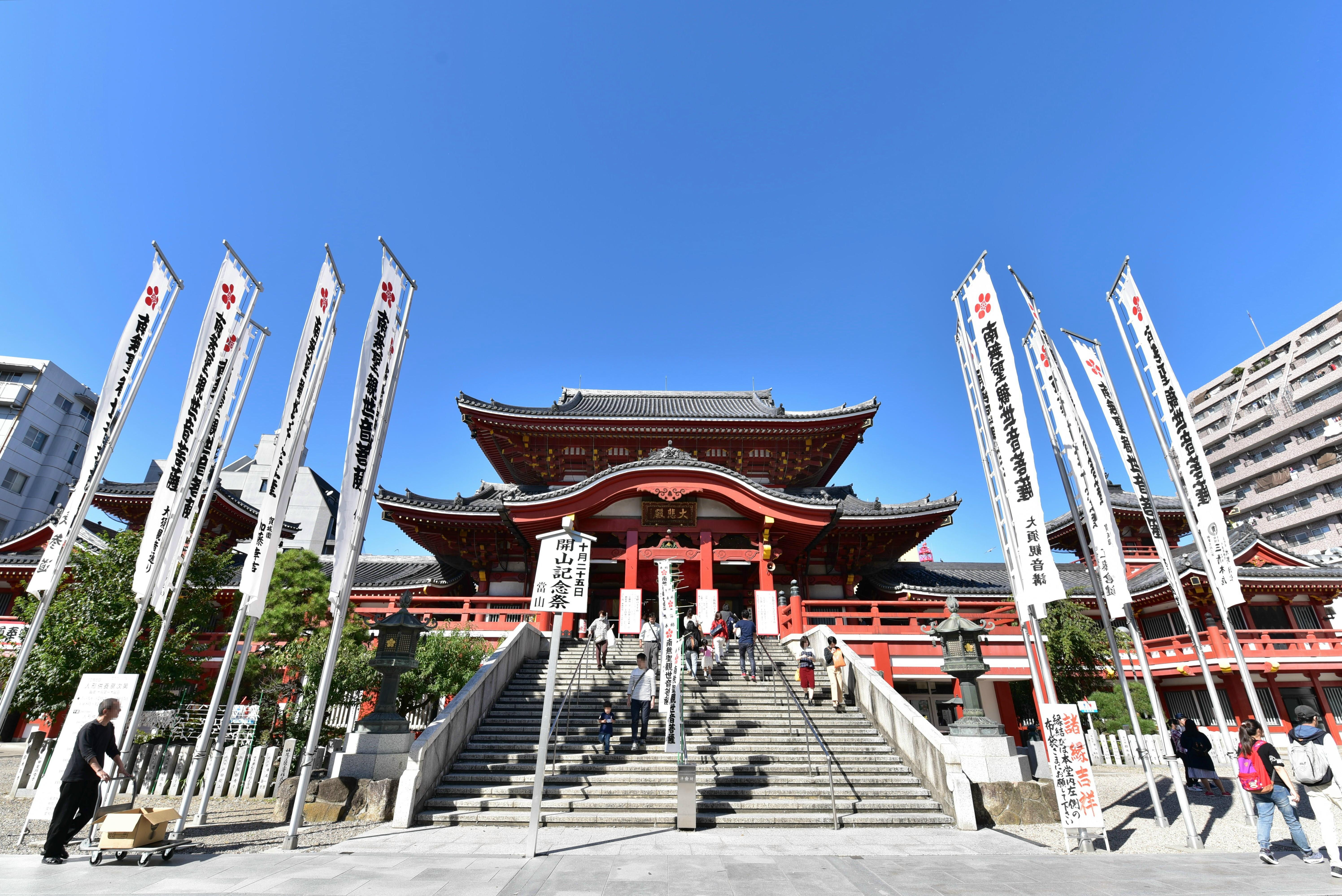
Hōshō-in/Ōsu Kannon

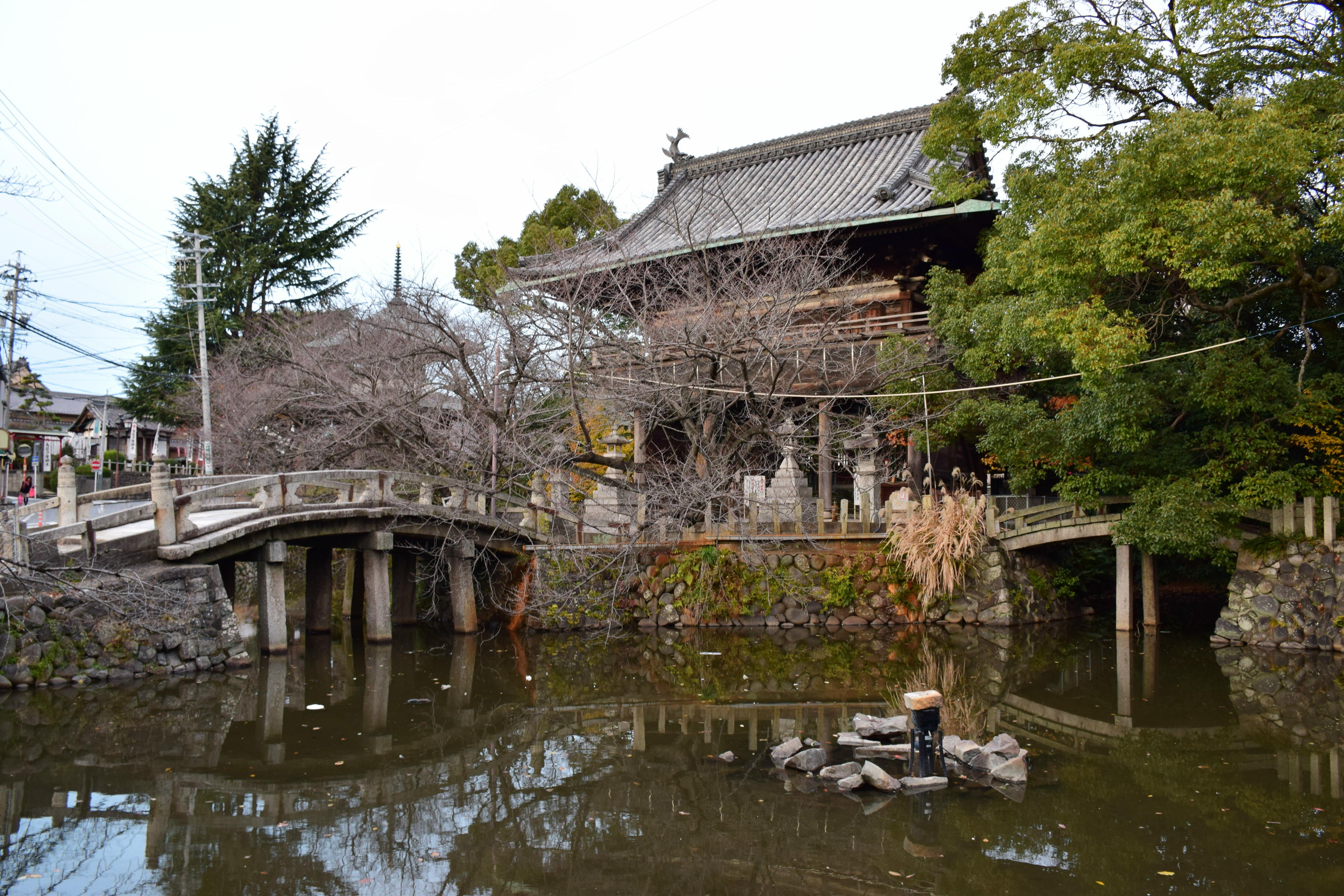
Ryūfuku-ji

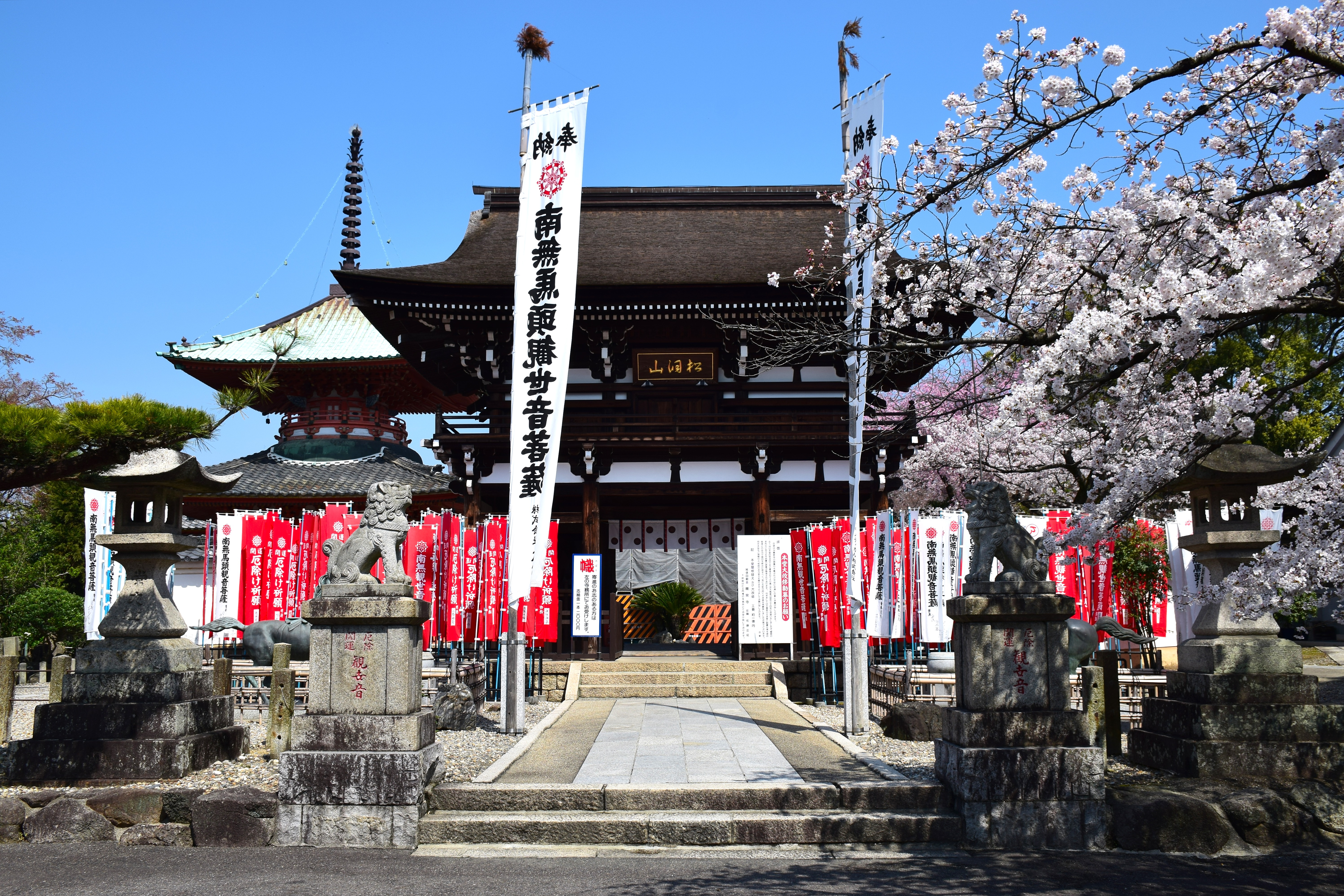
Ryūsen-ji

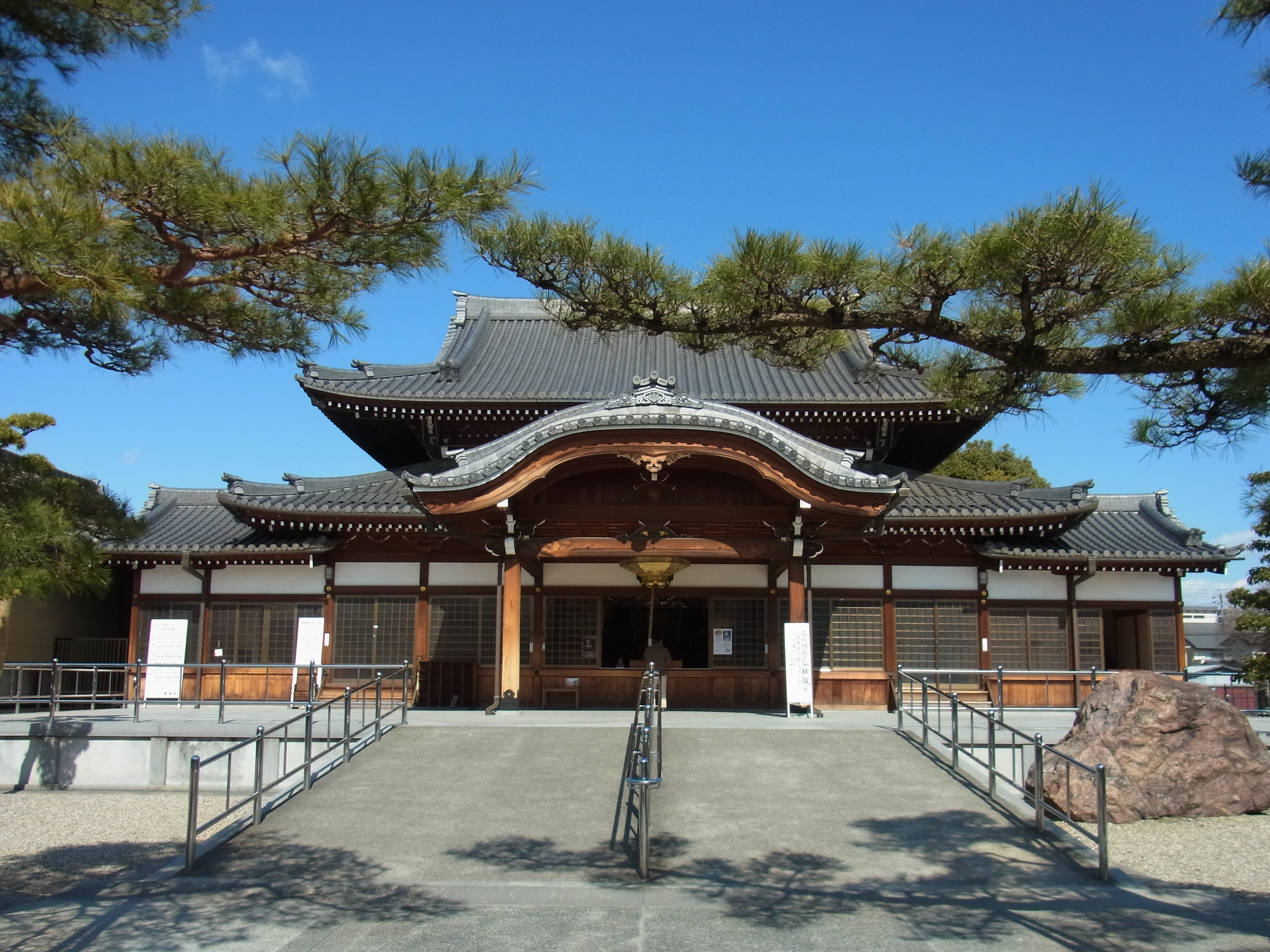
Kannon-ji

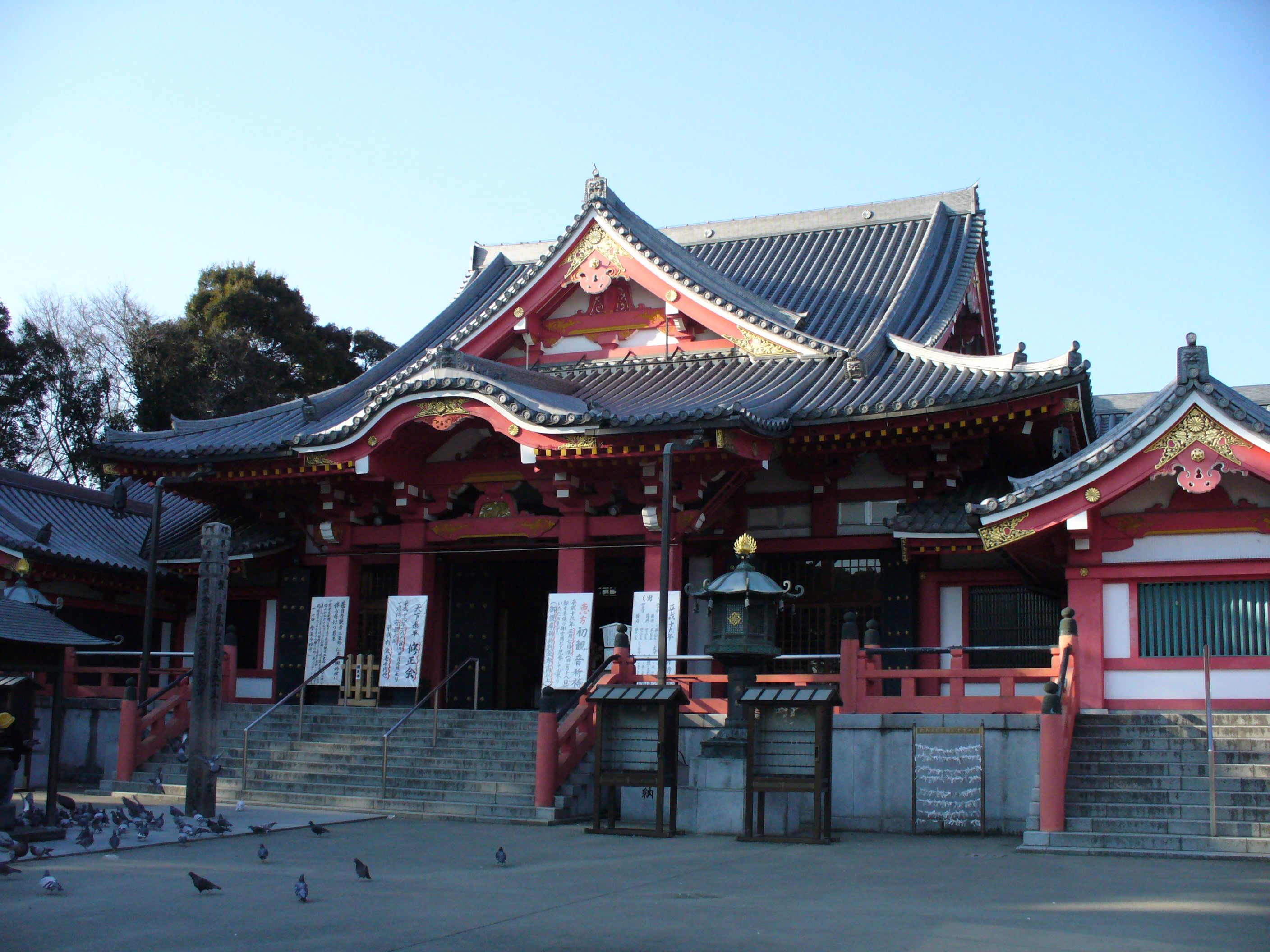
Jimoku-ji

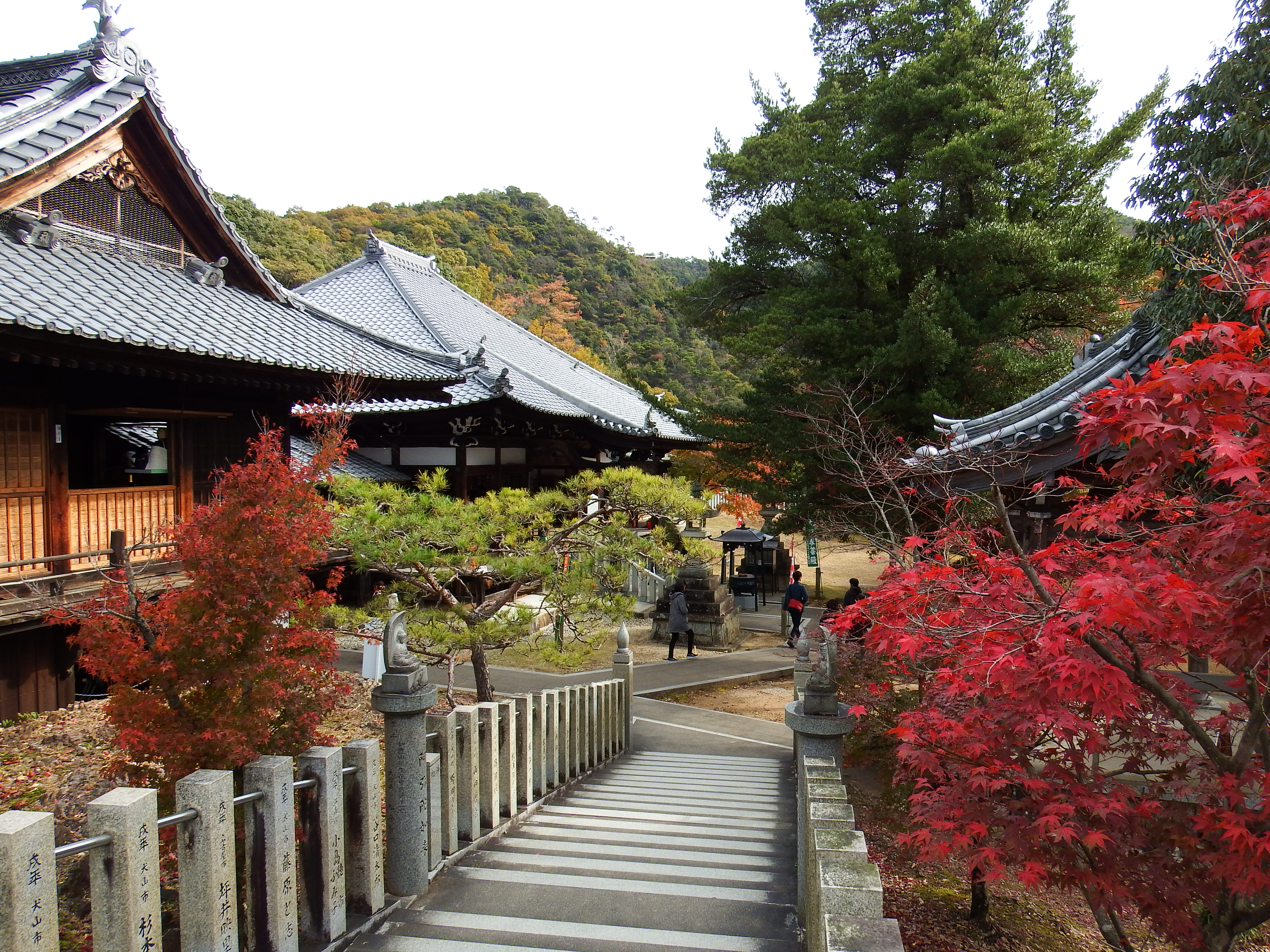
Jakkō-in

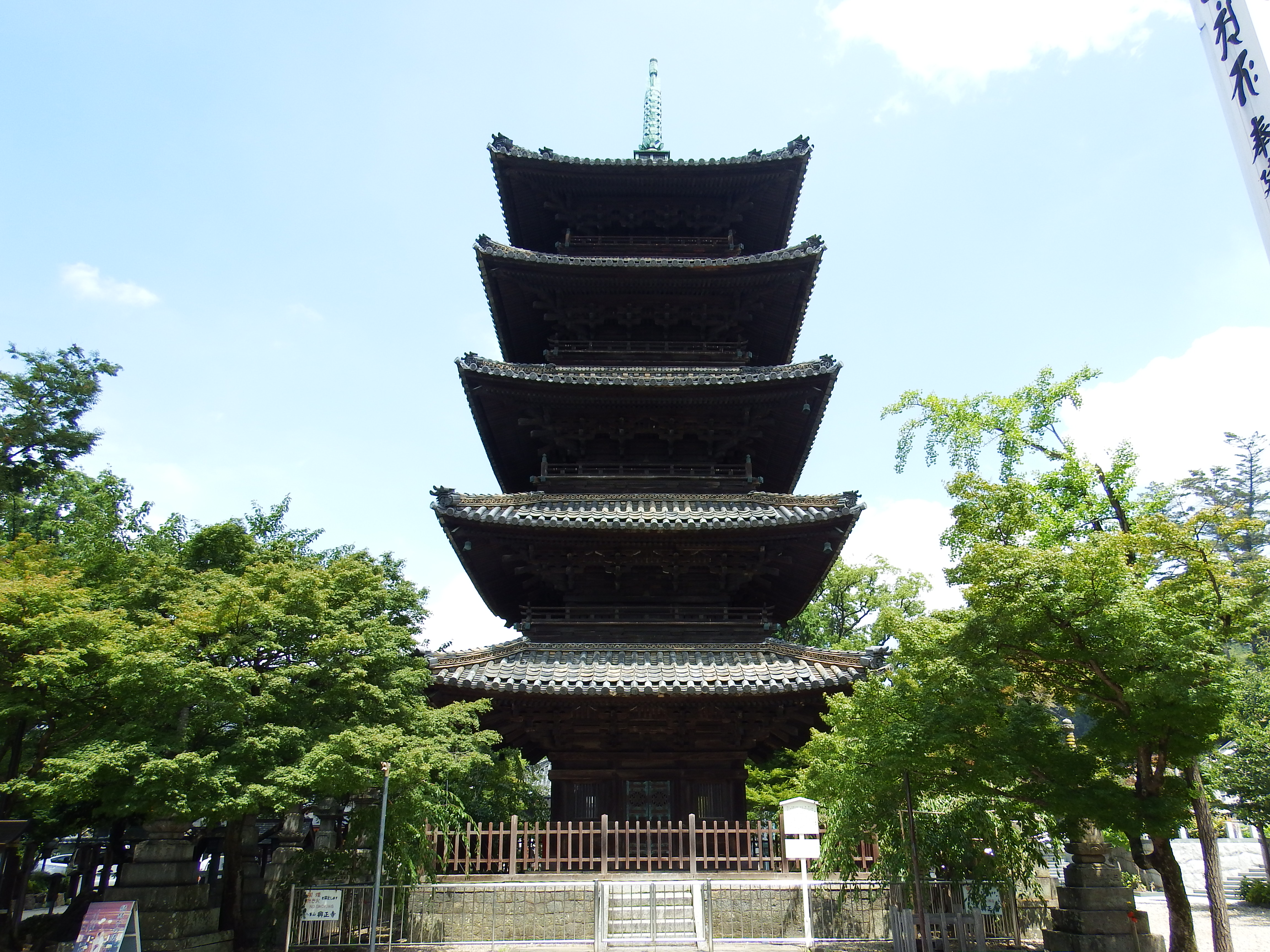
Kōshō-ji

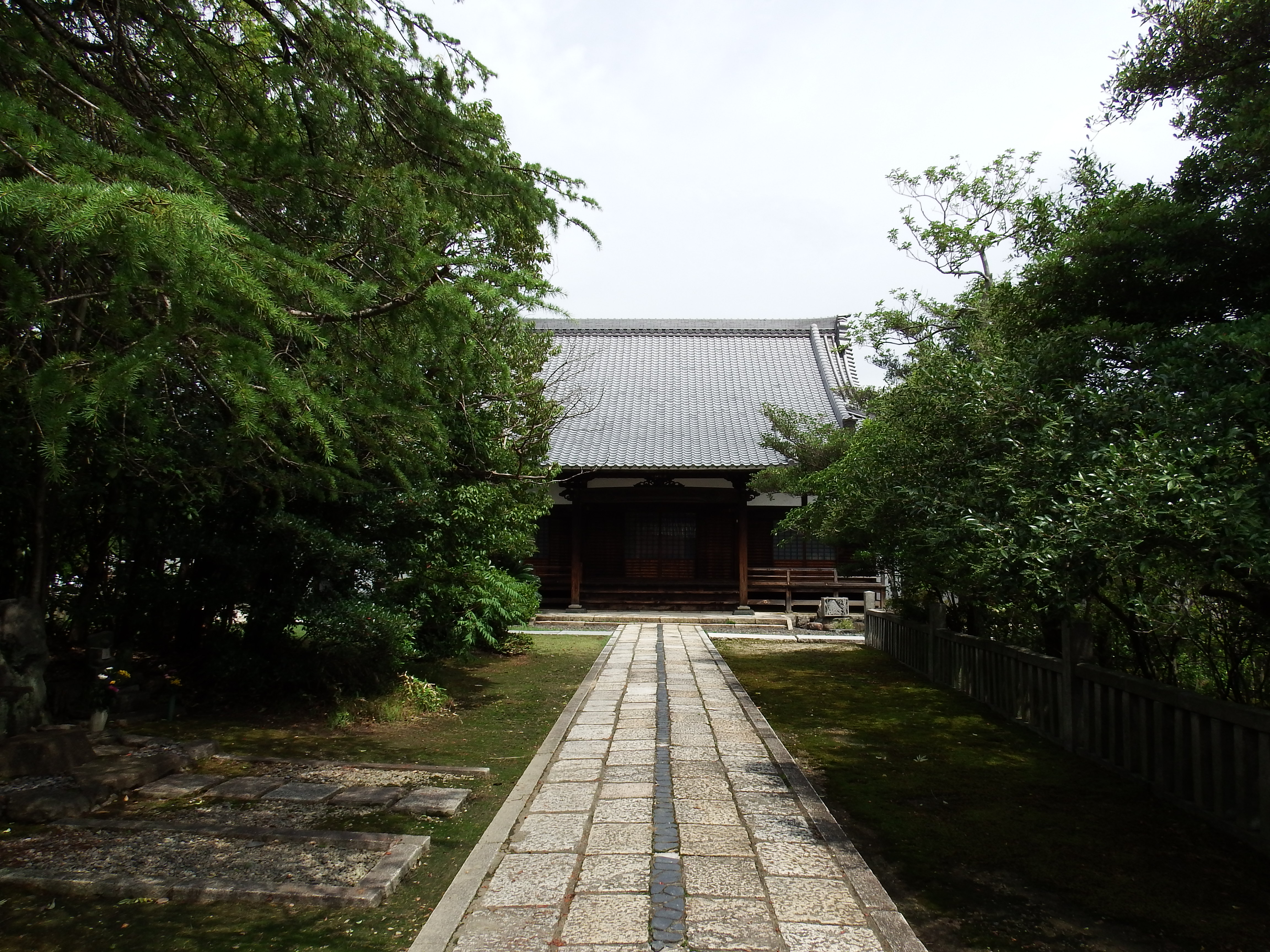
Chōbo-ji

The Owari Thirty-three Kannon (尾張三十三観音, Owari Sanjūsan Kannon) are a collection of Buddhist temples in western Aichi Prefecture, Japan, all dedicated to the bodhisattva Avalokitesvara (Kannon). The name is derived from Owari Province, the former name for the area. The list was created in 1955.

== Thirty-three Kannon ==
No.	Name	Japanese	Sangō	Sect	Location
1	Hōshō-in/Ōsu Kannon	宝生院	Kitano-san	Shingon	Nagoya
2	Chōei-ji	長栄寺	Kōshō-san	Sōtō	Nagoya
3	Ryūfuku-ji/Kasadera	笠覆寺	Tenrin-zan	Shingon	Nagoya
4	Chōraku-ji	長楽寺	Inari-san	Sōtō	Nagoya
5	Fumon-ji	普門寺		Sōtō	Ōbu
6	Tōun-in	洞雲院		Sōtō	Agui
7	Iwada-dera	岩屋寺	Daihi-san	Owaritakano-san	Minamichita
8	Ōmidō-ji	大御堂寺	Kakurin-zan	Shingon	Mihama
9	Sainen-ji	斉年寺		Sōtō	Tokoname
10	Daichi-in	大智院		Shingon	Chita
11	Kannon-ji	観音寺		Shingon	Tōkai
12	Kannon-ji	観音寺		Tendai	Nagoya
13	Ryūshō-in	龍照院		Shingon	Kanie
14	Daiji-in	大慈院		Sōtō	Yatomi
15	Kōsai-ji	広済寺		Sōtō	Shippō
16	Jimoku-ji	甚目寺		Shingon	Jimokuji
17	Mantoku-ji	萬徳寺		Shingon	Inazawa
18	Ryūtan-ji	龍潭寺		Sōtō	Iwakura
19	Keirin-ji	桂林寺		Sōtō	Ōguchi
20	Jakkō-in	寂光院	Tsugao-zan	Shingon	Inuyama
21	Komatsu-ji	小松寺		Shingon	Komaki
22	Tōshō-in	陶昌院		Sōtō	Komaki
23	Gyokurin-ji	玉林寺		Sōtō	Komaki
24	Ryūon-ji/Mama Kannon	龍音寺		Jōdo-shū	Komaki
25	Ryūsen-ji	龍泉寺	Shōtō-zan	Tendai	Nagoya
26	Hōsen-ji	宝泉寺		Sōtō	Seto
27	Keishō-in	慶昌院		Sōtō	Seto
28	Chōbo-ji	長母寺		Rinzai	Nagoya
29	Kyūkoku-ji	久国寺		Sōtō	Nagoya
30	Zenpuku-in	善福院		Shingon	Nagoya
31	Jufuku-in	聚福院		Sōtō	Nagakute
32	Butchi-in	仏地院		Sōtō	Nagoya
33	Kōshō-ji	興正寺		Shingon	Nagoya

== Tōkai Hundred Kannon ==
The Owari Thirty-three Kannon combine with the Mino Thirty-three Kannon in Gifu Prefecture, the Mikawa Thirty-three Kannon in eastern Aichi Prefecture and Toyokawa Inari to form the Tōkai Hundred Kannon.

== See also ==
- Glossary of Japanese Buddhism (for an explanation of terms concerning Japanese Buddhism)
