= Kasadera Kannon =

Buddhist temple in Nagoya, Japan

Coordinates: 35.0995°N 136.9367°E

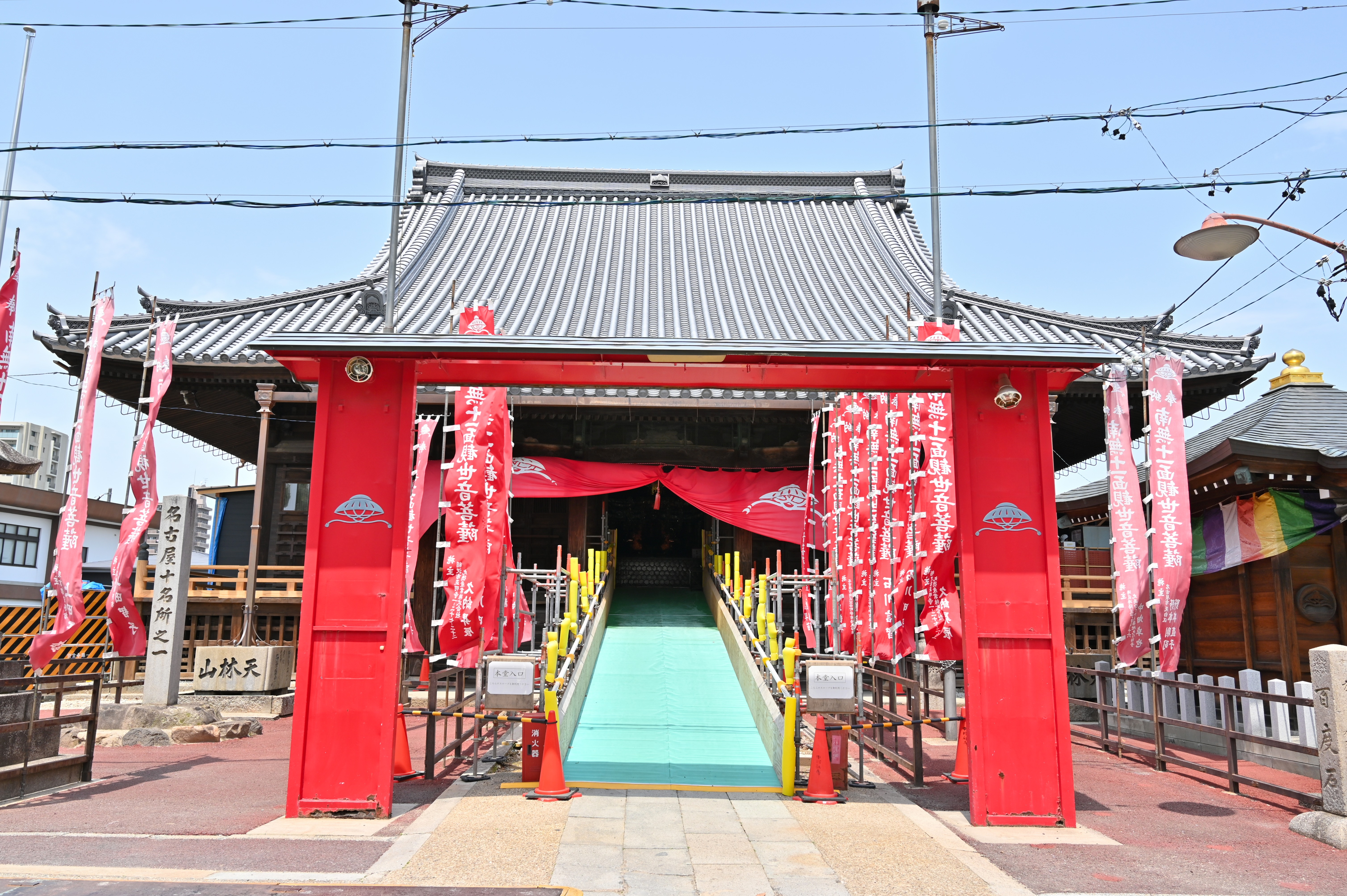
Kasadera Kannon in Nagoya

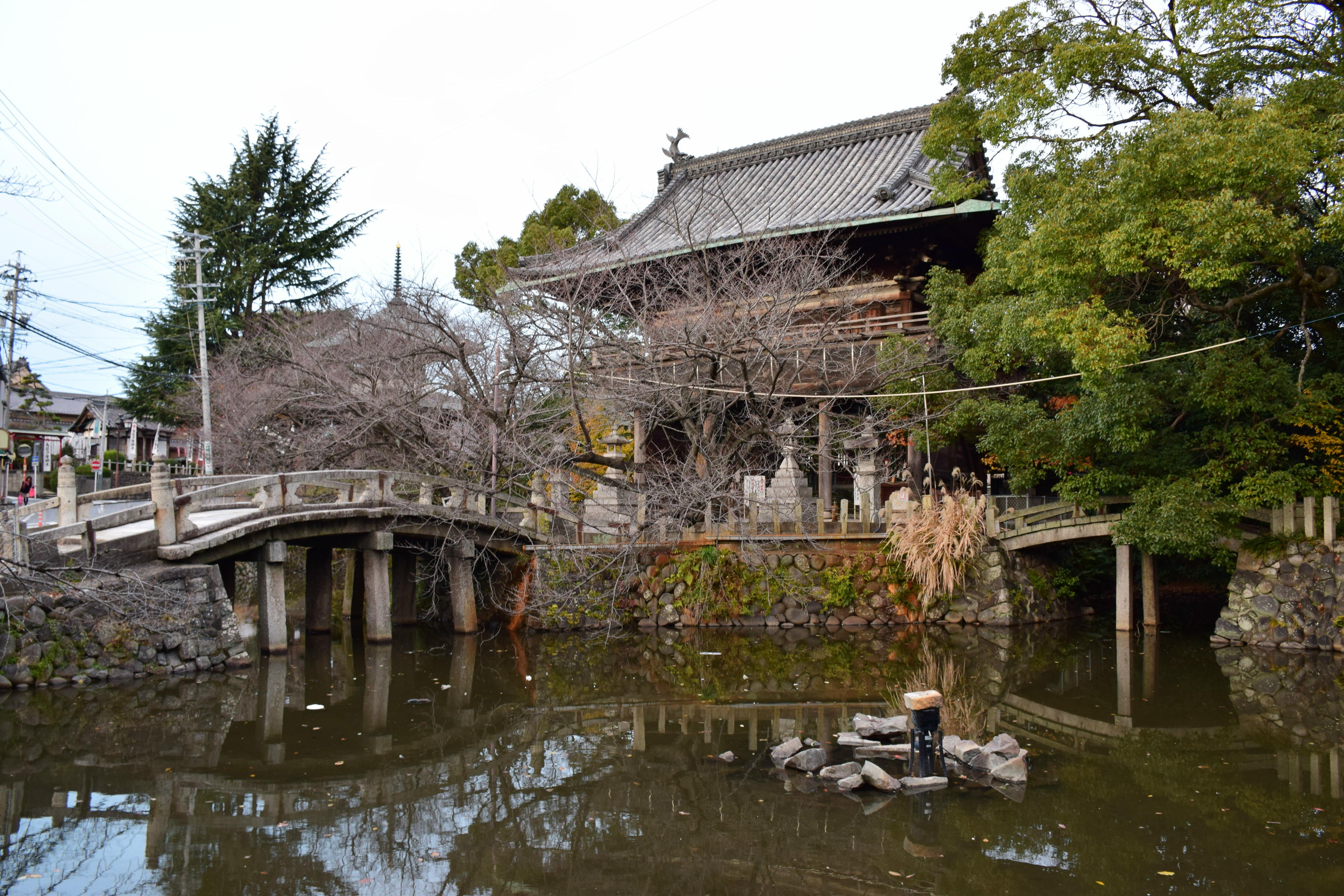
Sanmon

Kasadera Kannon, also known as Ryūfuku-ji (笠覆寺) is a Buddhist temple located in Minami-ku, Nagoya in central Japan.

It is a part of the Owari Thirty-three Kannon.

== History ==
The temple was established by the Shingon sect. The temple has a Niōmon entrance gate, a number of small subsidiary temples and a pagoda which is two storeys high. Kasadera Kannon stages a Spring-time Setsubun festival on February 3 each year and a temple flea market on the 18th of every month.

The closest stop by public transport is Moto-Kasadera Station with the Meitetsu Nagoya Main Line.
