= Gifu Gokoku Shrine =

Shinto shrine in Gifu Prefecture, Japan

Gifu Gokoku Shrine 岐阜護國神社
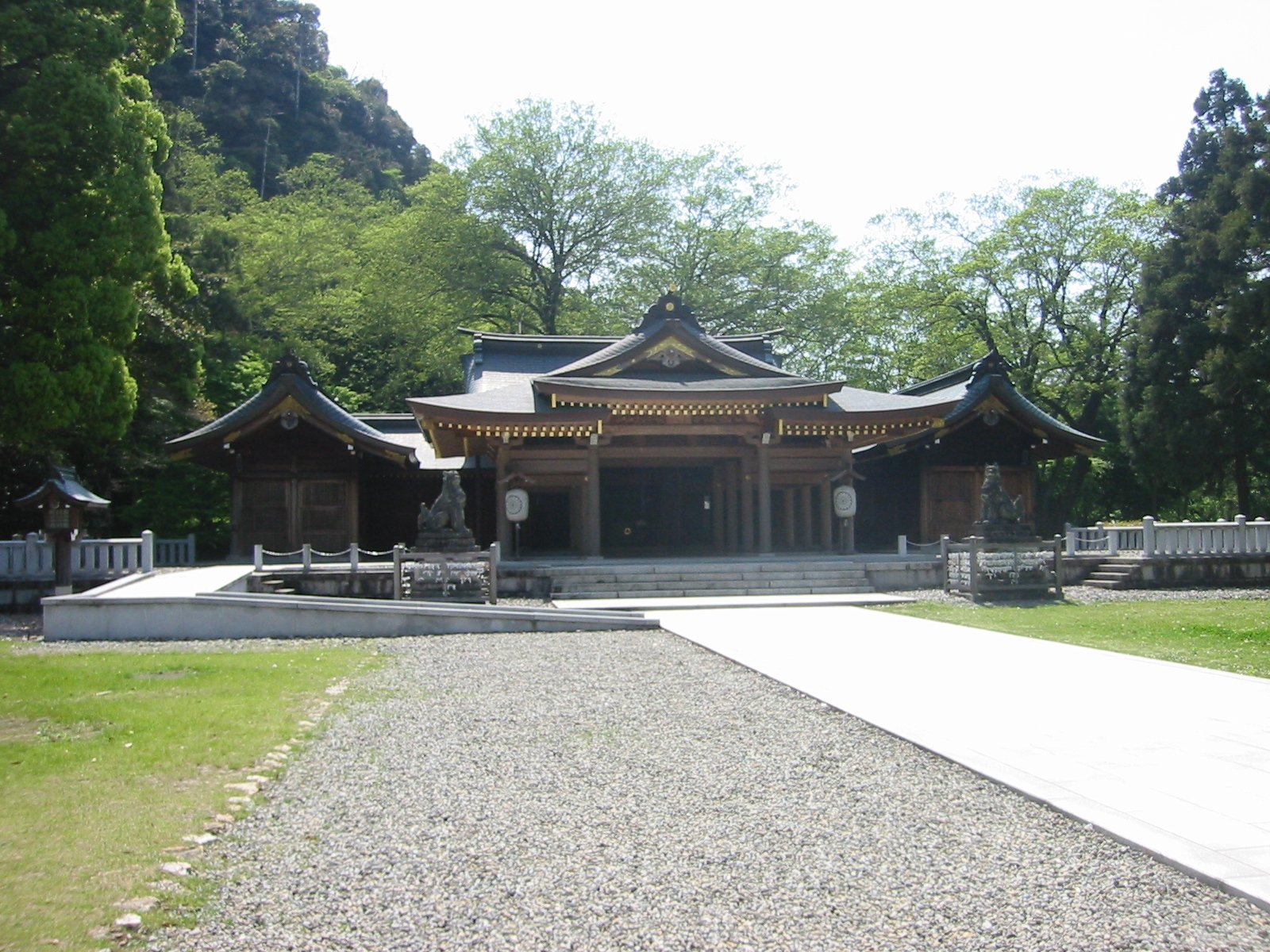
- Gifu Gokoku Shrine

- Location within Japan

Religion
- Affiliation: Shinto

Location
- Location: 393 Mitarashi, Gifu; Gifu Prefecture 〒500-8002; Japan
- Coordinates: 35°26′12.1″N 136°46′27.8″E

Architecture
- Established: 1940

Website
- www.gifu-gokoku.com

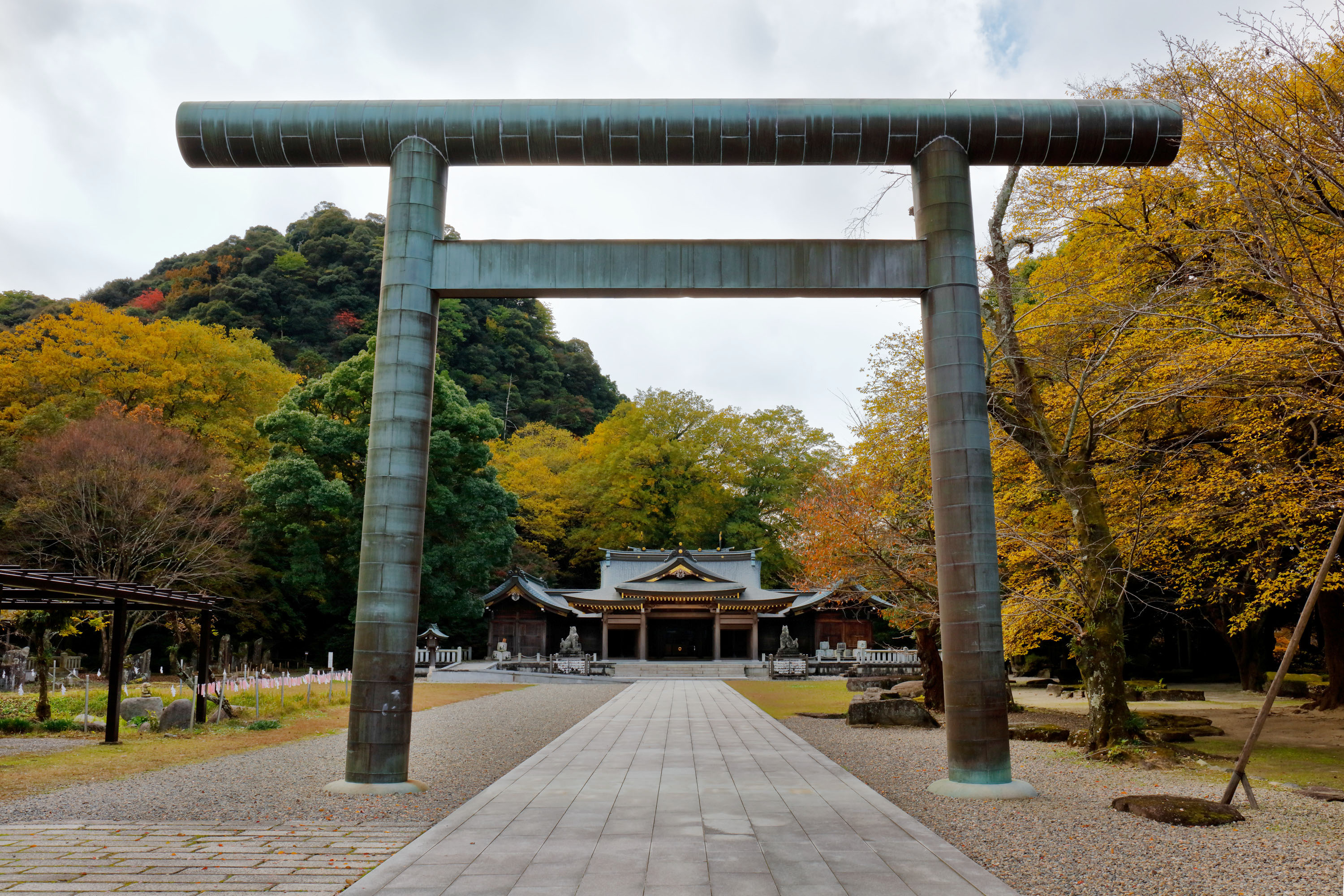
Main gate to Gifu Gokoku Shrine

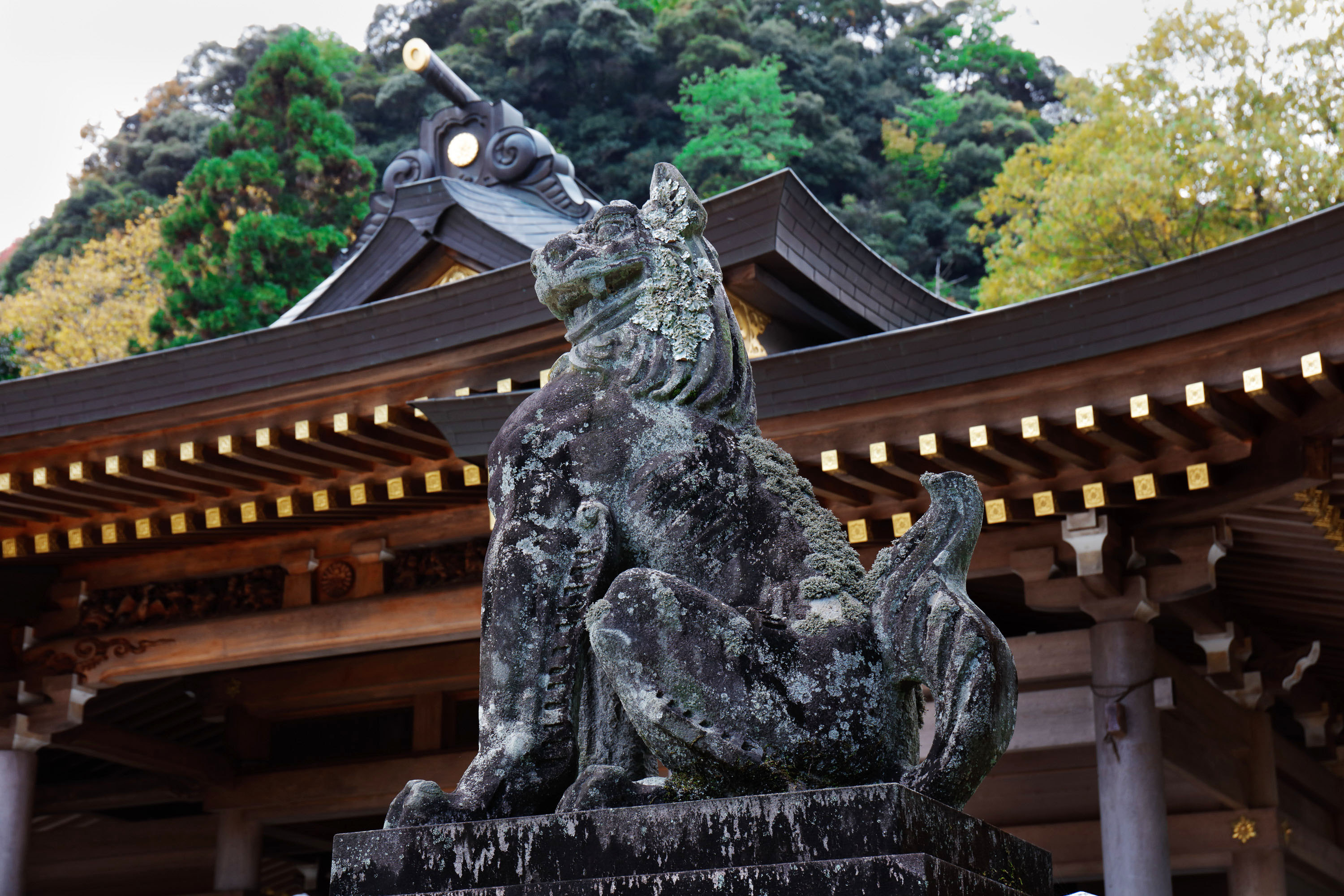
Lion of Buddha

Gifu Gokoku Shrine (岐阜護國神社, Gifu Gokoku Jinja) is a Shinto shrine located at the base of Mount Kinka in Gifu, Gifu Prefecture, Japan. The shrine is dedicated to the 37,000 residents of Gifu Prefecture who have died in wars since the Meiji Restoration. Official ceremonies are also held at the neighboring Hotel Seiran, which is part of the shrine facilities.

The shrine's two festivals are April 12 and October 5.

== History ==
During the first part of the Meiji period, there were two shrines in Gifu Prefecture dedicated to the war dead. In Ōgaki, there was the Ōgaki Shōkonsha (大垣招魂社), which was later renamed the Nōhi Gokoku Shrine. In Takayama, there was the Hida Shōkonsha (飛騨招魂社), which was later renamed the Hida Gokoku Shrine. These two shrines, however, only served their surrounding areas and there were many districts within the prefecture who did not have shrines dedicated to their war dead.

After the Russo-Japanese War ended in 1905, in order to rectify the situation, plans for construction of a new shrine began to come together.. Construction would not begin, however, until 1939, when permission was finally granted to build the shrine. It was completed in 1940, and named Gifu Gokoku Shrine. After World War II, the shrine was renamed Mino Mitama Shrine (美濃御霊神社 Mino Mitama Jinja), but the shrine was later reverted to its original name.

== Cherry blossoms ==
Gifu Gokoku Shrine is well known for its cherry blossoms (sakura) in the spring. Its ukai-zakura (鵜飼桜) is among the earliest bloomers in the city and was planted over 100 years ago. The tree trunk's circumference is about 2.5 metres (8.2 ft) and the tree is about 8 metres (26.2 ft) tall. The cherry trees received their names because it is said that their blossoms can indicate the amount of ayu caught during the upcoming cormorant fishing (ukai) season.

== See also ==
- Nōhi Gokoku Shrine
- Hida Gokoku Shrine

== Images ==
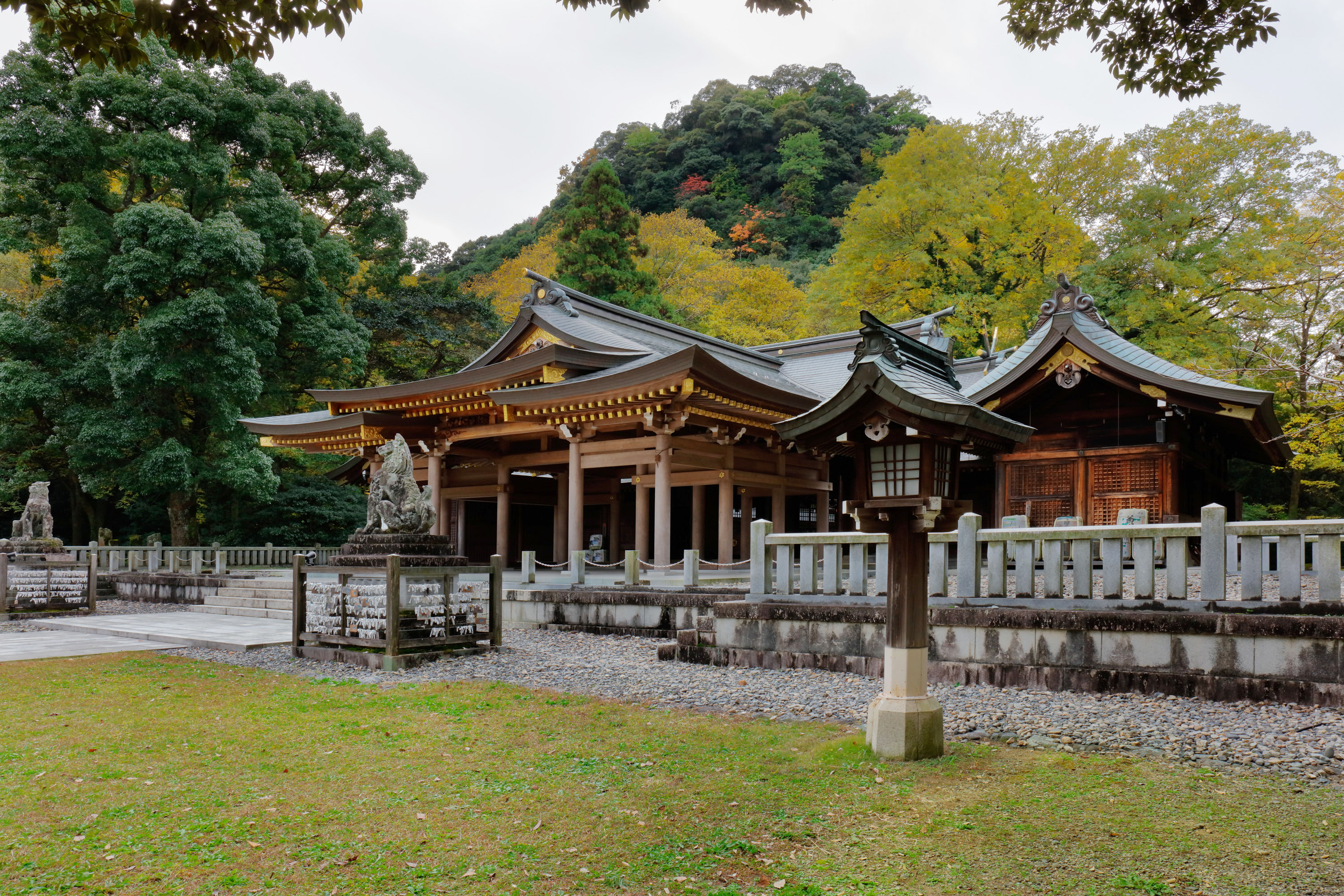

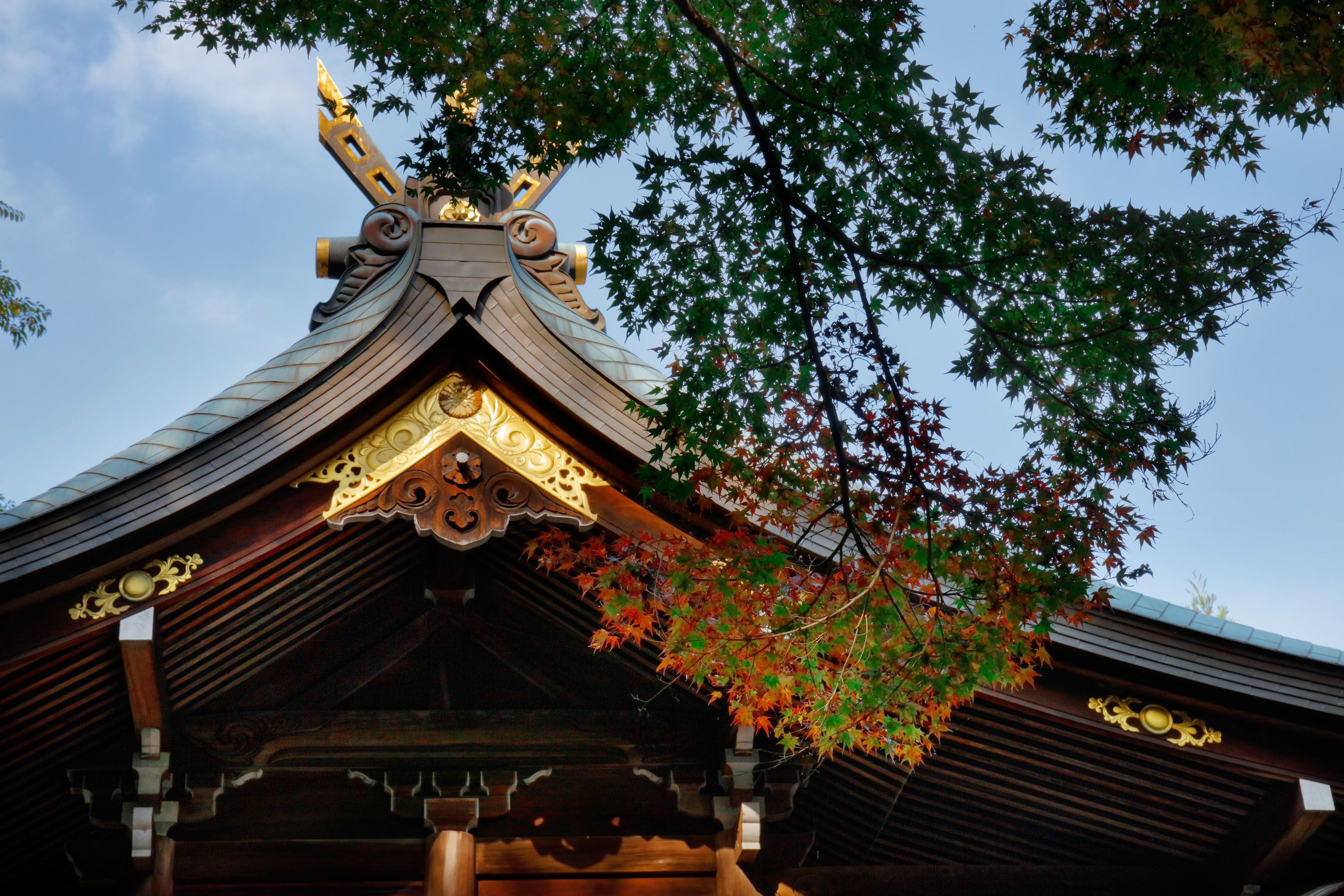

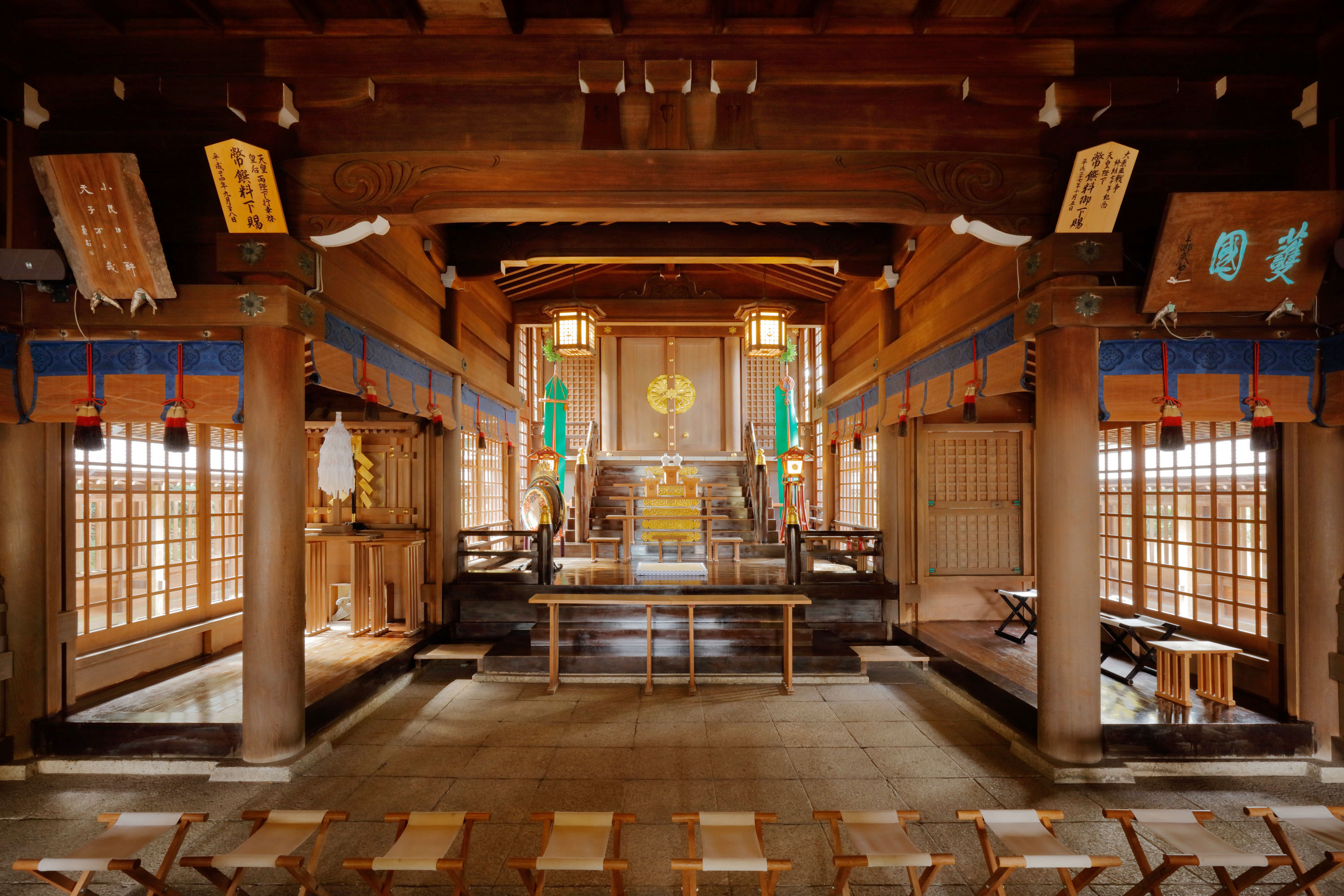

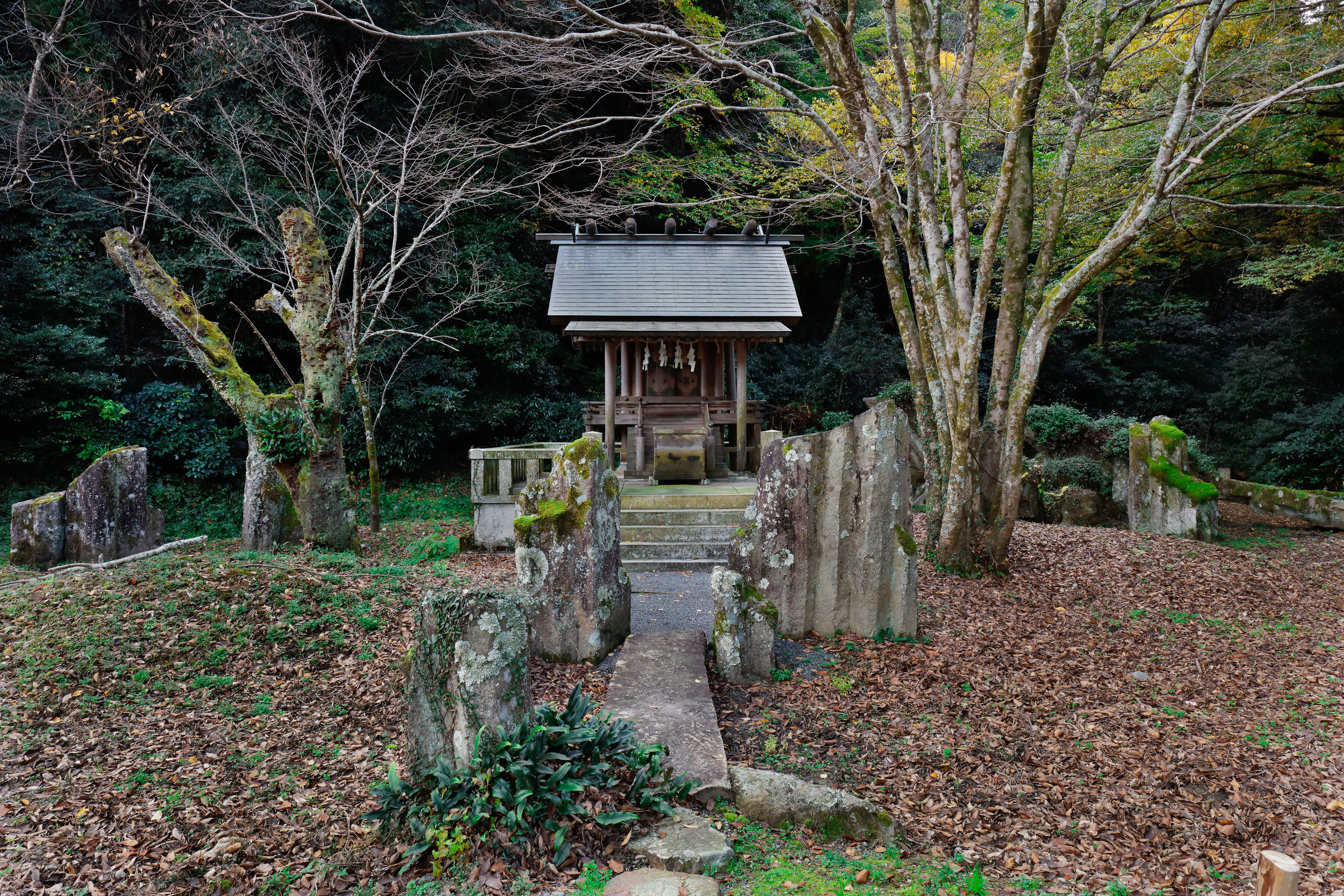

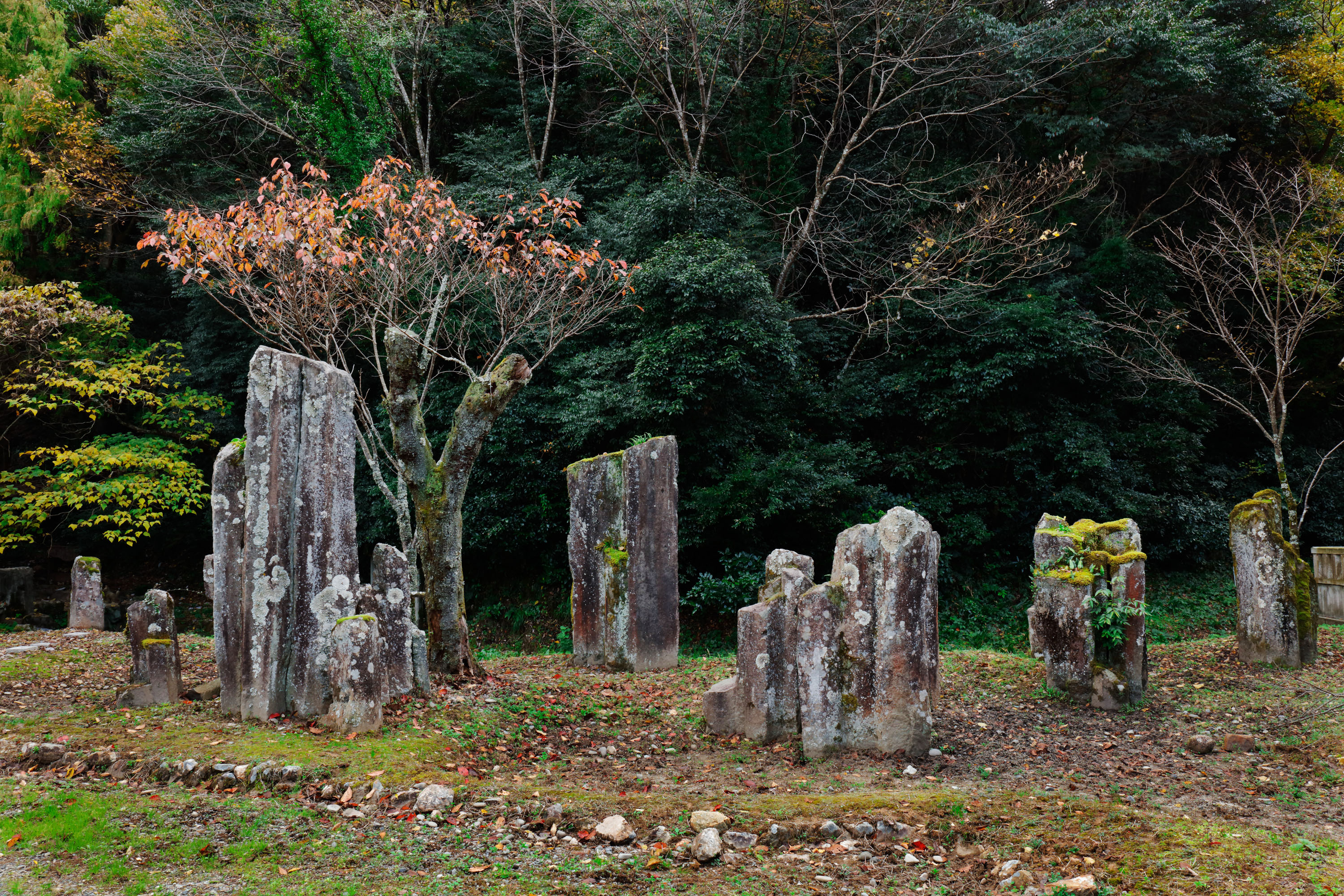

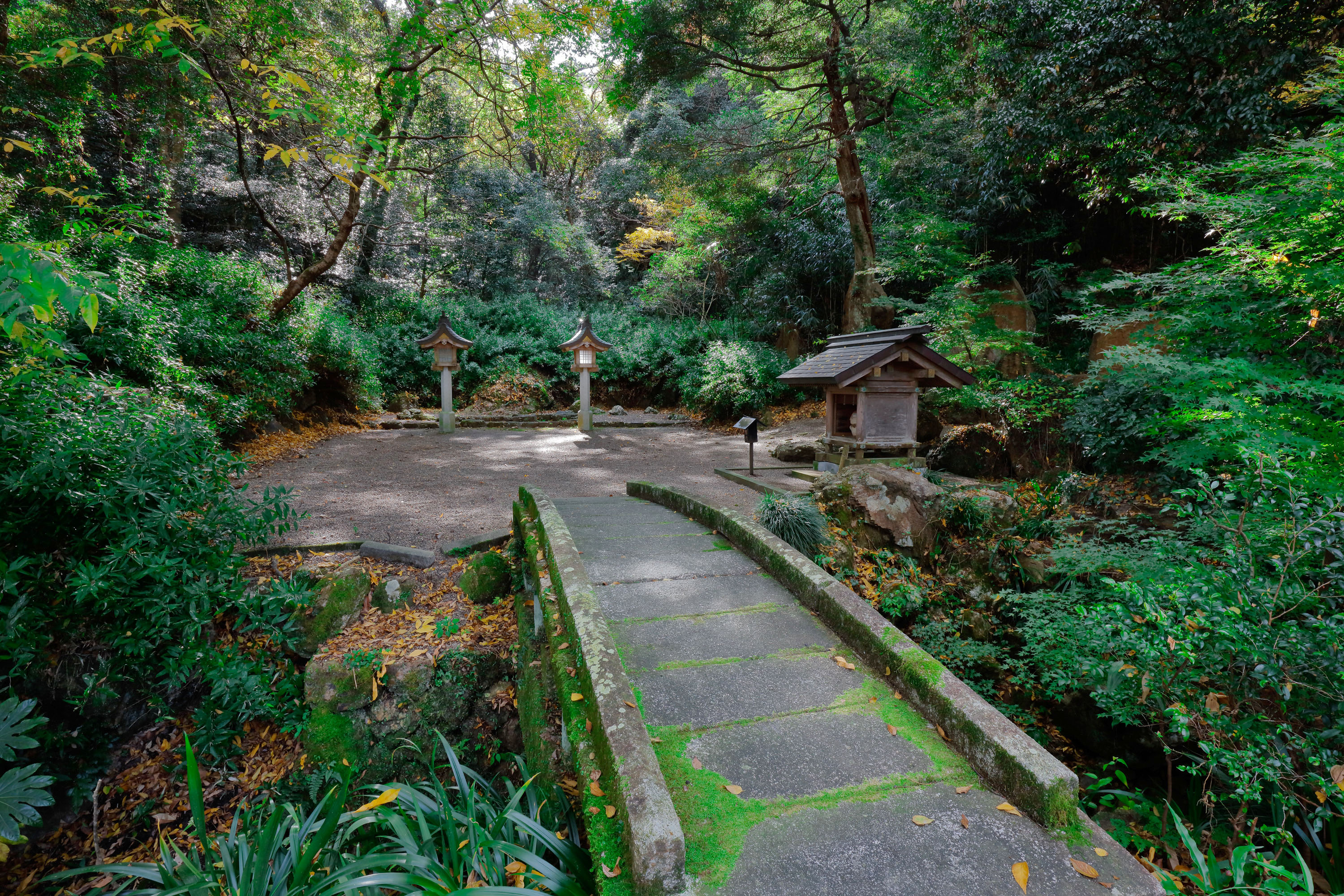

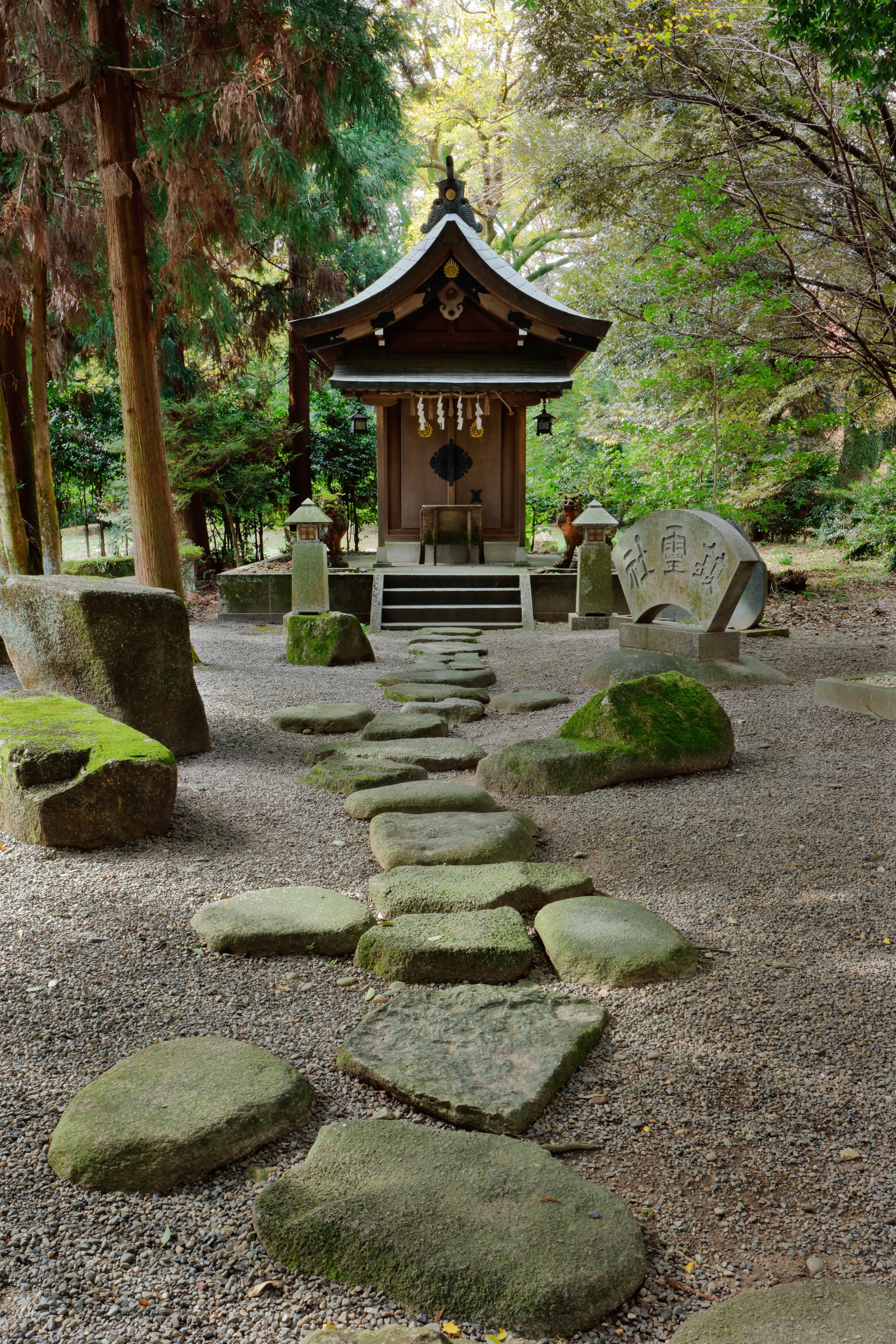

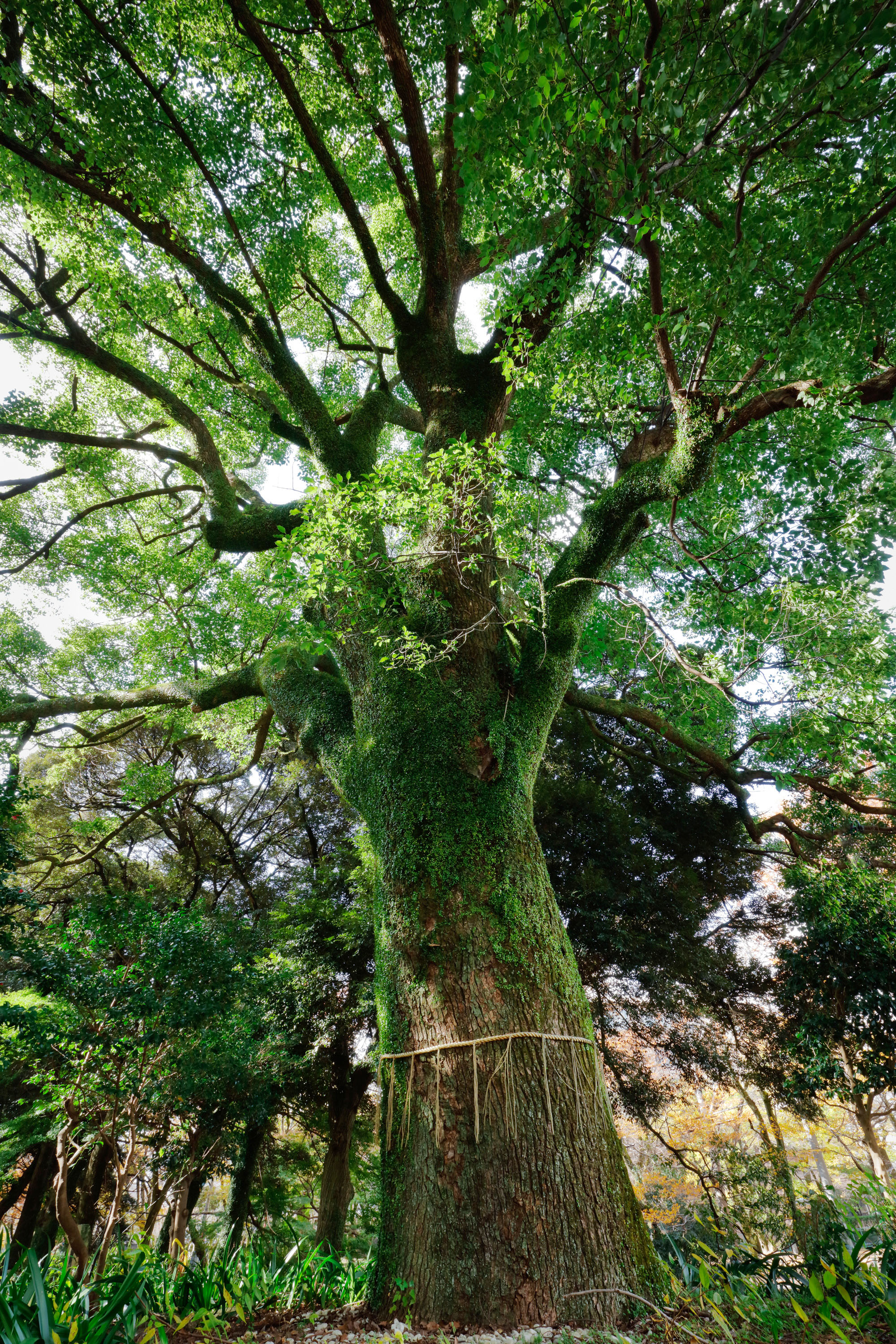
