= Mieji-juku =

Pre-modern Japan post-station along highway

Mieji-juku 美江寺宿
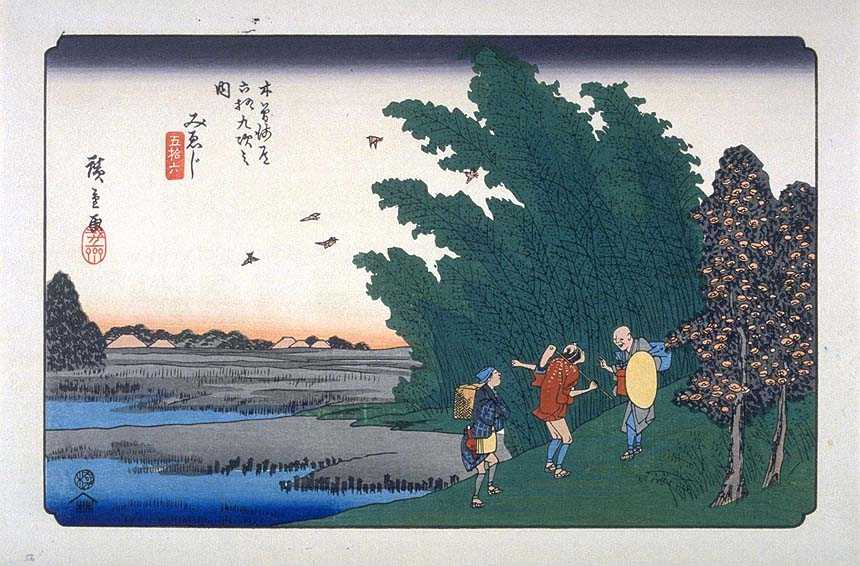
- Hiroshige's print of Mieji-juku, part of the Sixty-nine Stations of the Kiso Kaidō series

General information
- Location: Mizuho, Gifu (former Mino Province); Japan
- Coordinates: 35°24′36.0″N 136°39′23.0″E
- Elevation: 10 m (33 ft)
- System: post station
- Line: Nakasendō
- Distance: 423.4 km from Edo
Location
- Location within Gifu Prefecture Location within Japan

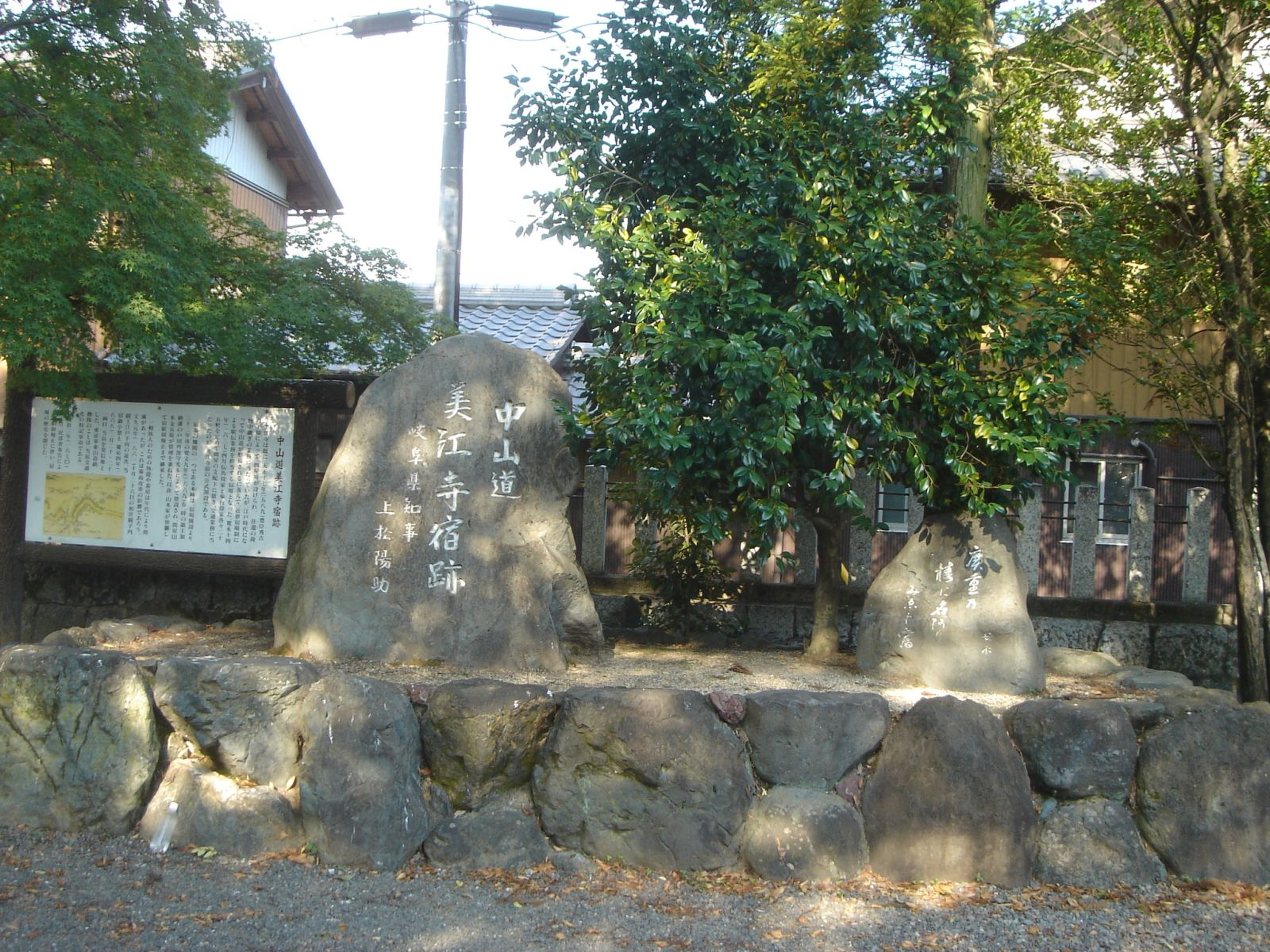
Stone marker where Mieji-juku was located

Mieji-juku (美江寺宿, Mieji-juku) was the fifty-fifth of the sixty-nine stations of the Nakasendō connecting Edo with Kyoto in Edo period Japan. It is located in former Mino Province in what is now part of the city of Mizuho, Gifu Prefecture, Japan.

== History ==
Mieji is surrounded by the Kiso Three Rivers: the Kiso River, Ibi River and the Nagara River and was subject to frequent flooding. A Buddhist temple called Mie-ji was constructed in 717 AD with an image of Kannon Bosatsu to pray for protection against floods, and a small village grew up around the gates of the temple. However, during the Sengoku period, Saitō Dōsan relocated the temple to his capital at Gifu. A small chapel was rebuilt, and under Toyotomi Hideyoshi a tonya was established for the supply of porters, horses and the warehousing of goods. However, it was not until 1637 that the Tokugawa shogunate officially formalized Mieji as a post station on the Nakasendō and it was not until 1669 that the honjin was completed.

Per the 1843 "中山道宿村大概帳" (Nakasendō Shukuson Taigaichō) guidebook issued by the Inspector of Highways (道中奉行, Dōchu-būgyō), the town had a population of 582 people in 136 houses, including one honjin, and 11 hatago.

The station had a bad reputation, as travelers could be trapped for days due the floods (during which time prices increased astronomically). The honjin had an elevation of only 10 meters above sea level, and was the highest point in the settlement. The eleven inns were of low standing, and were known to be frequented by thieves. Mieji was also known for the aggressiveness of its meshimori onna serving girls, who supplemented their income as prostitutes. However, the station also promoted its location on the Mino Thirty-three Kannon pilgrimage routes and was frequented by many pilgrims.

== Mieji-juku in The Sixty-nine Stations of the Kiso Kaidō ==
Utagawa Hiroshige's ukiyo-e print of Mieji-juku dates from 1835 -1838. The print depicts a placid view of Mieji, with two farmers stopping to give directions to a traveling priest. The thatched roofs of the post station can be seen beyond a marsh with groves of bamboo and a pair of blooming Camilla trees.

== Surrounding Area ==
The Goroku River, which ran alongside Mieji-juku, received its name from the post town. "Goroku" (五六) means "56." (Mieji-juku was the 56th stop along the Nakasendō if Nihonbashi is included.)

== Neighboring Post Towns ==
Nakasendō
Gōdo-juku - Mieji-juku - Akasaka-juku
