= Hida Gokoku Shrine =

Shinto shrine in Takayama, Gifu prefecture, Japan

Hida Gokoku Shrine 飛騨護國神社
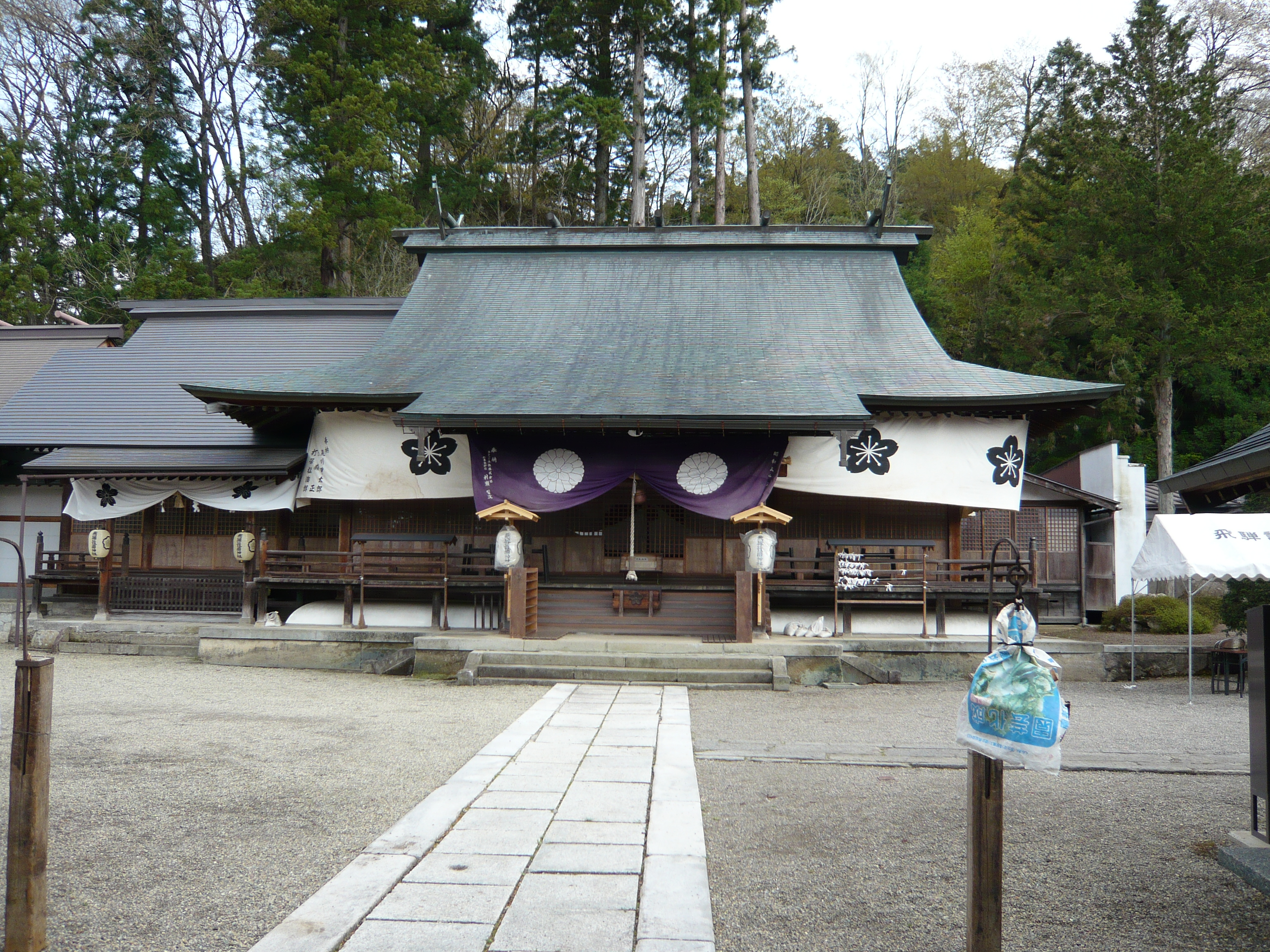
- Hida Gokoku Shrine's haiden

- Location within Japan

Religion
- Affiliation: Shinto

Location
- Location: 90 Horibata-machi, Takayama; Gifu Prefecture; Japan
- Coordinates: 36°8′27.14″N 137°15′47.44″E

Architecture
- Established: 1909

Hida Gokoku Shrine (飛騨護國神社, Hida Gokoku Jinja) is a Shinto shrine located in Takayama, Gifu Prefecture, Japan. The shrine is designated to the people from the area who died during wars. The time period represented by the dead ranges from the Satsuma Rebellion in 1877 to World War II. Because it represented only a small portion of the prefecture, it was eventually replaced by the Gifu Gokoku Shrine.

== History ==
The shrine was originally named Hida Shōkonsha (飛騨招魂社).

In 1940, the Gifu Gokoku Shrine was completed and began to represent the war dead for the entire prefecture.

The shrine's festival days are May 2–3 and November 4–5.

== See also ==
- Gifu Gokoku Shrine
- Nōhi Gokoku Shrine
