= Gōdo-juku =

Pre-modern Japan post-station along highway

Gōdo-juku 河渡宿
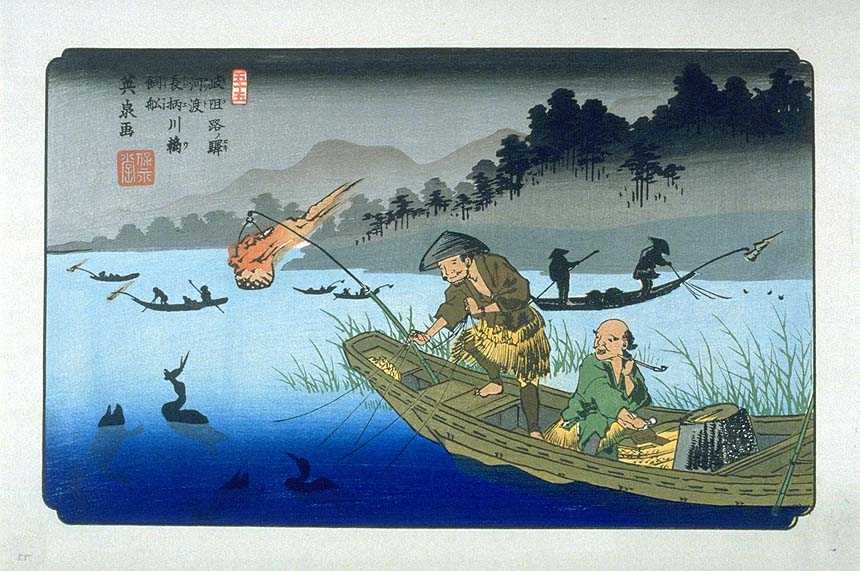
- Hiroshige's print of Gōdo-juku, part of the Sixty-nine Stations of the Kiso Kaidō series

General information
- Location: Gifu, Gifu Prefecture (former Mino Province); Japan
- Coordinates: 35°24′29.0″N 136°42′00.0″E
- Elevation: 126 m (413 ft)
- System: post station
- Line: Nakasendō
- Distance: 418.7 km from Edo
Location
- Location within Gifu Prefecture Location within Japan

Gōdo-juku (河渡宿, Gōdo-juku) was the fifty-fourth of the sixty-nine stations of the Nakasendō connecting Edo with Kyoto in Edo period Japan. It is located in former Mino Province in what is now part of the city of Gifu, Gifu Prefecture, Japan.

== History ==
Gōdo-juku was located on the far bank of the Nagara River from the castle town of Gifu and was the site of a ferry landing. Under the Tokugawa shogunate, no bridges were constructed across the Nagara River for defensive purposes, and all travelers, whether traveling merchants, priests, or daimyō on sankin-kōtai to-and-from the Shogun's court in Edo were required to cross by boat.

Per the 1843 "中山道宿村大概帳" (Nakasendō Shukuson Taigaichō) guidebook issued by the Inspector of Highways (道中奉行, Dōchu-būgyō), the post station was one of the smallest on the highway and had a population of 272 people in 64 houses, including one honjin, and 24 hatago, mostly used by travellers who missed the last ferry. It was located 418.7 kilometers from Edo.

Gōdo-juku was completely leveled in the Bombing of Gifu in World War II, and no structures of the former post station have survived. A small Kannon-do shrine has been reconstructed near the former ferry landing.

== Gōdo-juku in The Sixty-nine Stations of the Kiso Kaidō ==
Utagawa Hiroshige's ukiyo-e print of Gōdo-juku dates from 1835 -1838 and is formally named "Gifu Road Station: Godo, Nagara River Cormorant Fishing Boat" (岐阻路ノ駅 河渡 長柄川鵜飼船 Gifu no Michi no Eki: Gōdo, Nagaragawa Ukaibune). As the name implies, the scene depicted is that of Cormorant fishing on the Nagara River, which is still a popular tourist attraction in Gifu. The post station itself is not depicted.

== Gōdo-juku Festival ==
On the last Sunday of October, the Nakasendō Gōdo-juku Committee organizes a Gōdo-juku Festival, with the support of other sponsors. The festival offers hands-on experiences and teaches about the Edo period post station.

== Neighboring post towns ==
Nakasendō
Kanō-juku - Gōdo-juku - Mieji-juku
