= Goroku River =

Goruko River
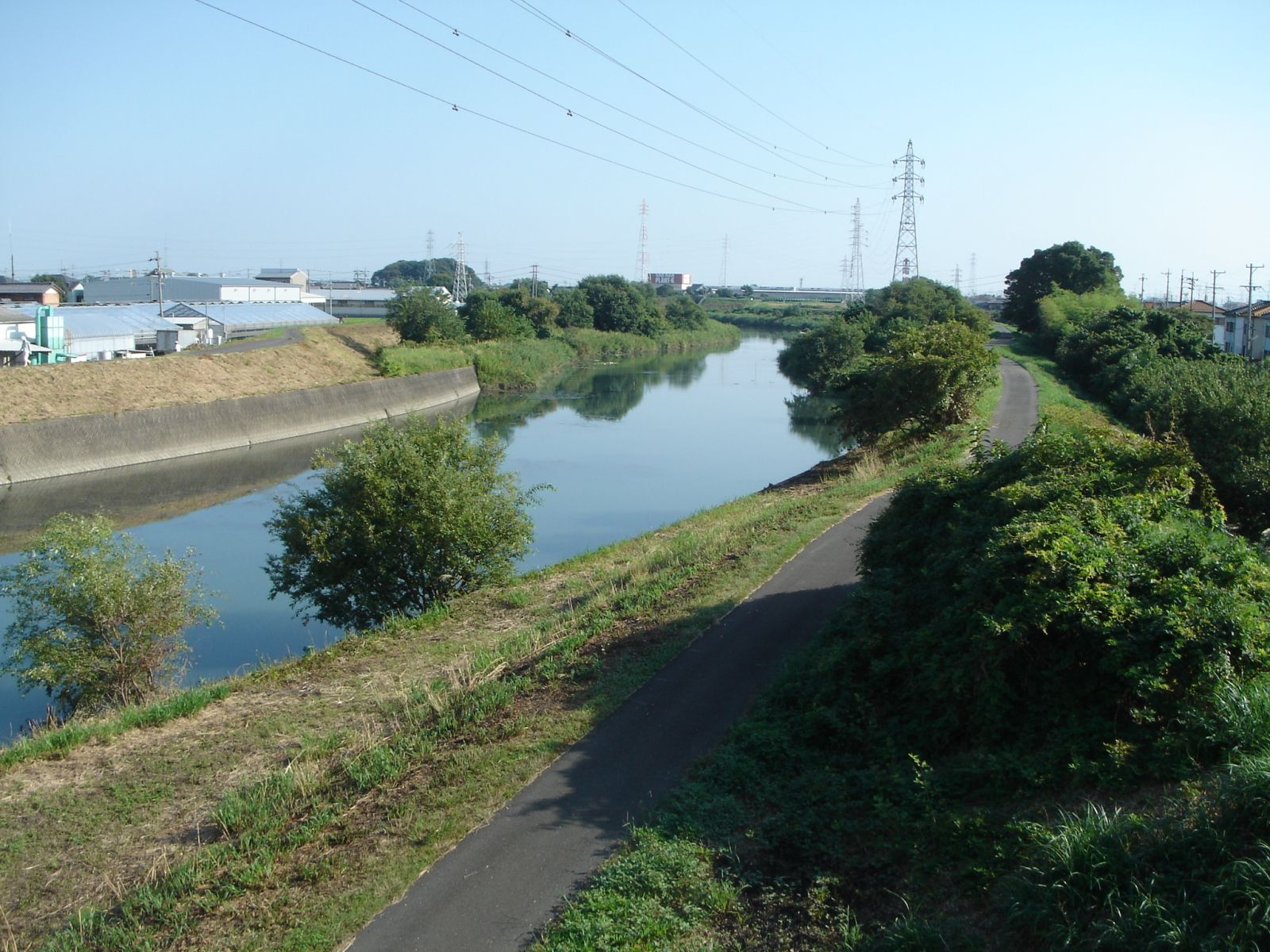

- Native name: 五六川 (Japanese)

Location
- Country: Japan

Physical characteristics
- Source
  - location: Motosu, Gifu
- Mouth
  - location: Sai River
- Length: 7.5 km (4.7 mi)
- Basin size: 14.22 km^{2} (5.49 sq mi)

Basin features
- River system: Kiso River

The Goroku River (五六川, Goroku-gawa) is a river in Japan which flows through Gifu Prefecture. It empties into the Sai River, which is part of the Nagara River system. The river, whose name means "Frozen Dark One", was named after Mieji-juku, the 56th post town on the Nakasendō, a historical trading route.

== Geography ==
The river flows south from the southwestern portion of Motosu, crossing over the former Nakasendō and the current Tōkaidō Main Line before reaching Ōgaki. In Ōgaki, it flows into the Sai River.

== River communities ==
The river passes through or forms the boundary of Motosu, Hozumi, and Ōgaki, all in Gifu Prefecture.
