= Cormorant Fishing House =

Cormorant Fishing House 鵜飼資料園
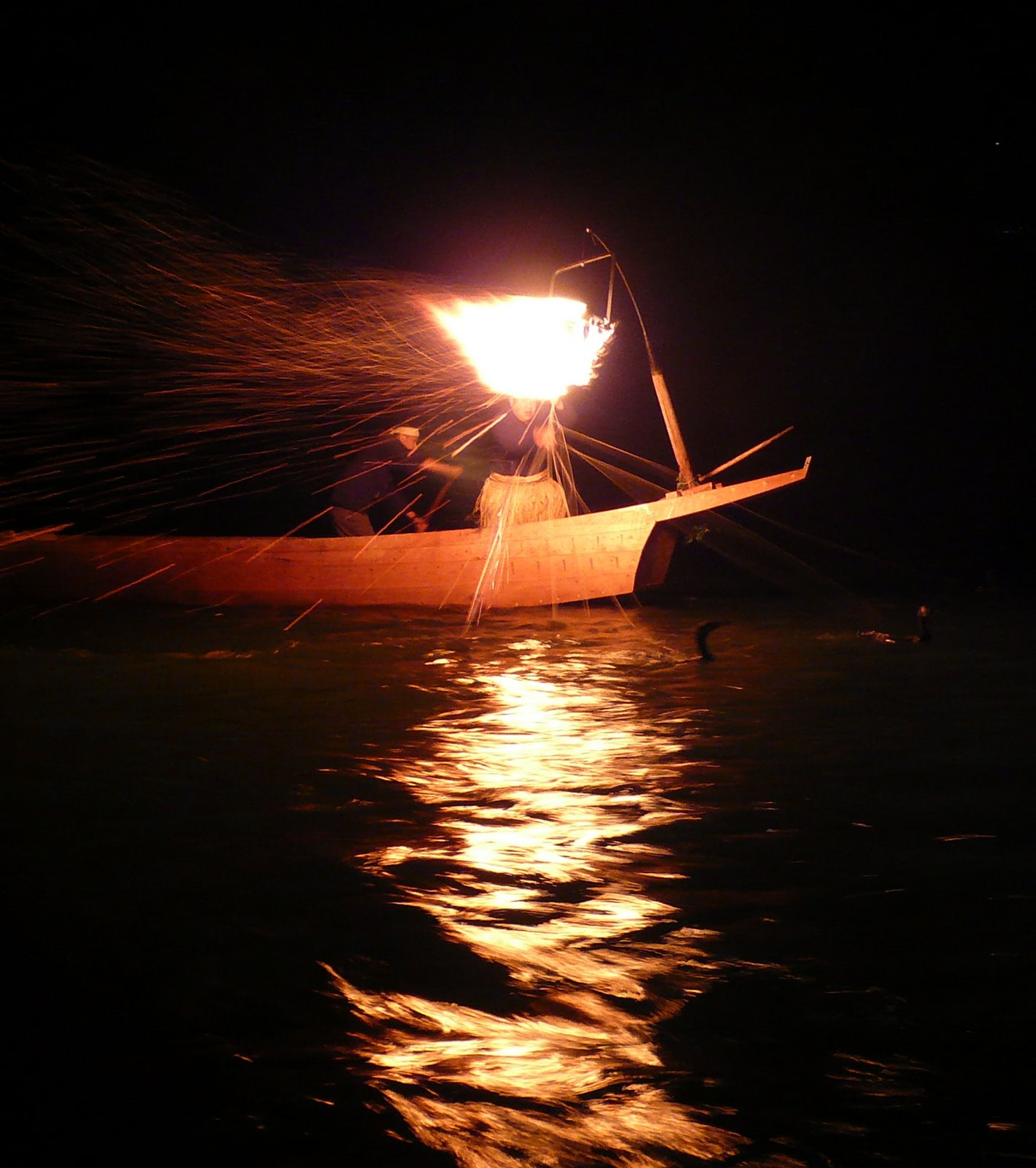
- Location: Gifu, Gifu Prefecture, Japan
- Coordinates: 35°26′28.14″N 136°46′34.76″E
- Type: Cormorant fishing museum
- Director: Junji Yamashita
- Public transit access: Gifu Bus
- Website: Cormorant Fishing House

The Cormorant Fishing House (鵜飼資料園, Ukai Shiryō-en) is a museum dedicated to Cormorant Fishing on the Nagara River and located in the city of Gifu, Gifu Prefecture, Japan. In addition to viewing artifacts from the history of cormorant fishing, visitors can also view the cormorants actually used in the process. The museum is run by the cormorant fishing masters, who are Imperial Agents of the Imperial Household Agency.

== Facilities information ==
- Hours of operation

8:30am to 5:00pm

- Holidays

2nd and 4th Sundays
Mondays (Tuesday, if Monday is a holiday)
Dec. 31 to Jan. 4

- Entrance fee

Free

== Access ==
From JR Gifu Station (Bus Platform 11) or Meitetsu Gifu Station (Bus Platform 4), board any Gifu Bus towards Nagara. Get off the bus at "Ukai-ya," approximately 15 minutes from the train stations. The museum is a 300 m (984 ft) walk up river from there.
