= Nōhi Gokoku Shrine =

Shinto shrine in Gifu Prefecture, Japan

Nōhi Gokoku Shrine 濃飛護國神社
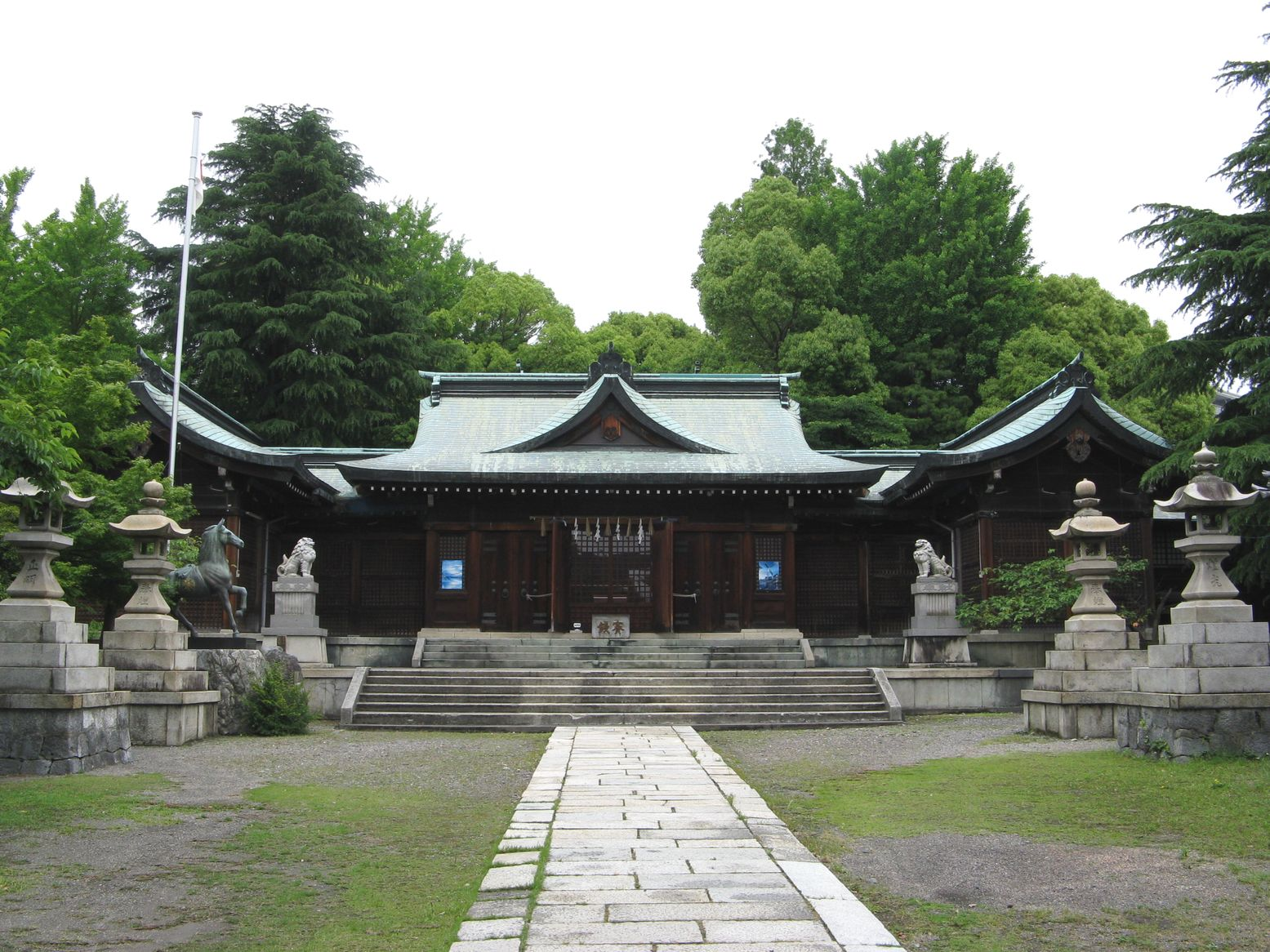

- Location within Japan

Religion
- Affiliation: Shinto

Location
- Location: 2-55 Kuruwa-machi, Ōgaki; Gifu Prefecture; Japan
- Interactive map of Nōhi Gokoku Shrine 濃飛護國神社
- Coordinates: 35°21′40.27″N 136°36′57.44″E

Architecture
- Established: 1871

Nōhi Gokoku Shrine (濃飛護國神社, Nōhi Gokoku Jinja) is a Shinto shrine located in Ōgaki, Gifu Prefecture, Japan. It is located near the base of Ōgaki Castle.

== War dead shrine ==
The shrine is designated to the approximately 19,000 people from the Seino and Hida regions of Gifu Prefecture who died during wars. Because it represented only a small portion of the prefecture, it was eventually replaced by the Gifu Gokoku Shrine.

== History ==
The shrine was originally built in 1871 to honor the 54 men from the area who had died during the Boshin War. Originally, it was called Ōgaki Shōkonsha (大垣招魂社). The shrine was replaced by the Gifu Gokoku Shrine in nearby Gifu after it was completed in 1940.

The shrine's two festival days are April 23 and September 22.

== See also ==
- Gifu Gokoku Shrine
- Hida Gokoku Shrine
