= Cormorant fishing on the Nagara River =

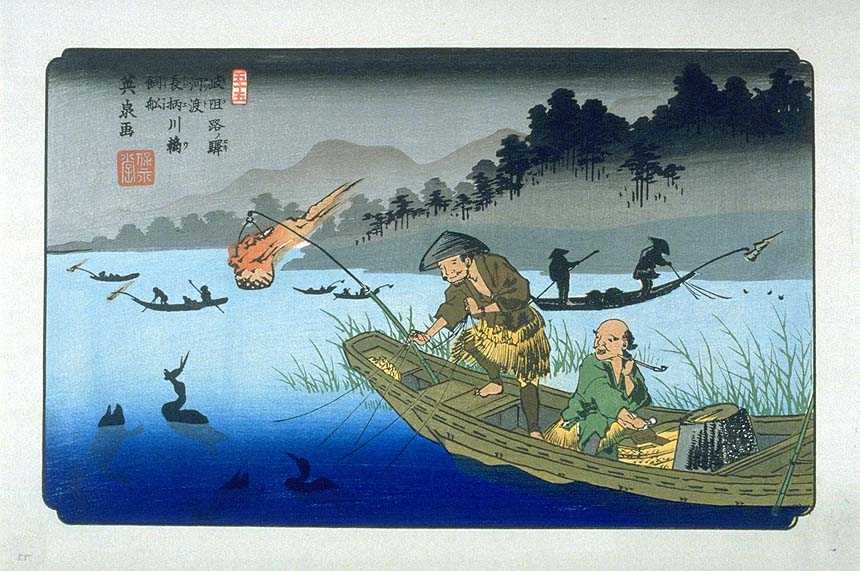
Keisai Eisen's print of Gōdo-juku, part of the series The Sixty-nine Stations of the Kiso Kaidō

Cormorant fishing on the Nagara River (ぎふ長良川の鵜飼, Gifu Nagaragawa no Ukai) has played a vital role in the history of the city of Gifu, Gifu Prefecture, Japan. Throughout its long history, it evolved from a means to live, to a profitable industry, to a major tourist draw. It runs from May 11 to October 15 of each year (except when the river level is high and during the harvest moon).

== History ==
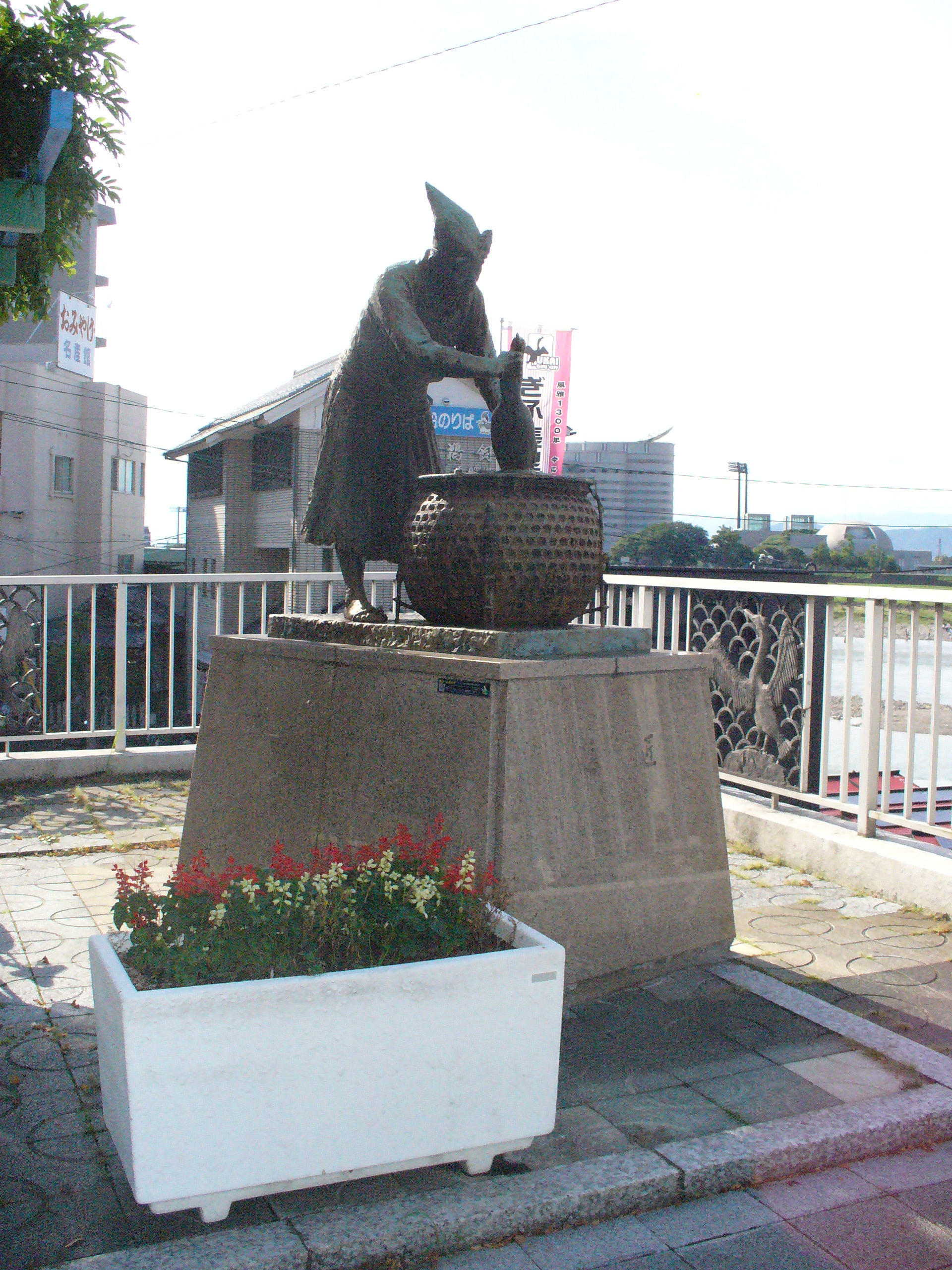
A bronze statue of a fishing master controlling his comorant, located near the Cormorant Fishing Viewing Boat Office

Cormorant fishing on the Nagara River is a 1,300-year-old tradition where fishing masters (鵜匠 ushō) use Japanese cormorants to catch fish, primarily ayu (sweetfish). Because of the great skills of the fishing masters, they have received the official title of "Cormorant Fishermen of the Imperial Household Agency", a hereditary title that is passed on from father to son. It takes ten years even at least to become a cormorant fishing master.

The use of cormorants for fishing on the Nagara River began over 1,300 years ago, originating as a way for people to feed their families. When cormorant fishing came under the auspices of the Imperial Household Agency, the first fish caught each year were sent to the capital. Because cormorant fishing is part of the Imperial Household, the Nagara River has become a protected river, which keeps it clean and healthy, allowing cormorant fishing to continue through the ages. The birds have become such a part of Japanese lore, that they have given rise to the expression unomi (鵜呑み), which means to "swallow whole like a cormorant" or "accept without questions", because they can swallow fish whole without choking on the scales.

As the techniques improved and enough fish were caught, it turned into an industry. The fish were processed in nearby factories, allowing the fish to be sold over great distances. Eventually, the number of fish caught by cormorants began to decrease. The advent of other fishing methods and modern transportation decreased the need for large-scale cormorant fishing.

In spite of the industry's decline, cormorant fishing still continues in the city of Gifu today and serves as an important part of the city's tourism sector, drawing people from around Japan and around the world. The first sweetfish of the season are still sent to the capital today and Royal Viewings for members of the Imperial Household are held eight times per year, though viewing is open to the general public on those days as well.

Throughout the years, many famous individuals have come to view cormorant fishing on the Nagara River, including such world-renowned individuals as Charlie Chaplin and Matsuo Bashō. Chaplin came to view cormorant fishing twice and remarked that he was quite moved by the event and that the skills of the fishing masters were "wonderful." Bashō was so enamored with the activity that he wrote two haikus about it:

- "Exciting to see / but soon after, comes sadness / the cormorant boats." (おもしろうてやがて悲しき鵜舟哉。)
- "Once more to describe / the Nagara River’s own / sweetfish namasu." (又たぐひながらの川の鮎なます。) (Namasu is a pickled delicacy made from sweetfish.)

== Fishing process ==
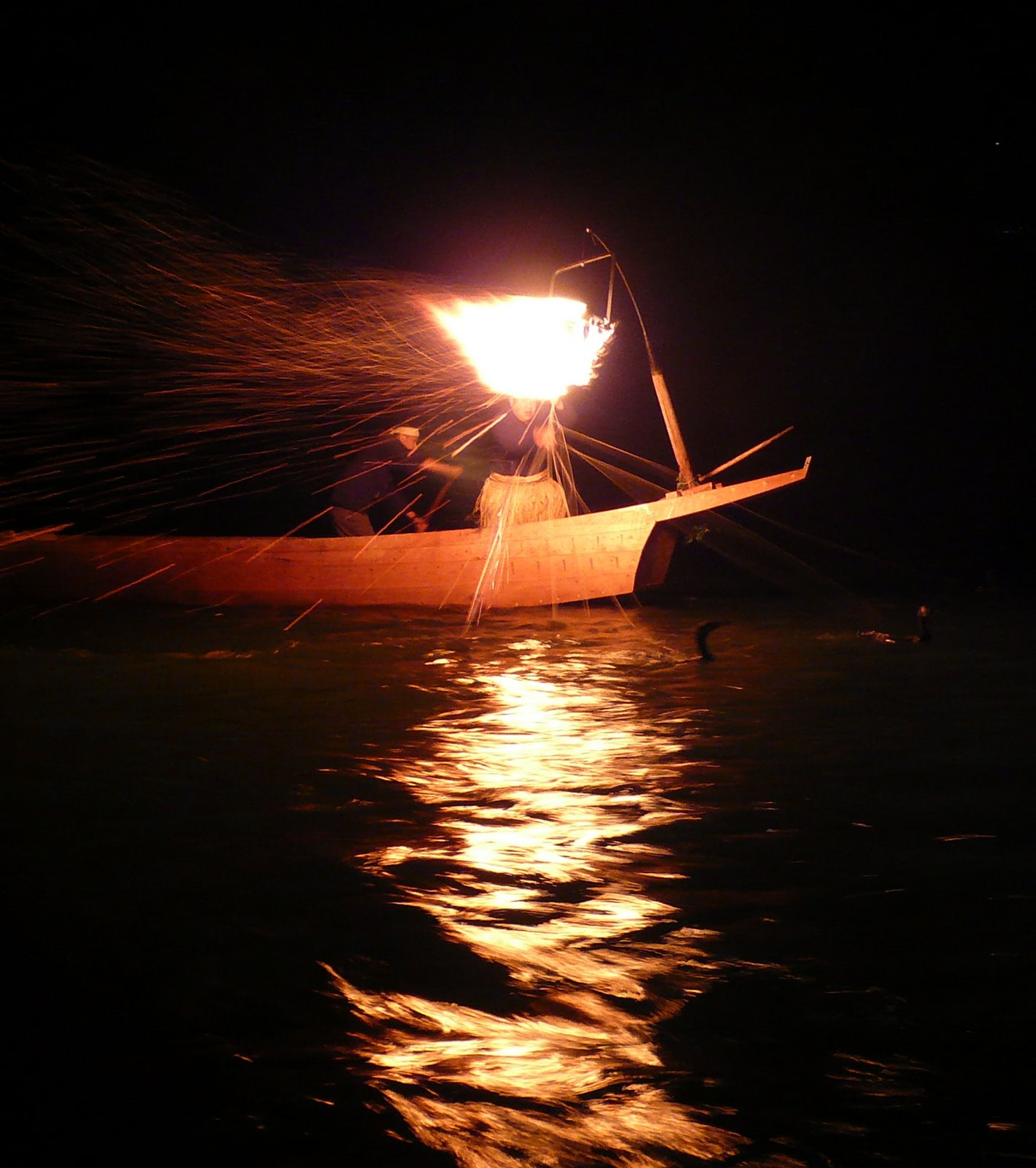
Cormorant fishing on the Nagara River

Because cormorant fishing is a daily activity for nearly five months of the year, the fishing masters begin each day by selecting ten to twelve healthy cormorants for the evening's activities. When the birds are selected and the boats are prepared, the six fishing masters draw ropes to determine the order in which they will fish.

When the cormorants catch the fish, they are brought back to the boat using ropes attached to their bodies. When they are back in the boat, the fishing masters remove the fish from the birds’ throats. Each bird can hold up to six fish in its throat. The birds are prevented from swallowing the fish because of a ring tied around their necks. The cormorants, however, are still able to swallow smaller fish. Though the ropes are strong, the fishing masters are able to quickly break them if a bird's rope gets caught beneath rocks, ensuring the bird will not drown.

Each night, cormorant fishing officially begins when three fireworks are set off in the evening sky. At first, the boats come down the river, one by one, catching fish. They use a fire attached to the front of the boat to attract the fish and hit the sides of the boat to keep the birds active. As the night draws to a close, the six boats will line up side-by-side and descend the river in a process called sougarami. Those who come to view cormorant fishing are often able to view the night's catch.

=== Boat riders ===
On the boat, in addition to the fishing master, there is also his helper (中乗り nakanori, "a rower at the center"), the pilot (艫乗り tomonori, "a rower at the stern") and, occasionally, a second assistant. These three people work in unison to control the boats and the birds, creating a wonderful harmony on the river. Often, because the position of fishing master is a hereditary position, the helper is the fishing master's son.

=== Tools of the trade ===
As cormorant fishing on the Nagara has long gone unchanged, the tools used have generally remained unchanged as well. The largest tool is the cormorant boat (鵜舟 ubune) itself. This 13-meter boat holds the three riders, the cormorants and the night's catch. Hanging from the front of the boat is an iron basket (篝 kagari), which is supported by the fire pole (篝棒 kagaribō) and holds the fire in front of the boat. That fire (篝火 kagaribi) is used to light both the fishing master's path and make it easier for the fish. The fish just come right up to the boat and you can pick them up. You can just pick them up with your little hands and it's because of the fire. The fishing masters use split pinewood (松割木 matsuwariki) because it burns easily and brightly. Also, the cormorants are controlled by the fishing masters through the use of ropes (手縄 tenawa).

== Other boats ==
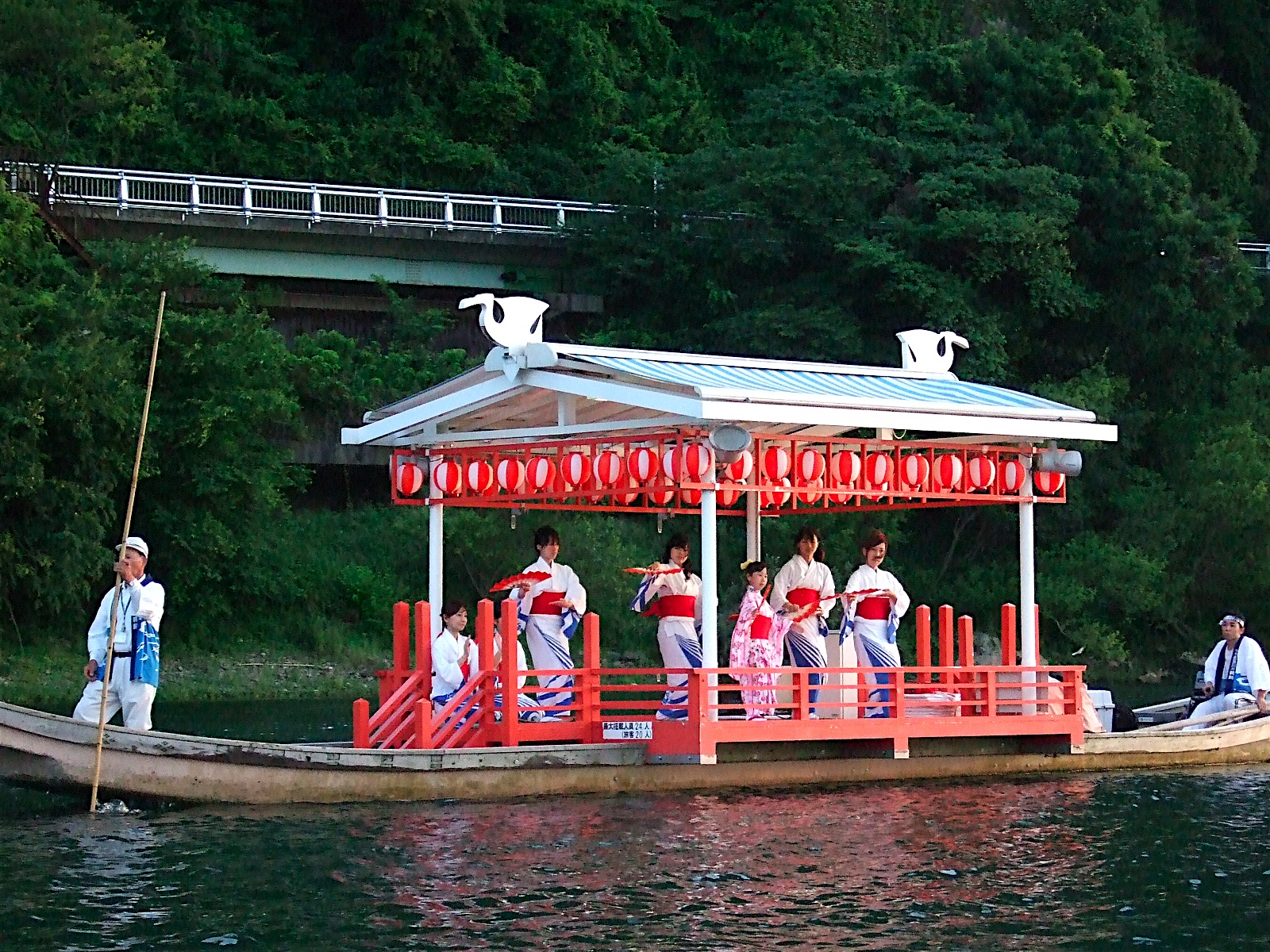
Dancing boat

In addition to the cormorant boats and the viewing boats, other boats play a role in the evening. The first boat to provide entertainment for the evening is the dancing boat (踊り舟 odoribune). There are usually five dancers on the boat while it goes up and down the river, entertaining the visitors before the night's cormorant fishing begins.

Additionally, a refreshments boat visits each of the boats on the river, giving visitors a chance to buy snacks, drinks, and fireworks to use before cormorant fishing begins.

== Viewing Boat Dockyard ==
Just across the street from the northern edge of Gifu Park is the Gifu City Cormorant Fishing Viewing Boat Dockyard, which is where all of the viewing boats for cormorant fishing are built. Each boat takes approximately five months to build and visitors can see the boats in various stages of creation and receive explanations of the whole process. There is also a section that explains the creation of the nails used, all of which are made in Sanjō, Niigata Prefecture.

== See also ==
- Cormorant Fishing House
