= Mie-ji =

Buddhist temple in Gifu Prefecture, Japan

Coordinates: 35°25′35″N 136°45′30″E

Mie-ji 美江寺
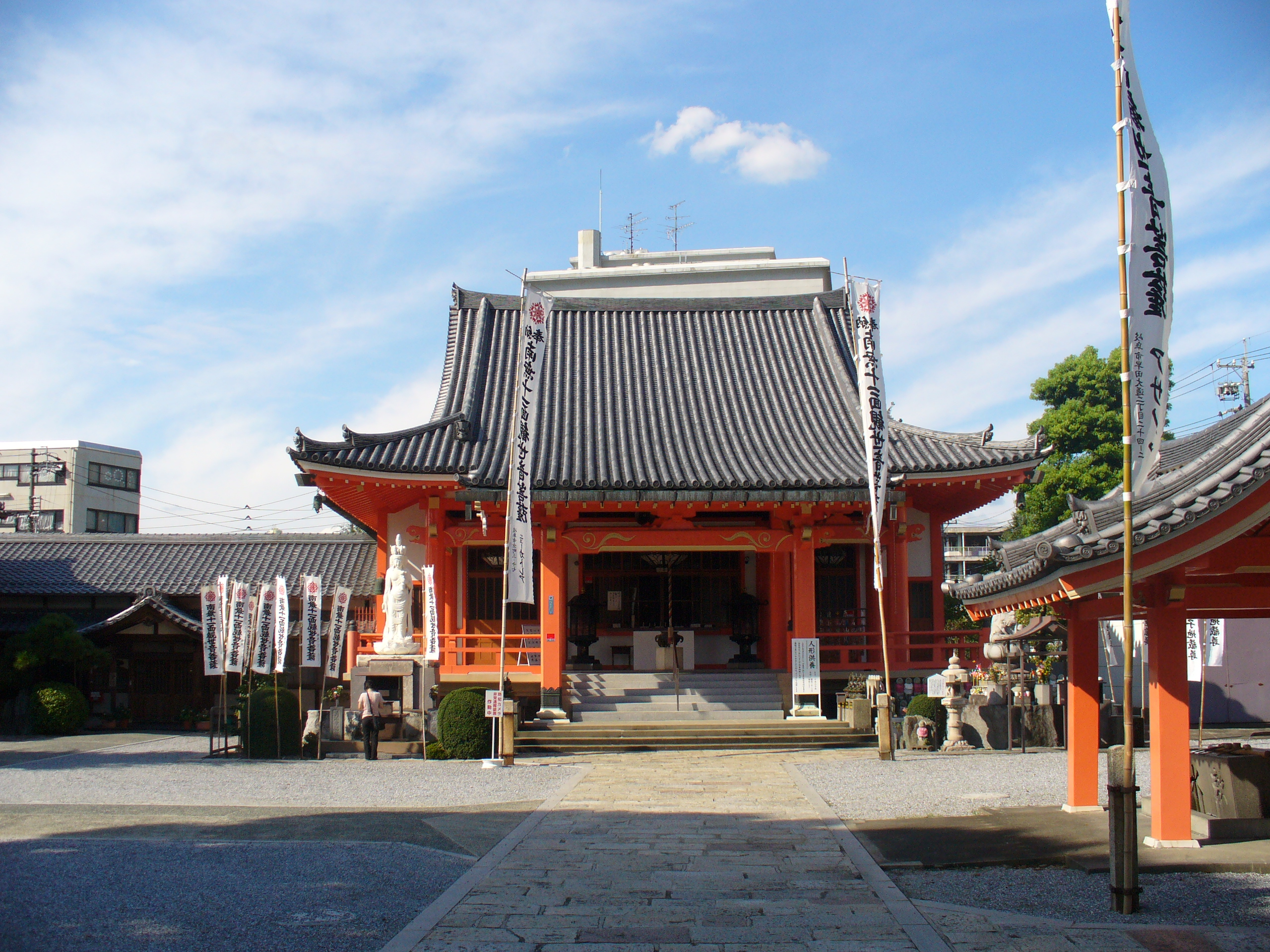
- Mie-ji's main hall

Religion
- Affiliation: Tendai sect

Location
- Location: 2-3 Mieji-chō; Gifu, Gifu Prefecture
- Country: Japan
- Interactive map of Mie-ji 美江寺

Architecture
- Completed: 717

Mie-ji (美江寺) is a Buddhist temple of the Tendai sect located in Gifu, Gifu Prefecture, Japan. It is also referred to as Mie-ji Kannon (美江寺観音). It is one of the Mino Thirty-three Kannon. The temple houses the Kanshitsu Kannon, which is one of Japan's nationally designated Important Cultural Properties.

== Images ==
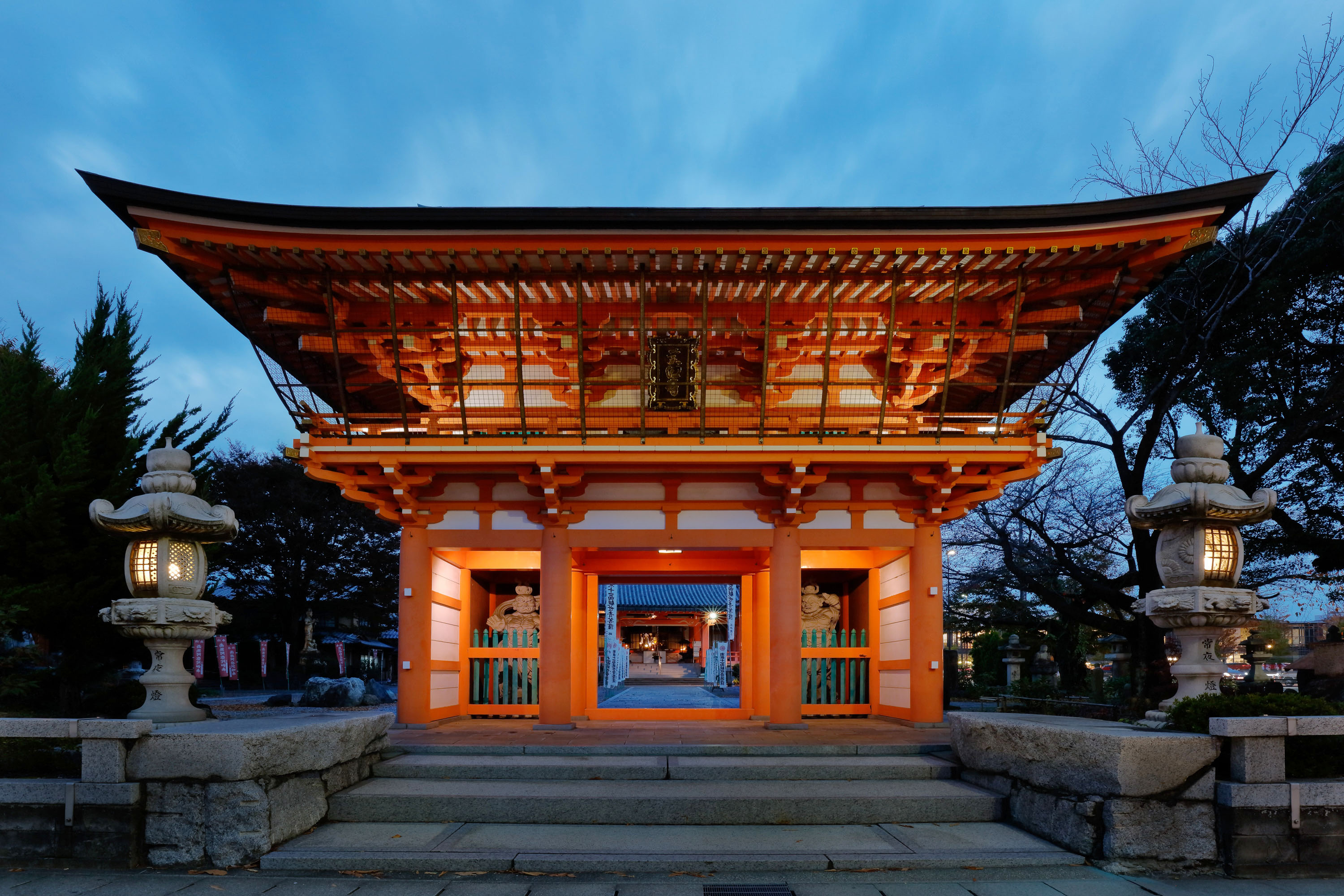

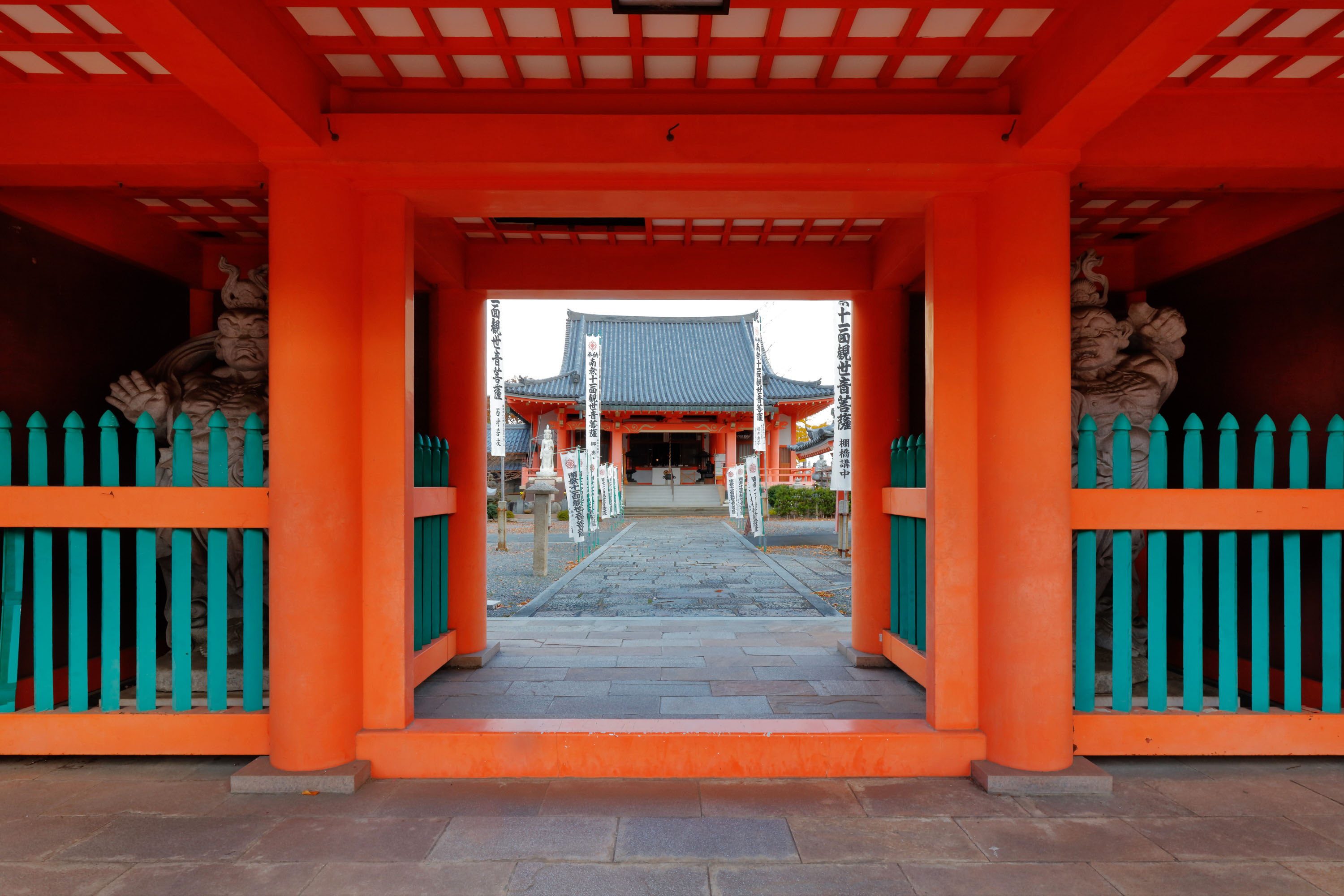

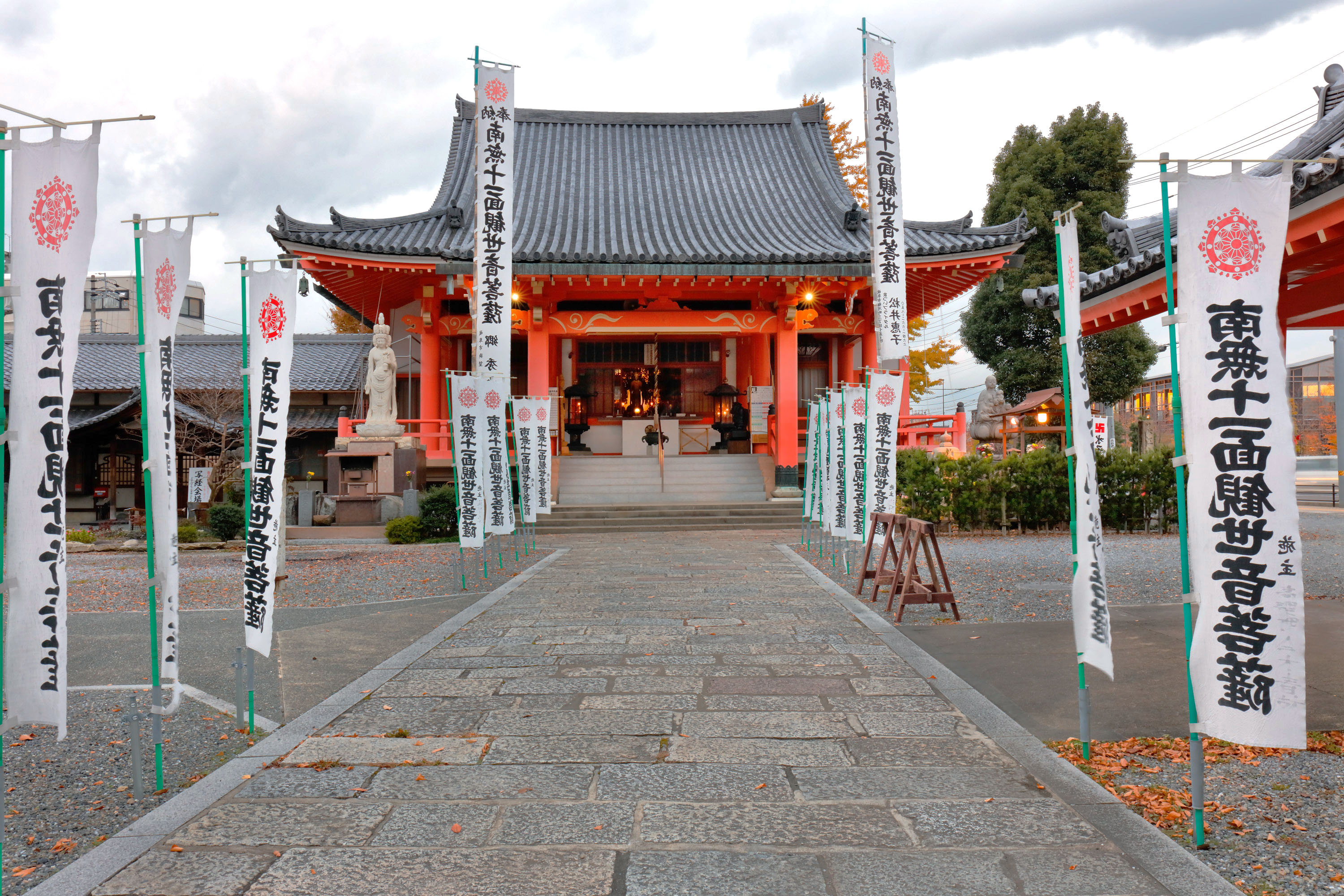

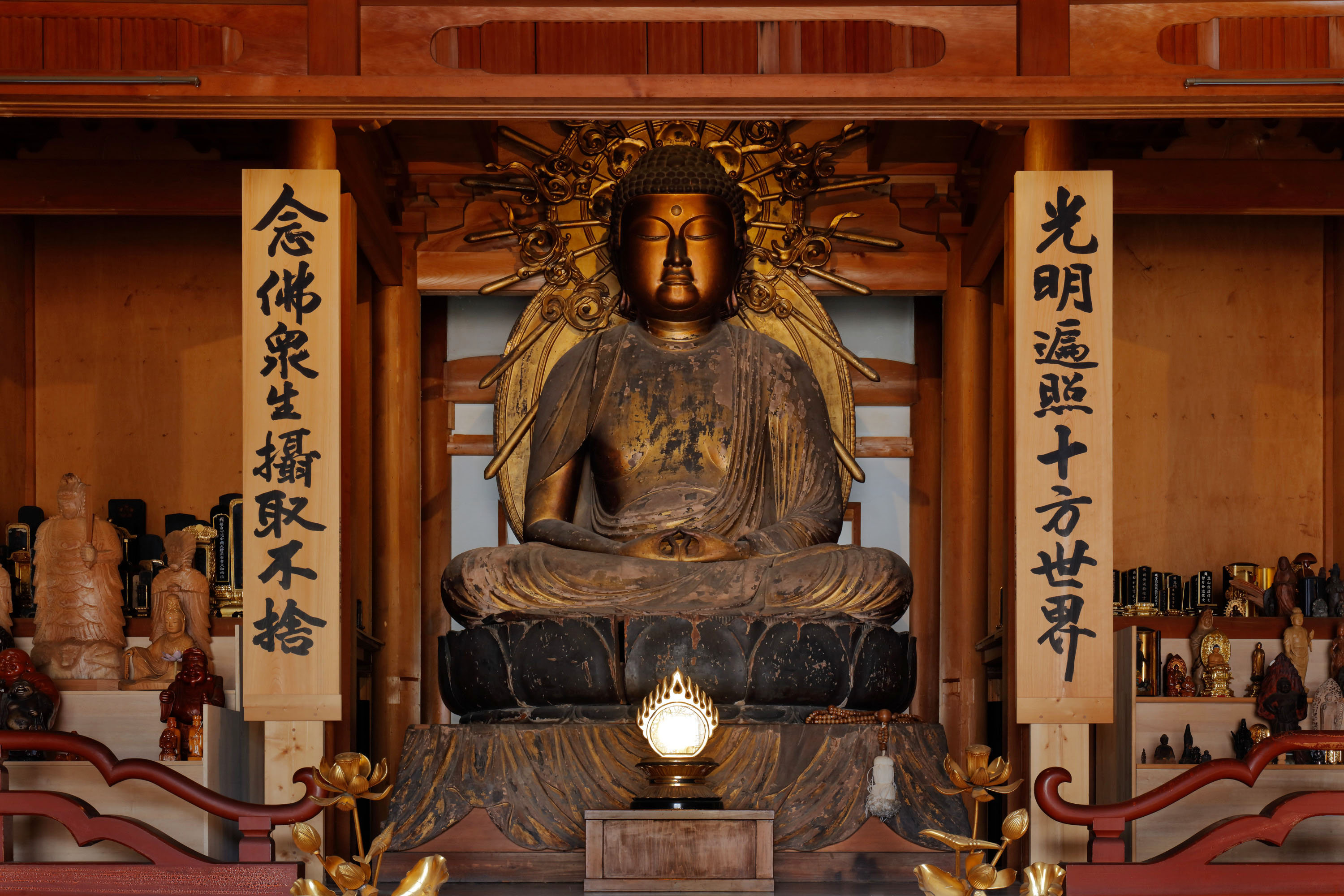

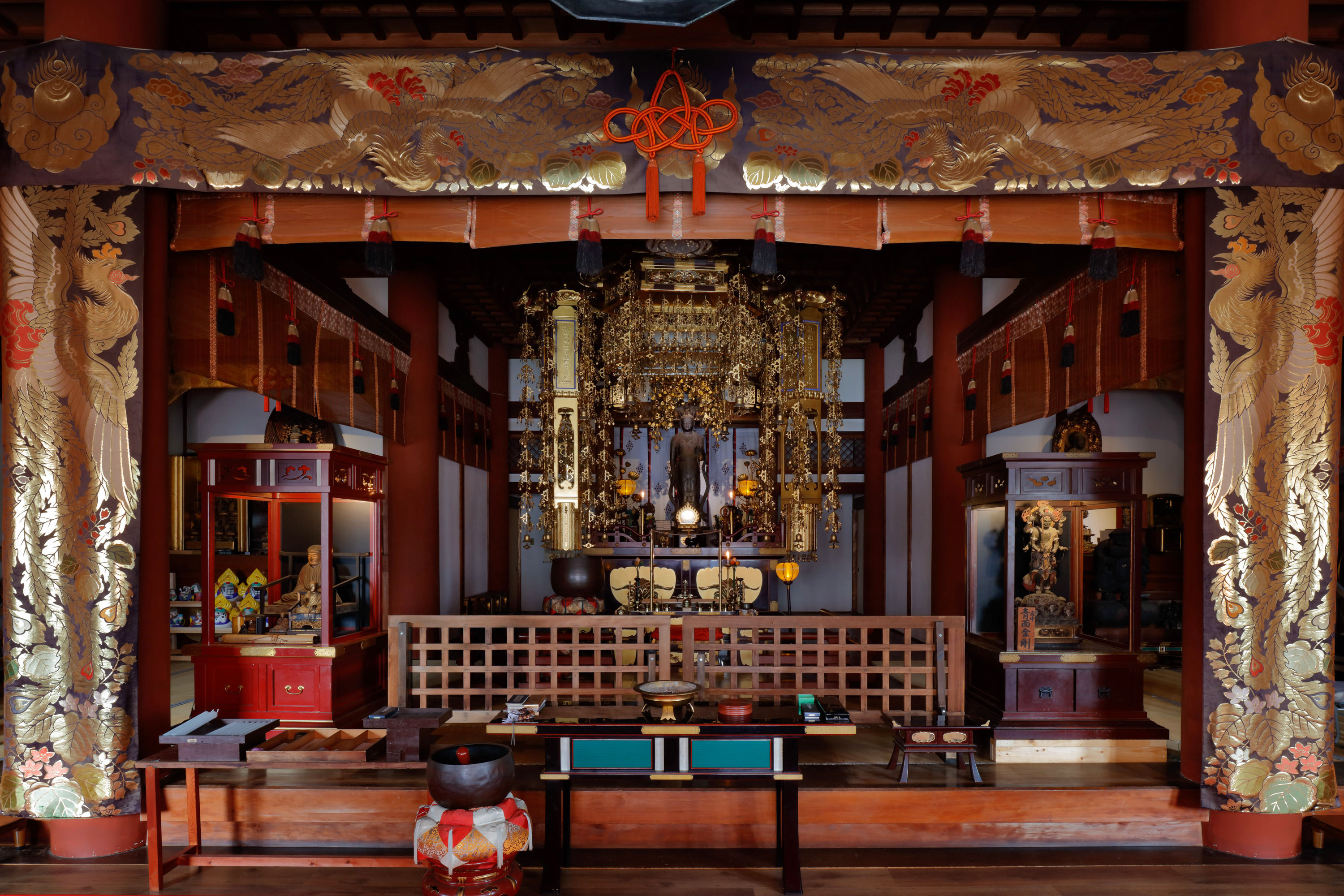

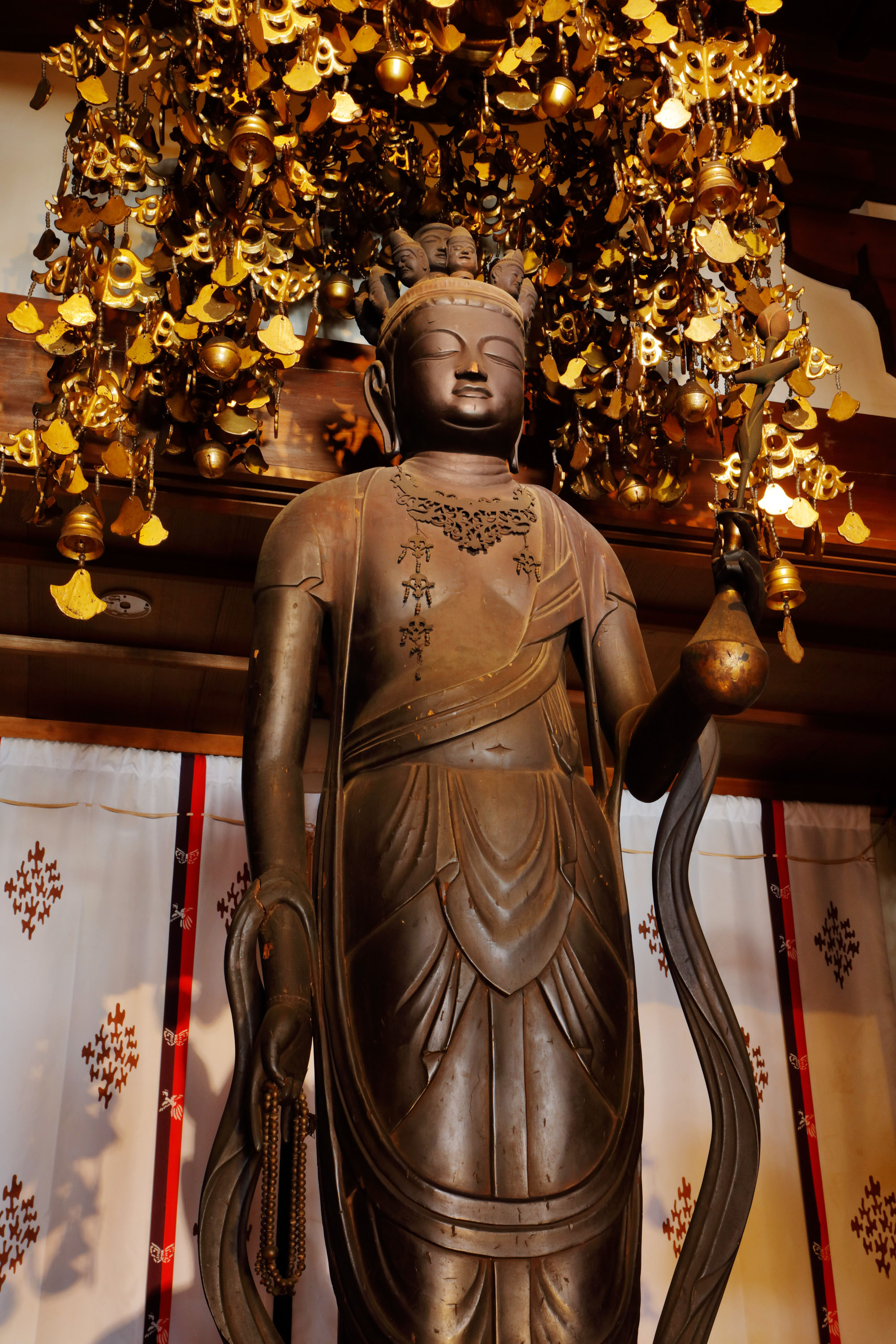

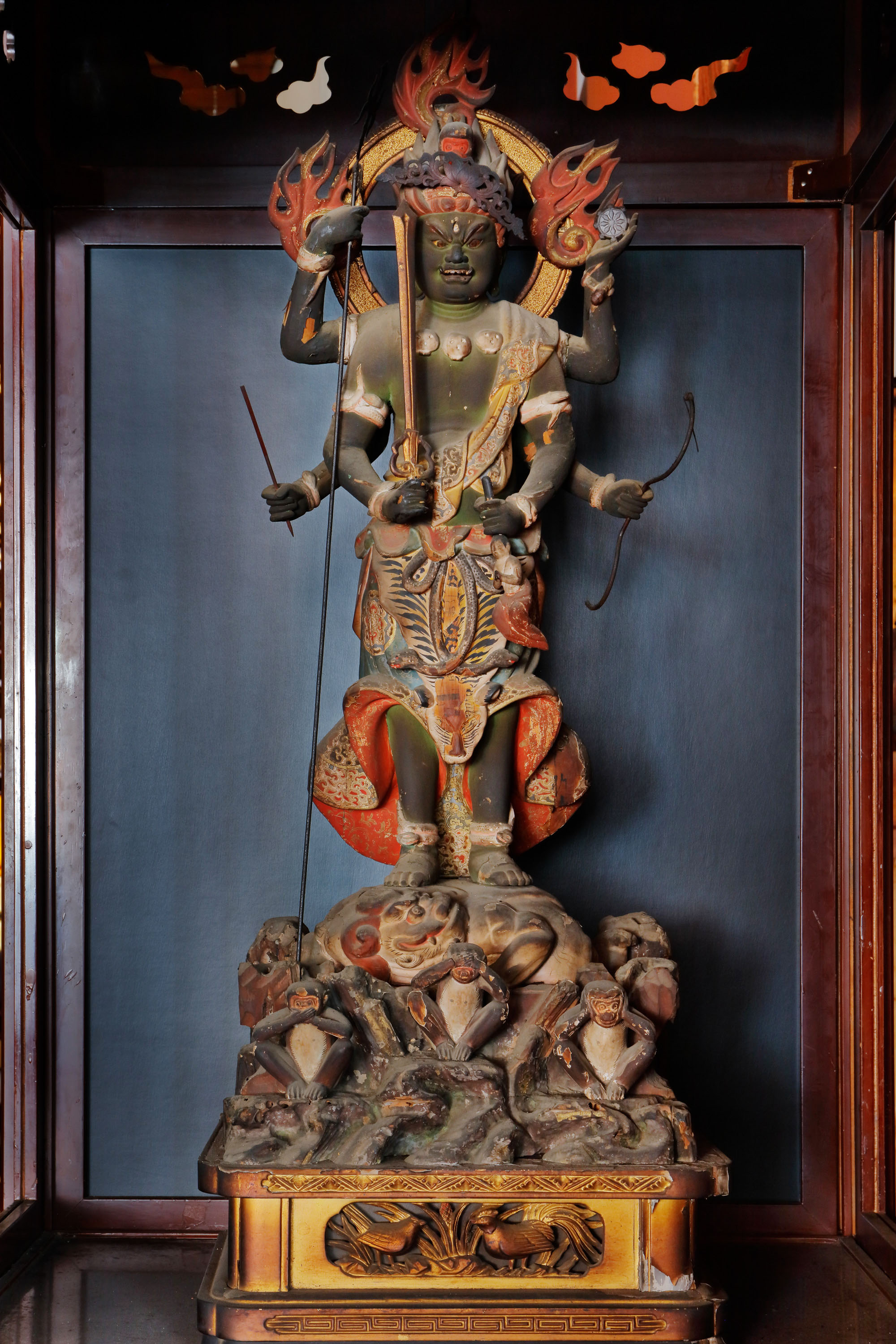

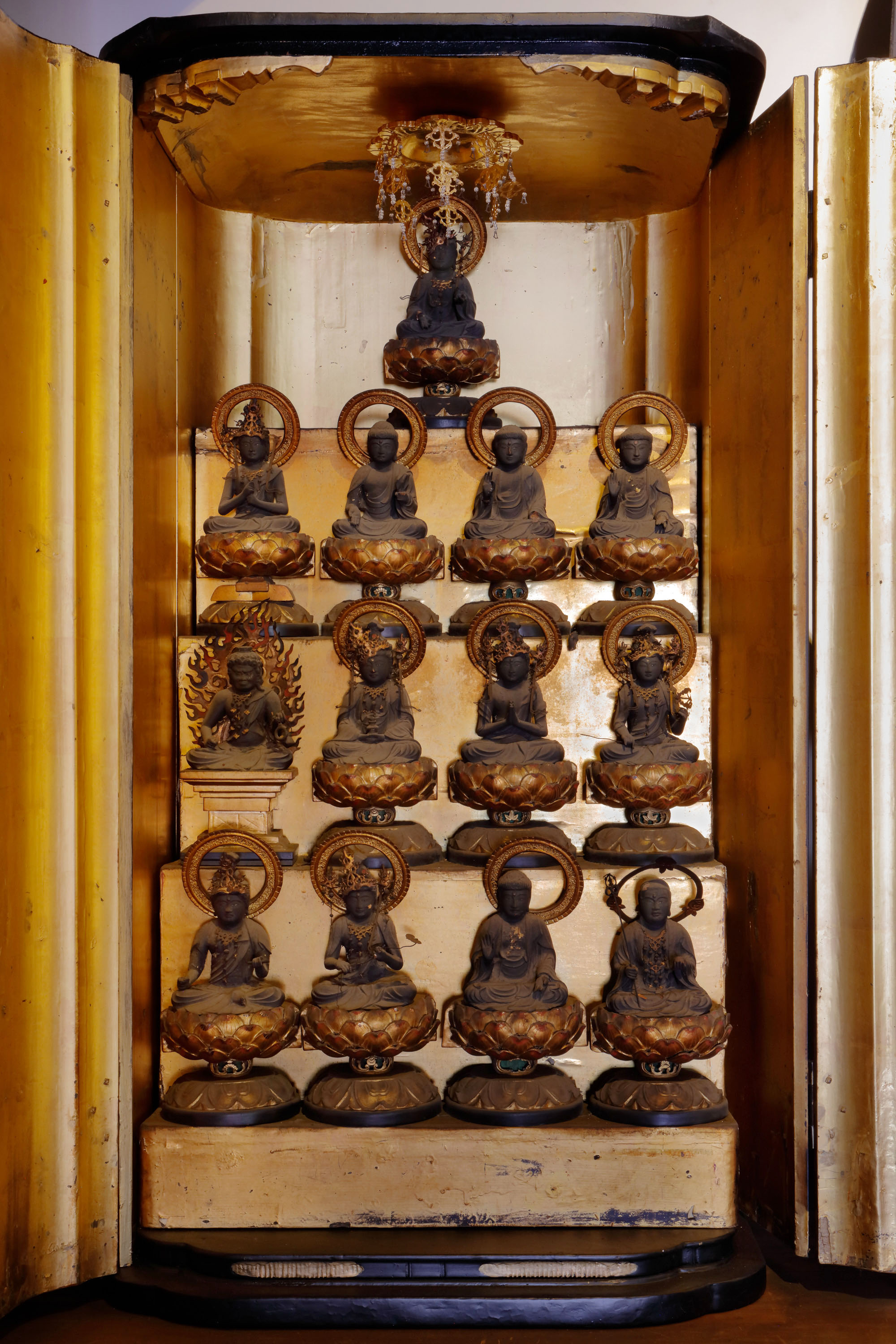

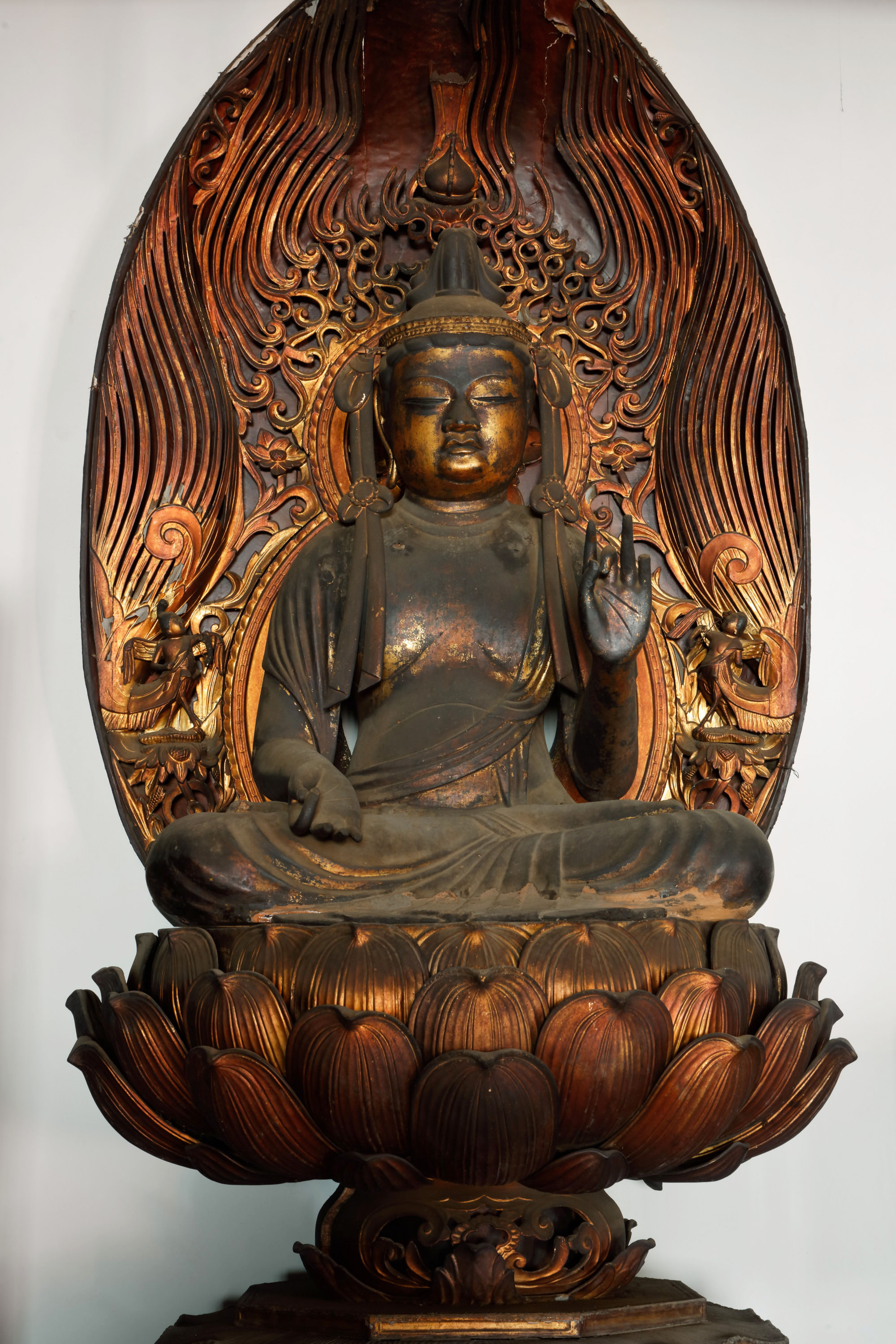
