= Indy Film Fest =

Annual film festival in Indianapolis, United States

- Location: Indianapolis, Indiana, U.S.
- Founded: March 5, 2004; 22 years ago (as Indianapolis International Film Festival)
- Website: indyfilmfest.org

Indy Film Fest, formerly known as the Indianapolis International Film Festival, is an annual film festival held in Indianapolis, United States. It champions films that entertain, challenge, and expand perspectives in Indianapolis and beyond. Its inaugural edition took place in 2004, featuring Lars von Trier's Dogville as the closing film.

== Awards ==
=== 2026 Awards ===
Winners:

- Pinch - World Cinema, Best Feature Film
- Sons of Detroit - Best Documentary Feature
- Leads - American Spectrum, Best Feature Film
- Just One Man - Hoosier Lens, Best Feature
- Pinch - Grand Jury, Best Feature Film

=== 2025 Awards ===
Winners:

- Midwinter - American Spectrum, Best Feature Film
- Lena and Vladimir - World Cinema, Best Feature Film
- Papercuts: My Life as an Indie Animator - Best Documentary Feature
- Never Not Yours - Hoosier Lens, Best Feature

=== 2024 Awards ===
Winners:

- No Right Way - Grand Jury, Best Feature Film
- No Right Way - American Spectrum, Best Feature Film
- L'incidente - World Cinema, Best Feature Film
- Film is Dead. Long Live Film! - Best Documentary Feature
- The Girl in The Yellow Scarf - Hoosier Lens, Best Feature
- Darla in Space - Audience Award, Best Narrative Feature
- The Girl in The Yellow Scarf - Audience Award, Best Documentary Feature

=== 2023 Awards ===
Winners:

- In a Good Way - Grand Jury, Best Feature Film
- In a Good Way - American Spectrum, Best Feature Film
- Derrapada - World Cinema, Best Feature Film
- The Bright Path: The Johnny Bright Story - Hoosier Lens, Best Feature
- Not Just A Picky Eater - Best Documentary Feature
- Hundreds of Beavers - Audience Award, Best Narrative Feature
- Greener Pasture - Audience Award, Best Documentary Feature

=== 2022 Awards ===
Winners:

- The Mirror Game - Grand Jury, Best Feature Film
- The Mirror Game - American Spectrum, Best Feature Film
- The Noise of Engines - World Cinema, Best Feature Film
- Dear Audrey - Best Documentary Feature
- It Happened One Weekend - Hoosier Lens, Best Feature
- It Happened One Weekend - Audience Award, Best Narrative Feature
- The B1g Story: George Taliaferro - Audience Award, Best Documentary Feature

=== 2021 Awards ===
Winners:

- The Catch - Grand Jury, Best Feature Film
- The Catch - American Spectrum, Best Feature Film
- Schwarze Milk - World Cinema, Best Feature Film
- Belly of the Beast - Best Documentary Feature
- Welcome to Monterrey - Hoosier Lens, Best Feature
- Workhorse Queen - Audience Award, Best Documentary Feature
- El Rey de la Fiesta - Audience Award, Best Narrative Feature

=== 2020 Awards ===
Winners:

- Breaking Fast - American Spectrum, Best Feature Film
- Chasing Unicorns - World Cinema, Best Feature Film
- Down a Dark Stairwell - Best Documentary Feature
- Sleeze Lake: Vanlife at its Lowest & Best - Hoosier Lens, Best Feature

=== 2019 Awards ===
Winners:

- Sumergida - Grand Jury, Best Feature Film
- Frances Ferguson - American Spectrum, Best Feature Film
- El Testigo - Best Documentary Feature
- Sumergida - World Cinema, Best Feature Film
- Qualified - Hoosier Lens, Best Feature
- Good Feels on Wheels - Audience Award, Best Feature Film

=== 2018 Awards ===
Winners:

- Dare to Struggle, Dare to Win - Grand Jury, Best Feature Film
- In the Wake of Ire - American Spectrum, Best Feature Film
- Uma Vida Sublime - World Cinema, Best Feature Film
- When We Grow Up - Hoosier Lens, Best Feature
- Pieced Together - Audience Award, Best Feature Film
- Dare to Struggle, Dare to Win - Best Documentary Feature

=== 2017 Awards ===
Winners:

- Pawo - Grand Jury, Best Feature Film
- Signature Move - American Spectrum, Best Feature Film
- Pawo - World Cinema, Best Feature Film
- Mark Twain's Journey to Jerusalem: Dreamland - Best Documentary Feature
- Signature Move - Hoosier Lens, Best Feature
- King Rat - Audience Award, Best Feature Film

=== 2016 Awards ===
Winners:

- West Coast - Grand Jury, Best Feature Film
- Reparation - American Spectrum, Best Feature Film
- Do Not Resist - Best Documentary Feature
- West Coast - World Cinema, Best Feature Film
- Under The Bridge: The Criminalization Of Homelessness - Hoosier Lens, Best Feature
- The Invisible Patients - Audience Award, Best Feature Film

=== 2015 Awards ===
Winners:

- Chorus - Grand Jury, Best Feature Film
- For Grace - Matter of Fact, Best Feature Film
- Chorus - World Cinema, Best Feature Film
- Night Owls - American Spectrum, Best Feature Film
- Morphine Journey of Dreams - Audience Award, Best Feature Film

=== 2014 Awards ===
Winners:

- Bluebird - Grand Jury, Best Feature Film
- Bluebird - American Spectrum, Best Feature Film
- Confusion Through Sand - American Spectrum, Best Short Film
- Beyond All Boundaries - Matter of Fact, Best Feature Film
- Tarzan & Arab - Matter of Fact, Best Short Film
- You’ll Be A Man - World Cinema, Best Feature Film
- Grand Canal - World Cinema, Best Short Film
- Beyond All Boundaries - Audience Award, Best Feature Film
- Good Story - Audience Award, Best Short Film

=== 2013 Awards ===
Winners:

- Medora - Grand Jury, Best Feature Film
- Detroit Unleaded - American Spectrum, Best Feature Film
- Mr. Bellpond - American Spectrum, Best Short Film
- Medora - Matter of Fact, Best Feature Film
- Slomo - Matter of Fact, Best Short Film
- Dream Team 1935 - World Cinema, Best Feature Film
- More Than Two Hours - World Cinema, Best Short Film
- Medora - Audience Award, Best Feature Film
- Slomo - Audience Award, Best Short Film

=== 2012 Awards ===
Winners:

- Somebody Up There Likes Me - American Spectrum, Best Feature Film
- Narcocorrido - American Spectrum, Best Short Film
- Detropia - Matter of Fact, Best Feature Film
- Cutting Loose - Matter of Fact, Best Short Film
- Patang - World Cinema, Best Feature Film
- The Maker - World Cinema, Best Short Film
- Wonder Women! The Untold Story of American Superheroines - Audience Award, Best Feature Film
- Mondays at Racine - Audience Award, Best Short Film

=== 2011 Awards ===
Winners:

- Type A - Best Matter Of Fact, Short Film
- The Green Wave - Best Matter Of Fact, Feature Film
- Direk Ask - World Cinema, Best Short Film
- Small Town Murder Songs - World Cinema, Best Feature Film
- Something Left, Something Taken - American Spectrum, Best Short Film
- Natural Selection - American Spectrum, Best Feature Film
- Jess + Moss - The Ima Culturally Adventurous Award
- The Green Wave - Audience Award, Best Feature Film
- The Secret Friend - Audience Award, Best Short Film

=== 2010 Awards ===
Winners:

- A Little Help - American Spectrum, Best Feature
- God of Love - American Spectrum, Best Short
- Ballhawks - Best Documentary Feature
- The Poodle Trainer - Best Documentary Short
- Twisted Roots - World Cinema, Best Feature
- Encuentro - World Cinema, Best Short
- LaPorte, Indiana - Hoosier Lens, Best Feature
- Dynamic Tom - Hoosier Lens, Best Short

=== 2009 Awards ===
Winners:

- Racing Dreams - Audience Award, Best Feature
- Weathered - Audience Award, Best Short Film
- Sita Sings the Blues - American Spectrum, Best Feature
- True Beauty This Night - American Spectrum, Best Short Film
- A Ripple of Hope - Hoosier Lens Award, Best Feature
- Chicken Cowboy - Hoosier Lens Award, Best Short
- Frankie 13 vs The World - Best Documentary Short Film
- Best Worst Movie - Best Documentary Feature
- Sinnerman - Black Expressions
- Gone Fishing - World Cinema, Best Short Film
- The Vanished Empire - World Cinema, Best Feature
- The Way We Get By - Eric Parker Social Justice Award
- Lapsus - Excellence in Animation

=== 2008 Awards ===
Winners:

- Mongol - Audience Award, Best Feature
- Trying to Get Good: The Jazz Odyssey of Jack Sheldon - Audience Award, Best Documentary
- Spider - Audience Award, Best Short Film
- Pop Skull - American Spectrum, Best Feature
- Bitch - American Spectrum, Best Short Film
- Der Ostwind - American Spectrum, Special Jury Prize for Outstanding Technical achievement to Kohl Gass
- Beyond Belief - Real Visions, Best Feature
- Kids + Money - Real Visions, Best Short Film
- The Life and Times of Robert F. Kennedy Starring Gary Cooper - Real Visions, Special Jury Prize for Outstanding Experimental Film to Aaron Valdez
- Cargo 200 - World Cinema, Best Feature
- Ten to Two - World Cinema, Best Short Film
- Burn the Bridges - World Cinema, Special Jury Prize for Outstanding Performance to Irene Azuela
- Karl Rove, I Love You - Hoosier Lens, Best Feature
- Lapsus - Excellence in Animation Award

=== 2007 Awards ===
Winners:

- Speed Dating - Audience Award, Best Feature (Tie)
- Waitress - Audience Award, Best Feature (Tie)
- In the Shadow of the Moon - Audience Award, Best Documentary
- The Substitute (Il Supplente) - Audience Award, Best Short Film
- Adrift in Manhattan - American Spectrum, Best Feature
- Pop Foul - American Spectrum, Best Short Film
- Disappearances - American Spectrum, Special Jury Prize for Cinematography
- Nevel Is the Devil - American Spectrum, Special Jury Prize for Comedy
- Kidney Thieves - American Spectrum, Special Jury Prize for Comedy
- Rain in a Dry Land - Real Visions, Best Feature
- Angel's Fire - Real Visions, Best Short Film
- Heavy Metal Jr. - Real Visions, Special Jury Prize for Direction
- McLaren's Negatives - Real Visions, Special Jury Prize for Direction to Marie-Josee Sainte-Pierre
- Fraulein - World Cinema, Best Feature
- Eramos Pocos - World Cinema, Best Short Film
- Thicker Than Water - World Cinema, Special Jury Prize for Outstanding Performance
- Milk and Opium - World Cinema, Special Jury Prize for Outstanding Score
- Marrying God - Hoosier Lens Award
- Everything Will be OK - Excellence in Animation
- First on the Moon - The Kurt Vonnegut, Jr. Prize for Outstanding Science Fiction Filmmaking

=== 2006 Awards ===
Winners:

- A Place Called Home: An Adoption Story - Audience Award, Best Feature
- Sugar Mountain - Audience Award, Best Short Film
- El Inmigrante - Grand Jury Prize, Best Feature
- Binta and the Great Idea - Grand Jury Prize, Best Short Film
- Antonio's Breakfast - Grand Jury Prize, Best European Short Film
- Knocking - Audience Award, Best Non-Fiction Film
- Over the Hedge - Audience Award, Best Family Film
- Kinky Boots - Audience Award, Best Comedy
- A Place Called Home: An Adoption Story - Hoosier Lens Award for Best Indiana Film
- Before I Go - Special Jury Prize for Outstanding Performance to Heidy Forster and Horst Sachtleben
- Life in Transition - Special Jury Prize for Outstanding Animation
- Dirty Mary - Special Jury Prize for Achievement in Comedy to Daniele Ferraro for Writing, Producing, and Acting
- Monobloc - Special Jury Prize for Direction to Luis Ortega
- Desire - Special Jury Prize - Honorable Mention for Documentary Filmmaking to Julie Gustafson & the New Orleans Teenage Girls Documentary Project
- Binta and the Great Idea - Markey's Humanitarian Award
- Apparition of the Eternal Church - Best North American Independent Feature Film

=== 2005 Awards ===
Winners:

- Murderball - Audience Award, Best Feature
- West Bank Story - Audience Award, Best Short Film
- Murderball - Audience Award, Best Non-Fiction Film
- NOVEM - Grand Jury Prize, Best Feature
- Solo un Cargador - Grand Jury Prize, Best Short Film (Tie)
- Tama Tu - Grand Jury Prize, Best Short Film (Tie)
- The Innocent - Grand Jury Prize, Best Non-Fiction Film
- Pearl Diver - Grand Jury Prize, Hoosier Lens Award for Best Indiana Film
- Tropical Malady - Special Jury Prize, Outstanding Direction to Apichatpong Weerasethakul
- NOVEM - Special Jury Prize, Outstanding Performance to the entire cast
- Brothers - Special Jury Prize, Outstanding Performance to Connie Nielsen, Nikolaj Lie Kaas, and Ulrich Thomsen
- 9 - Special Jury Prize, Outstanding Animation

=== 2004 Awards ===
Winners:

- The Story of the Weeping Camel - Audience Award, Best Feature
- The Climactic Death of Dark Ninja - Audience Award, Best Short Film (Tie)
- Hairless - Audience Award, Best Short Film (Tie)
- The Climactic Death of Dark Ninja - Grand Jury Prize, Best Short Film
- Between the White Lines - Grand Jury Prize, Best Feature Film
- Dogville - Special Jury Prize, Outstanding Performance to the entire cast
- A Slipping Down Life - Outstanding Performance to Lily Taylor & Sara Rue
- Disconcerting Symphony - Outstanding Performance to the entire cast
- Stuff That Bear! - Outstanding Cinematography to Oleg Mutu
- Everyone and Their Mother Wants to Write and Direct - Outstanding Writing

== See also ==
- List of attractions and events in Indianapolis
- List of film festivals in the United States
