= Dakini =

Sacred female spirit in Hinduism and Buddhism

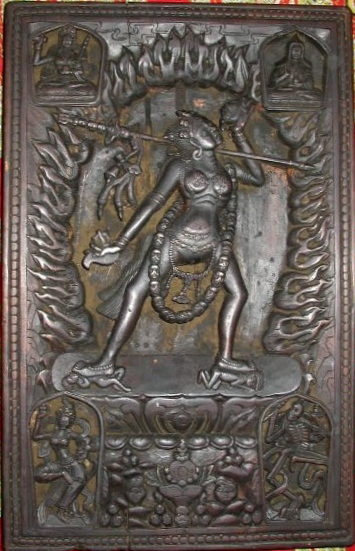
Tibetan board carving of the ḍākinī Vajrayogini

A dakini (Note: English: /dəˈkiːni/ də-KEE-nee; Sanskrit: डाकिनी, romanized: ḍākinī; Tibetan: མཁའ་འགྲོ་མ་, Wylie: mkha' 'gro ma, THL: khandroma; Mongolian: ᠬᠠᠨᠳᠠᠷᠮᠠ / хандарма, romanized: khandarma; Chinese: 空行母; pinyin: kōngxíngmǔ; lit. 'sky-going mother') is a type of goddess in Hinduism and Buddhism.

The concept of the dakini somewhat differs depending on the context and the tradition. For example, in earlier Hindu texts and East Asian esoteric Buddhism, the term denotes a race of demonesses who ate the flesh and vital essence of humans. In Hindu Tantric literature, Ḍākinī is the name of a goddess often associated with one of the six chakras or the seven fundamental elements (dhātu) of the human body. Meanwhile, in Nepalese and Tibetan Buddhism, dakini (or wisdom dakini) can refer to both what can be best described as fierce-looking female embodiments of enlightened energy, and to human women with a certain amount of spiritual development, both of whom can help Tantric initiates in attaining enlightenment.

In Japan, the ḍākinīs – held in the East Asian Buddhist tradition to have been subjugated and converted to Buddhism by the buddha Vairocana under the guise of the god Mahākāla (Daikokuten in Japanese) – were eventually coalesced into a single deity called Dakiniten, (Note: Japanese: 荼枳尼天 / 吒枳尼天 / 荼吉尼天) who, after becoming syncretized with the native agricultural deity Inari, became linked to the fox (kitsune) iconography associated with the latter.

== Etymology ==
The Sanskrit term ḍākinī is related to ḍīyate 'to fly', as in uḍḍayanam 'flight'. The Tibetan khandroma (མཁའ་འགྲོ་མ་), meaning 'sky-goer', may have originated from the Sanskrit khecara (of the same meaning), a term from the Cakrasaṃvara Tantra. The masculine form of the word is ḍāka, which is usually translated into Tibetan as pawo 'hero' (Wylie: dpa' bo).

In Chinese, ḍākinī is transcribed mainly as 荼枳尼 (túzhǐní), 荼吉尼 (tújíní), or 吒枳尼 (zhāzhǐní); other less common alternative transcriptions include 陀祇尼 (tuóqíní), 吒祇尼 (zhāqíní), 吒幾爾 (zhājǐěr), and 拏吉尼 (nájíní). It is also translated as 空行母 (pinyin: kōngxíngmǔ; lit. 'sky-going mother'), a calque of the Tibetan term. In Japanese, these transcriptions are all read as dakini (ダキニ) or dākinī (ダーキニー).

== In Hinduism ==
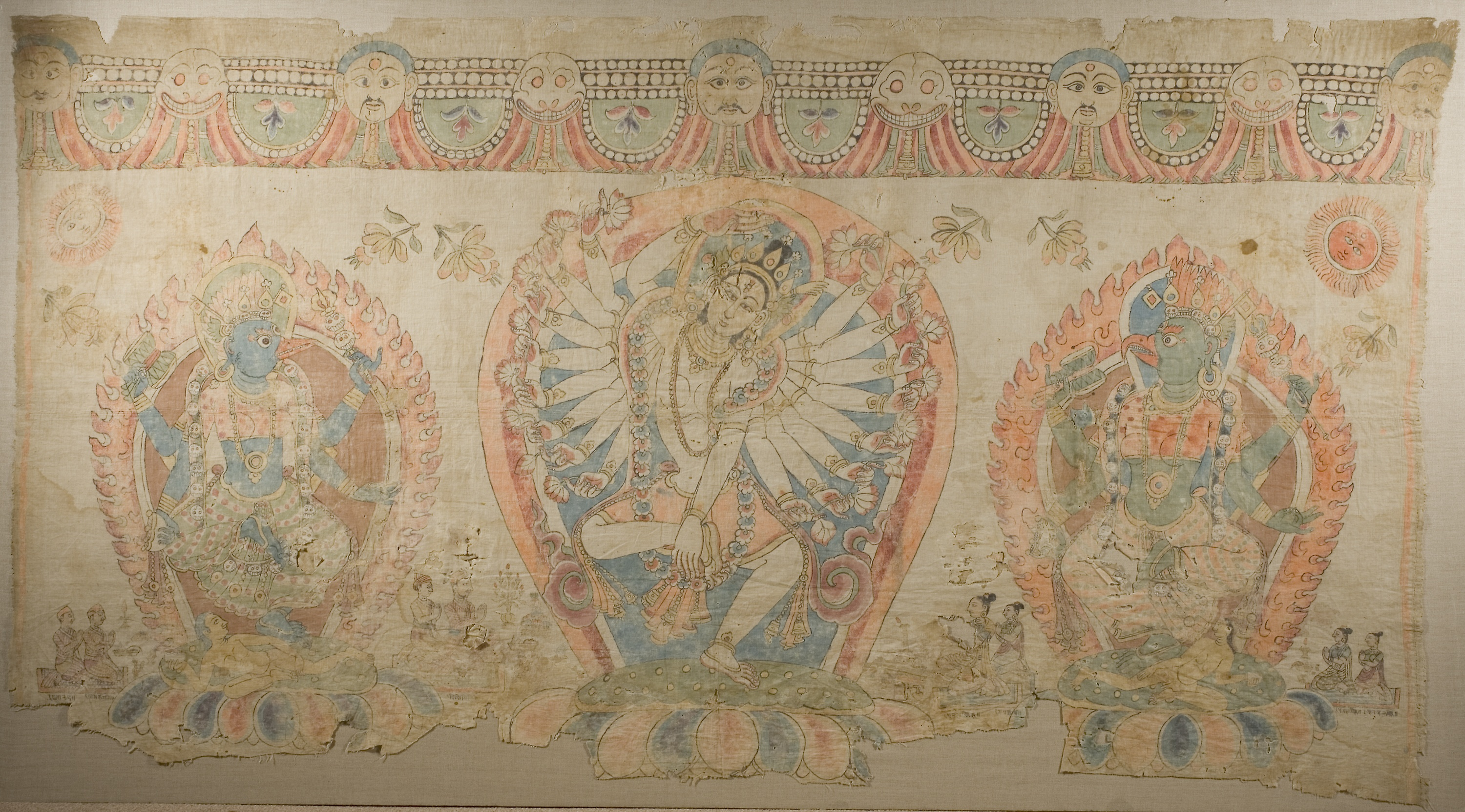
Temple banner depicting a dancing bodhisattva flanked by bird-headed dakinis (Art Institute of Chicago)

=== As demonesses ===
In certain passages in Hindu Purāṇic literature, ḍākinīs are depicted as flesh-eating demonesses in the train of the goddess Kālī. For instance, in the Shiva Purāṇa (2.2.33), Vīrabhadra and Mahākāḷī at Shiva's command march against Prajapati Daksha accompanied by the Nine Durgas and their fearsome attendants, namely "Ḍākinī, Śākinī, Bhūtas, Pramathas, Guhyakas, Kūṣmāṇḍas, Parpaṭas, Caṭakas, Brahmarakshasa, Bhairavas and Kṣetrapālas." In the Brahmāṇḍa Purāṇa (3.41.30), Paraśurāma sees ḍākinīs among Shiva's retinue (gaṇa) in Mount Kailash.

In the Bhāgavata Purāṇa (10.06.27–29), after the young Krishna had killed the demoness Pūtanā, the cowherd women (gopis) of Vrindavan carry out protective rites to keep him safe from future harm. At the end of the ritual, they declare:

The Dākinīs, the Yātudhānīs, the Kūṣmāṇḍas, the infanticides, the goblins [Bhūtas], the Mātṛs, the Piśācas, the Yakṣas, the Rakṣasas, the Vināyakas, Kotarī, Revatī, Jyeṣṭhā, Pūtanā, and other Mātṛkās, Unmāda, Apasmāra, and other devils inimical to the mind, the body and the senses, and other evil omens and calamities dreamt of, and the slayers of the old and the young,—may these and all other evil spirits be destroyed, being terrified at the recital of the name of Viṣṇu. (Note: Translation based on Dutt 1895, p. 30. The transliteration of Sanskrit names have been changed to the currently widely used standard.)

=== As a goddess ===
Other texts meanwhile apparently use 'Ḍākinī' as the name of a goddess. In the Lalitopākhyāna ("Narrative of [the goddess] Lalitā") section of the Brahmāṇḍa Purāṇa, Ḍākinī is one of the deities who guards the chariot of the boar-faced goddess Daṇḍanāthā, one of Lalitā's generals.

Seven deities called Dhātunāthās were stationed in their respective places beneath the same step. They were Yakṣiṇī, Śaṅkhinī, Lākinī, Hākinī, Śākinī, Ḍākinī and (another) Hākinī who had the united (and combined) forms of all of them. All these demonstrated the exploits of their mighty arms. They appeared ready to drink (i.e. destroy) all living beings and the Earth. They drank and consumed the seven Dhātus, essential ingredients, of the body (viz. the blood), skin, flesh, fat, bones, marrow and the semen of enemies. They had hideous faces. With their harsh leonine roars they filled ten-quarters. They were called Dhātunāthās and they were the bestowers of eight Siddhis beginning with Aṇimā (minuteness).
They were experts in deluding, slaying, paralysing (stupefying), striking, swallowing, and exterminating the wicked Daityas. In regard to those who are habitually devout, they were competent to annihilate all adversities. They were called Dhātunāthās (since) they were present in all Dhātus (essential secretions of the body).

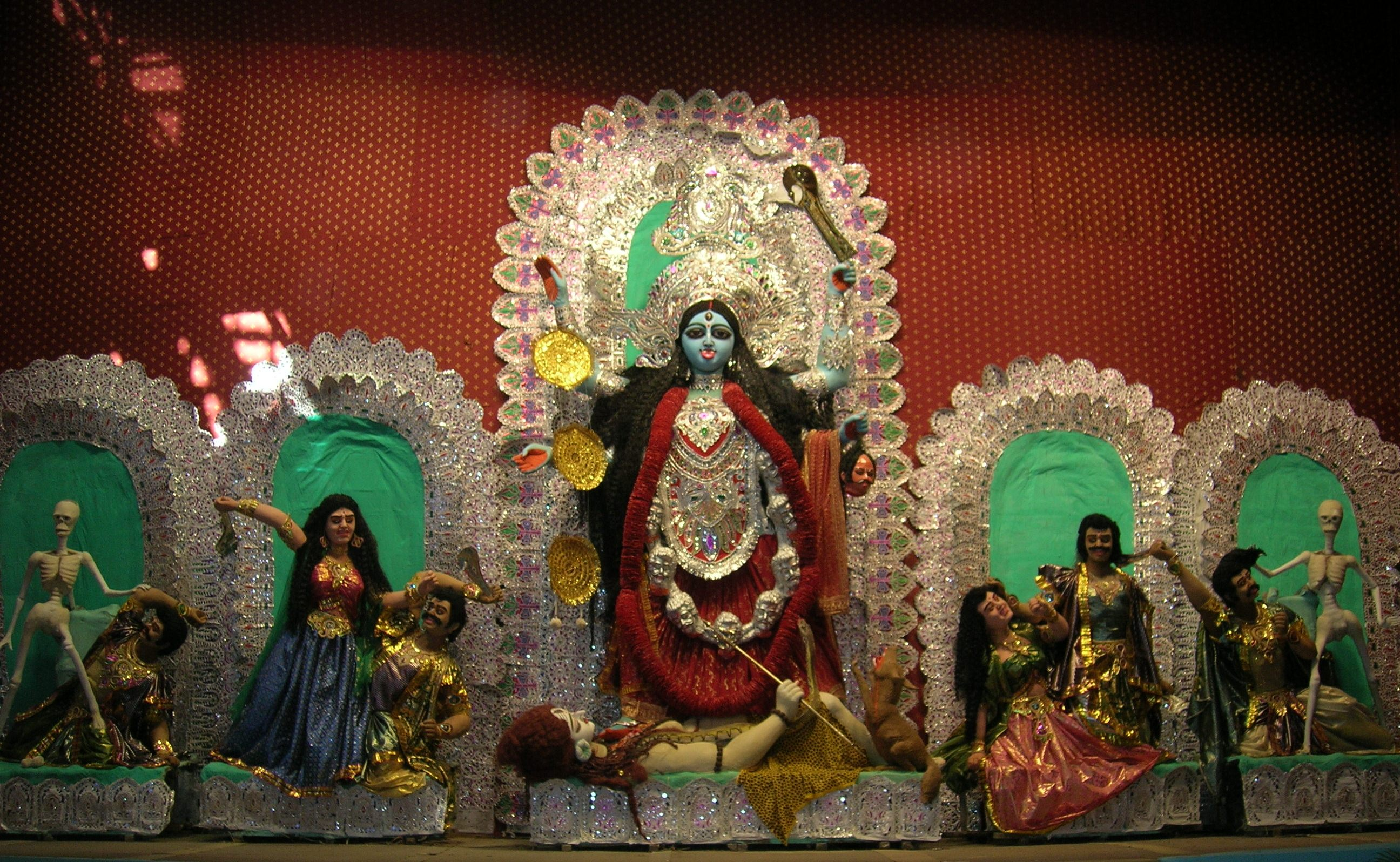
The goddess Kālī flanked by Ḍākinī and Yoginī

A chapter detailing the mode of worship of the goddess Kubjikā contained in the Agni Purāṇa instructs that the goddesses "Ḍākinī, Rākinī, Kākinī, Śākinī, and Yakṣiṇī should be worshipped in the six directions (coming) from the north-west."

In Tantric literature, Ḍākinī the goddess is usually associated with the saptadhātus (the seven primary constituent elements of the human body) or the six chakras. The Kubjikāmata Tantra for instance enumerates seven yoginī goddesses (Kusumamālinī, Yakṣiṇī, Śaṅkhinī, Kākinī, Lākinī, Rākinī, and Ḍākinī) to whom the ritual practitioner symbolically offers his semen, bones, marrow, fat, flesh, blood and skin, respectively. A nearly identical listing of goddesses can be found in a later text belonging to the same tradition, the Śrīmatottara Tantra: here, the names listed are Dākinī, Rākinī, Lākinī, Kākinī, Śākinī, Hākinī, Yākinī and Kusumā. Another chapter in the Kubjikāmata Tantra lists two sequences of six goddesses, assigned to each of the six chakras: the first denotes the creative "northern course" of the six chakras, from the ājñā down to the ādhāra, while the latter – comprising Ḍākinī, Rākinī, Lākinī, Kākinī, Śākinī and Hākinī – denotes the destructive "southern course", in reverse order.

Later Tantric texts such as the Rudrayāmala Tantra identify Ḍākinī, Rākinī, Lākinī, Kākinī, Śākinī and Hākinī with the six chakras, the dhātus and the five elements plus the mind. This work associates Ḍākinī with the mūlādhāra chakra, Rākinī with svādhiṣṭhāna, Lākinī with maṇipūra, Kākinī with anāhata, Śākinī with viśuddhi, and Hākinī with ājñā. The Śrīmatottara Tantra places Kusumamāla (absent in the Rudrayāmala Tantra) at the feet, while other texts place a figure named Yākinī at the level of the sahasrāra.

== In Buddhism ==
=== As flesh-eaters ===
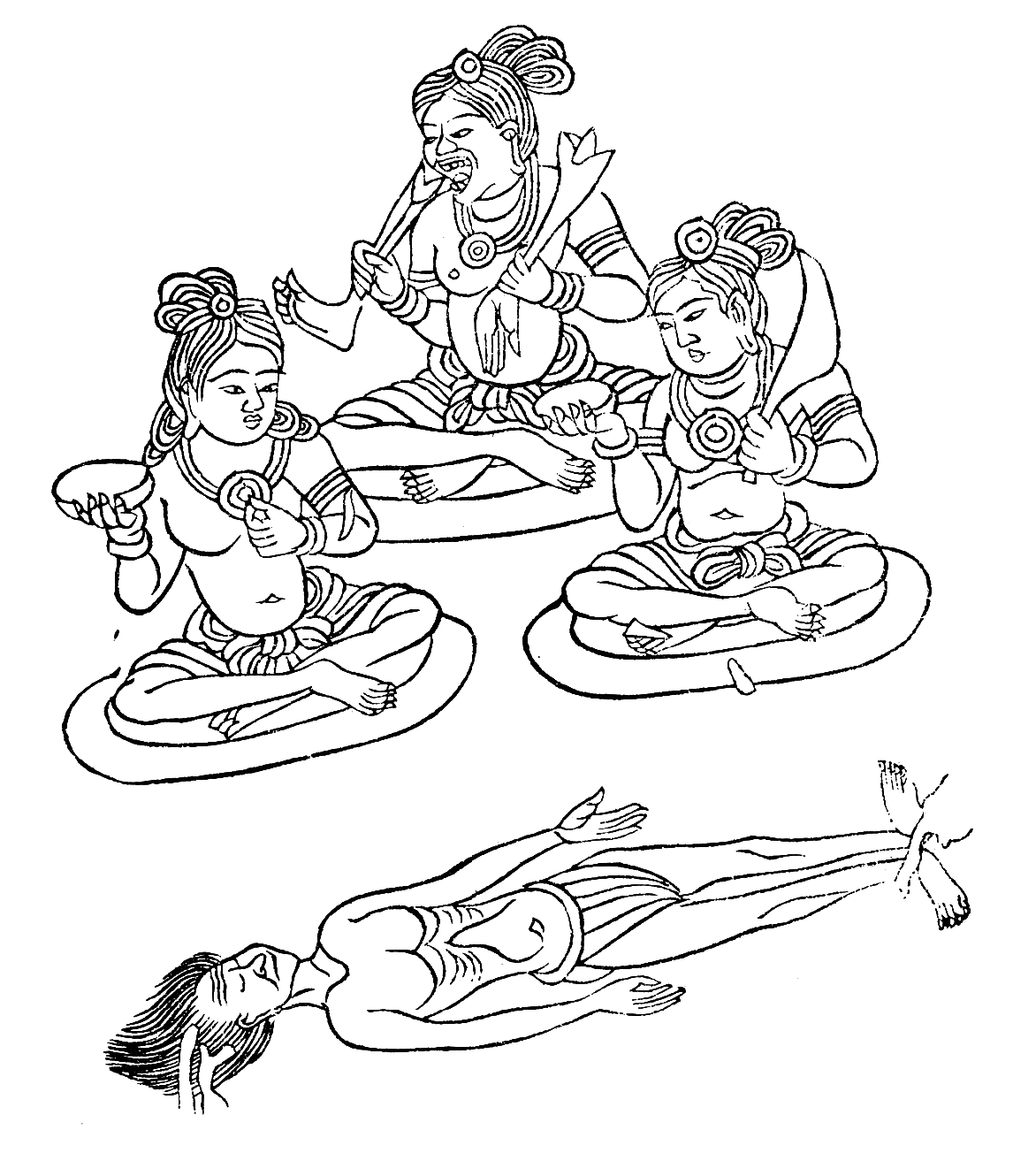
Ḍākinīs with a human corpse. Detail of Womb Realm (Garbhakoṣadhātu) Mandala

In a chapter criticizing meat-eating in the Laṅkāvatāra Sūtra, Gautama Buddha refers to dākas and ḍākinīs – described as "terrible eaters of human flesh" – as the offspring of the carnivorous King Kalmaśapada ("Spotted Feet"), who was born after a human king had mated with a lioness.

In East Asian Buddhism, the ḍākinīs are mainly known via the story of their subjugation by the wrathful deity Mahākāla found in a commentary on the Mahāvairocana Tantra (also known as the Vairocanābhisaṃbodhi Sūtra) by the Tang dynasty monk Yi Xing. According to the story, the buddha Vairocana, wishing to stop the ḍākinīs from preying on humans, took the form of Mahākāla, summoned the ḍākinīs before him, and then swallowed them all, declaring that he would release them on the condition that they cease devouring human flesh. When the ḍākinīs complained that this would lead them to starvation, Mahākāla as a concession allowed them to consume the vital essence of deceased humans known as 'human yellow' (人黄, pinyin: rénhuáng, Japanese: jin'ō / ninnō) – an elusive substance (often described as five, six, seven, or ten grains resembling grains of millet, dewdrops or white jade) believed to be found either inside a person's liver, heart or at the top of the head – instead, teaching them a mantra enabling them to know of a person's impending death six months in advance so that they could obtain it before other demons, who also coveted the substance as it conferred various magical powers to the consumer.

[The ḍākinīs'] chief was the yakṣa Maheśvara, who worldly people say is the ultimate [god]. They were subject to Mahākāla, the god called the "Great Black One" (大黑). Vairocana, employing the method of Trailokyavijaya and wanting to exterminate them, transformed himself into Mahākāla, exceeding him in an immeasurable manifestation. His body smeared with ashes in a desolate place, he summoned with his magical art all the ḍākinīs, who had all of the magical powers [such as] flying, walking on water and being completely unhindered. He upbraided them, saying: "Since you alone always devour people, now I will eat you!" Then he swallowed them, but did not allow them to die. Once they have submitted, he released them, completely forbidding them to [eat] flesh. They spoke to the Buddha, saying, "We presently eat flesh to survive. How can we sustain ourselves now?" The Buddha said, "I will permit you to eat the hearts of dead people." They said, "When a man is about to die, the māhāyakṣas and so forth know that his life is exhausted, and they race there to eat him, so how can we get [our share]?" The Buddha said, "I will teach you the mantra procedures and mudrās. You will be able to know six months before someone dies, and knowing this, you should protect him with this method, so he will not fear being injured. When his life has expired, then you can seize and eat [his heart]." In this way, they were gradually induced to embark upon the [Buddhist] path.

Other texts meanwhile assign the taming of the ḍākinīs to other figures such as Vajrapāṇi or the Wisdom King Acala (Fudō Myōō in Japanese). Indeed, in Japanese esoteric Buddhism Acala is believed to have the power to extend the lifespan of his devotees and was thus invoked in certain life-prolonging rituals against soul-stealing demons such as ḍākinīs. Like Mahākāla, Acala is interpreted in the Japanese tradition as a wrathful avatar of Vairocana, with some texts even identifying Mahākāla as Acala's "trace" (suijaku) or manifestation.

A dictionary compiled by the Tang dynasty monk Huilin (慧琳) titled The Sound and Meaning of All Sūtras (Chinese: 一切經音義, pinyin: Yīqièjīng yīnyì) defines ḍākinīs (荼抧尼) as demonesses who bewitch people and have sexual relationships with them.

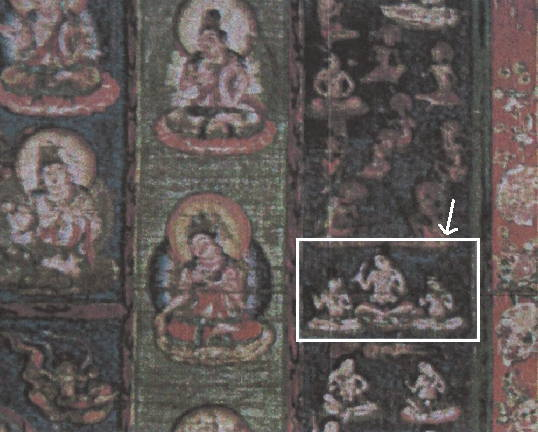
The ḍākinīs in the Womb Realm Mandala

=== In Japanese Buddhism ===
==== Emergence and development of cult ====
The ḍākinī imagery arrived in Japan via Kūkai's introduction of Tangmi (East Asian esoteric Buddhism) to the country in the beginning of the 9th century (early Heian period) in the form of the Shingon school. The Womb Realm (Garbhakoṣadhātu) Mandala, one of the two main mandalas of Shingon Buddhism, depicts three ḍākinīs in the southern (right-hand side) part of the mandala's Outer Vajra section (外金剛部院, gekongōbu-in) in the court of Yama (Enmaten in Japanese), next to the Saptamātṛkās and other similar deities. The figures are half-naked and seated on circular mats next to a human corpse. One of the ḍākinīs is shown devouring a human arm and a leg; the other two hold skulls (kapāla) in their right hands, and one holds a chopper in her left hand. All in all, the ḍākinīs represented in this mandala are more akin to the demonesses of Hindu and early Buddhist texts and iconography than the female personifications of enlightenment found in Tibetan Buddhism.

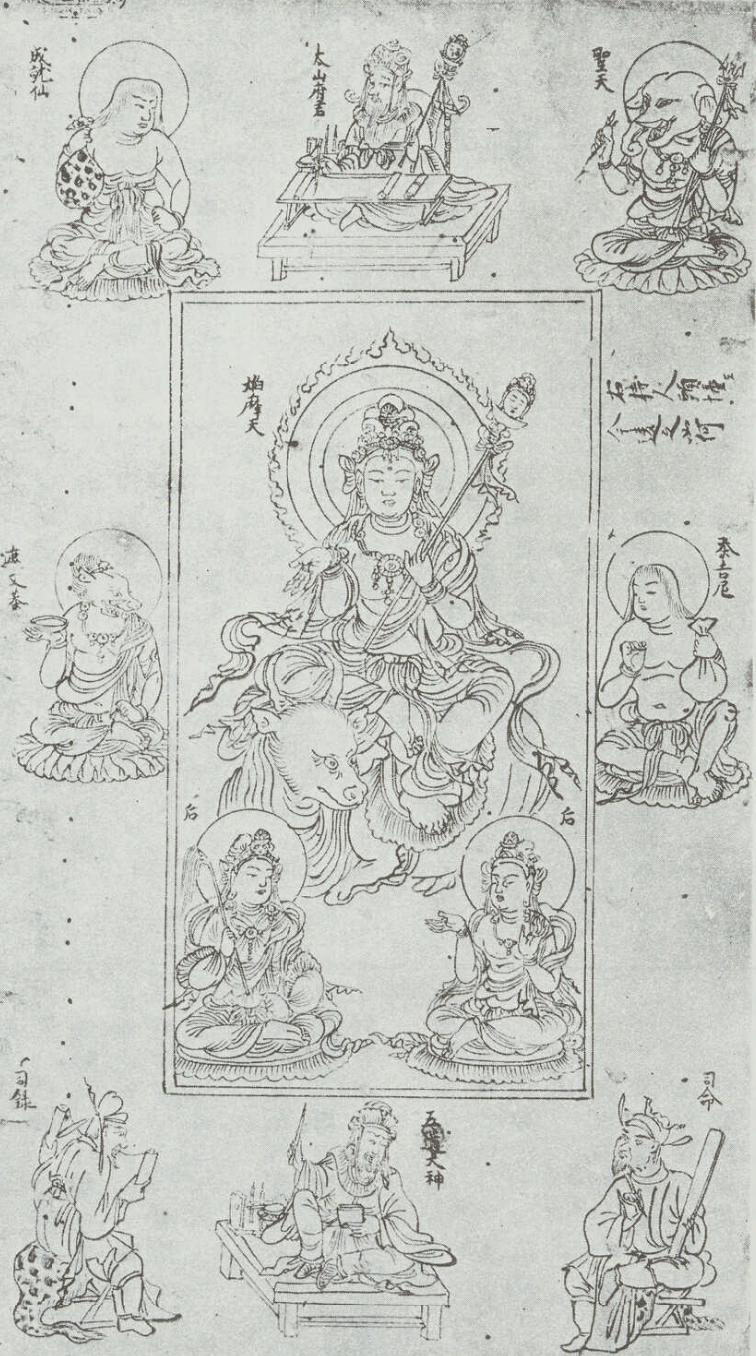
Mandala of Enmaten (Yama), from the Besson Zakki (別尊雑記), a late Heian-early Kamakura period Japanese compendium of Buddhist iconography. A half-naked ḍākinī (荼吉尼) figure holding a sack or bag is depicted to the right of Enmaten and his two consorts.

The ḍākinīs were, as per their placement in the Womb Realm Mandala, originally revered as part of Yama's (Enmaten's) retinue, mainly figuring in rituals centered around the deity. A ḍākinī (not yet the medieval Dakiniten), depicted as a long-haired woman holding a bag, also appears in the Enmaten mandalas of the late Heian period as one of the god's attendants. It was after the Insei period of the late 11th to mid-12th century, during which Japan was effectively under the rule of retired ("cloistered") emperors, that a cult centered around the deified ḍākinī as a single goddess named 'Dakiniten' emerged independent of the Enmaten ritual. As the cult of Dakiniten flourished, its rite became famous for being particularly effective for obtaining worldly benefits and was thus especially attractive to the politically ambitious; at the same time, however, the ritual was viewed with suspicion within some circles as a dangerous, "heterodox" (外法, gehō) practice due to its supposed subversive, black magical aspects.

It is difficult to trace the exact origins of the Japanese Dakiniten cult. While a number of medieval texts claim the ritual's lineage started with eminent esoteric masters such as Amoghavajra or Vajrabodhi, the lineage may more plausibly be traced back to 10th century Shingon monks such as the Jingo-ji priest Kengyō (鑒教) or the Tō-ji abbot Kanshuku (観宿, fl. 926–930). Although one legend claims that Saichō, the founder of the Tendai school, brought with him Dakiniten ritual texts from China which he then buried at Mount Hiei, there is actually no historical proof that he or any of the other monks who went to China to study esoteric Buddhism – Kūkai, Jōgyō, Engyō, Ennin, Eun, Enchin and Shuei – brought home any such texts with them, suggesting that the Dakiniten rite developed in Japan well after their time.

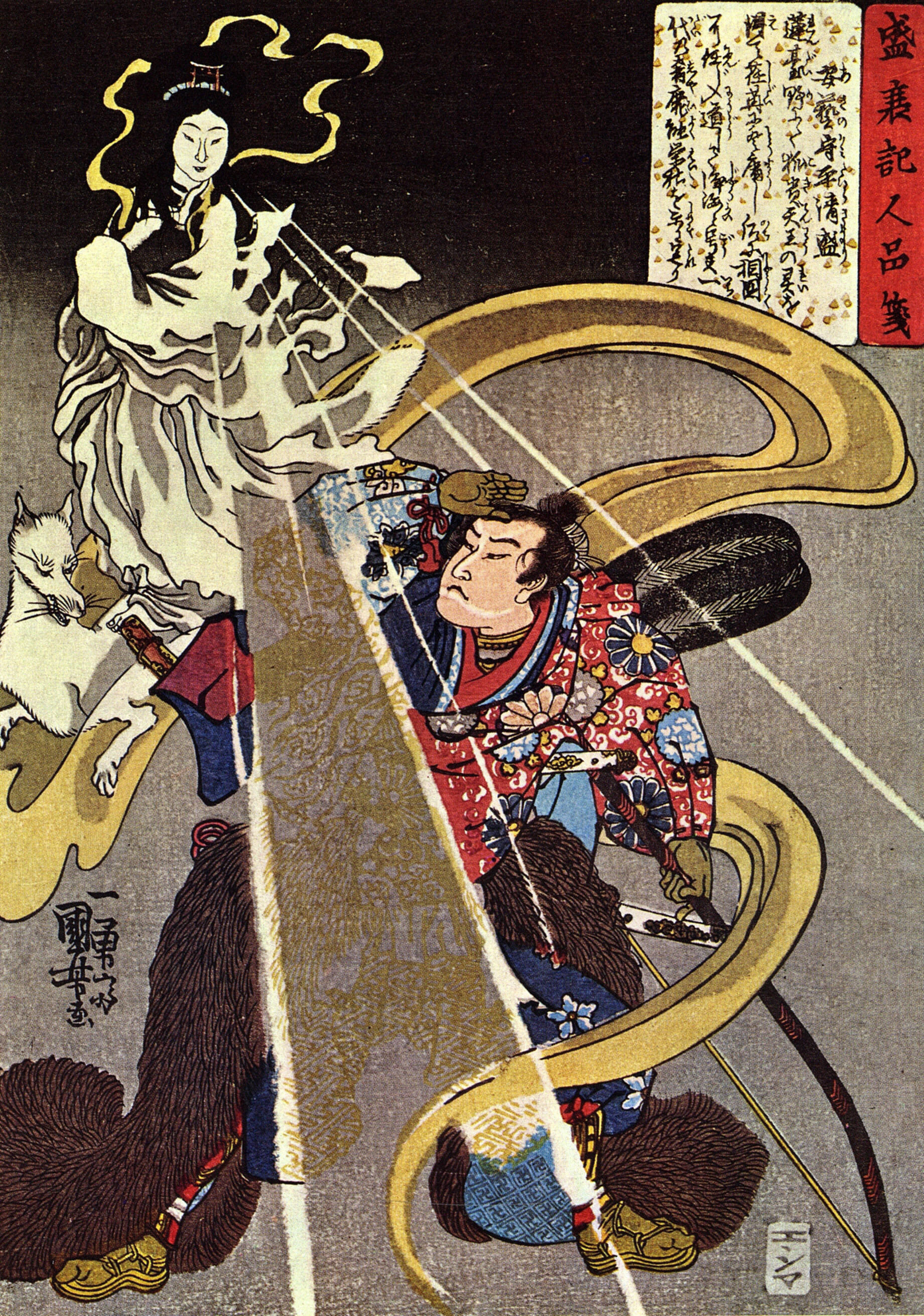
Taira no Kiyomori encounters the fox goddess Kiko Tennō (Dakiniten), by Utagawa Kuniyoshi

The rapid rise of certain notable figures to prominence, as well as their decline, have been popularly attributed to Dakiniten. A certain anecdote regarding the military leader Taira no Kiyomori found in the Genpei Jōsuiki (one of a number of variants of the Heike Monogatari) claims that Kiyomori once shot an arrow at a fox during a hunt. The fox then transformed into a woman who promised to grant Kiyomori whatever he wanted in exchange for her life. Kiyomori, realizing this woman is none other than the goddess Kiko Tennō (貴狐天王, lit. "Venerable Fox Deva-King", i.e. Dakiniten), spared her life. He subsequently became a devotee of the goddess, despite his awareness that the benefits obtained through the Dakiniten rite (吒天の法, Daten no hō) would not be passed on to his progeny. The story thus attributes both Kiyomori's rise in power and the subsequent fall of his clan to his performance of the Dakiniten ritual.

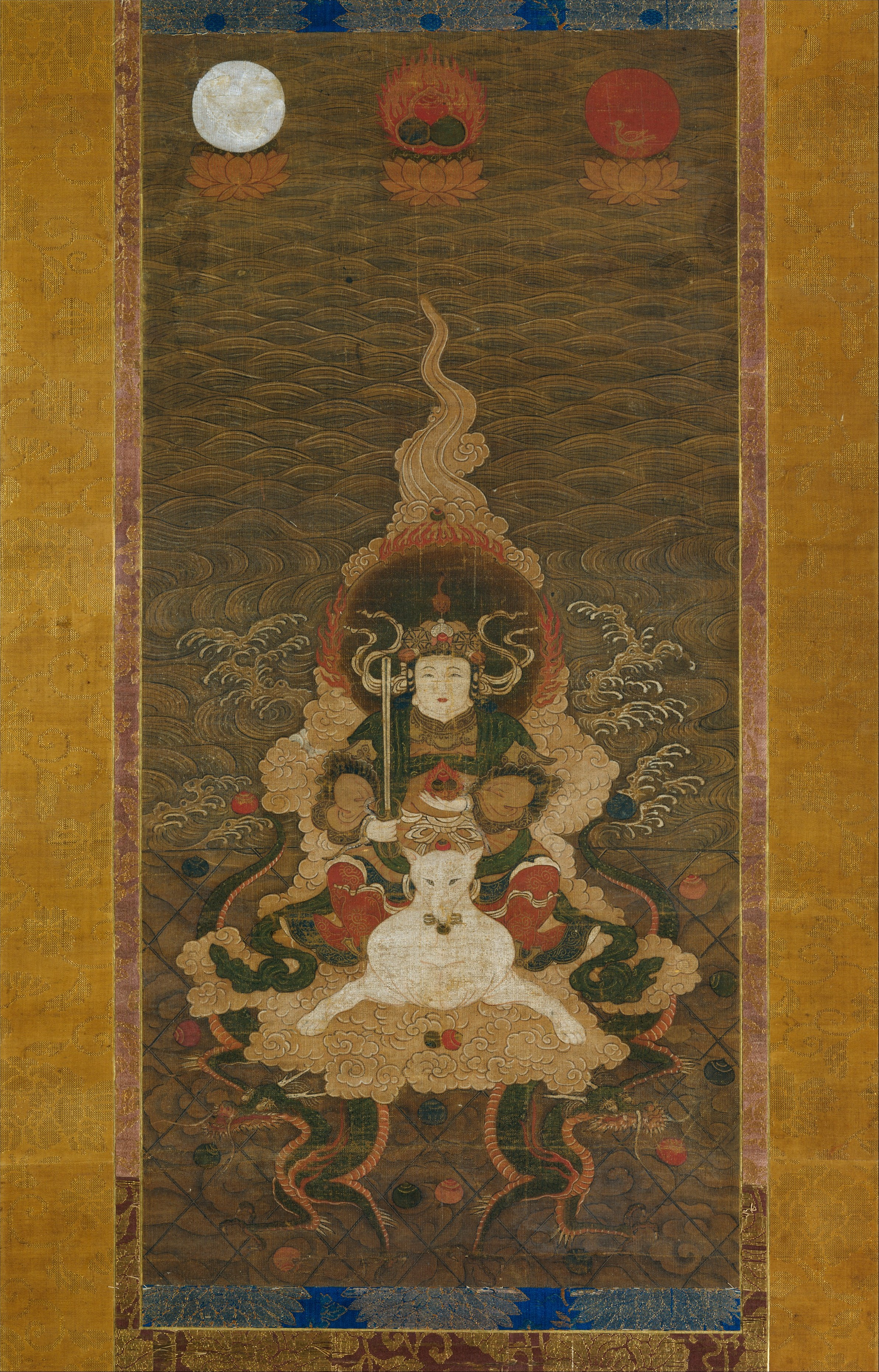
Nanboku-chō period painting of Dakiniten riding a white fox, carrying a sword and a wish-granting jewel (cintāmaṇi)

According to the Kamakura period work Kokon Chomonjū, the late Heian period nobleman Fujiwara no Tadazane commissioned the performance of the Dakiniten rite for seven days as he was about to be sent into exile. At the end of that period, a fox came to eat his offering, a rice cake. He then later had a dream in which he was visited by a beautiful young woman. When she was getting ready to leave, he grasped her hair to hold her back, at which he woke up finding himself holding a fox's tail in his hands. The next day, instead of being exiled, he was promoted to a high rank. Attributing this turn of events to Dakiniten, Tadazane in thanksgiving worshiped the fox tail as a symbol of the deity.

Other people claimed to have attained positions of authority due to their devotion to Dakiniten include the monk Ningai (951–1046), the founder of the Ono branch (小野流, Ono-ryū) of Shingon, and the Shingon Risshū monk Monkan (1278–1357), a close aide of Emperor Go-Daigo whose name became linked to the infamous Tachikawa branch (Tachikawa-ryū). Monkan's enemies in particular painted him in a negative light by emphasizing the dubious nature of the rites he performed; one notable rival, Yūkai, accused him of "making offerings to the ḍākinīs and conjuring dragons while he is reporting to the throne." The Tendai monk Kōshū (1276–1350), in his work Keiran Shūyōshū (渓嵐拾葉集, "Collected Leaves from Hazy Valleys"), wavers in his judgment of the Dakiniten rite: on the one hand, he comments that "he who worships animals is worthy of being a master. He who worships a fox is worthy of becoming a king." On the other hand, he warns his readers about the dangers of the Dakiniten cult.

==== Dakiniten and Inari ====
Dakiniten's cult flourished mainly via the network of Inari worship and vice versa; the former, because of her association with the fox (kitsune), became closely linked with the latter, as foxes were seen as the messengers of the Inari deity. Dakiniten came to be identified with the native agricultural kami Ukanomitama, Toyouke, and Ukemochi (all of whom were themselves conflated both with the god of Inari and with each other), with her iconography probably being informed by these goddesses. A late Kamakura period text called the Inari-ki (稲荷記, "Record of Inari") links the five peaks of Mount Inari with various divinities and Buddhist figures: the eastern peak corresponds with Dakiniten, who is associated with the Wisdom King Yamāntaka (Daiitoku) and the kami Amaterasu, the central peak to Shinkoō (辰狐王, lit. "Dragon-Fox / Astral Fox King"; a name also applied to Dakiniten's vulpine mount who was eventually conflated with the goddess herself) and the buddha Amitabha, the western peak to Benzaiten and Rāgarāja (Aizen), the southern peak to Trailokyavijaya (Gōzanze), Niu Myōjin and Hārītī (Kariteimo), and the northern peak to Acala (Fudō). When reckoned as a separate figure, the Inari deity (Inari Myōjin) may even be depicted among Dakiniten's retinue as an old man bearing on his shoulder a pole with sheaves of rice on each end.

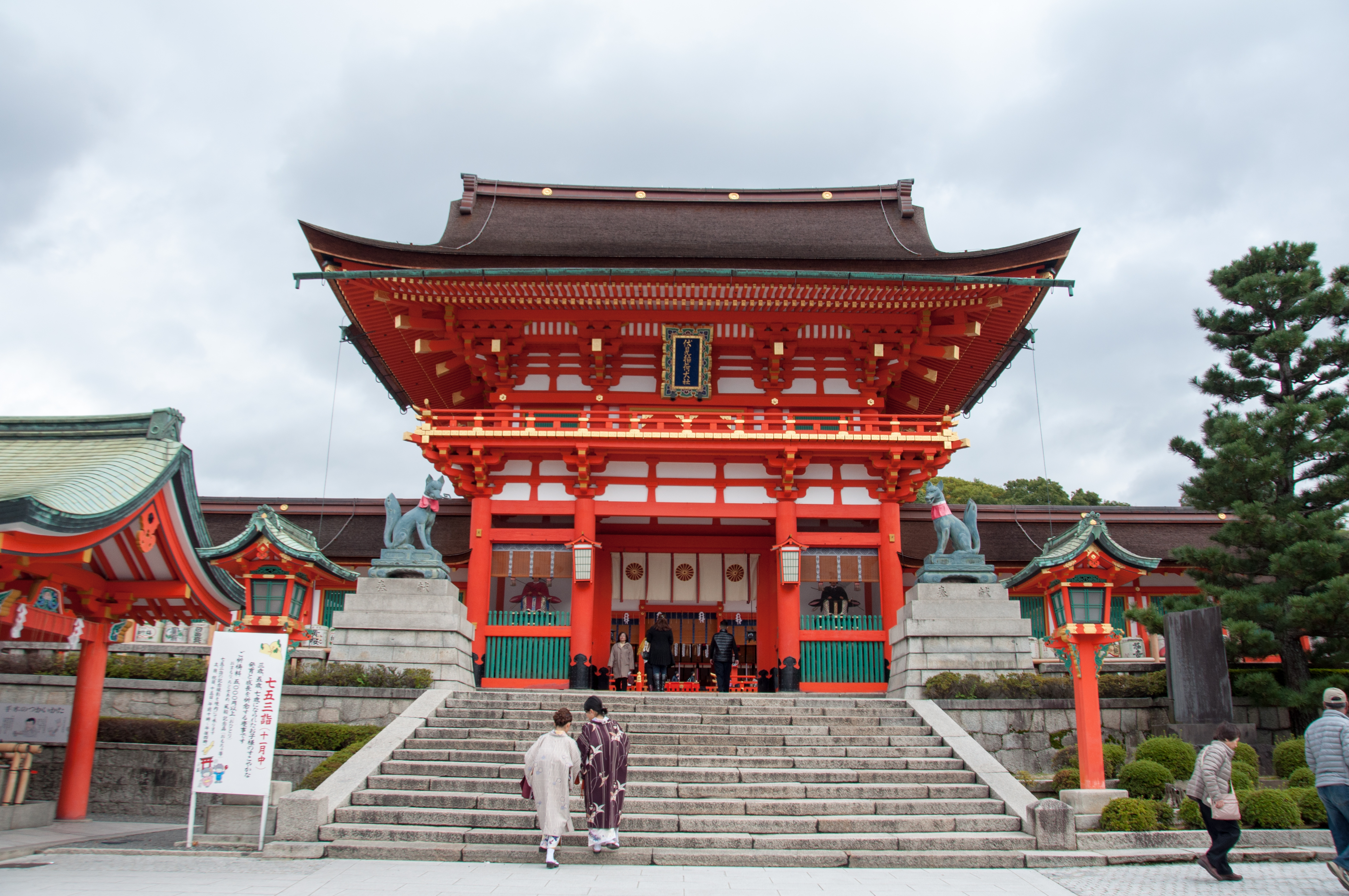
Due to her association with foxes, the cult of Dakiniten was assimilated into that of the agricultural deity Inari. (pictured: Fushimi Inari Shrine in Kyoto)

The assimilation of Dakiniten and Inari (or rather, Ukanomitama) can also be observed in the origin story of the Dakiniten Hall at Shinnyo-dō in Kyoto. The story relates that a monk who was a worshiper of Dakiniten had just finished reciting the 600-fascicle Mahāprajñāpāramitā Sūtra when a white fox holding a jewel (cintāmaṇi) in its mouth appeared on the altar. The fox then transformed into a youth, who declared that he was the deity Ukanomitama and that his jewel grants all wishes.

In popular religion, Dakiniten was also identified with a fox goddess worshiped at Mount Inari known variously as Akomachi (阿小町), Tōme (専女), or Myōbu (命婦). This deity (commonly regarded as an attendant of the god of Inari) was revered as a patron of love and matchmaking; a short liturgical text to Akomachi preserved at Kōzan-ji is titled Dakini no saimon (荼枳尼祭文). In its section on the Inari deity, the Nanboku-chō period anthology Shintōshū recounts a tradition found in "a certain person's diary" which identifies the deity of the Upper Shrine (上社, kami no yashiro) of Inari (Note: The goddess Ōmiyanome (claimed in the Kogo Shūi to be a daughter of the god Futodama) is currently considered to be the deity of the Upper Inari Shrine located on Mount Inari's peak Ichinomine (一ノ峰), although the actual shrine on the summit simply dubs the deity 'Suehiro Ōkami' (末広大神).) as the "Dragon / Astral Fox" (辰狐, Shinko) Myōbu, who is said to be a manifestation of the bodhisattva Mañjuśrī. The work then further identifies this Shinko(ō) Bosatsu (辰狐(王)菩薩, "Dragon / Astral Fox (King) Bodhisattva", i.e. Dakiniten) as the incarnation of Vairocana, Mañjuśrī, Vaiśravaṇa and Cintāmaṇicakra (Nyoirin Kannon).

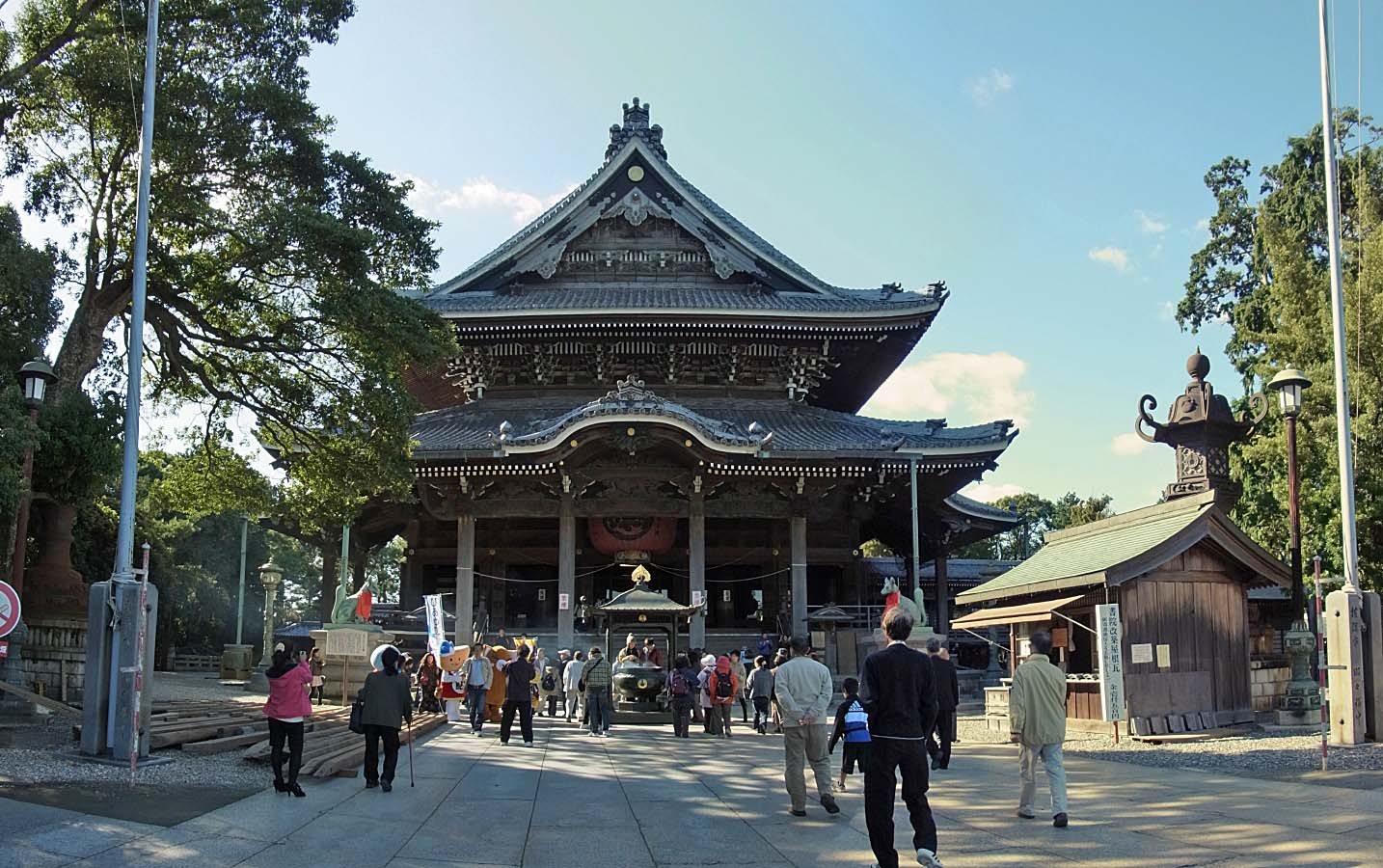
Myōgon-ji, a Sōtō Zen temple in Toyokawa, Aichi Prefecture famous as a center of Dakiniten worship under the name 'Toyokawa Inari' (豊川稲荷)

The cult of Dakiniten and that of Inari became inextricably fused that the name 'Inari' was even applied to places of Dakiniten worship, such as Toyokawa Inari (Myōgon-ji), a Sōtō Zen temple in Toyokawa, Aichi Prefecture, where the goddess known as Toyokawa Dakini Shinten (豊川吒枳尼真天) is venerated as the guardian deity (chinju) of the temple. Legend claims that the Dakiniten of Toyokawa originally appeared to Kangan Giin (1217–1300), a disciple of Dōgen (the founder of the Japanese Sōtō school), during his return from China in 1267. In the vision, he was given a mantra by Dakiniten, who vowed to become his protector. An image based on this apparition attributed to Giin, showing the goddess on a white fox and carrying rice sheaves on a pole on her right shoulder while holding a cintāmaṇi in her left hand, was eventually transmitted to Giin's sixth generation disciple, Tōkai Gieki (1412–1497), who enshrined it at the temple he founded.

Another notable 'Inari' sanctuary is the Nichiren-shū temple Myōkyō-ji – popularly known as Saijō Inari (最上稲荷) – in Okayama, Okayama Prefecture, notable for its goddess Saijōikyōō Daibosatsu (最上位経王大菩薩, lit. "Great Bodhisattva of the Supreme King of Sūtras" – a reference to the Lotus Sūtra), who is portrayed as riding a white fox while bearing a pole laden with rice sheaves on her left shoulder and wielding a scythe on her right hand. This image reflects the two currents constituting the Inari tradition: the agricultural deity of Mount Inari and the esoteric Buddhist deity Dakiniten.

==== Imperial enthronement ceremony ====
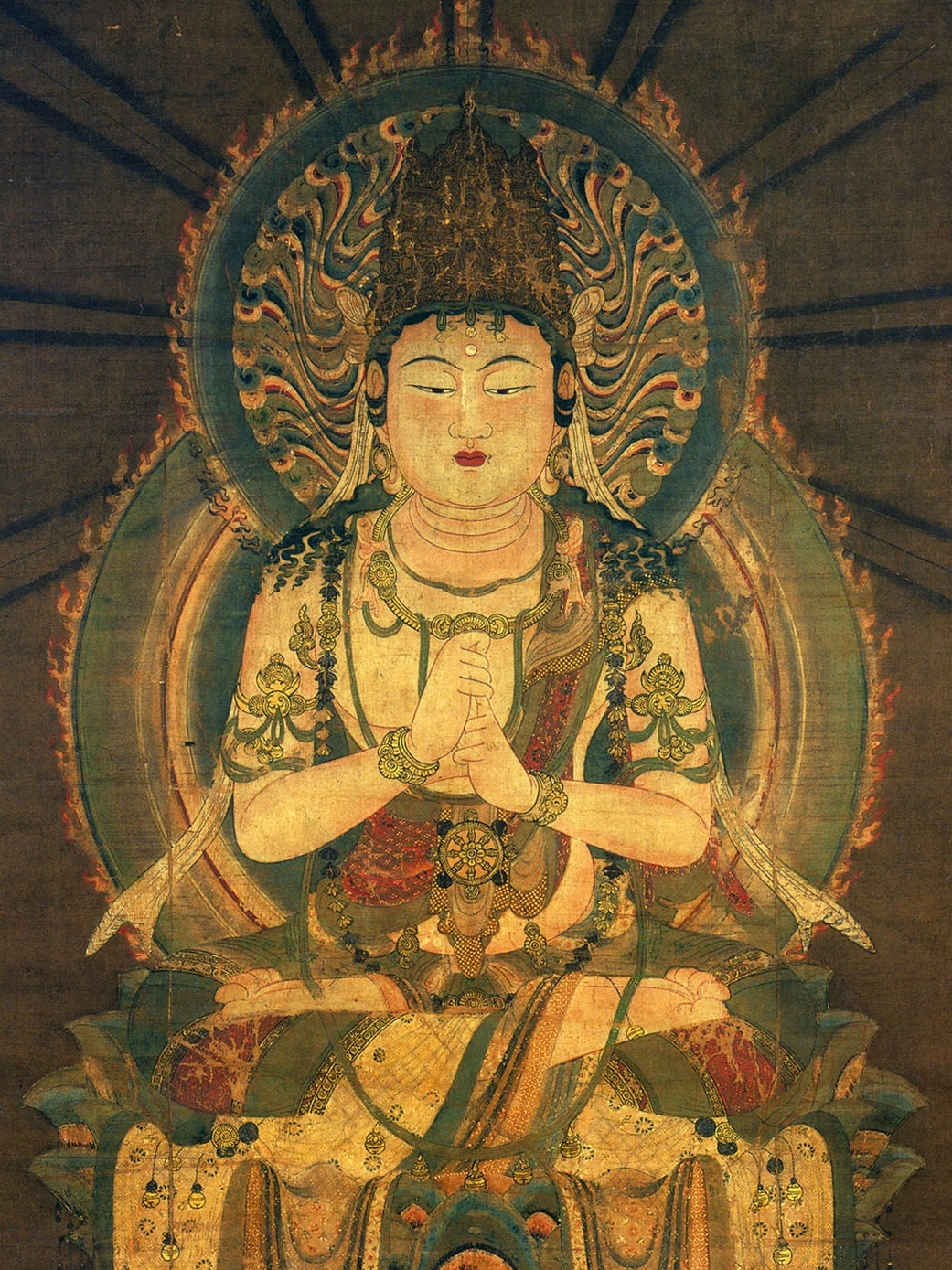
The buddha Vairocana of the Diamond Realm (Vajradhātu) making the 'wisdom fist' mudra (智拳印, chiken-in)

From the Middle Ages up until the Meiji period, the enthronement ceremony of the Japanese emperor featured Buddhist elements. One such ritual performed during the emperor's accession was the sokui kanjō (即位灌頂, "Abhiṣeka of Enthronement"), in which various mudras and mantras were ritually transmitted to and performed by the new emperor. The central deity (honzon) in this rite was Dakiniten, who is considered to be both the incarnation of the buddha Vairocana (Dainichi Nyorai) and the 'origin' (honji) of the sun goddess Amaterasu, the mythical ancestor of the imperial line; indeed, the emperor, upon ascending the throne, was said to have formed the 'wisdom fist' mudra associated with Vairocana in the Diamond Realm while reciting Dakiniten's mantra. A text from 1324, the Bikisho (鼻帰書, "Record of Returning to Origins"), also reports that when the ritual was performed in the imperial palace, two fox figurines – one gold and one silver – were placed to the left and right of the altar, and the new ruler was consecrated through an aspersion with water from "the four oceans". A medieval text stresses the rite's importance thus: "If he does not receive this ritual, the ruler's power is light and it cannot hold the four oceans. This is why this ritual is not limited to the king; monks of the various temples and profanes, too, when they perform it, can obtain a high rank and be perfectly free."

The origins of sokui kanjō are shrouded in mystery; one tradition claims that a disciple of Ningai, Seison (成尊, 1012–1074), first conducted it during the accession of Emperor Go-Sanjō in 1068. Performance of the rite, however, eventually became the prerogative of Fujiwara regents, who transmitted the mantras to the new emperor during the ceremony. Indeed, a medieval legend justifies this custom by claiming that it started with the founding ancestor of the Fujiwara clan, Nakatomi (Fujiwara) no Kamatari, who was abducted in his youth by a she-fox (an avatar of Amaterasu). The fox taught Kamatari the enthronement rites and gave him a sickle (kama) with which he defeated his enemy Soga no Iruka. One text even identifies Kamatari and Daten (Dakiniten) as manifestations of Amaterasu.

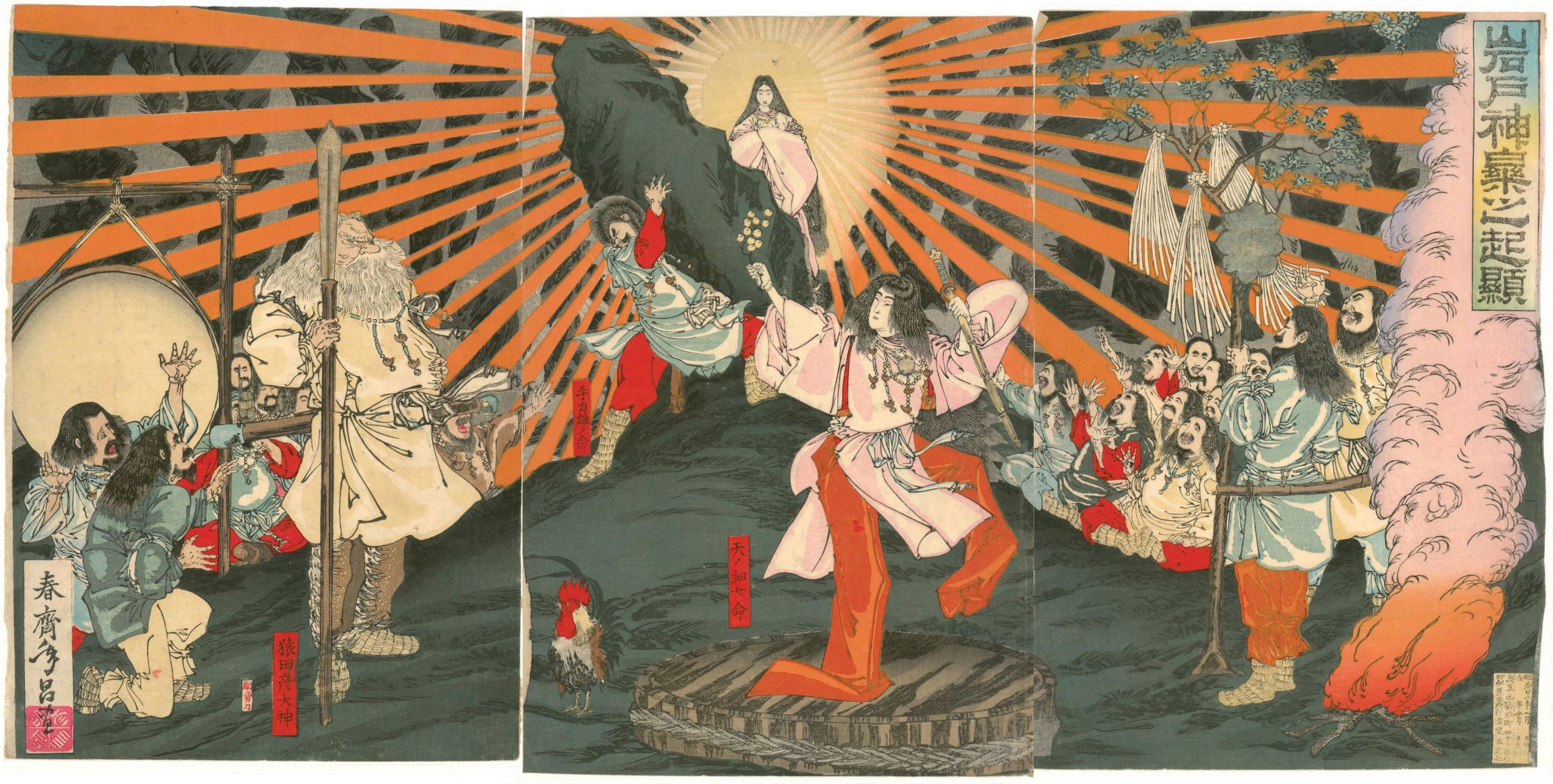
Amaterasu emerges from the Heavenly Rock Cave (Shunsai Toshimasa, 1889)

The connection between the fox, Dakiniten, and Amaterasu can also be seen in the Keiran Shūyōshū, which features the following retelling of the myth of Amaterasu's hiding:

Question: What was the appearance of Amaterasu when she was hiding in the Rock-Cave of Heaven?

Answer: Since Amaterasu is the sun deity, she had the appearance of the sun-disc. Another tradition says: When Amaterasu retired into the Rock-Cave of Heaven after her descent from Heaven (sic), she took on the appearance of a dragon-fox (shinko). Uniquely among all animals, the dragon-fox is a kami that emits light from its body; this is the reason why she took on this appearance.

Question: Why does the dragon-fox emit light?

Answer: The dragon-fox is an expedient body of Nyoirin Kannon. It takes the wish-fulfilling gem as its body, and is therefore called King Cintāmaṇi. ... Further, one tradition says that one becomes a king by revering the dragon-fox because the dragon-fox is an expedient body of Amaterasu.

Commenting on the sokui kanjō, Bernard Faure writes:

under the name "Fox King," Dakiniten became a manifestation of the sun goddess Amaterasu, with whom the new emperor united during the enthronement ritual. [...] The Buddhist ritual allowed the ruler to symbolically cross over the limits separating the human and animal realms to harness the wild and properly superhuman energy of the "infrahuman" world, so as to gain full control of the human sphere.

Another type of secret enthronement ritual centered on Dakiniten took place on the Outer Shrine of Ise (Gekū) and was performed every morning and evening by the shrine's young female attendants or kora (子良 or 狐良 – 狐 being the character for 'fox') when they presented their daily offerings to the deity. There are two traditions related to its origins, one claiming that it goes back to Amaterasu herself through her priestess Yamatohime, the other that it originated with Kūkai. In this way, the kora, and through them Amaterasu, came to be identified with Dakiniten. According to the Bikisho: "Based on this [ancient practice of worshiping animals with special powers] at these [Ise] shrines, the shrine maidens (kora) perform the Ritual of the Astral Fox after presenting divine food. Its meaning is to show that the promise made in ancient times has not been forgotten. Therefore, the emperors, who are the descendants of the great deity [of Ise], are initiated in this method as part of their enthronement."

==== Connection with foxes ====
Although Dakini-ten was said to be a powerful Buddhist deity, the images and stories surrounding it in Japan in both medieval and modern times are drawn from local kitsune mythology. The modern folk belief, often printed in Japanese books about religion, is that the fox image was a substitute for the Indian jackal, but the black jackal and other black animals are associated with Kali.

In the early modern period, the ḍākinī rite devolved into various spells called Dakini-ten, Atago Gongen. Those who felt wronged in their village could go to a corrupt yamabushi who practiced black magic, and get him to trap a kitsune and cause it to possess a third party. Reports of possession became especially common in the Edo and Meiji periods. For details, see kitsunetsuki.

==== Mantra ====
Toyokawa Dakini Shinten (豊川吒枳尼真天)

The Mahāvairocana Tantra assigns the following mantra to the ḍākinīs:

Sanskrit	Chinese characters
Namaḥ samanta-buddhānāṃ hrīḥ haḥ	南麼 三曼多 勃馱喃_{(一)} 訶_{(去)}唎_{(二合)}訶_{(上)}

The following mantra meanwhile is associated with Toyokawa Inari and is said to have been revealed by Dakiniten to Kangan Giin:

Chinese characters	Japanese (romanized)
唵尸羅婆陀尼黎吽娑婆訶	On shira batta niri un sowaka

This mantra is traditionally interpreted as meaning: "When this spell is chanted, the faith in me reaches everywhere, and by the true power of the Buddhist precepts, evil and misfortune will be abolished and luck and wisdom attained; suffering removed and comfort achieved, and pain transformed into delight."

=== In Tibetan Buddhism ===
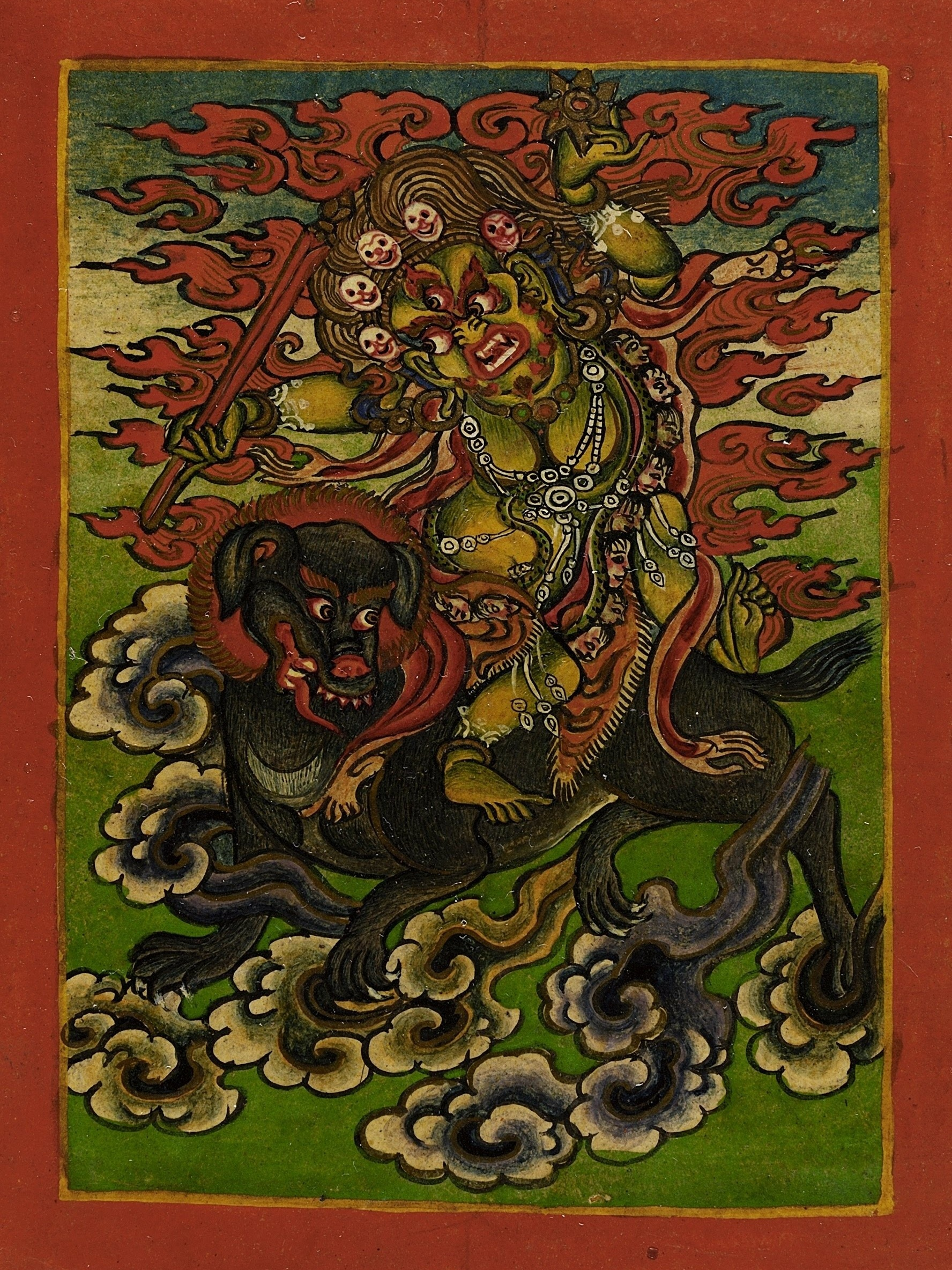
Dakini on a Gray Dog, Nyingmapa Buddhist or Bon Ritual Card; 18th- or 19th-century, watercolor on paper, 14 × 11 cm, Los Angeles County Museum of Art

Although ḍākinī figures appear in Hinduism and Bon, ḍākinīs occur most notably in Vajrayana Buddhism and especially Tibetan Buddhism. The khandroma, generally of volatile or wrathful temperament, acts somewhat as spiritual muse for spiritual practice. Dakinis are energetic beings in female form, evocative of the movement of energy in space. In this context, the sky or space indicates śūnyatā, the insubstantiality of all phenomena, which is, at the same time, the pure potentiality for all possible manifestations.

The ḍākinī appears in a Vajrayana formulation of the Buddhist refuge formula known as the Three Roots. Sometimes she appears as the dharmapala, alongside a guru and yidam.

The dakini, in her various guises, serves as each of the Three Roots. She may be a human guru, a vajra master who transmits the Vajrayana teachings to her disciples and joins them in samaya commitments. The wisdom dakini may be a yidam, a meditational deity; female deity yogas such as Vajrayogini are common in Tibetan Buddhism. Or she may be a protector; the wisdom dakinis have special power and responsibility to protect the integrity of oral transmissions."

An archetypal ḍākinī in Tibetan Buddhism is Yeshe Tsogyal, consort of Padmasambhava.

==== Classes ====
Judith Simmer-Brown, based on teachings she received from Tibetan lamas, identifies four main classes of ḍākinī. These follow the twilight language tradition of esoteric Buddhism in referring to secret, inner, outer and outer-outer classes of ḍākinīs.

1. The secret class of ḍākinī is prajnaparamita (Tibetan yum chenmo), the empty nature of reality according to Mahayana doctrine.
2. The inner class of ḍākinī is the ḍākinī of the mandala, a meditational deity (Tibetan:yidam) and fully enlightened Buddha who helps the practitioner recognise their own Buddhahood.
3. The outer ḍākinī is the physical form of the ḍākinī, attained through completion stage tantra practices such as the Six Yogas of Naropa that work with the subtle winds of the subtle body so that the practitioner's body is compatible with an enlightened mind.
4. The outer-outer ḍākinī is a ḍākinī in human form. She is a yogini in her own right but may also be a karmamudrā, or consort, of a yogi or mahasiddha.

Dakinis can also be classified according to the Trikaya, or three bodies of buddhahood.

1. The Dharmakāya ḍākinī, which is Samantabhadrī, represents the dharmadhatu where all phenomena appear.
2. The Sambhogakāya ḍākinīs are the yidams used as meditational deities for tantric practice.
3. The Nirmanakāya ḍākinīs are human women born with special potentialities; these are realized yoginis, consorts of gurus, or even all women in general as they may be classified into the Five Buddha Families.

===== Daka =====
In some instances, the terms ḍāka and ḍākinī have been used for practitioners of tantric yoga themselves. In other instances, just ḍākinī was used for female practitioners, while male practitioners were just known as yogi. Padmasambhava was known as a yogi and Yeshe Tsogyal, a Tibetan princess, yogini and consort of Padmasambhava, as a ḍākinī.

The scholar Miranda Shaw stated that "In Sanskrit there is only one word, Dakini. There are only female Dakinis... there is no male Dakini. It is an impossibility and a contradiction in terms." On the other hand, Pratapaditya Pal stated, "both dakas and dakinis occur frequently in Tibetan literature, though the latter predominate."

Whereas Jan Willis in the chapter Ḑākinī; Some Comments on Its Nature and Meaning points out that "'she' is not 'female'. Though the ḍākinī assuredly most often appears in female form... this is but one of the myriad of ways Absolute Insight chooses to make manifest its facticity."

Tibetan Lamas trained in the Gelug school, such as Sermey Khensur Lobsang Tharchin, and those of the Karma Kagyu school such as Khenpo Karthar Rinpoche, write freely of "dakas and dakinis". Thubten Yeshe clarifies their meaning: "what are dakas and dakinis? Simply speaking they are males and females who possess advanced experiences of tantric transformation and control and are therefore able to increase the blissful wisdom of a highly qualified practitioner."

==== In Anuttarayoga Tantra ====
Being associated with energy in all its functions, ḍākinīs are linked with the revelation of the Anuttarayoga Tantras, which represent the path of transformation, whereby the energy of negative emotions or kleshas, called poisons, is transformed into the luminous energy of enlightened awareness yielding the most profound experience of clear light. Thubten Yeshe explains:

When the completion stage practices have been mastered and we have gained control over our subtle energy winds and so forth, there will come a time when the dakas and dakinis will come... physically embracing such a consort is necessary to bring all the pervading energy winds into the central channel, a prerequisite for opening the heart center and experiencing the profoundest level of clear light.

==== In Dzogchen ====
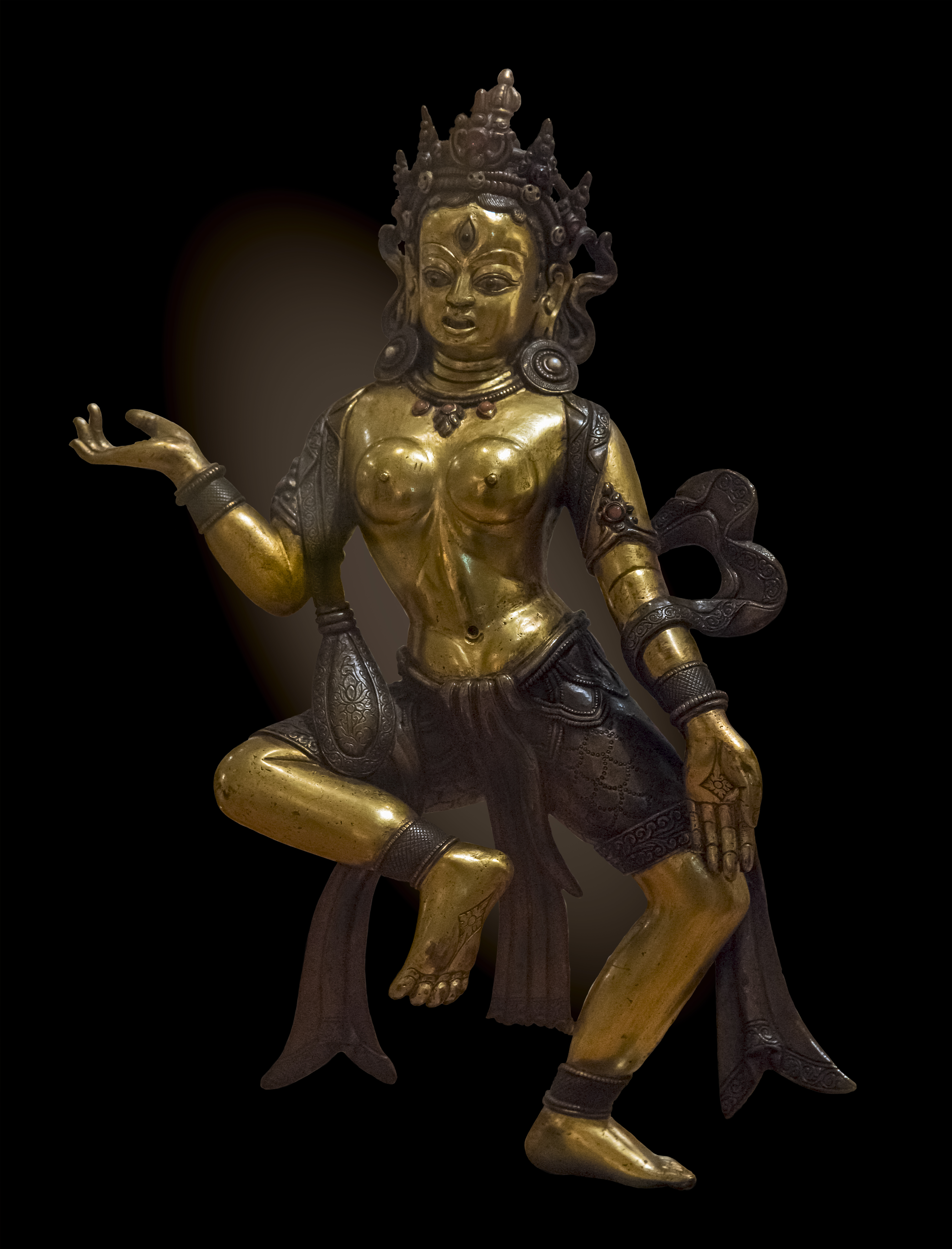
Dancing ḍākinī, Tibet, c. 19th century

When considered as a stage on the Vajrayana Path, the ḍākinī is the final stages: the first is the guru, which corresponds to the initial realization of the true condition of reality, as this is introduced by the guru in the empowerment, if the disciple obtains what the Inner Tantras call peyi yeshe (Wylie: dpe yi ye shes) or the clarity of shunyata. The second is the devata, which corresponds to the meditation insofar as the devata is the method used for developing the state discovered in the initial realization of the true condition of reality. The third stage is the ḍākinī insofar as the ḍākinī is the source of the activities based on the realization of the guru and the meditation of the devata.

In Dzogchen these three correspond to tawa (lta ba), gompa (sgom pa) and chöpa (spyod pa): the first is the direct vision of the true nature of reality rather than an intellectual view of reality, as is the case with the term in other vehicles; the second is the continuity of this vision in sessions of meditation; and the third is the continuity of this vision in everyday activities. As a tantric practice, imperfections are used to make the vision uninterrupted. As the Base, the ḍākinīs are the energies of life; as the Path, they are the activities of advanced practitioners; as the Fruit, they are the actionless activities of realized Masters.

== See also ==
- Apsara – Type of female spirit of the clouds and waters in Hindu and Buddhist culture
- Daayan – Type of witch in Indian culture
- Simhamukha – Tibetan Buddhist wisdom dakini (deity)
- Toyokawa Inari – Buddhist temple in Toyokawa, Aichi, Japan
- Yogini – Kamakshya Tantra
- Yakshini – Female nature spirit of Indian mythology.
