= Novem =

Novem may refer to:

- Novem, a brand name for the drug meloxicam
- NOVEM, a 2006 American film
- Novem., abbreviation for November
