= Tibetan-language film =

A Tibetan-language film is a motion picture where the Tibetan language is spoken significantly. Some Tibetan language films include "Tharlo" and Old Dog, directed by Pema Tseden, China's first director to make films entirely in the Tibetan language, Pawo (2016), directed by Marvin Litwak, and "River"(2015), by Sonthar Gyal

== See also ==
List of Tibetan films
