= Toyokawa =

Toyokawa may refer to:

- Toyokawa, Aichi
- Toyokawa (surname)
- Toyo River
