= Pawo =

In Vajrayana Buddhism, Pawo (Wylie: dpa' bo; literally "brave guy") is translated hero or warrior. Depending on context, it can refer to the ideal of a Vajrayana practitioner; to living people (where it is sometimes used as an honorific or part of a name); to legendary or mythical figures from the past; or to purely spiritual beings.

Pawo is a title given to Tibetan freedom fighters who have sacrificed their lives through self-immolation to bring attention to Tibet's situation under China's occupation.

"Pawo" translates the Sanskrit terms daka and vira, with similar meaning.

Pawos are typically described in consort with khandros, their feminine counterparts. The feminine form of the term pawo is pamo.

The tülku Nenang Pawo is often known simply as Pawo Rinpoche.

The concept of spiritual hero, or courageous fearless spiritual practitioner, plays a central role in Chögyam Trungpa's Shambhala terma, where "pawo" is translated "warrior".

== See also ==
- Dakini – Sacred female spirit in Hinduism and Buddhism
- Pawo – 2016 Tibetan-language film
