= Pawo (film) =

2016 Tibetan-language film

Poster for Pawo.

Pawo (Hero) is a 2016 Tibetan-language film by Marvin Litwak and Sonam Tseten, set in McLeod Ganj, chronicling the life of a young Tibetan refugee boy in India after escaping over Himalayas in search of freedom.

The film is loosely based on late Jamphel Yeshi who self-immolated in protest against human right violations in Tibet.

Pawo was premiered in India in Dharamsala on 7th Tibet Film Festival (TFF).The festival was attended by the Tibetan exile prime minister Lobsang Sangay.

== Background ==
Since 1950, Tibet has been occupied by China. Dorjee, a young Tibetan, grew up in peace 40 years later. After the death of his father, it all comes to a point, where he realizes that his wings are already cut, what it means to be Tibetan in a country which is called "China". Inside Tibet and in exile, a last cry for freedom starts. The narrative of the film is typical of many Tibetan refugees who annually flee persecution from Chinese authorities and pull a precarious existence of limbo in India.

The film was written and directed by Marvin Litwak, and Co-Directed by Sonam Tseten. Shavo Dorjee plays the lead role. Pawo was nominated as best feature film at Palm Beach International Film Festival and won several categories at International Independent Film Awards Festival including platinum Award for cinematography. Gold Award Best Narrative and Best Score

== Awards and nominations ==
Nominated Best Feature at Palm Beach International Film Festival
Nominated Best Feature at Corto Creativo International Film Festival, Mexico
Nominated Best Drama at I WILL TELL International Film Festival, UK
Nominated Best Feature at Jaipur International Film Festival, I
Winner Best Feature Film at Mediterranean International Film Festival Cannes, F
Winner Best Feature Film at Top Indie Film Festival, US
Nominated Best Writing at Top Indie Film Festival, US
Nominated Best Cinematography at Top Indie Film Festival, US
Nominated Best Sound at Top Indie Film Festival, US
Nominated Best Score at Top Indie Film Festival, US
Winner Best Feature Film at International Planet Film Festival Barcelona, ES
Winner Platinum Award for Cinematography at International Independent Film Awards, US
Winner Gold Award for Best Feature Film at International Independent Film Awards, US
Winner Gold Award for Best Score at International Independent Film Awards, US
Official Selection Portobello International Film Festival, UK
Official Selection Haryana International Film Festival, I
Official Selection International Buddhist Film Festival Europe, NL
Official Selection Orlando Film Festival, US
Official Selection Migration Film Festival London, UK
Official Selection Tibet Film Festival, CH/I
Official Selection Human Rights Film Festival Hong Kong, HK

== Soundtrack ==
Soundtrack was composed by German Composer Sebastian Heinrich in collaboration with JJI Exile Brothers. Part of the film's soundtrack is the song The Rose. This song is vocalized by the leading Tibetan diaspora's rockband JJI Brothers's Tenzin Jamyang.
