= Toyokawa (surname) =

Toyokawa (written: 豊川) is a Japanese surname. Notable people with the surname include:

- Etsushi Toyokawa (豊川 悦司, born 1962), Japanese actor
- Takahiro Toyokawa (豊川 孝弘, born 1967), Japanese shogi player
- Yuta Toyokawa (豊川 雄太, born 1994), Japanese footballer
