= JJI Brothers =

Tibetan rock band

JJI Brothers is a Tibetan rock band in based in Dharamshala, India. The band comprises three brothers with their initials represented in the acronym 'JJI'.

Their names are Jigme, Jamyang, and Ingsel. They are Tibetan exiles belonging to the generation born in India. Their music often carries the theme of struggles of statelessness, and of being a refugee and its concomitant agonies.

JJI Brothers' music has been described as an avant garde "mix of Doorsy grooves and Rage Against the Machine style lyrics."

The trio makes their living from running a small, bohemein cafe in McLeod Ganj, Dharamsala.
