= Greener Pastures (film) =

2023 documentary film

Greener Pastures is a 2023 documentary film which explores the lives and mental health struggles of four Midwestern family farms over five years.
