= NOVEM =

- Film poster
- Directed by: Brad Kimmel
- Written by: Brad Kimmel; Patrick O'Connor
- Starring: Tim Acres; Sherry Cothran; Brad Crittenden
- Production company: Bradley David Productions
- Release date: May 6, 2006 (USA)
- Country: United States

NOVEM is a 2006 American independent film, produced and directed by Brad Kimmel, a filmmaker from Evansville, Indiana. Kimmel is also the creator and producer of My Classic Car. The film tells the story of the fictional band NOVEM's epic six-day recording session in May 1973 and chronicles the modern-day discovery of their lost tapes and who they were.

NOVEM has made its way around the film festival circuit and received great acclaim, winning many awards.

== Fictional biography ==
=== The story ===
NOVEM is an American rock band that was formed at Harrison State University during the early 1970s. At the time, very little was known about the band or their music. They all died shortly after their first recording session. It wasn't until nearly 31 years later that the tapes of their recording session were found and their story was told.

=== Formation of the band ===
In the spring of 1973, a group of nine college students formed a strong friendship on the campus of Harrison State University, sharing a common bond of music. Four of them were music majors, and the other five had various degrees of musical talent. Austin Rowles, thought to be the unofficial group leader, encouraged the group to "jam" together after classes. Within weeks, the group was performing in front of fellow college students at frat parties and beer picnics. Rapidly, it became apparent that the group had a special chemistry and a lot of talent, mainly composing original material.

==== Band members ====
NOVEM at Dark Horse Studio (1973) L-R: Tom Lewdowski, Dennis Clark, Jaslyn Walker

- Dennis Clark (Drums, Lead Vocals)
- Peter Shipley (Bass Guitar)
- Mark Winstead (Lead Vocals, Guitar, Piano, Keyboards)
- Tom Lewdowski (Guitar, Lead Vocals)
- Alan Levinly (Guitar, Lead Vocals, Background Vocals)
- Kris Doyle (Violin, Background Vocals)
- Dana Taylor (Lead Vocals)
- Austin Rowles (Guitar, Lead Vocals)
- Jaslyn Walker (Guitar, Lead Vocals)

=== Recording session ===
NOVEM at Dark Horse Studio (1973) L-R: Jaslyn Walker, Dana Taylor, Mark Winstead, Alan Levinly, Peter Shipley, Austin Rowles, Kris Doyle, Dennis Clark, Tom Lewdowski

In April 1973, Mark Winstead came up with an idea for each member of the group to write a song about something they felt strongly about. His uncle owned a recording studio called Dark Horse in Franklin, Tennessee. He offered the group a chance to record their songs free of charge after the spring semester was complete. The group jumped at the chance, and on May 14, 1973, they packed their gear into Tom Lewdowski's van and headed for Dark Horse Studios.

=== Band name ===
The band became known as NOVEM when Dan Cook (the recording engineer) wrote 'NOVEM Songs' (NOVEM is Latin for nine) on the outside of the master music boxes.

=== Deaths ===
On May 19, 1973, after spending a week at Dark Horse Studios, NOVEM packed up and left the rural studio to head back to campus. Tragically they never made it. For some unknown reason, the van failed to stop at a stop sign and entered an intersection at a high speed where it was struck broadside by a large truck. The resulting impact sent the van careening into a wooded area where it flipped several times and burst into flames. Seven of the nine students died that night. Two survived the accident but died days later. Police suspected that the driver of the van fell asleep at the wheel.

The group left with the master session tapes that night, but no evidence of them was found at the accident site. It appears that they stopped by Mark's parents' home in Brentwood, Tennessee shortly after they left Dark Horse. Their best guess is that Mark put the tapes on a shelf in his parents' basement thinking he'd be back later to finish mixing the music.

=== Lost tapes ===
In March 2004, nearly 31 years later, NOVEM's master recording tapes were found along with 20 cans of 16mm film that was shot during NOVEM's week at Dark Horse Studios in 1973 by band member Alan Levinly. The master tapes and film cans were in a box, along with other old records, which was purchased by Jordan Shipman at a garage sale in Brentwood, Tennessee.

== Film ==
=== Limited theatrical release ===
Landmark's Keystone Art Cinema & Indie Lounge

=== Film festivals ===
- Newport Beach Film Festival (2007)
- Westchester Film Festival (2007)
- Santa Fe Film Festival (2006)
- Tallgrass Film Festival (2006)
- Vermont International Film Festival (2006)
- Kansas International Film Festival (2006)
- Stony Brook Film Festival (2006)
- Maryland Film Festival (2006)
- Aarhus Festival of Independent Arts (2006)
- Sonoma International Film Festival (2006)
- Beloit International Film Festival (2006)
- Asheville Film Festival (2005)
- Sidewalk Moving Picture Festival (2005)
- Bethel Film Festival (2005)
- Phoenix Film Festival (2005)
- Palm Beach International Film Festival (2005)
- Waterfront Film Festival (2005)
- Indianapolis International Film Festival (2005)
- New World Arts (2005)

=== Awards ===
- Audience Choice Award (Phoenix Film Festival, 2005)
- Best Soundtrack Award (Phoenix Film Festival, 2005)
- Audience Choice Award (Sidewalk Moving Picture Festival, 2005)
- Grand Jury Prize|Best Competition Feature (Bethel Film Festival, 2005)
- Grand Jury Prize|Best Competition Feature (Indianapolis Film Festival, 2005)
- Special Jury Prize|Best Cast Performance (Indianapolis Film Festival, 2005)
- Best Indiana Film (Indianapolis Film Festival, 2005)
- Audience Choice Award (Beloit International Film Festival, 2006)
- Jury Prize for Best American Independent Feature (Sonoma Valley Film Festival, 2006)
- Respect Award for Feature Film (Aarhus Festival of Independent Arts, 2006)
