= Kawaura River =

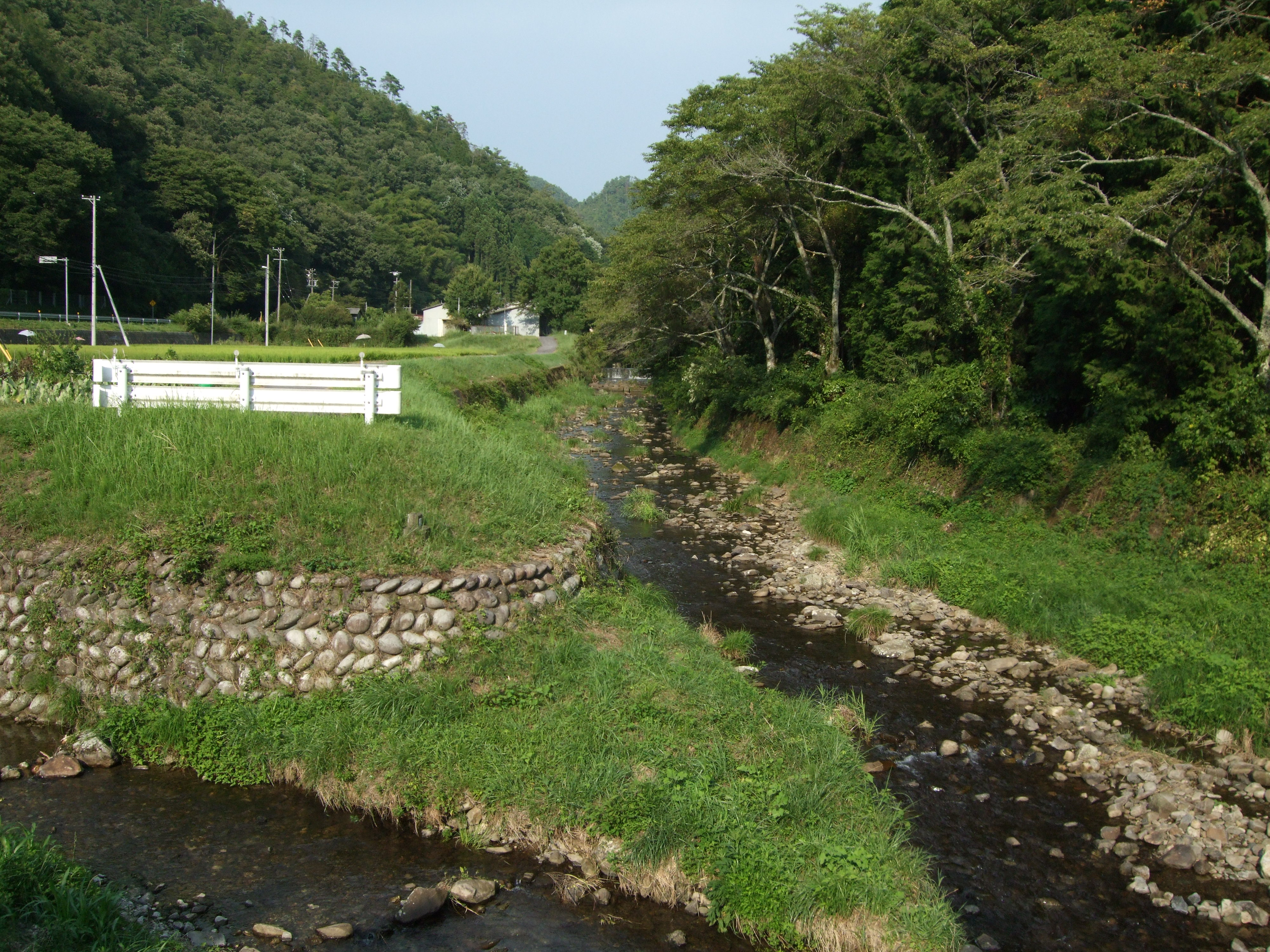
- The Kawaura River flowing through Minokamo

- Native name: 川浦川 (Japanese)

Location
- Country: Japan

Physical characteristics
- Mouth
  - location: Tsubo River
- Length: 13.7 km (8.5 mi)
- Basin size: 544 km^{2} (210 sq mi)

Basin features
- River system: Kiso River

The Kawaura River (川浦川, Kawaura-gawa) has its source in the city of Minokamo, Gifu Prefecture, Japan. It then forms the border between Minokamo and Kawabe and flows through Tomika, before flowing into the Tsubo River.

== River communities ==
The river passes through or forms the boundary of the following communities:

Gifu Prefecture
Minokamo, Kawabe, Tomika
