= Kazuyoshi Kino =

Japanese Buddhist scholar

Kazuyoshi Kino (紀野一義, Kino Kazuyoshi; August 9, 1922 – December 28, 2013) was a Japanese Buddhist scholar.

Together with Hajime Nakamura and others, he translated the Heart Sutra, the Prajnaparamita sutras, and the three main sutras of the Jodo sect.

== Life ==
Born the son of the head priest of Kempon Hokke Myorenji Temple in Yamaguchi Prefecture, Kino moved at the age of four to Hiroshima Prefecture, to Honshoji (temple), when his father became head priest there.

While he was a second year student at the School of Indian Philosophy, Literature Department, Imperial University of Tokyo, he was drafted into the Imperial Japanese Army. At the end of World War II, in 1945, he was taken prisoner in Taiwan. In the same year his family died in the atomic bombing of Hiroshima. He was repatriated in 1946, resumed his studies and graduated in 1948.

In the 1990s he became president of Hosen Gakuen College, Tokyo. He was also vice-president of Shogen Junior College in Minokamo, Gifu.

He had his own radio show called Kino Kazuyoshi no sekai ("Kazuyoshi Kino's World") on Radio Nikkei.

He died on December 28, 2013, of pneumonia.

== Awards ==
- 1958- Indian Buddhist Society Award (印度学仏教学会賞)
- 1967- Traditional Buddhist Culture Award (仏教伝道文化賞)

== Writings (selection) ==
- Hokekyō no tankyū (『法華経の探求』), Heirakuji Shōten, 1962
- Zen : gendai ni ikiru mono (『禅 現代に生きるもの』), Nihon hōsō Shuppan Kyōkai, 1966
- Inochi no sekai Hokekyō (『いのちの世界-法華経』), 1965
- Meisō retsuden (『名僧列伝』1-4), Bungeishunju, 1973－78
- Hokekyō no fūkō (『法華経の風光』), 5 volumes, Mizu Shobō, 1976－77
- Hannya shingyō" o yomu (「般若心経」を読), Kodansha gendai shinsho, 1981
- "Hokekyo" o yomu (法華経」を読む), Kodansha gendai shinsho 1982
- Hannya shingyo kogi (般若心経講義), PHP kenkyujo, 1983
- "Tannisho" kogi (「歎異抄」講義』), PHP kenkyujo, 1984
- Kenji no shinpi (賢治の神秘) Kosei Shuppansha, 1985 (Miyazawa Kenji dowa no sekai series (宮沢賢治童話の世界)
- Shinran ni manabu (『親鸞に学ぶ』), Nihon Hōsō Shuppan Kyōkai, 1988
- Bukkyo no kiiwado (仏教のキイ・ワード), Kodansha gendai shinsho, 1988

== Lecture CDs ==
- Shōbō Genzō ni manabu (『正法眼蔵に学ぶ』), 2008
- Kaze ni kiki mizu ni tou (『風に聴き水に問う』), 2008
- Ee naa! Ee naa! Ee naa!～ Kyūdai Hokekyo no kokoro (『ええなあ！ええなあ！ええなあ！～)旧題法華経のこころ』), 2008
