= Ōta-juku Nakasendō Museum =

Museum in Minokamo, Japan

Coordinates: 35°26′15″N 137°00′47″E

Ōta-juku Nakasendō Museum 太田宿中山道会館
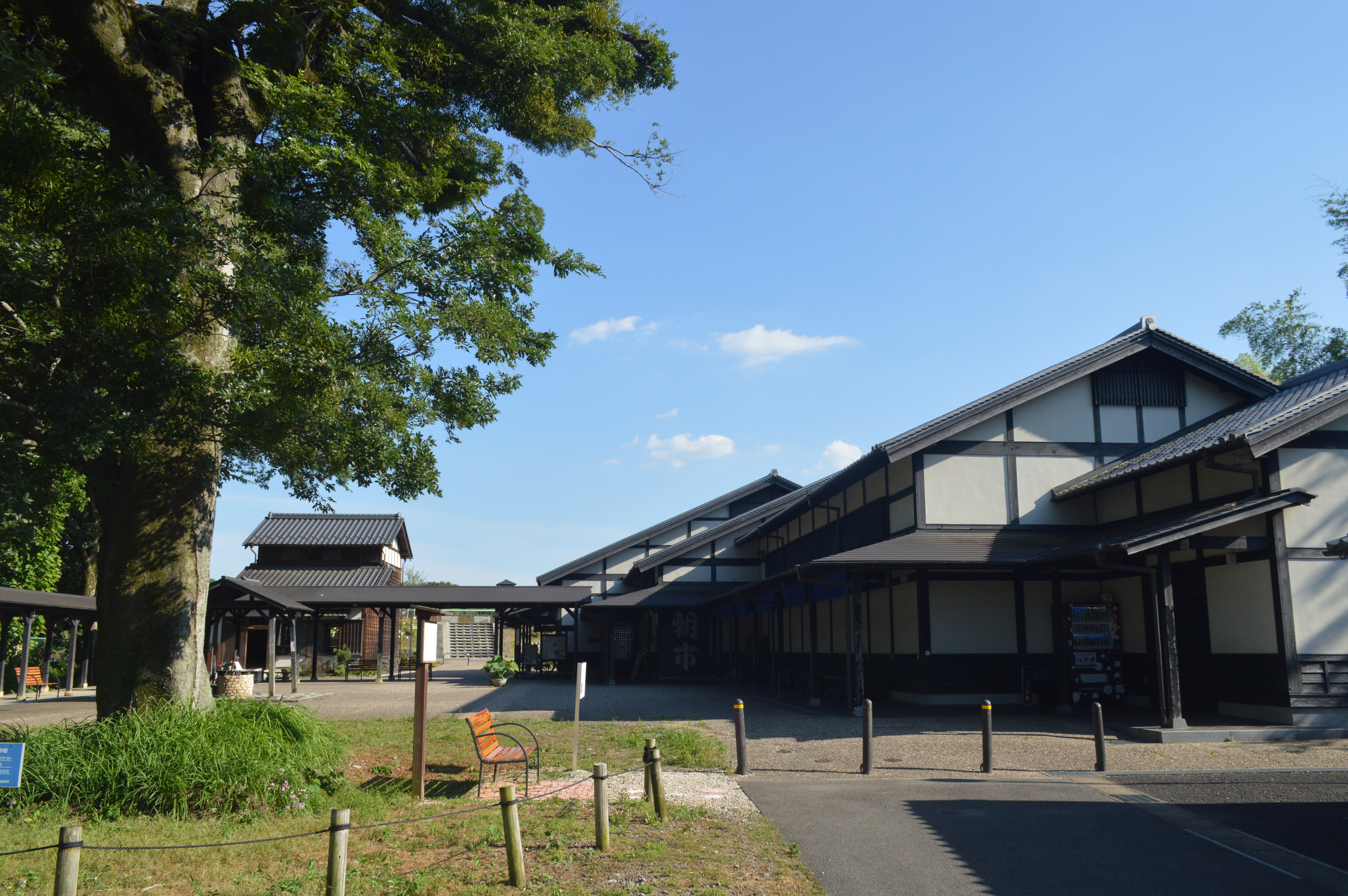
- Established: April 2006
- Location: 3-3-1 Ōtahon-machi, Minokamo, Gifu Prefecture, Japan
- Website: Museum homepage

Ōta-juku Nakasendō Museum (太田宿中山道会館, Ōta-juku Nakasendō Kaikan) is a museum dedicated to the history and culture of the Nakasendō's Ōta-juku and is located in the city of Minokamo, Gifu Prefecture, Japan.

== Exhibits ==
The main focus of the exhibit is on the history and culture of Ōta-juku, one of the Nakasendō's shukuba. The displays include pieces related to Kazu-no-Miya Chikako who stayed at the shukuba while traveling the Nakasendō.

Part of the museum was built using materials from the house of Ippei Okamoto, a famous artist who resided in the area from 1946 until his death two years later. This structure is separate from the main building and is a replica of Okamoto's completed house.

== Facilities information ==
- Hours of operation

9:00am to 5:00pm

- Holidays

Mondays (unless Monday is a national holiday)
Day after national holidays
Dec. 29 to Jan. 3.

- Entrance fee

Free

- Parking

50 spaces

== Access ==
- Tōkai-Kanjō Expressway Minokamo Interchange: 10 min.
- JR Central Taita Line Mino-Ōta Station: 10 min. walk
