= Tomika =

Tomika 富加町
- Town
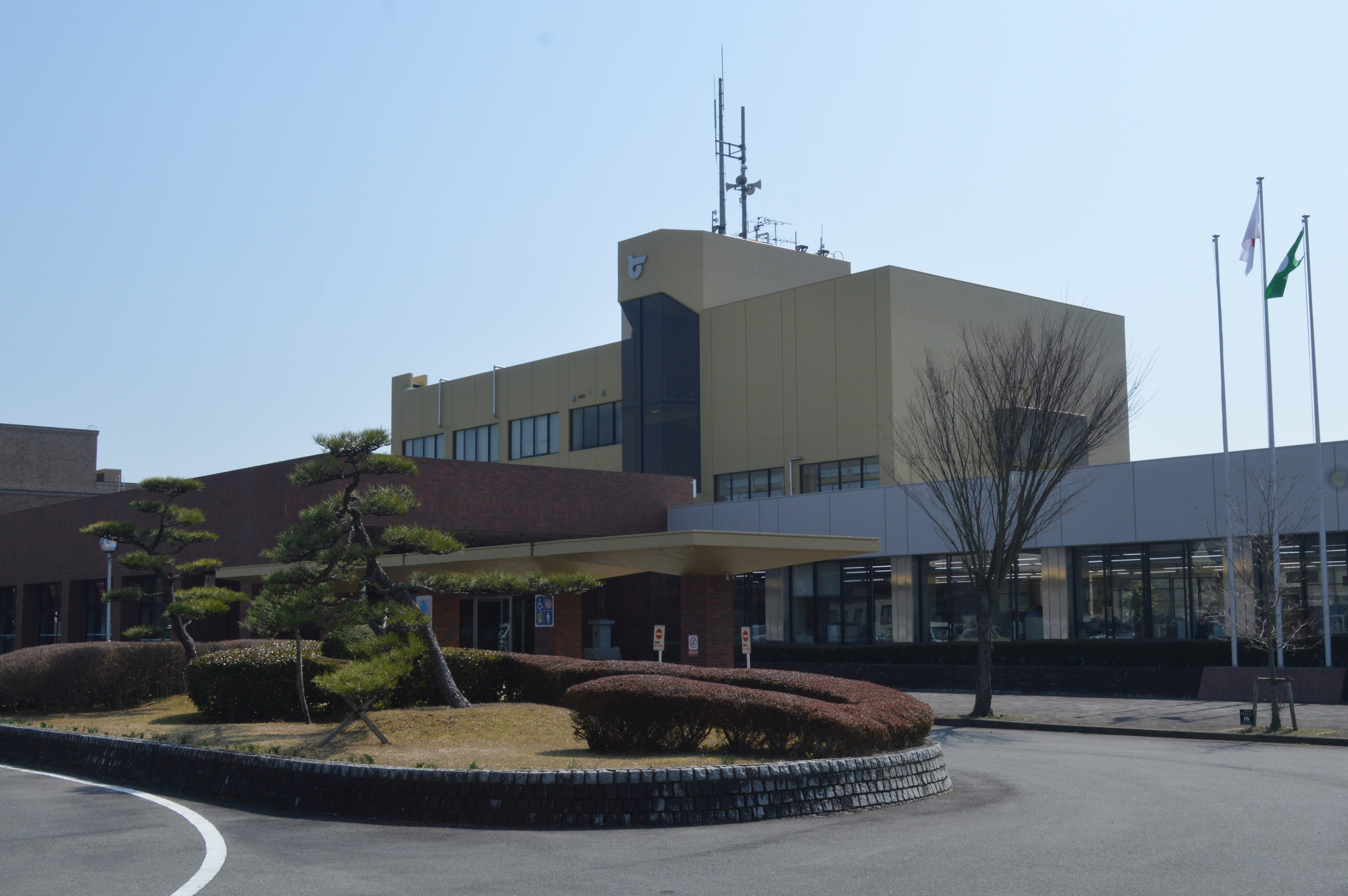
- Tomika Town Hall

- Flag Seal

- Location of Tomika in Gifu Prefecture

- Coordinates: 35°29′5″N 136°58′46.7″E
- Country: Japan
- Region: Chūbu
- Prefecture: Gifu
- District: Kamo

Government
  - Mayor: Hiromichi Sakai

Area
  - Total: 16.82 km^{2} (6.49 sq mi)

Population (December 31, 2018)
  - Total: 5,714
  - Density: 339.7/km^{2} (879.9/sq mi)
- Time zone: UTC+9 (Japan Standard Time)
- City symbols
- Tree: Enkianthus perulatus
- Phone number: 0574-54-2111
- Address: Takida 1511, Tomika-chō, Kamo-gun, Gifu-ken 501-3392
- Website: Official website

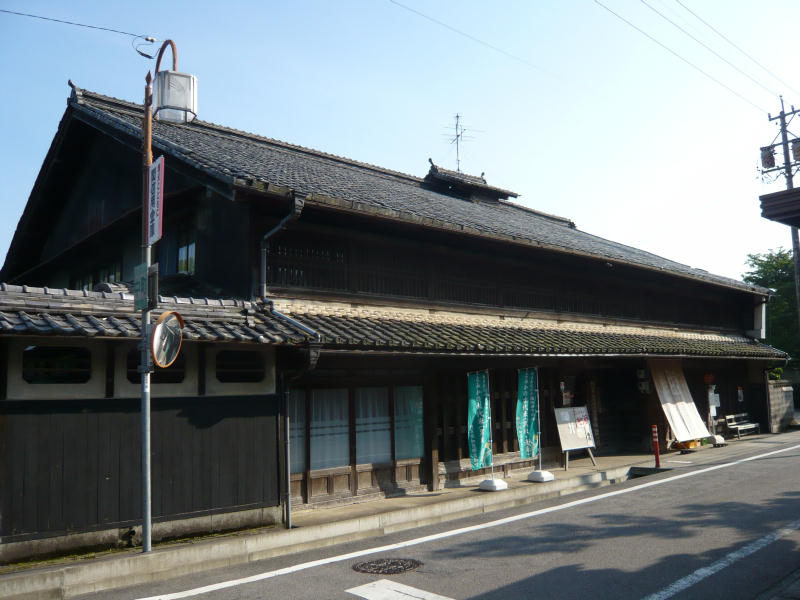
Matsui sake brewery, established in 1795

Tomika (富加町, Tomika-chō) is a town located in Kamo District, Gifu Prefecture, Japan. As of 31 December 2018, the town had an estimated population of 5,714 and a population density of 340 persons per km^{2}, in 1962 households. The total area of the town was 57.09 square kilometres (22.04 sq mi).

== Geography ==
Tomika is located in south-central Gifu Prefecture. The city is bordered by Seki to the west and Minokamo to the east. Mount Nashiwari is within the town's boundaries. The Kawaura and Tsubo Rivers flow through the town. The town has a climate characterized by characterized by hot and humid summers, and mild winters (Köppen climate classification Cfa). The average annual temperature in Tomika is 15.1 °C. The average annual rainfall is 2074 mm with September as the wettest month. The temperatures are highest on average in August, at around 27.8 °C, and lowest in January, at around 3.3 °C.

=== Neighbouring municipalities ===
- Gifu Prefecture
  - Minokamo
  - Seki

== Demographics ==
Per Japanese census data, the population of Tomika has remained relatively steady over the past 50 years.

Historical population
Year	Pop.	±%
1970	4,863	—
1980	5,635	+15.9%
1990	5,898	+4.7%
2000	5,835	−1.1%
2010	5,516	−5.5%
2020	5,626	+2.0%

== History ==
The area around Tomika was part of traditional Mino Province. During the Edo period, the area was tenryō territory controlled directly by the Tokugawa shogunate. With the post Meiji restoration cadastral reforms, Kamo District within Gifu Prefecture was created, and the village of Tomida was established on April 1, 1897. Tomida merged with the village of Kajita on July 1, 1954, forming the village of Tomika (taking its name from Tomida (富田) and Kajita (加冶田) Tomika was elevated to town status on July 1, 1974. A referendum to merge into the city of Minokamo, was defeated in 2004.

== Education ==
Tomika has one public elementary school operated by the town government, and one public junior high school operated jointly between Tomika and neighbouring Minokamo. The town does not have a high school.

== Transportation ==
=== Railway ===
- Nagaragawa Railway Etsumi-Nan Line
  - Tomika

=== Highway ===
- Tōkai-Kanjō Expressway
- National Route 418
