= Kawabe Dam =

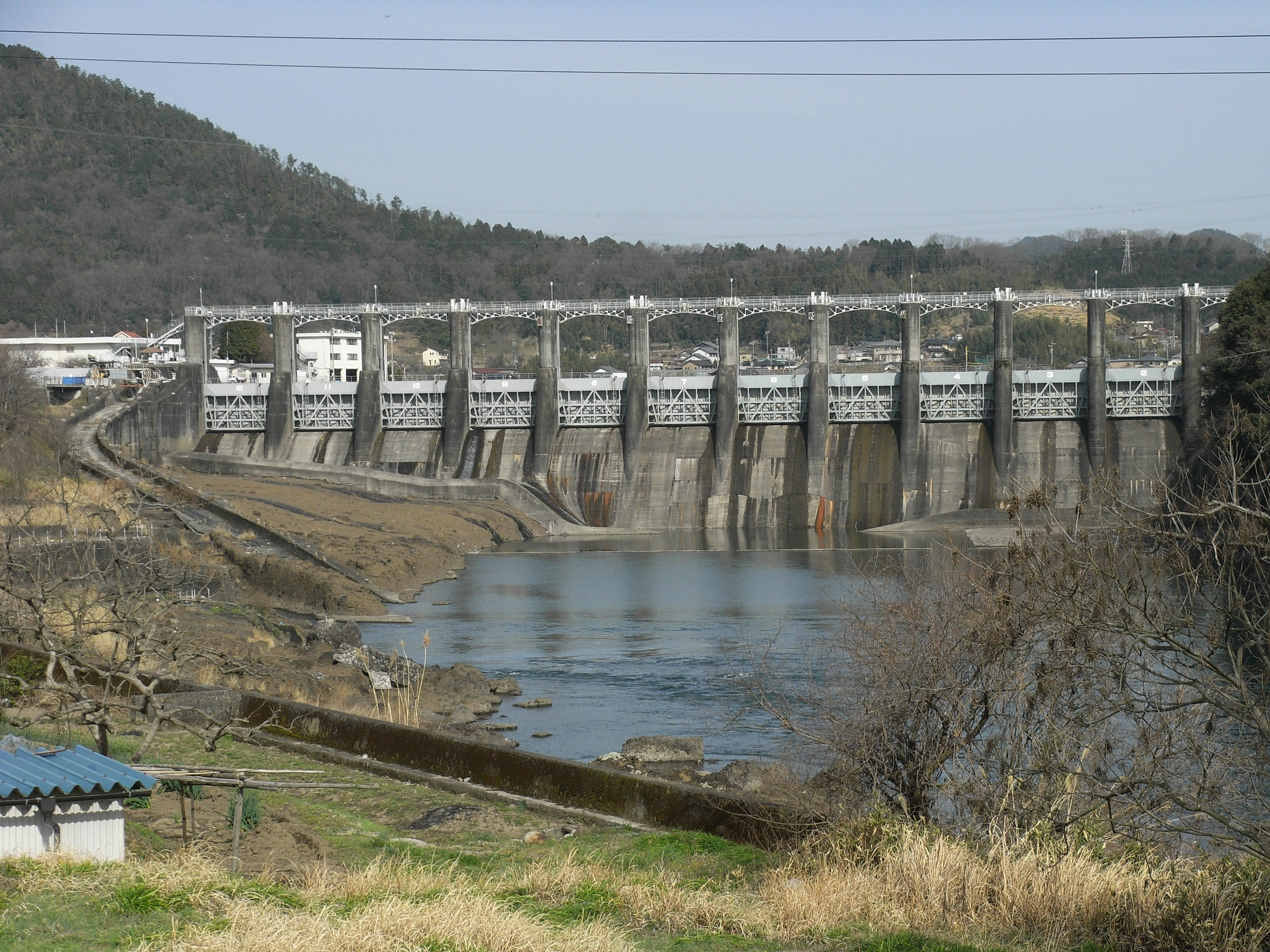
- Location: Kawabe, Gifu, Japan
- Coordinates: 35°28′44″N 137°4′8″E

Dam and spillways
- Impounds: Hida River

Kawabe Dam (川辺ダム, Kawabe-damu) is a dam in Kawabe, Gifu Prefecture, Japan, completed in 1936.
