= Ōta-juku =

Pre-modern Japan post-station along highway

Ōta-juku 太田宿
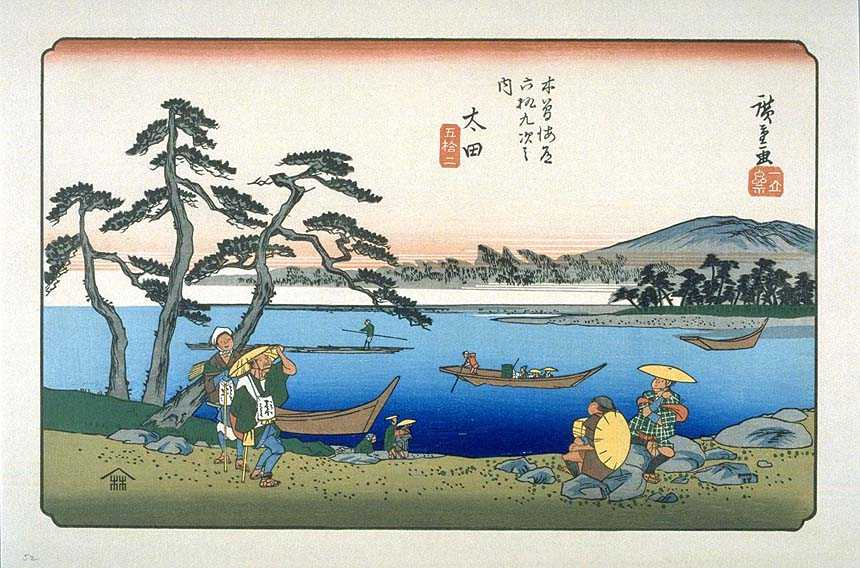
- Hiroshige's print of Ōta-juku, part of the Sixty-nine Stations of the Kiso Kaidō series

General information
- Location: Minokamo, Gifu (former Mino Province); Japan
- Coordinates: 35°26′16.65″N 137°00′48″E
- Elevation: 68 m (223 ft)
- System: post station
- Line: Nakasendō
- Distance: 388.2 km from Edo
Location
- Location within Gifu Prefecture Location within Japan

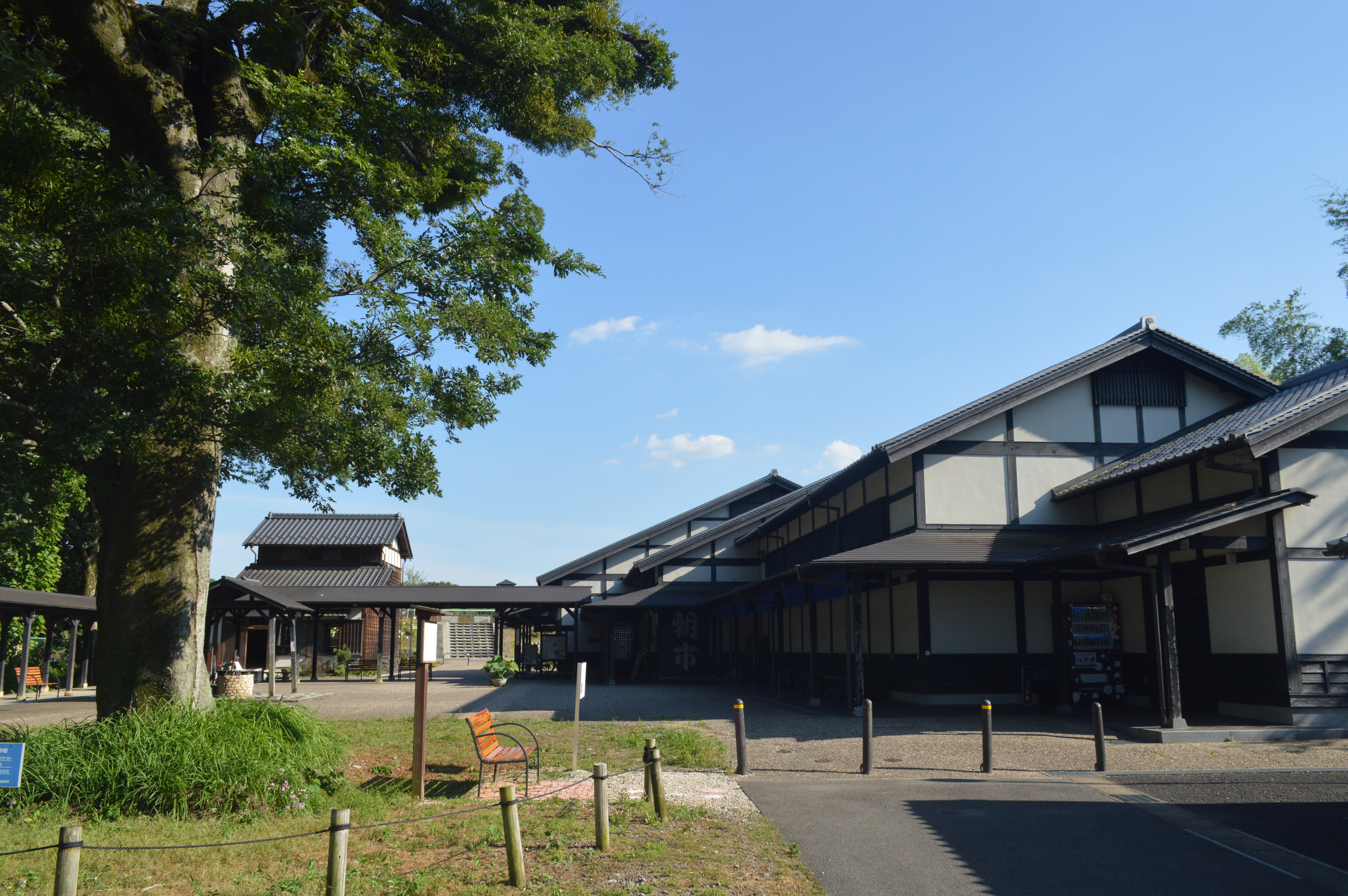
Ōta-juku Nakasendō Museum

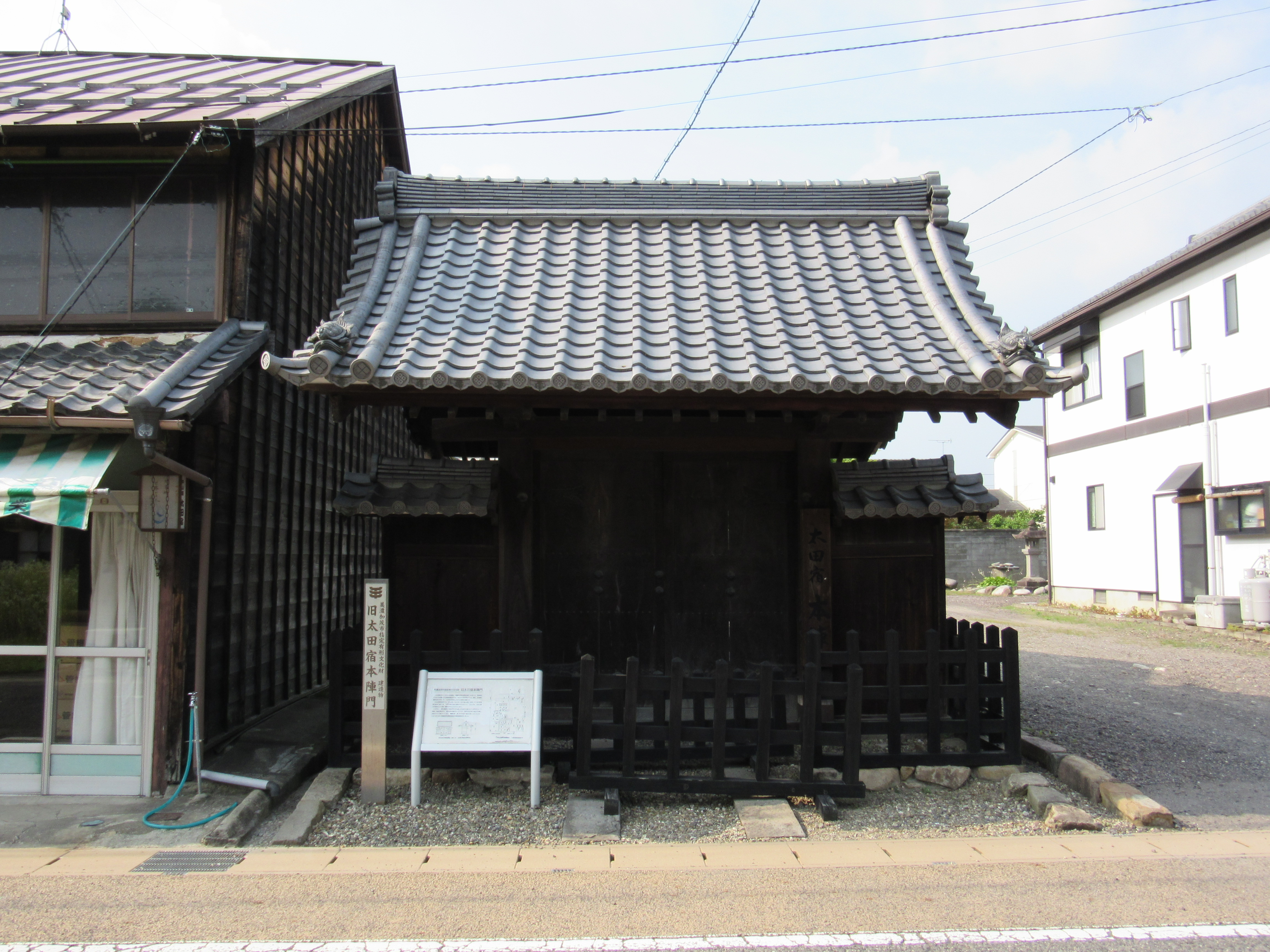
Gate of Ōta-juku's honjin (本陣)

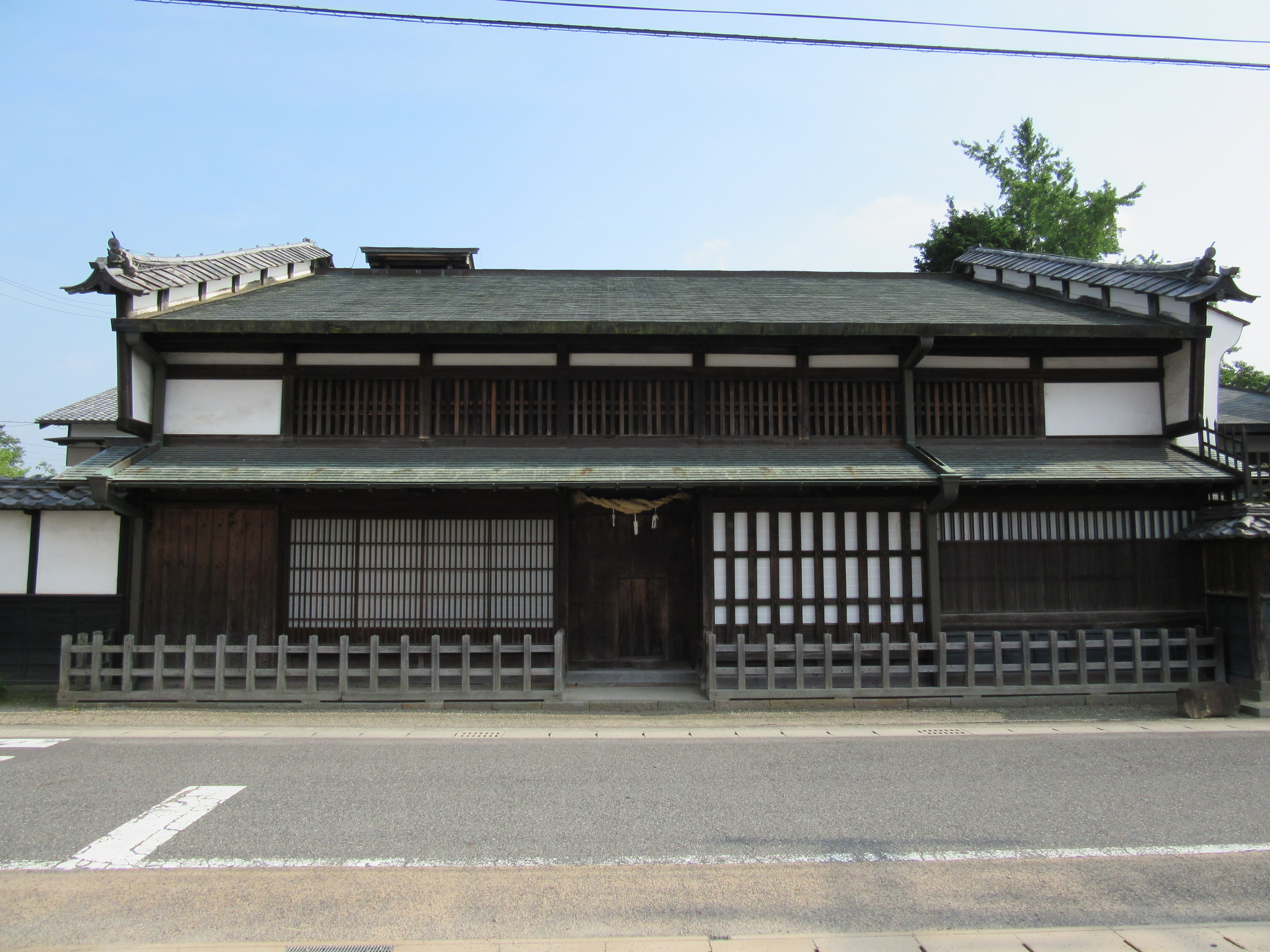
The Hayashi residence, a sub-honjin (脇本陣, waki-honjin)

Ōta-juku (太田宿, Ōta-juku) was the fifty-first of the sixty-nine stations of the Nakasendō connecting Edo with Kyoto in Edo period Japan. It is located in former Mino Province in what is now part of the city of Minokamo, Gifu Prefecture, Japan.

== History ==
Ōta is located at the confluence of the Kiso River and the Hida River, and the river crossing at this location was considered the most difficult on the Nakasendō. During the spring thaw, flooding was common, and the Hida River could be enlarged to over 700 meters in width. This rendered communications difficult, and travelers could be stranded at Ōta-juku potentially for days waiting for the waters to be calm enough to cross. Ōta also within the territory of Owari Domain and was also a regional administrative center, responsible for policing, tax collection and management of local justice. In 1861, Princess Kazunomiya, en route to Edo to marry Shogun Tokugawa Iemochi stayed at the waki-honjin at Ōta-juku.

Per the 1843 "中山道宿村大概帳" (Nakasendō Shukuson Taigaichō) guidebook issued by the Inspector of Highways (道中奉行, Dōchu-būgyō), the town had a population of 505 people in 108 houses, including one honjin, one waki-honjin, and 20 hatago. Ōta-juku is 388.2 kilometers from Edo.

Modern Ōta-juku is fairly well-preserved and is a popular tourist destination, with local tours and programs available, including the Ōta-juku Nakasendō Museum. One of the hatago, the Komatsuya Inn and the waki-honjin, built in 1765, have been preserved.

== Ōta-juku in The Sixty-nine Stations of the Kiso Kaidō ==
Utagawa Hiroshige's ukiyo-e print of Ōta-juku dates from 1835 -1838. The print depicts travelers gathered at the shore of the Hida River waiting to make the crossing by ferry, which can be seen midstream. Also on the river is a man poling a raft made from timber, with lumber being one of the major products of Hida Province upstream. An elderly couple, with pilgrim's staves and knapsack observe the scene, while two young men are seated on boulders waiting for the ferry to arrive. In the distance on the far right shore is Mount Hotobuki.

== Post stations with the same name ==
Ōta-juku is also the name of the seventh post station on the Nikkō Reiheishi Kaidō.

== Neighboring post towns ==
Nakasendō
Fushimi-juku - Ōta-juku - Unuma-juku
