= Shōgen-ji (Gifu) =

Shōgen-ji 正眼寺
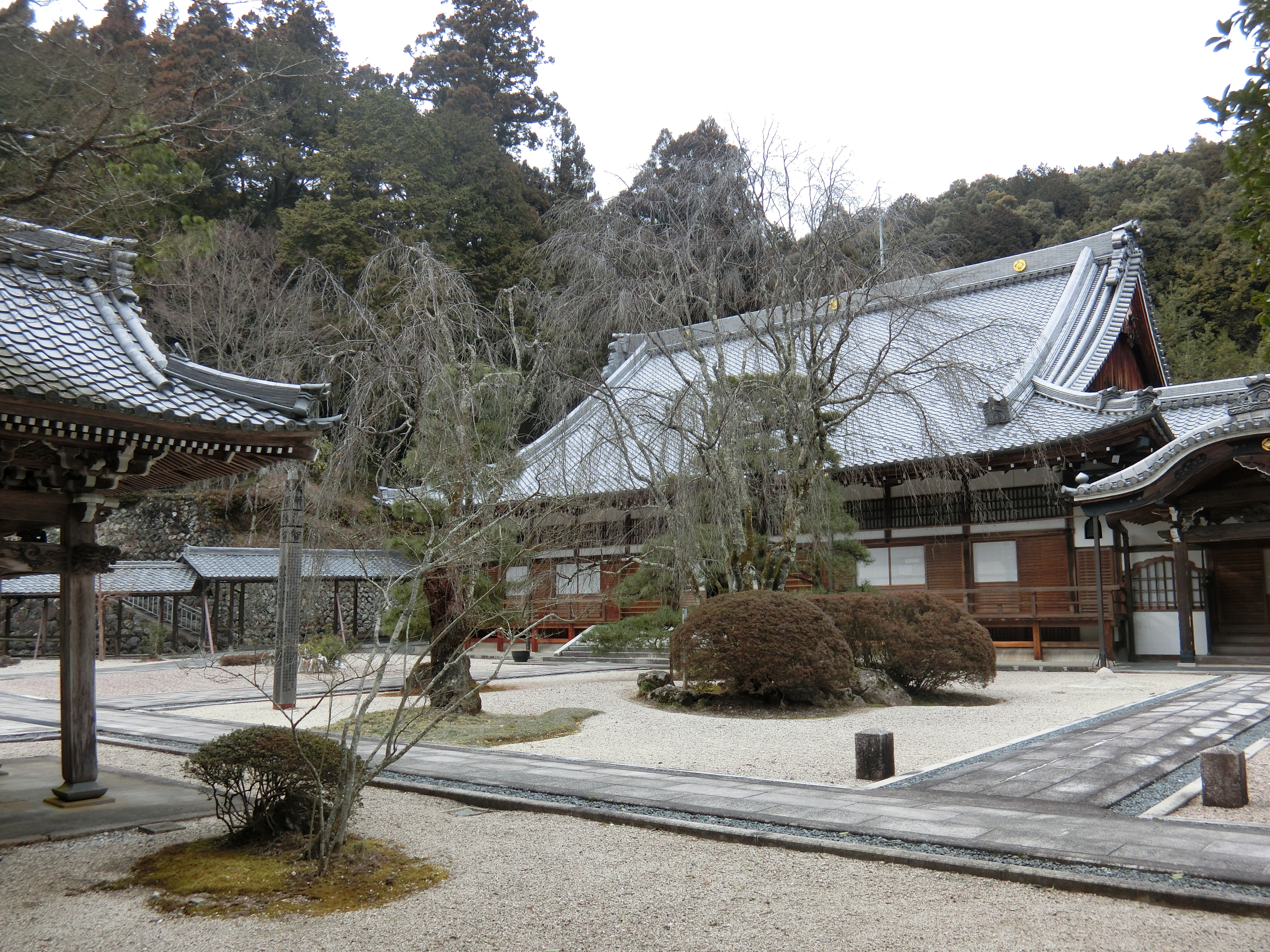

Religion
- Affiliation: Myōshin-ji Rinzai

Location
- Location: 872-2 Ibuka-chō, Minokamo, Gifu Prefecture
- Country: Japan
- Interactive map of Shōgen-ji 正眼寺
- Coordinates: 35°30′17″N 137°0′28″E

Architecture
- Founder: Taikyoku Iitsu
- Completed: 1658

Shōgen-ji (正眼寺) is a monastery of the Myōshin-ji branch of Japanese Rinzai School of Zen Buddhism in Minokamo, Gifu Prefecture, Japan. It was originally a place of practice of Kanzan Egen Zenji in 1330. The training monastery was established at Shōgen-ji by Settan, the dharmic successor of Tōrin. Shōgen-ji's post–World War II monastic life is described concretely with the highest quality of literature in the novel Mind to Mind (1999) by author Seikan Hasegawa.

Around the end of the 19th and the beginning of the 20th century, Shogenji was famed between monks as one of the two most demanding zen monasteries in Japan (the other one being Bairinji in Fukuoka Prefecture).
