= Kobi Station =

Railway station in Minokamo, Gifu Prefecture, Japan

Kobi Station 古井駅
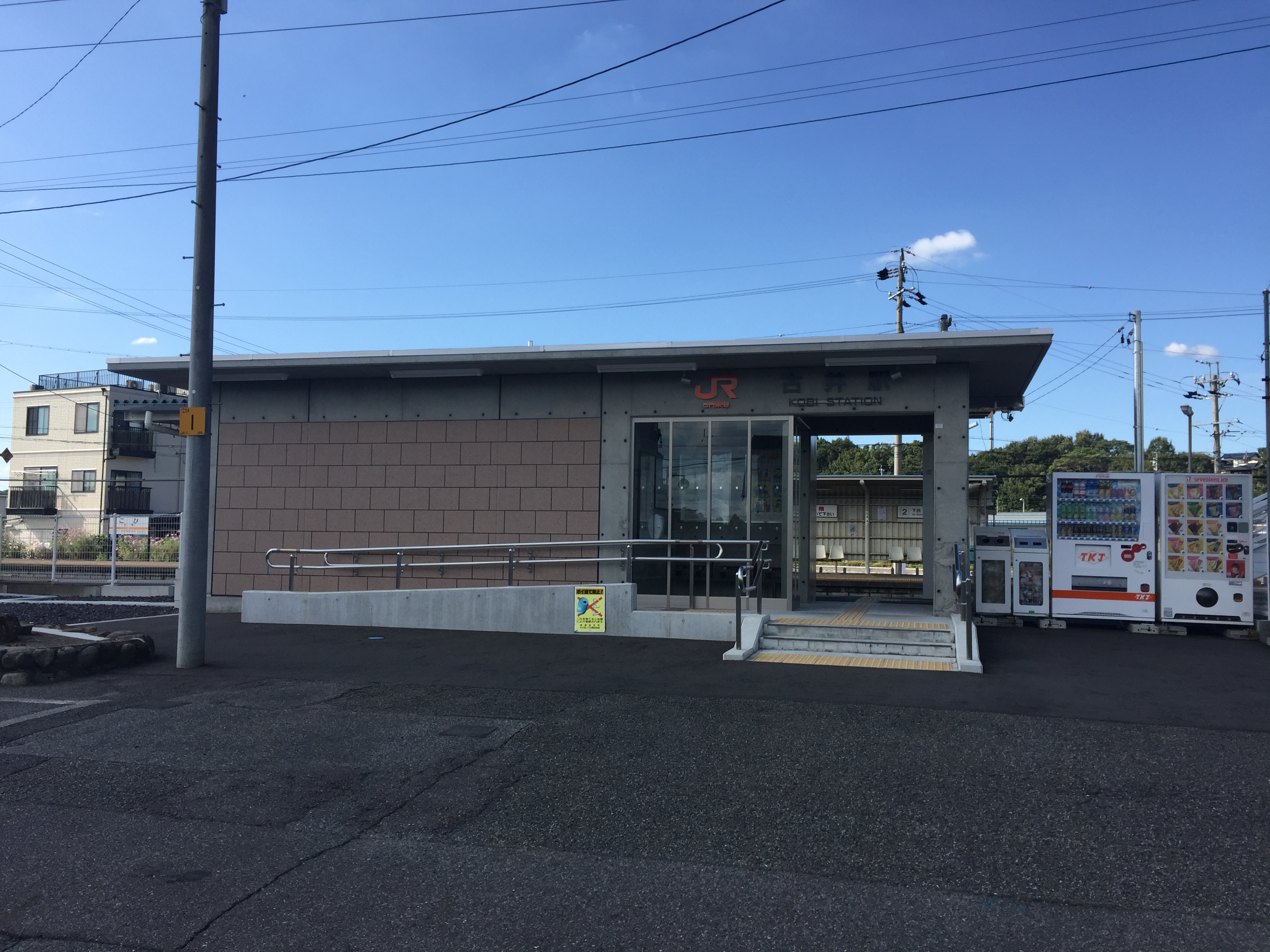
- Kobi Station in October 2017

General information
- Location: 1-139 Moriyama-cho, Minokamo-shi, Gifu-ken 505-0021; Japan
- Coordinates: 35.4575°N 137.0475°E
- Operator: JR Central
- Line: Takayama Main Line
- Distance: 30.3 km from Gifu
- Platforms: 2 side platforms
- Tracks: 2

Other information
- Status: Unstaffed

History
- Opened: November 25, 1922; 103 years ago
- Rebuilt: 2017; 9 years ago

Passengers
- FY2016: 369 daily
Location
- Location within Gifu Prefecture Location within Japan

Kobi Station (古井駅, Kobi-eki) is a railway station on the Takayama Main Line in the city of Minokamo, Gifu Prefecture, Japan, operated by Central Japan Railway Company (JR Central).

== Lines ==
Kobi Station is served by the Takayama Main Line, and is located 30.3 kilometers from the official starting point of the line at Gifu.

== Station layout ==
Kobi Station has two opposed ground-level side platforms connected by a level crossing. The station is unattended.

=== Platforms ===
1	■ Takayama Main Line	for Mino-Ōta and Gifu
2	■ Takayama Main Line	for Gero and Takayama

== Adjacent stations ==
«	Service	»
Takayama Main Line
Limited Express "Hida": Does not stop at this station
Mino-Ōta	Local	Nakakawabe

== History ==
Kobi Station opened on November 25, 1922. The station was absorbed into the JR Central network upon the privatization of Japanese National Railways (JNR) on April 1, 1987. A new station building was completed in March 2017.

== Passenger statistics ==
In fiscal 2016, the station was used by an average of 369 passengers daily (boarding passengers only).

== Surrounding area ==
- Kamo High School
- Kobi Post Office

== See also ==
- List of railway stations in Japan
