= Nakakawabe Station =

Railway station in Kawabe, Gifu Prefecture, Japan

Nakakawabe Station 中川辺駅
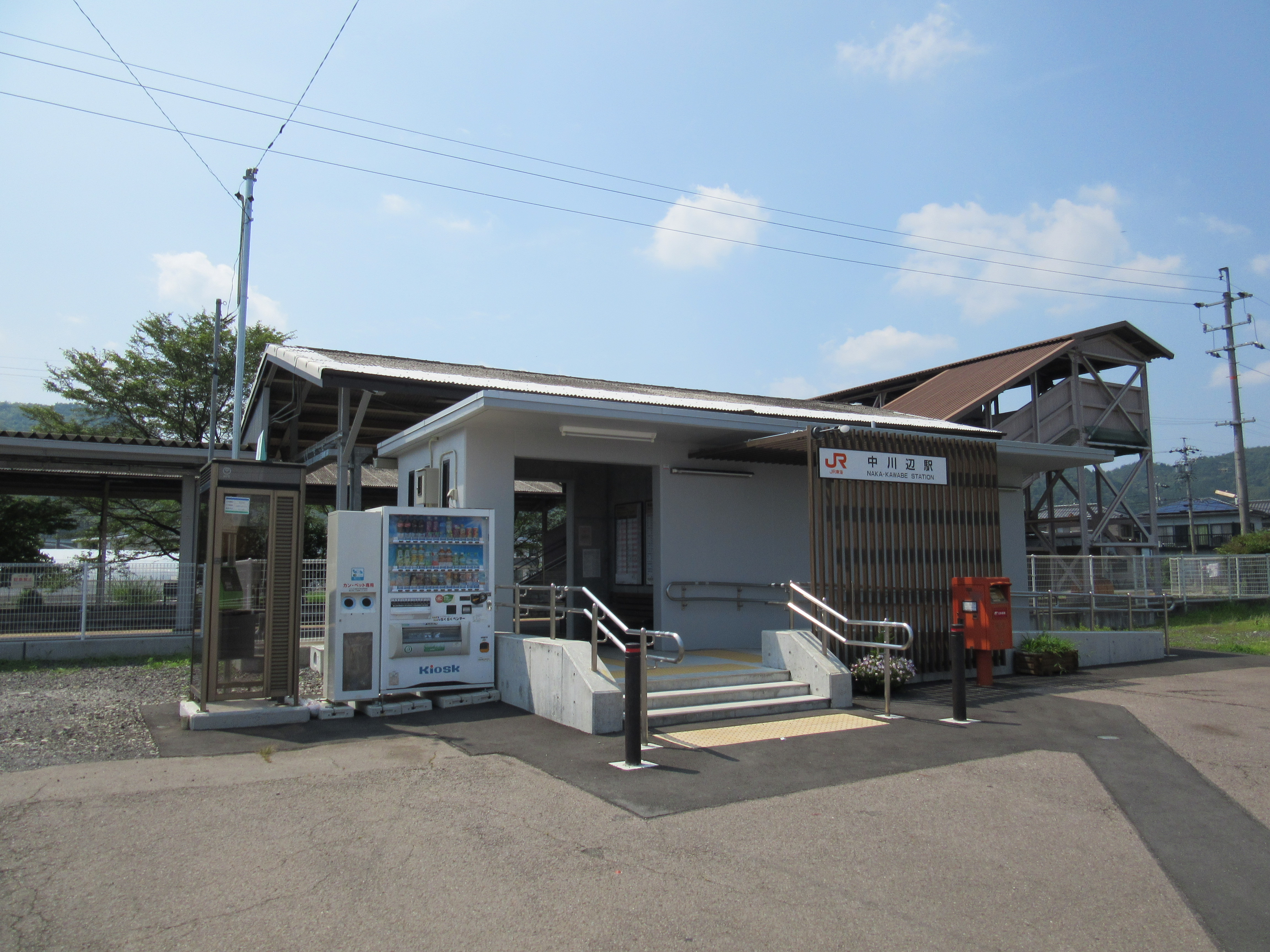
- Nakakawabe Station in June 2015

General information
- Location: 470 Nakakawabe, Kawabe-cho, Kamo-gun, Gifu-ken 509-0304; Japan
- Coordinates: 35.4875°N 137.0650°E
- Operator: JR Central
- Line: Takayama Main Line
- Distance: 34.1 km from Gifu
- Platforms: 2 side platforms
- Tracks: 2

Other information
- Status: Unstaffed

History
- Opened: November 25, 1922; 103 years ago
- Rebuilt: 2015; 11 years ago
Location
- Location within Gifu Prefecture Location within Japan

Nakakawabe Station (中川辺駅, Nakakawabe-eki) is a railway station on the Takayama Main Line in the town of Kawabe, Kamo District, Gifu Prefecture, Japan, operated by Central Japan Railway Company (JR Central).

== Lines ==
Nakakawabe Station is served by the Takayama Main Line, and is located 34.1 kilometers from the official starting point of the line at Gifu.

== Station layout ==
Nakakawabe Station has two opposed ground-level side platforms connected by a footbridge. The station is unattended.

=== Platforms ===
| 1 | ■ Takayama Main Line | for Mino-Ōta and Gifu |
| 2 | ■ Takayama Main Line | for Gero and Takayama |

== Adjacent stations ==
| « | Service | » |
Takayama Main Line
Limited Express "Hida": Does not stop at this station
| Kobi | Local | Shimoasō |

== History ==
Nakakawabe Station opened on November 25, 1922. The station was absorbed into the JR Central network upon the privatization of Japanese National Railways (JNR) on April 1, 1987. A new station building was completed in January 2015.

== Surrounding area ==
- Kawabe Town Hall
- National Route 41

== See also ==
- List of railway stations in Japan
