= Shogen Junior College =

Private college in Japan

Coordinates: 35°30′16.7″N 137°0′16.3″E

- 正眼短期大学
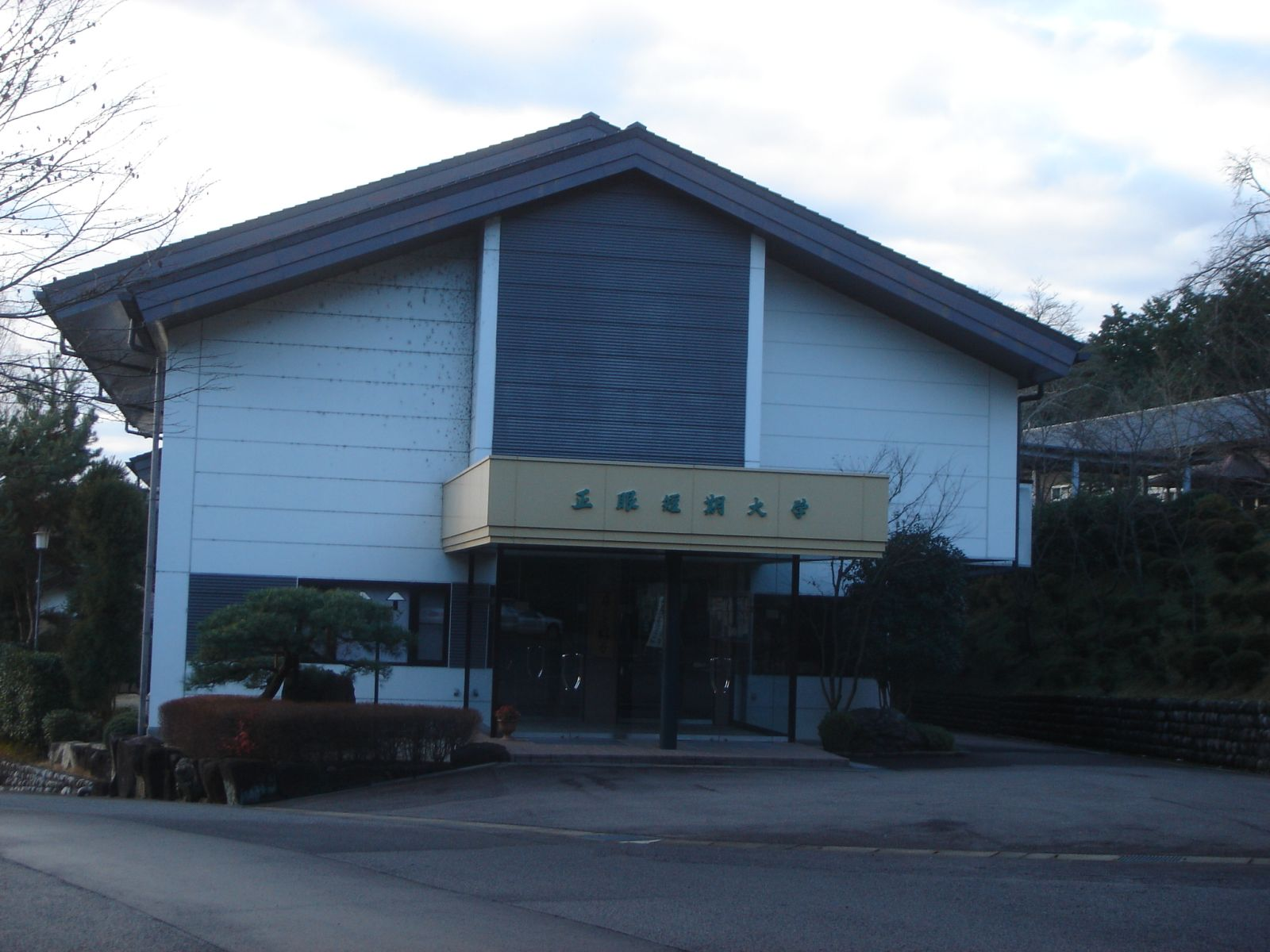
- Shogen Junior College in 2007
- Type: Private
- Location: Minokamo, Gifu, Japan
- Website: http://www.shogen.ac.jp/

Shogen Junior College (正眼短期大学, Shōgen tanki daigaku) is a private junior college in Minokamo, Gifu, Japan, established in 1955.
