= Tsubo River =

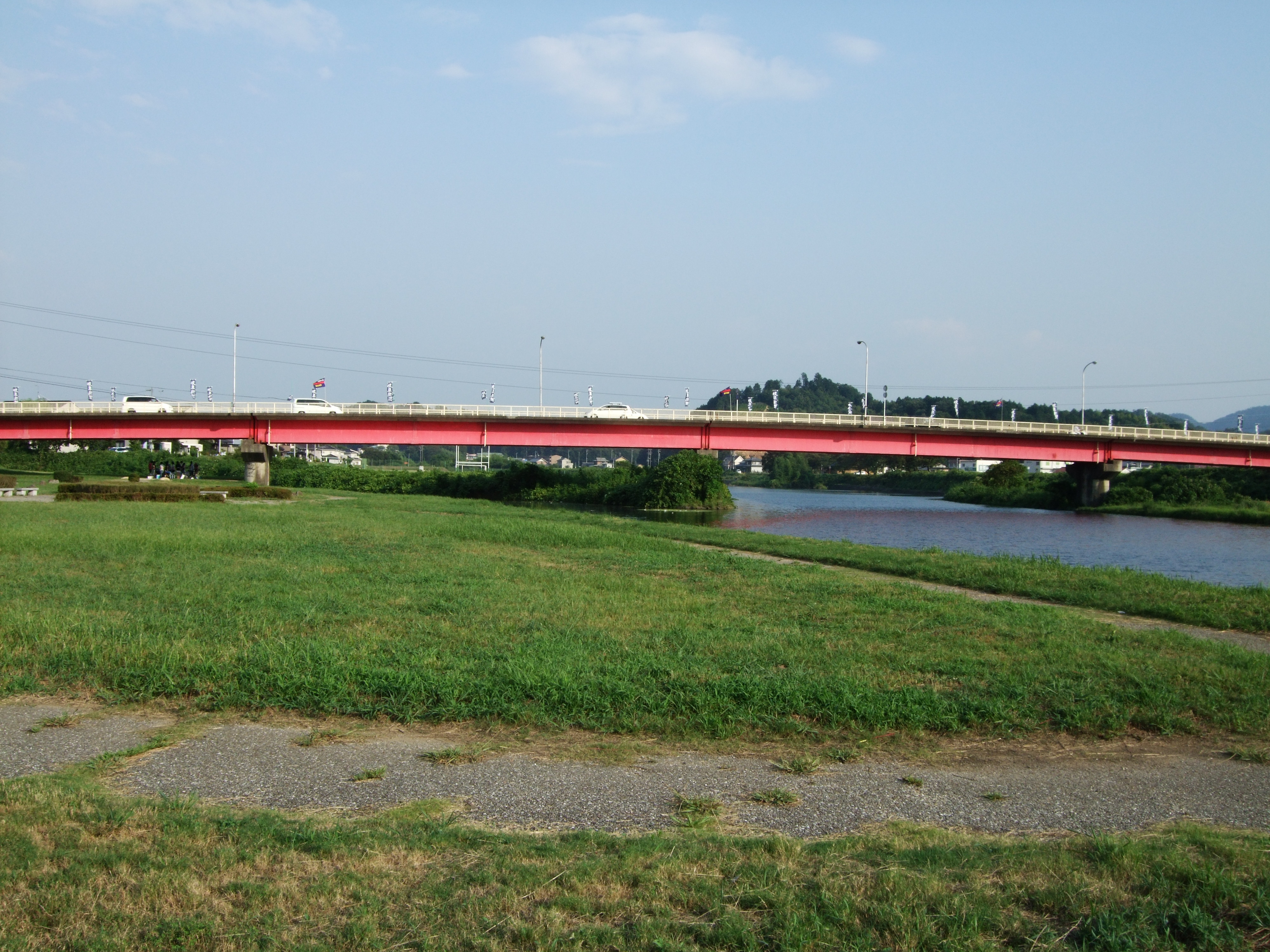
- Tsubo River in Seki

- Location within Japan
- Native name: 津保川 (Japanese)

Location
- Country: Japan

Physical characteristics
- Mouth
  - location: Nagara River
- Length: 45.8 km (28.5 mi)

Basin features
- River system: Kiso River

The Tsubo River (津保川, Tsubo-gawa) has its source in the northeastern portion of the city of Seki, Gifu Prefecture, Japan. From there, it flows through Gifu and into the Nagara River. It is part of the Kiso River system.

== River communities ==
The river passes through or forms the boundary of the following communities:

=== Gifu Prefecture ===
Seki, Tomika, Seki, Gifu
