= Kawabe, Gifu =

Kawabe 川辺町
- Town
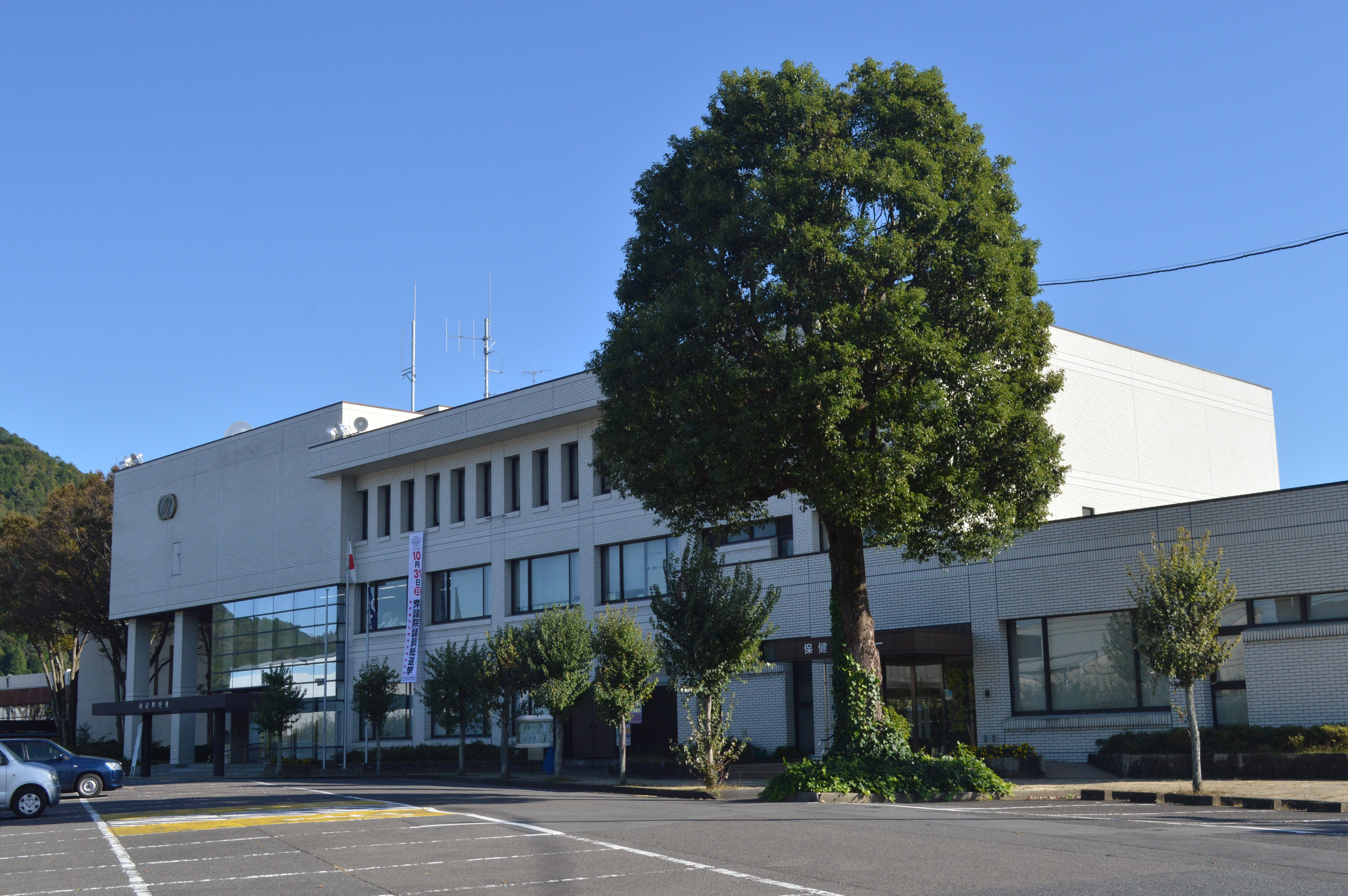
- Kawabe Town Hall

- Flag Seal

- Location of Kawabe in Gifu Prefecture

- Coordinates: 35°29′11.6″N 137°4′14.6″E
- Country: Japan
- Region: Chūbu
- Prefecture: Gifu
- District: Kamo

Government
  - Mayor: Mitsuhiro Satō

Area
  - Total: 41.16 km^{2} (15.89 sq mi)

Population (January 1, 2019)
  - Total: 10,303
  - Density: 250.3/km^{2} (648.3/sq mi)
- Time zone: UTC+9 (Japan Standard Time)
- City symbols
- Tree: Camellia sinensis
- Flower: Satsuki azalea
- Phone number: 0574-53-2511
- Address: Nakakawabe 1518-4, Kawabe-chō, Kamo-gun, Gifu-ken 509-0393
- Website: Official website (in Japanese)

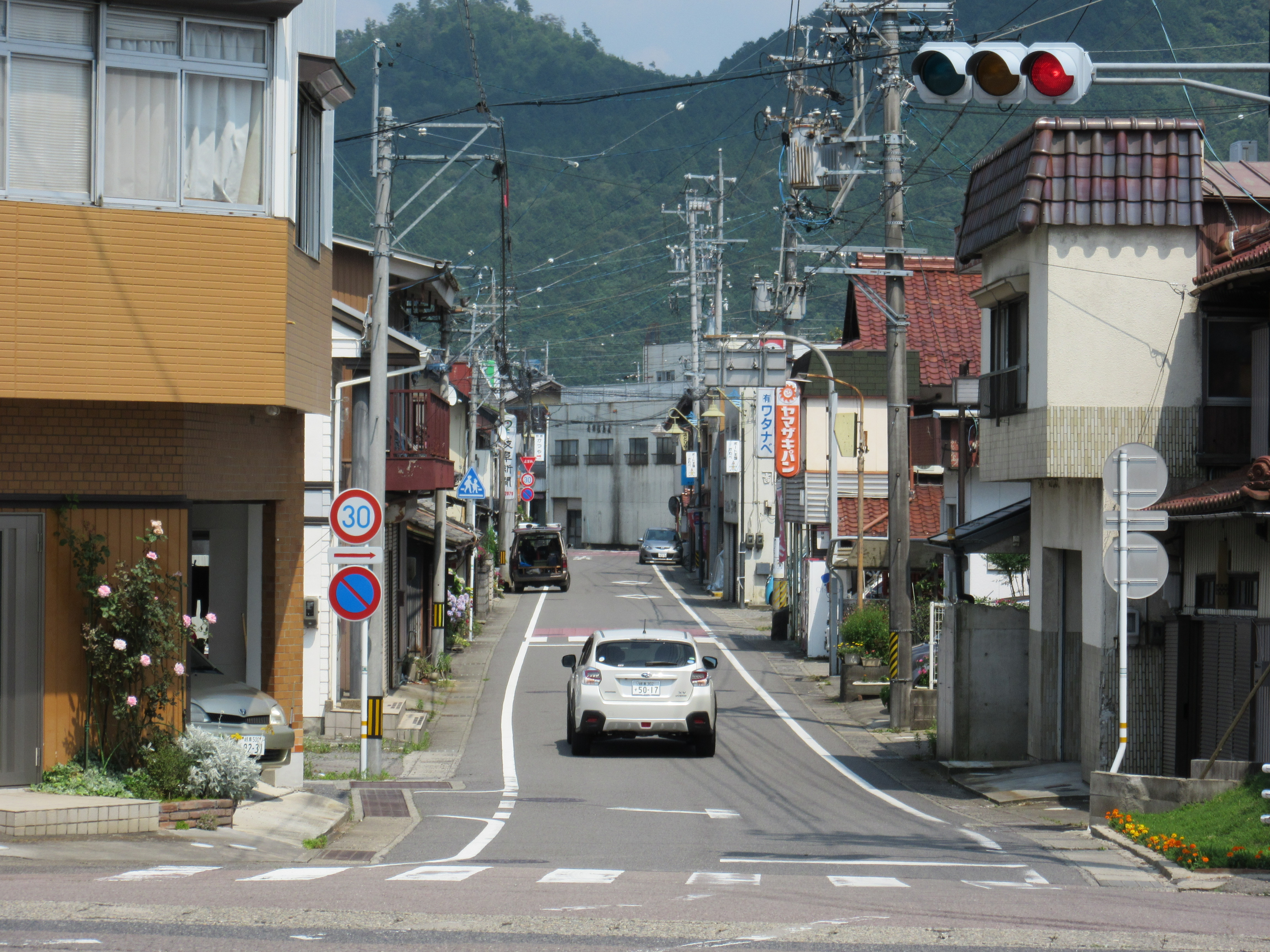
Near Nakakawabe Station

Kawabe (川辺町, Kawabe-chō) is a town located in Kamo District, Gifu Prefecture, Japan. As of 1 January 2019, the town had an estimated population of 10,303 and a population density of 250 persons per km^{2}, in 3876 households. The total area of the town was 41.16 square kilometres (15.89 sq mi).

== Geography ==
Kawabe is located on the edge of the Nōbi Plain in southern Gifu Prefecture. The Hida River flows through the town, which 70% forest and hills. The town has a climate characterized by characterized by hot and humid summers, and mild winters (Köppen climate classification Cfa). The average annual temperature in Kawabe is 15.0 °C. The average annual rainfall is 2058 mm with September as the wettest month. The temperatures are highest on average in August, at around 27.6 °C, and lowest in January, at around 3.1 °C.

=== Neighbouring municipalities ===
- Gifu Prefecture
  - Hichisō
  - Minokamo
  - Yaotsu

== Demographics ==
Per Japanese census data, the population of Kawabe has remained relatively steady over the past 50 years.

Historical population
Year	Pop.	±%
1970	9,885	—
1980	10,255	+3.7%
1990	10,650	+3.9%
2000	11,013	+3.4%
2010	10,593	−3.8%
2020	9,860	−6.9%

== History ==
The area around Kawabe was part of traditional Mino Province. During the Edo period, it part of Kamo District, and was tenryo directly controlled by the Tokugawa shogunate. During the post-Meiji restoration cadastral reforms, the area was organised into Kamo District, Gifu Prefecture. The town of Kawabe was formed on April 1, 1897, with the establishment of the modern municipalities system. Kawabe merged with neighbouring Kamiyoneda on April 1, 1955.

== Education ==
Kawabe has three public elementary schools and one public middle school operated by the town government. The town does not have a high school.

== Transportation ==
=== Railway ===
- Central Japan Railway Company - Takayama Main Line
  - Nakakawabe - Shimoasō

=== Highway ===
- National Route 41
- National Route 418

== Local attractions ==
- Kawabe Dam
