= Minokamo =

Minokamo 美濃加茂市
- City
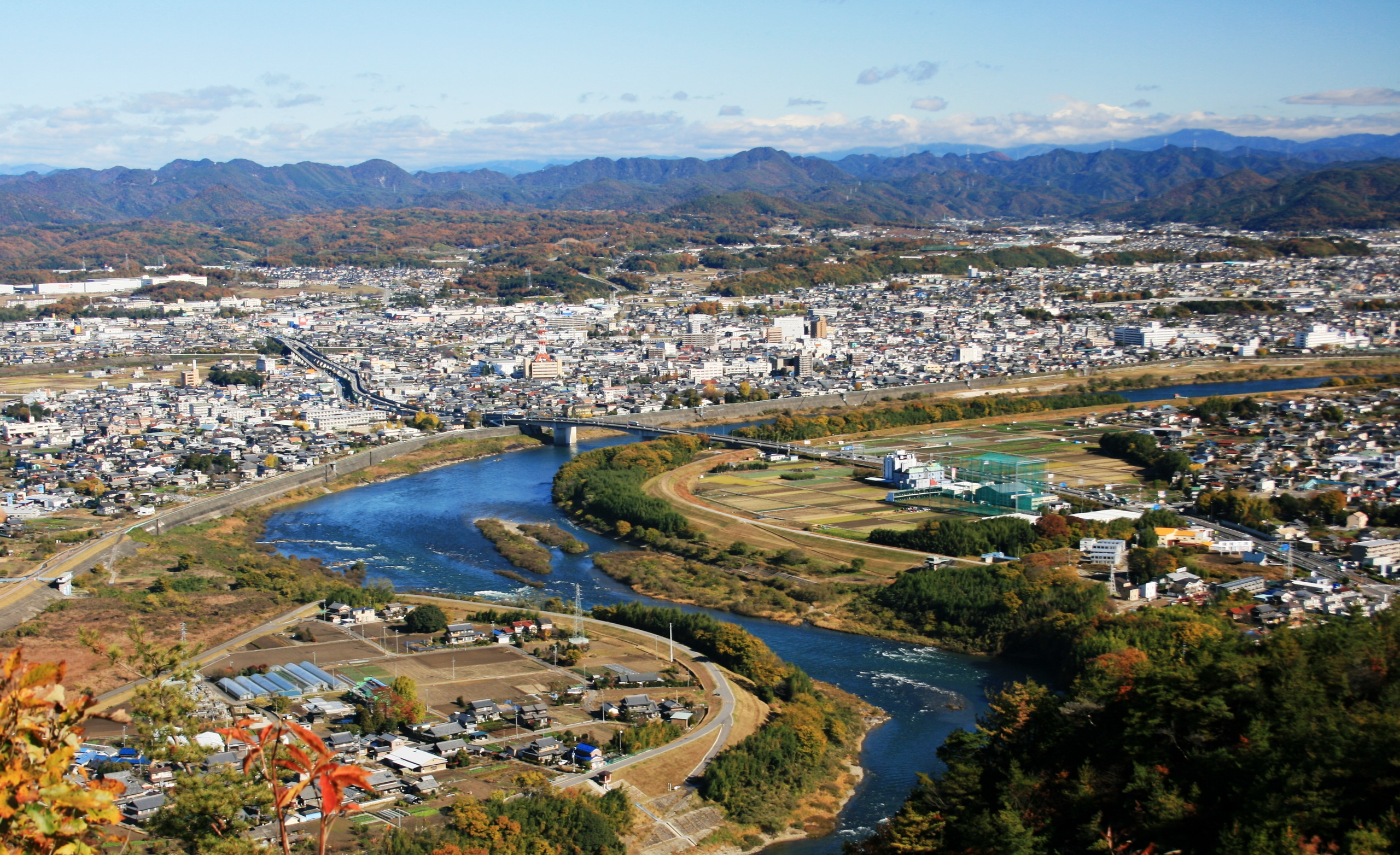
- View of Downtown Minokamo, Kiso River and Mount Ontake, from Mount Hatobuki

- Flag Seal

- Location of Minokamo in Gifu Prefecture

- Coordinates: 35°26′24.8″N 137°0′56.4″E
- Country: Japan
- Region: Chūbu
- Prefecture: Gifu

Government
  - Mayor: Hiroto Fujii 藤井 浩人

Area
  - Total: 74.81 km^{2} (28.88 sq mi)

Population (January 1, 2019)
  - Total: 56,972
  - Density: 761.6/km^{2} (1,972/sq mi)
- Time zone: UTC+9 (Japan Standard Time)
- Phone number: 0574-25-2111
- Address: 3431-1 Ōta-chō, Minokamo-shi, Gifu-ken 505-8606
- Climate: Cfa
- Website: Official website
- Symbols
- Flower: Hydrangea
- Tree: Aphananthe aspera

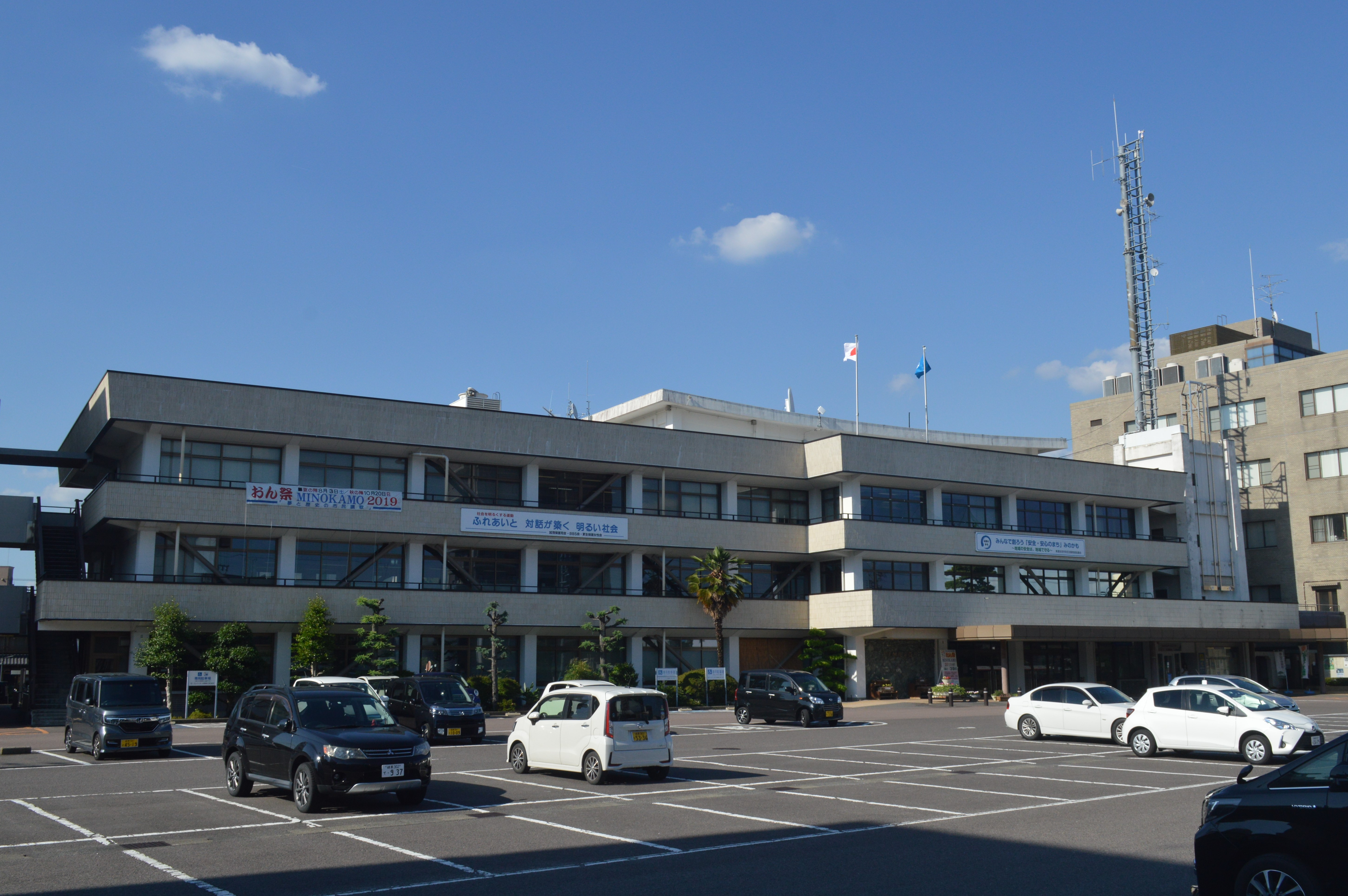
Minokamo city hall

Minokamo (美濃加茂市, Minokamo-shi) is a city located in Gifu, Japan. As of 1 January 2019, the city had an estimated population of 56,972 and a population density of 74.81 persons per km^{2}, in 22,508 households. The total area of the city was 74.81 square kilometres (28.88 sq mi).

== Geography ==
Minokamo is located in south-central Gifu Prefecture in the Nōbi Plain, between the Hida Mountains and the Kiso River.

=== Neighbouring municipalities ===
- Gifu Prefecture
  - Hichisō
  - Kani
  - Kawabe
  - Mitake
  - Sakahogi
  - Seki
  - Tomika
  - Yaotsu

=== Climate ===
The city has a climate characterized by hot and humid summers, and mild winters (Köppen climate classification Cfa). The average annual temperature in Minokamo is 15.1 °C (59.2 °F). The average annual rainfall is 1,756.8 mm (69.17 in) with July as the wettest month. The temperatures are highest on average in August, at around 27.5 °C (81.5 °F), and lowest in January, at around 3.1 °C (37.6 °F).

Climate data for Minokamo (1991−2020 normals, extremes 1978−present)
Month	Jan	Feb	Mar	Apr	May	Jun	Jul	Aug	Sep	Oct	Nov	Dec	Year
Record high °C (°F)	16.6 (61.9)	20.3 (68.5)	24.7 (76.5)	30.2 (86.4)	33.9 (93.0)	36.1 (97.0)	39.8 (103.6)	39.5 (103.1)	38.4 (101.1)	32.6 (90.7)	25.1 (77.2)	22.1 (71.8)	39.8 (103.6)
Mean daily maximum °C (°F)	8.2 (46.8)	9.5 (49.1)	13.7 (56.7)	19.7 (67.5)	24.7 (76.5)	27.7 (81.9)	31.4 (88.5)	33.2 (91.8)	28.8 (83.8)	22.9 (73.2)	16.7 (62.1)	10.7 (51.3)	20.6 (69.1)
Daily mean °C (°F)	3.1 (37.6)	4.0 (39.2)	7.9 (46.2)	13.6 (56.5)	18.7 (65.7)	22.5 (72.5)	26.3 (79.3)	27.5 (81.5)	23.6 (74.5)	17.5 (63.5)	11.1 (52.0)	5.5 (41.9)	15.1 (59.2)
Mean daily minimum °C (°F)	−1.3 (29.7)	−0.9 (30.4)	2.4 (36.3)	7.7 (45.9)	13.2 (55.8)	18.2 (64.8)	22.5 (72.5)	23.4 (74.1)	19.6 (67.3)	13.0 (55.4)	6.2 (43.2)	1.0 (33.8)	10.4 (50.8)
Record low °C (°F)	−8.7 (16.3)	−8.6 (16.5)	−8.9 (16.0)	−2.0 (28.4)	1.9 (35.4)	8.3 (46.9)	15.2 (59.4)	15.3 (59.5)	7.8 (46.0)	0.9 (33.6)	−2.5 (27.5)	−6.9 (19.6)	−8.9 (16.0)
Average precipitation mm (inches)	58.5 (2.30)	71.8 (2.83)	128.1 (5.04)	148.2 (5.83)	174.0 (6.85)	208.7 (8.22)	274.8 (10.82)	179.9 (7.08)	230.8 (9.09)	152.5 (6.00)	86.9 (3.42)	64.7 (2.55)	1,756.8 (69.17)
Average precipitation days (≥ 1.0 mm)	7.2	7.3	9.4	10.3	10.6	12.2	13.2	9.7	11.6	9.3	7.7	8.2	116.7
Mean monthly sunshine hours	158.5	164.8	198.8	194.6	197.8	144.6	161.2	198.8	159.4	159.4	148.0	149.4	2,027.3
Source: Japan Meteorological Agency

== Demographics ==
Per Japanese census data, the population of Minokamo has grown substantially over the past 50 years. Notably, the proportion of foreign nationals residing in the city is very high for Japan, at 9.2% as of October 2020. The foreign residents are predominantly from Brazil or the Philippines, with small but growing Chinese and Vietnamese populations.

Historical population
Year	Pop.	±%
1970	35,075	—
1980	39,531	+12.7%
1990	43,013	+8.8%
2000	50,063	+16.4%
2010	54,729	+9.3%
2020	56,589	+3.4%

== History ==
The area around Minokamo was part of traditional Mino Province. In the Edo period, the area was divided between the holdings of Owari Domain and Naegi Domain, and tenryō holdings directly under the Tokugawa shogunate. Ōta-juku flourished as a post station on the Nakasendō highway connecting Edo with Kyoto. In the post-Meiji restoration cadastral reforms, Kamo District in Gifu prefecture was created. The modern city was formed on April 1, 1954 by the merger of the towns of Ota and Furui with the villages of Yamanoue, Hachiya, Kamono, Ibuka, Shimoyoneda and Miwa.

== Government ==
Minokamo has a mayor-council form of government with a directly elected mayor and a unicameral city legislature of 16 members.

== Economy ==
The area around Minokamo was formerly known for sericulture. Agriculture, including horticulture remains an important component of the local economy, producing crops such as rice, Asian pears, and persimmons. However, since the 1960s, the area has become increasingly industrialized as part of the Chubu Plateau Industrial Zone. Industries include textiles, semiconductor, electronics, machine tools and automotive components, as well as food products.

== Education ==
=== Tertiary Education ===
- Shogen Junior College, a traditional Japanese arts and Buddhist scripture university run by the Shogenji Temple.
- Ajisai Nursing College
- Takumi Academy, a Gifu prefecture-run vocational school that offers associates degrees in industrial technology, and construction, and vocational certificates in residential construction, automobile engineering, and public facilities.

=== Primary and Secondary Schools ===
Minokamo has nine public elementary schools, and two public junior high schools operated by the city government, a junior high school operated by an association between Minokamo City and the neighbouring Tomika Town, and a private combined junior/senior high school, Minokamo Gakuen. The city has two public high schools operated by the Gifu Prefectural Board of Education, which also operates a special education school.

Minokamo has a Brazilian school, the Colégio Isaac Newton Japão ("Isaac Newton College Japan"; )

== Transportation ==
=== Railway ===
- - JR Central - Takayama Main Line
  - Mino-Ōta - Kobi
- - JR Central - Taita Line
  - Mino-Ōta - Mino Kawai
- Nagaragawa Railway Etsumi-Nan Line
  - Mino-Ōta - Maehira-Kōen - Kamono

=== Bus ===
- Yaotsu Line run by Tōnō Tetsudō to Yaotsu Town
- The Odakyu Bus "Papillon" overnight bus connection to Shibuya (Tokyo)
- the Ai Ai Community Bus

=== Highway ===
- Tōkai-Kanjō Expressway
- National Route 21
- National Route 41
- National Route 248
- National Route 418

== Sister cities ==
Minokamo is twinned with:

- Dubbo, Australia

== Local attractions ==
- Gifu-Seiryu Satoyama Park, a prefectural park with outdoor activities
- Koyama Kannon Temple
- Kobi no Tengusan, the main shrine of the Aranagikyō Religion
- The Ota-juku area, a post town on the Nakasendo
- River Port Park Minokamo, a park with river sports activities
- Shōgen-ji, a Buddhist monastery
- Yamazaki Mazak Machine Tools Museum

=== Seasonal Festivals ===
- Summer Onsai Festival (on the first weekend of August)
- Autumn Onsai Festival (in October)
- Minokamo Citizens' Festival (in November)

== Notable people from Minokamo ==
- Tsubouchi Shōyō, author
