= 69 Stations of the Nakasendō =

Rest areas along old travel route in Japan

The 69 Stations of the Nakasendō (中山道六十九次, Nakasendō Rokujūkyū-tsugi) are the rest areas along the Nakasendō, which ran from Nihonbashi in Edo (modern-day Tokyo) to Sanjō Ōhashi in Kyoto. The route stretched approximately 534 km (332 mi) and was an alternate trade route to the Tōkaidō.

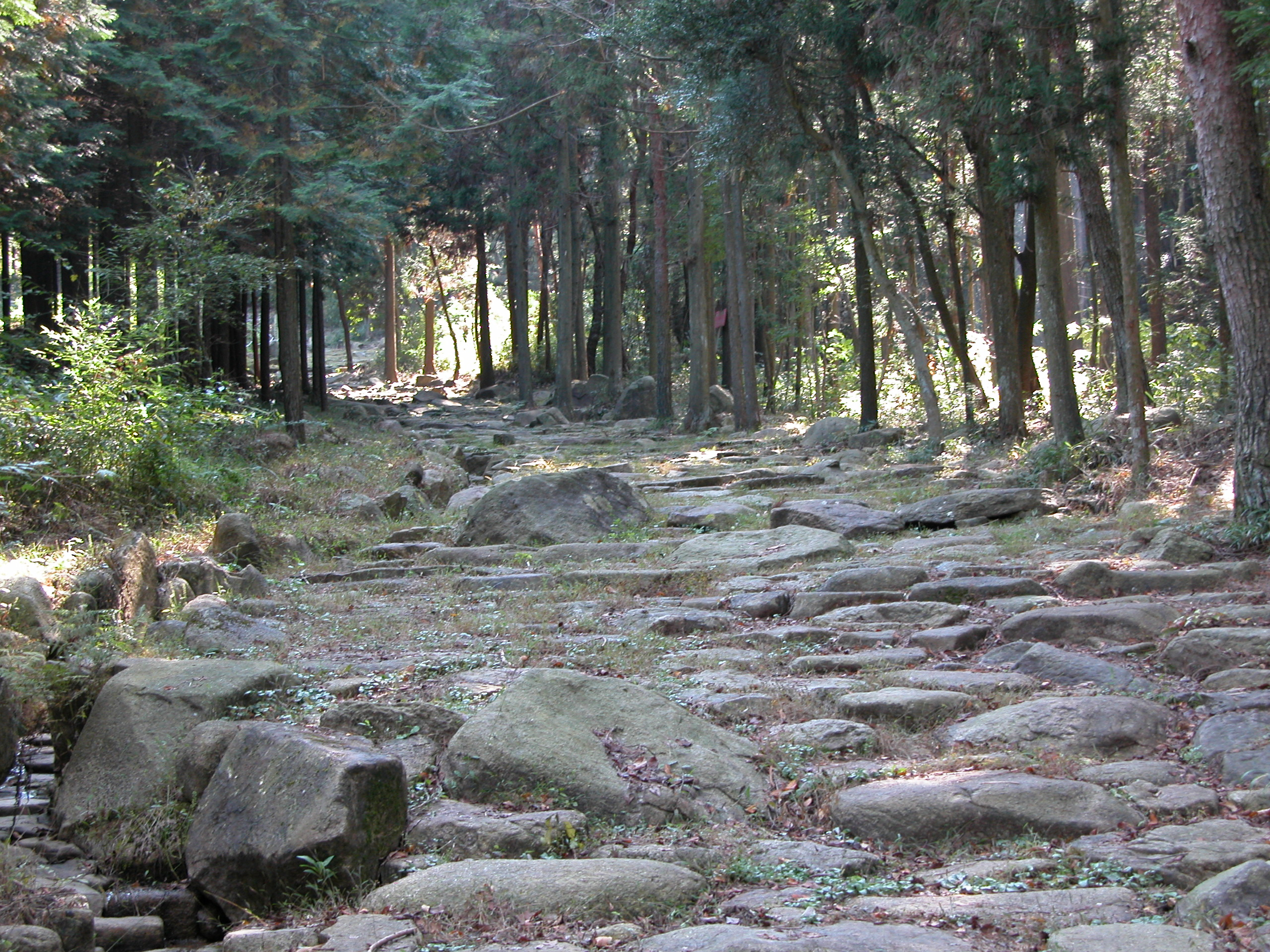
Original ishidatami (stone paving) on the Nakasendō

== Stations of the Nakasendō ==
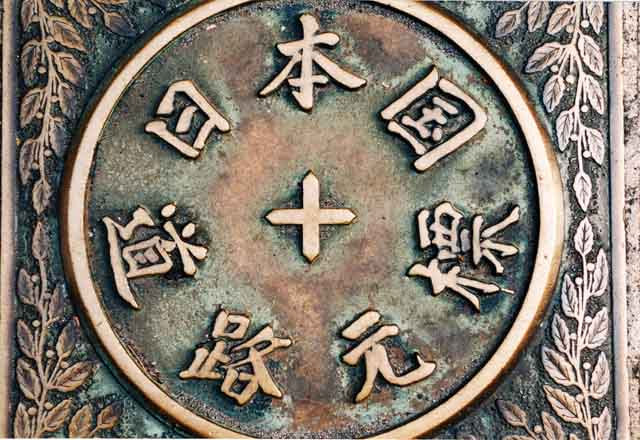
Nihonbashi's highway distance marker

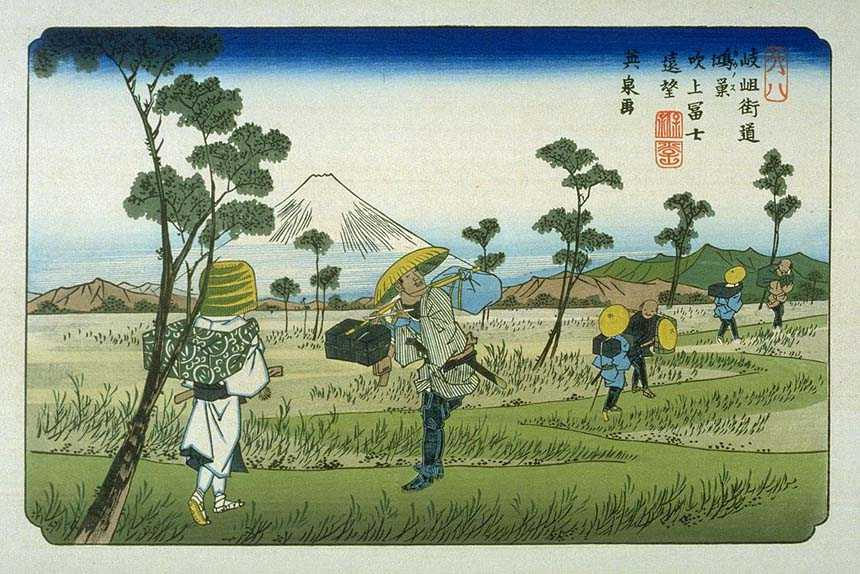
Keisai Eisen's print of Kōnosu-shuku (The Sixty-nine Stations of the Kiso Kaidō)

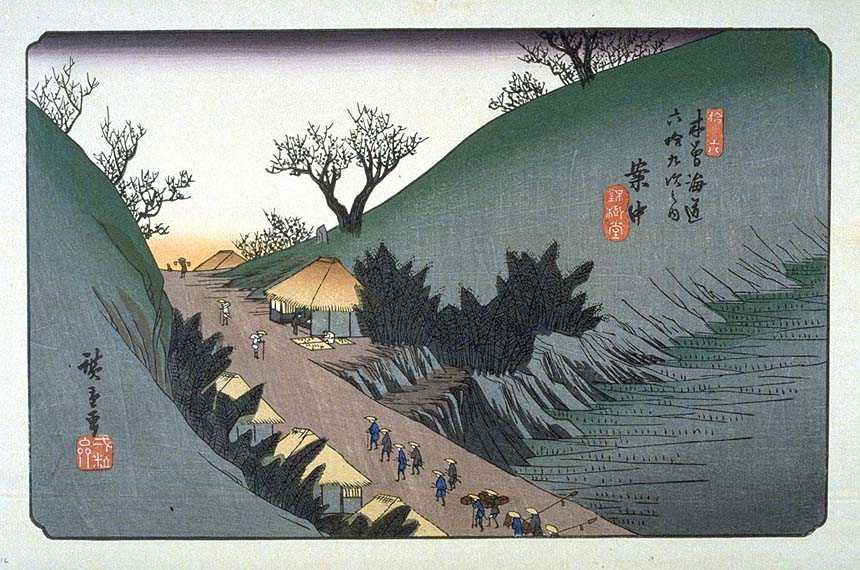
Hiroshige's print of Annaka-shuku

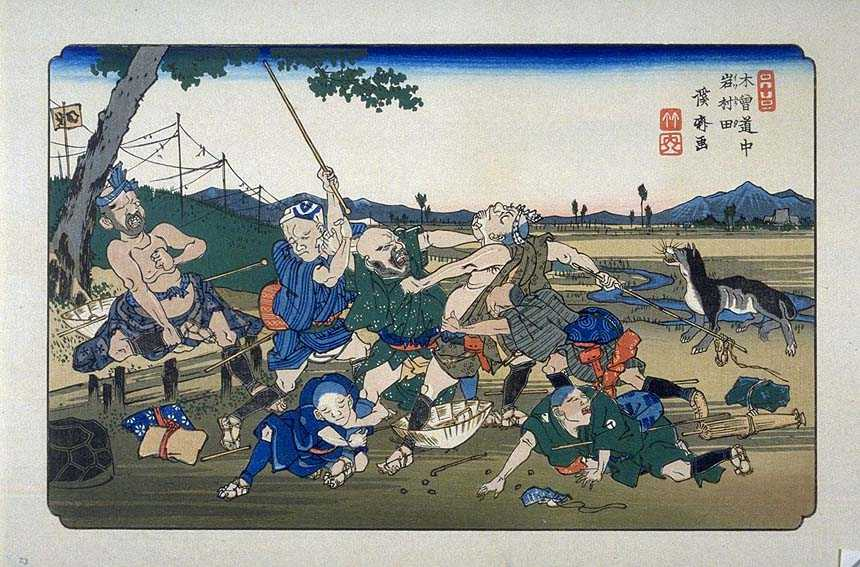
Eisen's print of Iwamurada-shuku

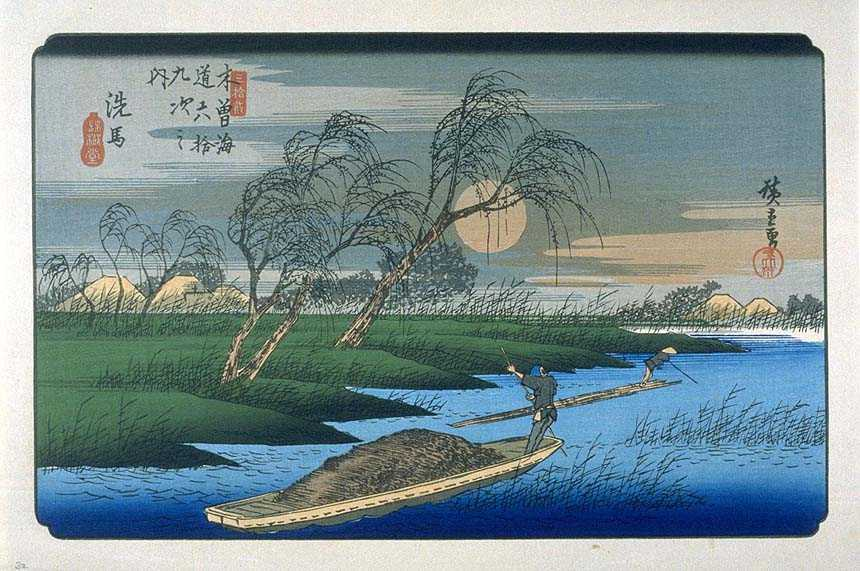
Hiroshige's print of Seba-juku

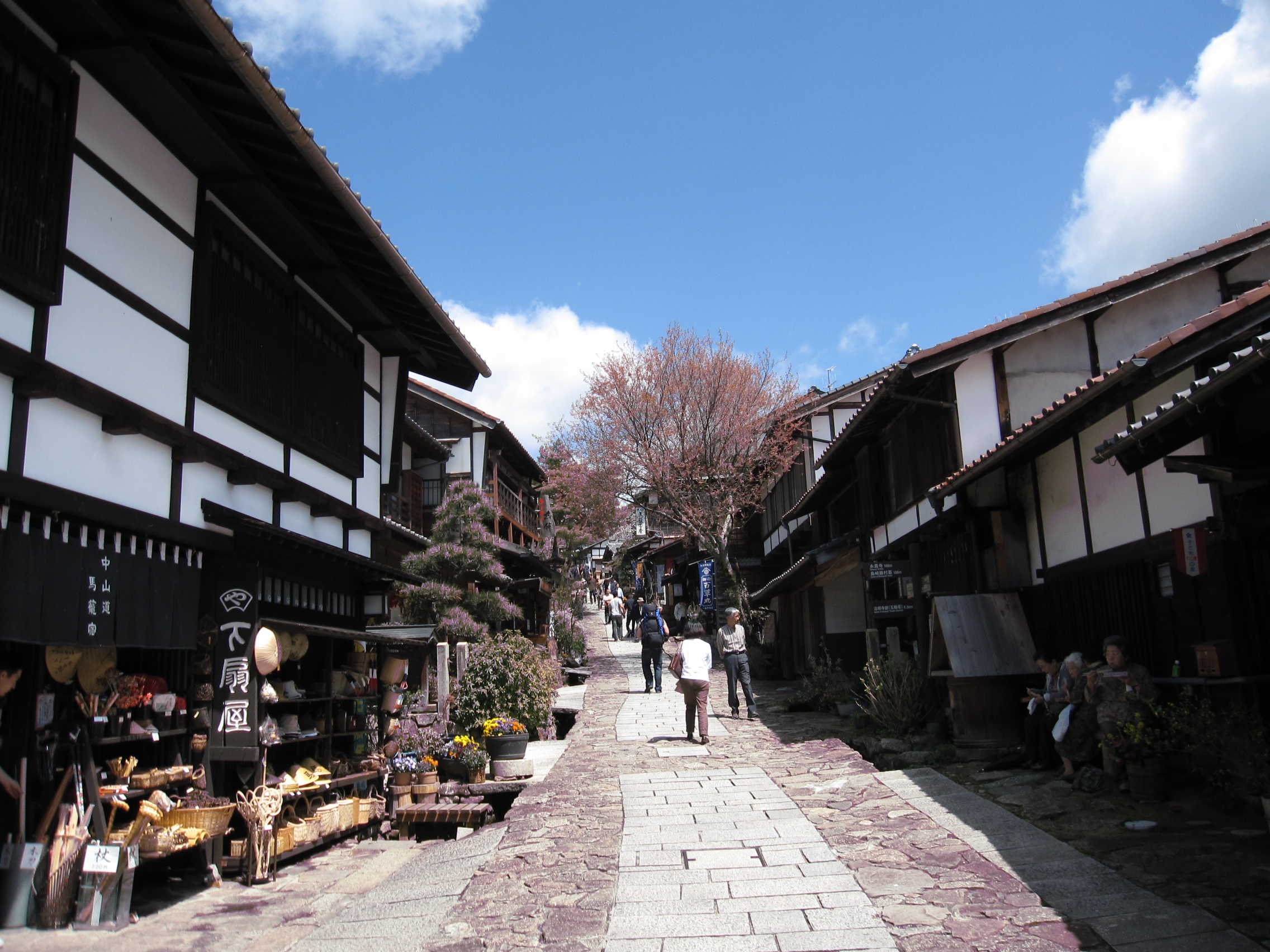
Main street through Magome-juku

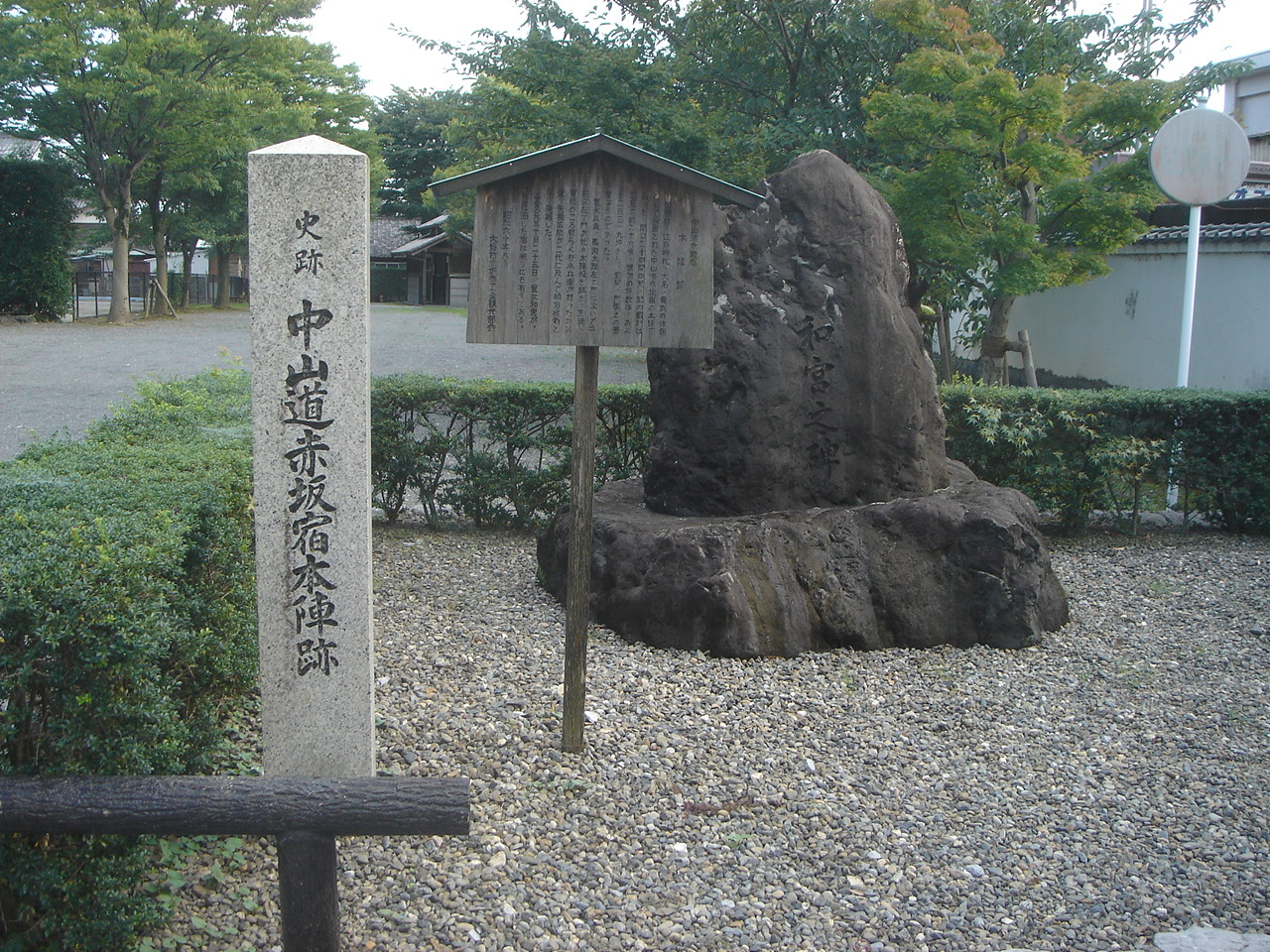
Marker for Akasaka-juku's honjin

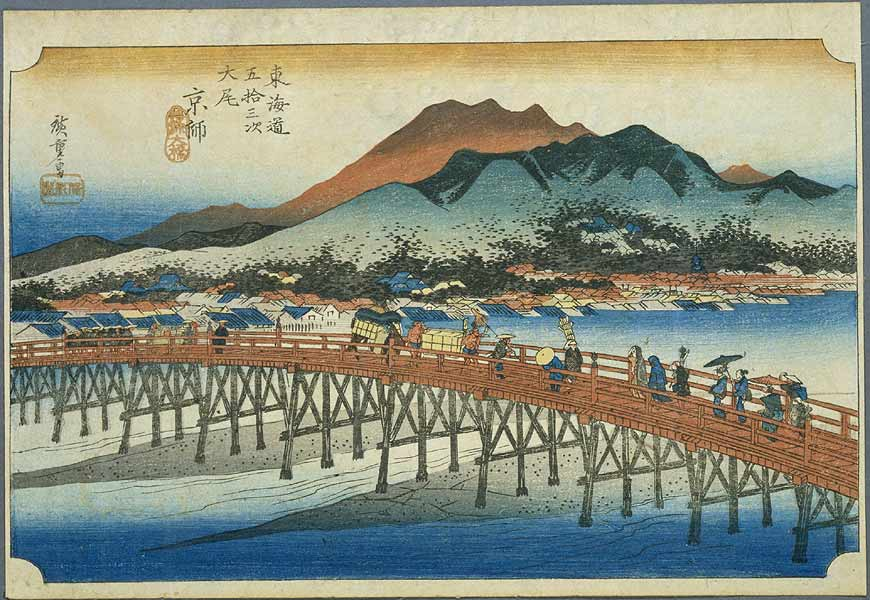
Hiroshige's print of Sanjō Ōhashi

The sixty-nine stations of the Nakasendō, in addition to the starting and ending locations (which are shared with the Tōkaidō), are listed below in order. The stations are divided by their present-day prefecture and include the name of their present-day city/town/village/district.

=== Tokyo ===
Starting location: Nihonbashi (Chūō-ku)
1. Itabashi-shuku (Itabashi)

=== Saitama Prefecture ===
2. Warabi-shuku (Warabi)
3. Urawa-shuku (Urawa-ku, Saitama)
4. Ōmiya-shuku (Ōmiya-ku, Saitama)
5. Ageo-shuku (Ageo)
6. Okegawa-shuku (Okegawa)
7. Kōnosu-shuku (Kōnosu)
8. Kumagai-shuku (Kumagaya)
9. Fukaya-shuku (Fukaya)
10. Honjō-shuku (Honjō)

=== Gunma Prefecture ===
11. Shinmachi-shuku (Takasaki)
12. Kuragano-shuku (Takasaki) (also part of the Nikkō Reiheishi Kaidō)
13. Takasaki-shuku (Takasaki)
14. Itahana-shuku (Annaka)
15. Annaka-shuku (Annaka)
16. Matsuida-shuku (Annaka)
17. Sakamoto-shuku (Annaka)

=== Nagano Prefecture ===
18. Karuisawa-shuku (Karuizawa, Kitasaku District)
19. Kutsukake-shuku (Karuizawa, Kitasaku District)
20. Oiwake-shuku (Karuizawa, Kitasaku District)
21. Otai-shuku (Miyota, Kitasaku District)
22. Iwamurada-shuku (Saku)
23. Shionada-shuku (Saku)
24. Yawata-shuku (Saku)
25. Mochizuki-shuku (Saku)
26. Ashida-shuku (Tateshina, Kitasaku District)
27. Nagakubo-shuku (Nagawa, Chiisagata District)
28. Wada-shuku (Nagawa, Chiisagata District)
29. Shimosuwa-shuku (Shimosuwa, Suwa District) (also part of the Kōshū Kaidō)
30. Shiojiri-shuku (Shiojiri) (also part of the Shio no Michi)
31. Seba-juku (Shiojiri)
32. Motoyama-juku (Shiojiri)
33. Niekawa-juku (Shiojiri)
34. Narai-juku (Shiojiri)
35. Yabuhara-juku (Kiso (village), Kiso District)
36. Miyanokoshi-juku (Kiso (town), Kiso District)
37. Fukushima-juku (Kiso (town), Kiso District)
38. Agematsu-juku (Agematsu, Kiso District)
39. Suhara-juku (Ōkuwa, Kiso District)
40. Nojiri-juku (Ōkuwa, Kiso District)
41. Midono-juku (Nagiso, Kiso District)
42. Tsumago-juku (Nagiso, Kiso District)

=== Gifu Prefecture ===
43. Magome-juku (Nakatsugawa)
44. Ochiai-juku (Nakatsugawa)
45. Nakatsugawa-juku (Nakatsugawa)
46. Ōi-juku (Ena)
47. Ōkute-juku (Mizunami)
48. Hosokute-juku (Mizunami)
49. Mitake-juku (Mitake, Kani District)
50. Fushimi-juku (Mitake, Kani District)
51. Ōta-juku (Minokamo)
52. Unuma-juku (Kakamigahara)
53. Kanō-juku (Gifu)
54. Gōdo-juku (Gifu)
55. Mieji-juku (Mizuho)
56. Akasaka-juku (Ōgaki)
57. Tarui-juku (Tarui, Fuwa District)
58. Sekigahara-juku (Sekigahara, Fuwa District)
59. Imasu-juku (Sekigahara, Fuwa District)

=== Shiga Prefecture ===
60. Kashiwabara-juku (Maibara)
61. Samegai-juku (Maibara)
62. Banba-juku (Maibara)
63. Toriimoto-juku (Hikone)
64. Takamiya-juku (Hikone)
65. Echigawa-juku (Aishō, Echi District)
66. Musa-juku (Ōmihachiman)
67. Moriyama-juku (Moriyama)
68. Kusatsu-juku (Kusatsu) (also part of the Tōkaidō)
69. Ōtsu-juku (Ōtsu) (also part of the Tōkaidō)

=== Kyoto Prefecture ===
Ending location: Sanjō Ōhashi (Higashiyama-ku, Kyoto)

== Ai no Shuku ==
Ai no shuku (intermediate area) are intermediate rest areas along Japan's historical routes. Because they are not official post stations, normal travelers were generally not allowed to stay at them. Here are some of the ai no shuku along the Nakasendō:

- Fukiage-shuku, between Kōnosu-juku and Kumagai-juku (Kōnosu, Saitama Prefecture)
- Motai-shuku, between Mochizuki-shuku and Ashida-shuku (Saku, Nagano Prefecture)
- Shinkanō-juku, between Unuma-juku and Kanō-juku (Kakamigahara, Gifu Prefecture)

== See also ==
- Edo Five Routes
  - 53 Stations of the Tōkaidō
  - 44 Stations of the Kōshū Kaidō
  - 27 Stations of the Ōshū Kaidō
  - 21 Stations of the Nikkō Kaidō
- Other Routes
  - 17 Stations of the Hokkoku Kaidō
  - 11 Stations of the Kisoji
  - 35 Stations of the Mikuni Kaidō
