= Ōi-juku =

Pre-modern Japan post-station along highway

Ōi-juku 大井宿
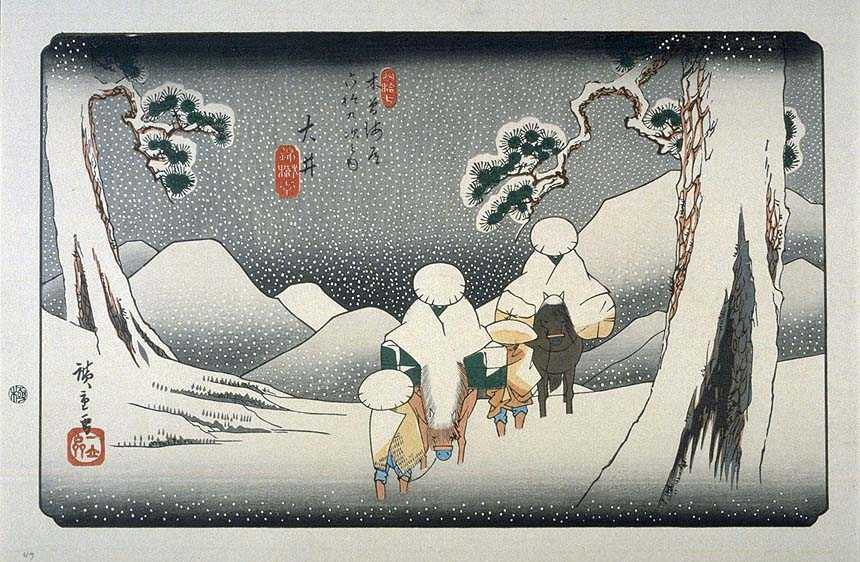
- Hiroshige's print of Ōi-juku, part of the Sixty-nine Stations of the Kiso Kaidō series

General information
- Location: Ena, Gifu (former Mino Province); Japan
- Coordinates: 35°27′19.73″N 137°24′55.23″E
- Elevation: 275 m (902 ft)
- System: post station
- Line: Nakasendō
- Distance: 345.0 km from Edo
Location
- Location within Gifu Prefecture Location within Japan

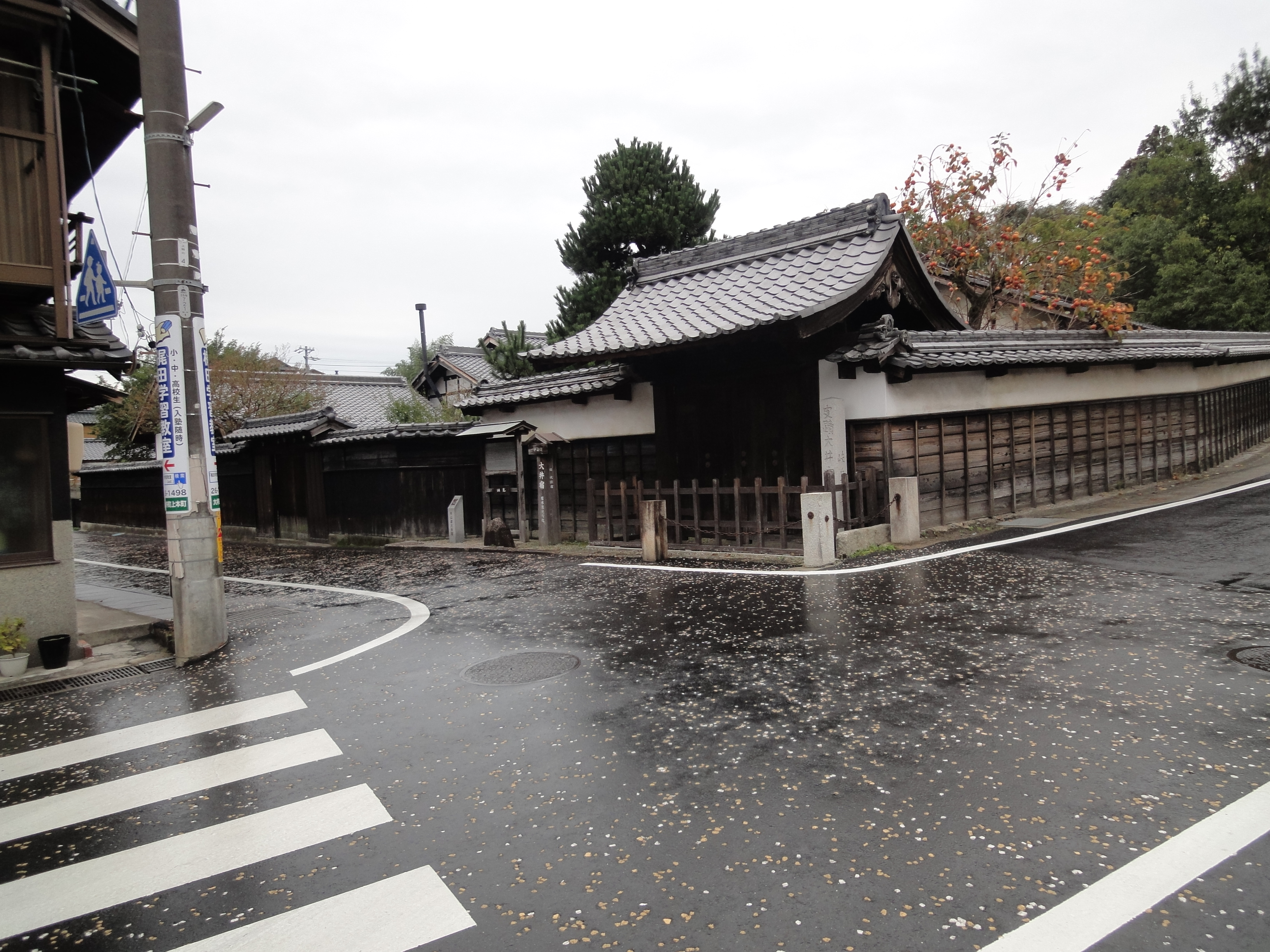
Ōi-juku's honjin (本陣)

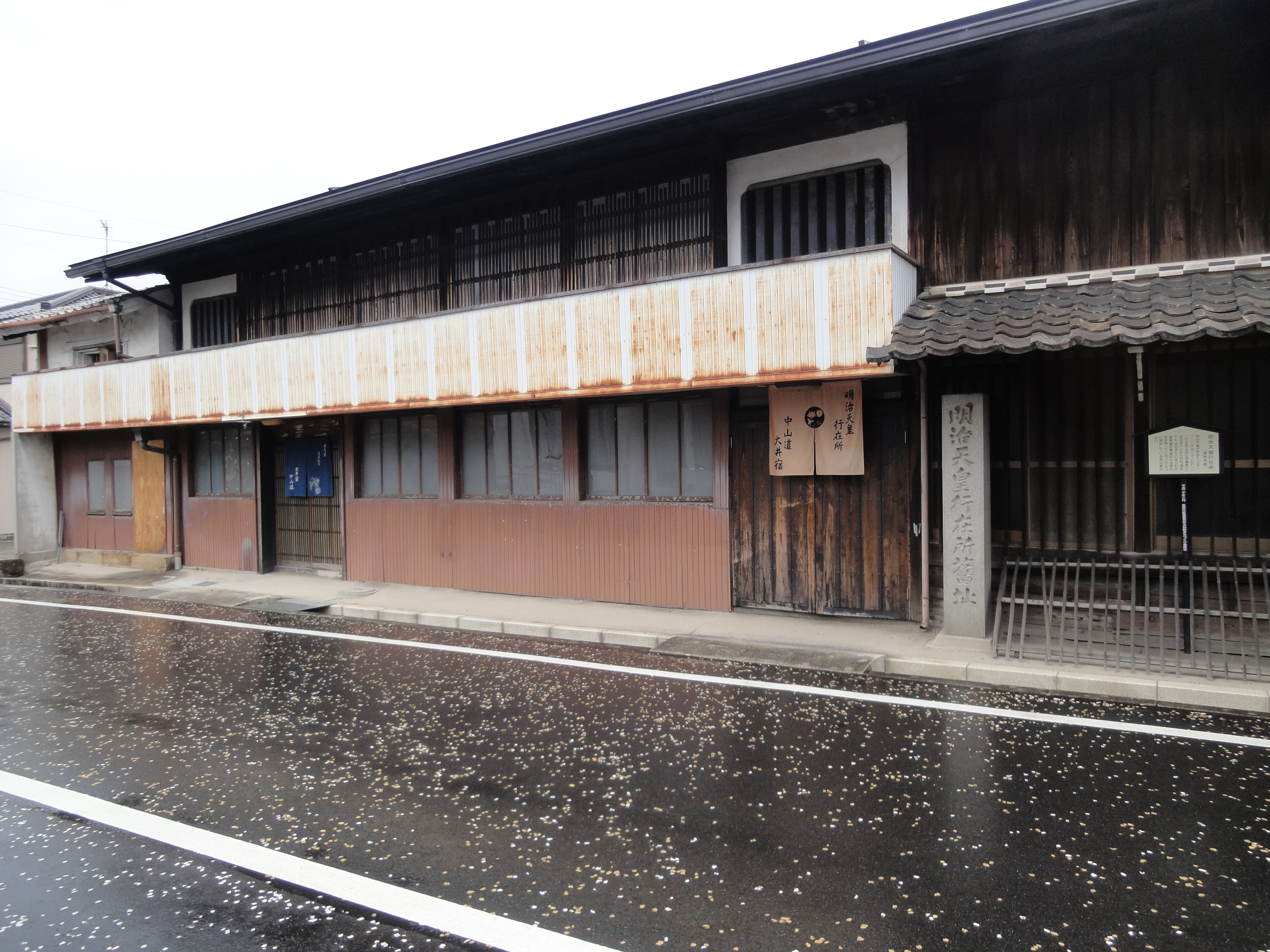
Ōi-juku's anzaisho (行在所) was converted from a hatago (旅籠) to host Emperor Meiji in 1880.

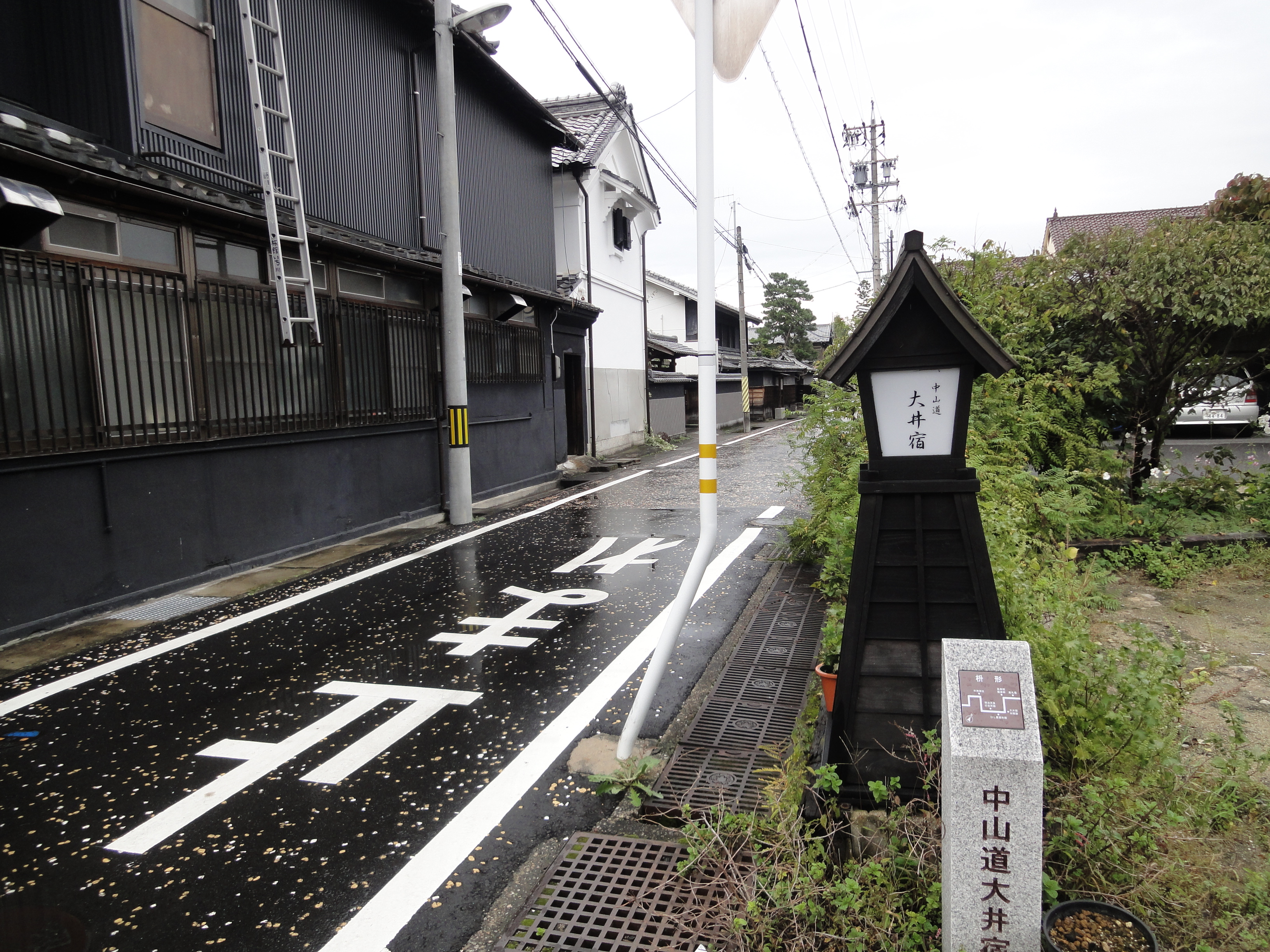
Ōi-juku's road marker

Ōi-juku (大井宿, Ōi-juku) was the forty-sixth of the sixty-nine stations of the Nakasendō connecting Edo with Kyoto in Edo period Japan. It is located in former Mino Province in what is now part of the city of Ena, Gifu Prefecture, Japan. From Ōi-juku to the next post town, Ōkute-juku, there are 13 hills to pass over. Travellers using the Shitakaidō (下街道) often used Ōi-juku, too, as they travelled on to Makiganetsui (槙ヶ根追) afterwards.

== History ==
Ōi-juku is located in the southern foothills of the Japanese Alps, near the banks of the Agi River. It consisted of five sections (named Yoko-chō, Hon-machi, Tate-machi, Chaya-chō and Hashiba) which were laid out at right angles, forming a pattern similar to that of five Masugata-style gates typically found on Japanese castles. While this gave it a very ordered appearance, travelers entering each section of town left that section by a road at a right angle to the entrance, making it very inconvenient and difficult to navigate in a hurry. This was done on purpose to slow down any attacker, as the post station was also a castle town for Iwamura Castle, which dominates a hill overlooking the town.

Per the 1843 "中山道宿村大概帳" (Nakasendō Shukuson Taigaichō) guidebook issued by the Inspector of Highways (道中奉行, Dōchu-būgyō), the town had a population of 466 people in 110 houses, including one honjin, one waki-honjin, and 41 hatago. Ōi-juku is 345.0 kilometers from Edo.

Parts of Ōi-juku are relatively well-preserved, and several old buildings from the post station have survived to the present day, including one of the hatago and several machiya. However, the honjin was destroyed in 1946 and only the gate and the outside walls now remain. The road itself has preserved its original width and the six Masugata bends are still discernible. The town also has an art museum, the Nakasendō Hiroshige Art Museum (中山道広重美術館) with displays of ukiyoe depicting the Nakasendō.

== Ōi-juku in The Sixty-nine Stations of the Kiso Kaidō ==
Utagawa Hiroshige's ukiyo-e print of Ōi-juku dates from 1835 -1838. The print depicts a frigid winter scene, as the area was noted for its heavy snows. Two travelers on horseback and two on foot struggle through the snow, with pine trees on either side denoting the edges of the road. In front are the snow-covered Kiso Mountains and the post station itself is not shown.

== Neighboring post towns ==
Nakasendō
Nakatsugawa-juku - Ōi-juku - Ōkute-juku
