= Fukushima-juku =

Post station used largely during the Edo period of Japan (1603–1868)

Fukushima-juku 福島宿
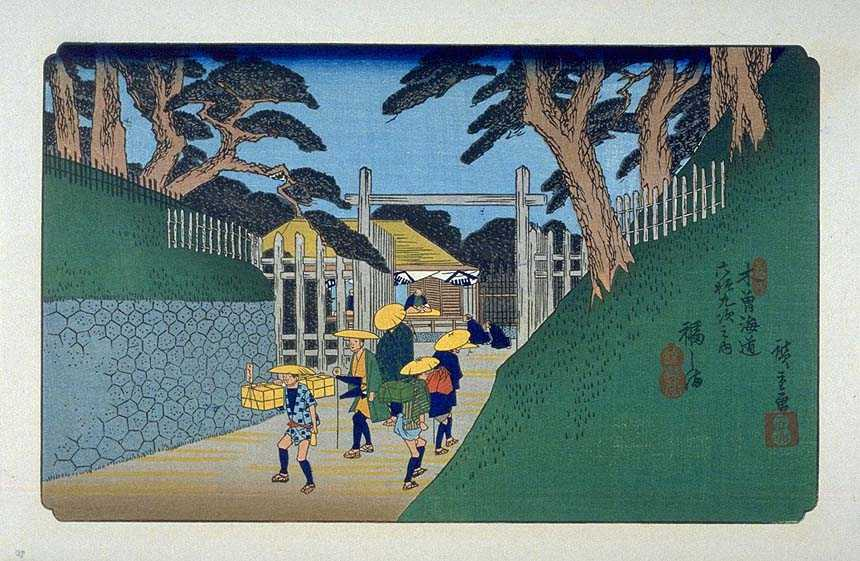
- Utagawa Hiroshige's print of Fukushima-juku, part of the Sixty-nine Stations of the Kiso Kaidō series

General information
- Location: Kiso-machi, Kiso-gun, Nagano-ken; Japan
- Coordinates: 35°51′03″N 137°42′09″E
- Lines: Nakasendō, Kisoji
- Distance: 70 ri from Edo
Location
- Location within Nagano Prefecture Location within Japan
Notes
- National Historic Site of Japan

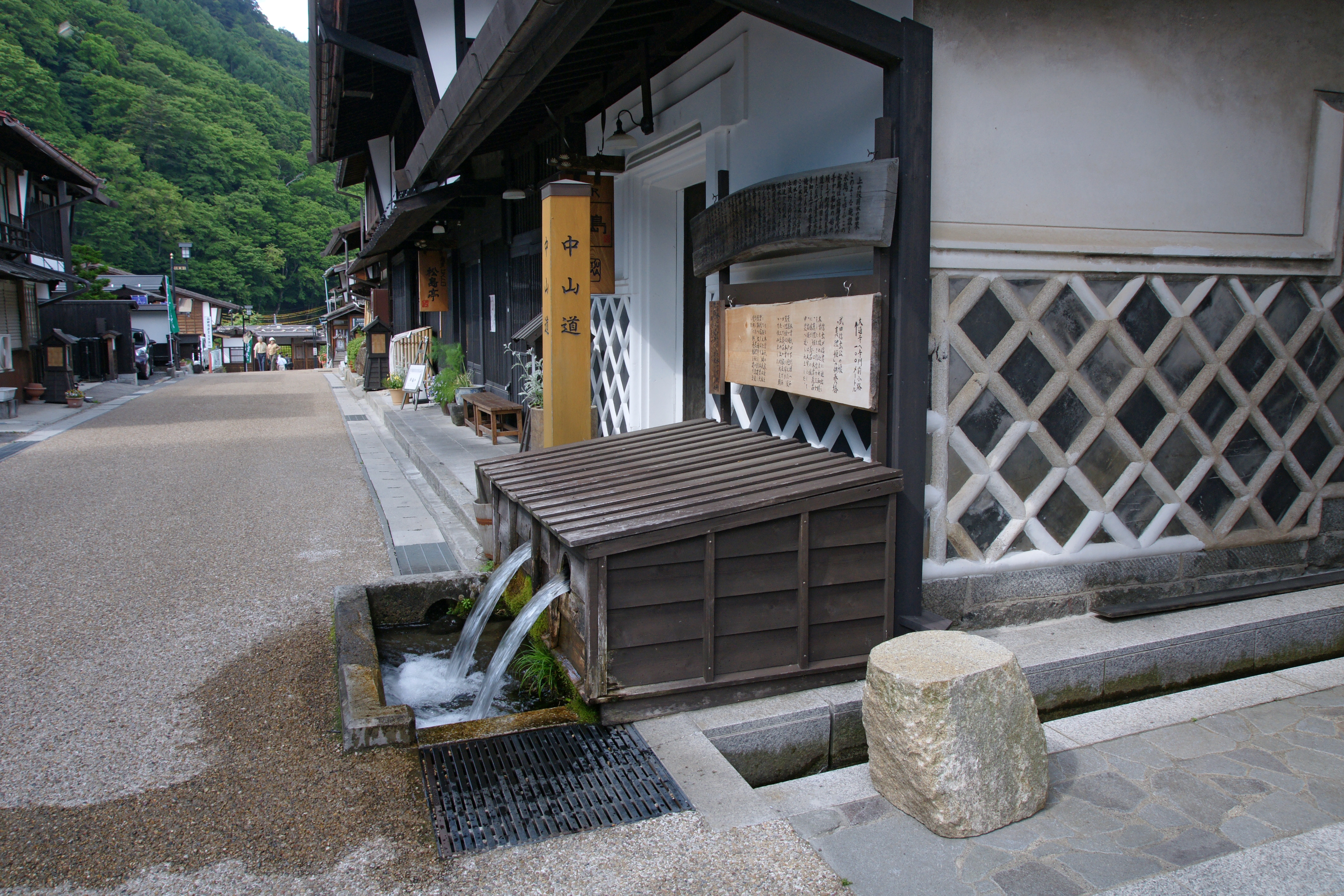
Nakasendō Uenodan

Fukushima-juku (福島宿, Fukushima-juku) was the thirty-seventh of the sixty-nine stations of the Nakasendō highway connecting Edo with Kyoto during the Edo period. It was located in the present-day city of Kiso, in the Kiso District of Nagano Prefecture, Japan. It was also numbered as the fifth of eleven stations on the Kisoji highway.

== History ==
A settlement for travelers existed in this location since at least the Eiroku era (1558–1570) of the Sengoku period, as it was located approximately at the midpoint of the route between Kyoto and Edo, and midpoint on the Kisoji. During the Edo period, the post station was greatly enlarged as it became the seat of a daikan administrator appointed by the Tokugawa shogunate to oversee one of the four major checkpoints for regulation of travelers on the Nakasendō.

Per an 1843 guidebook issued by the Inspector of Highways (道中奉行, Dōchu-būgyō), the town stretched for about 1.1 kilometers along the highway, with a population of 972 in 158 houses, with one honjin, one waki-honjin, and 14 hatago. Fukushima-shuku was approximately 2 ri, 14-chō (18.8 kilometers) from Agematsu-juku.

=== Fukushima Barrier ===
The Fukushima Barrier (福島関跡, Fukushima Sekishō) was one of several security checkpoints established by the Tokugawa Shogunate on the Nakasendō. Located at the northern end of Fukushima-juku, the site of the barrier approximately a 15-minute walk from Kiso-Fukushima Station. The barrier was founded between 1602 and 1604, and had stone walls and a building for officials who could monitor traffic and inspect travelers for their travel permits and illicit goods. It was abolished in 1868 after the Meiji restoration, but the east and west gates of the compound were reconstructed based on archaeological excavations conducted in 1975, and now form part of a historical park. The site was designated a National Historic Site of Japan in 1979.

== Fukushima-shuku in The Sixty-nine Stations of the Kiso Kaidō ==
Utagawa Hiroshige's ukiyo-e print of Fukushima-juku depicts the Fukushima Barrier, with two travelers in the background kneeling before an official as their documents are examined. In the foreground, a porter with loaded panniers passes in front of an elderly samurai with a stick walking away from the barrier. Behind, a man with his face hidden by a large green cloak and a sedge hat and two travellers approach the gate.

== Neighboring Post Towns ==
Nakasendō & Kisoji

- Miyanokoshi-juku – Fukushima-juku – Agematsu-juku

== See also ==
- List of Historic Sites of Japan (Nagano)
- Arai Barrier
