= Mikuni Kaidō =

Ancient highway in Japan

Mikuni Kaidō (三国街道) was an ancient highway in Japan that stretched from Takasaki-juku (present day Gunma Prefecture) on the Nakasendō to Teradomari-juku (present day Niigata Prefecture) on the Hokurikudō.

== History ==
The Mikuni Pass separated the Kantō region from Echigo Province in ancient Japan. As such, it has long been used as a major transportation hub for travelers going between those two areas. During the Edo period, the Mikuni Kaidō was established with the purpose of helping daimyō who were participating in sankin kōtai, which required daimyō to spend a portion of their time in Edo.

In 1902, the Shin'etsu Main Line was built, the first train line through the area. As a result, the economies of many of the post towns began to falter. However, the area between Nagaoka and Yuzawa was able to continue to flourish because the flat land allowed them to pursue agriculture. The area across the Mikuni Pass, however, received very little traffic.

In 1953, as cars became more common, so did long-distance transport, which led to a great rise in traffic in the area. However, for cars traveling between the Kantō and Echigo regions, it was very inconvenient to take the same detour as the train line, so the prefecture began major repair and construction work along the Mikuni Kaidō.

== Modern Route ==
The Mikuni Kaidō's path can be followed today by a large portion of National Route 17, or by the portions of the Kan-Etsu Expressway or the Jōetsu Shinkansen that stretch from the Kantō region to Niigata.

== Stations on the Mikuni Kaidō ==
There are 35 post stations along the Mikuni Kaidō.

=== Gunma Prefecture ===
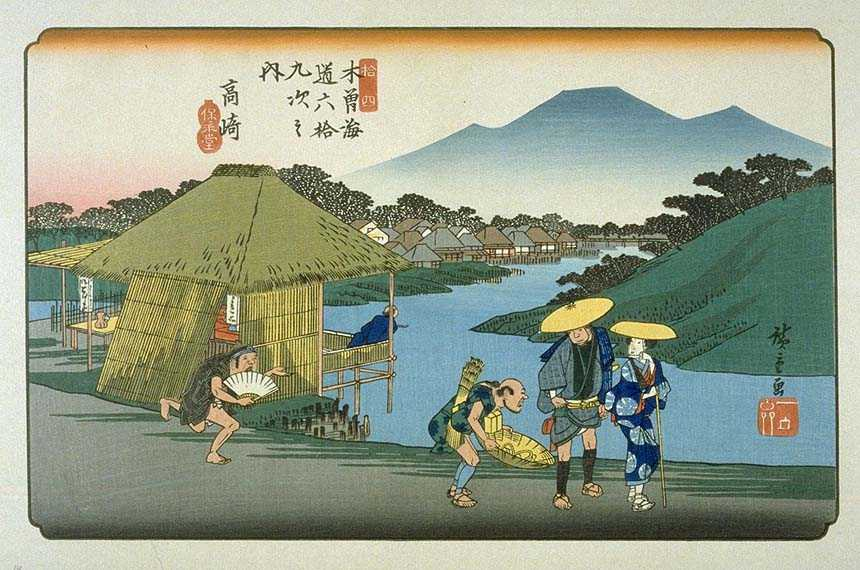
Hiroshige's print of Takasaki-shuku, part of The Sixty-nine Stations of the Kiso Kaidō series

1. Takasaki-shuku (高崎宿) (Takasaki) (starting location)
2. Kaneko-shuku (金古宿) (Takasaki)
3. Shibukawa-shuku (渋川宿) (Shibukawa)
4. Kanai-shuku (金井宿) (Shibukawa)
5. Kitamoku-shuku (北牧宿) (Shibukawa)
6. Yokobori-shuku (横堀宿) (Shibukawa)
7. Nakayama-shuku (中山宿) (Takayama, Agatsuma District)
8. Tsukahara-shuku (塚原宿) (Minakami, Tone District)
9. Shimoshinda-shuku (下新田宿) (Minakami, Tone District)
10. Fuse-shuku (布施宿) (Minakami, Tone District)
11. Ima-shuku (今宿) (Minakami, Tone District)
12. Sukawa-shuku (須川宿) (Minakami, Tone District)
13. Aimata-shuku (相俣宿) (Minakami, Tone District)
14. Sarugakyō-shuku (猿ヶ京宿) (Minakami, Tone District)
15. Fukuro-shuku (吹路宿) (Minakami, Tone District)
16. Nagai-shuku (永井宿) (Minakami, Tone District)

=== Niigata Prefecture ===
17. Asagai-shuku (浅貝宿) (Yuzawa, Minamiuonuma District)
18. Futai-shuku (二居宿) (Yuzawa, Minamiuonuma District)
19. Mitsumata-shuku (三俣宿) (Yuzawa, Minamiuonuma District)
20. Yuzaka-shuku (湯沢宿) (Yuzawa, Minamiuonuma District)
21. Seki-shuku (関宿) (Minamiuonuma)
22. Shiozawa-shuku (塩沢宿) (Minamiuonuma)
23. Muikamachi-shuku (六日町宿) (Minamiuonuma)
24. Itsukamachi-shuku (五日町宿) (Minamiuonuma)
25. Urasa-shuku (浦佐宿) (Minamiuonuma)
26. Horinouchi-shuku (堀之内宿) (Uonuma)
27. Kawaguichi-shuku (川口宿) (Nagaoka)
28. Myōken-shuku (妙見宿) (Nagaoka)
29. Muikaichi-shuku (六日市宿) (Nagaoka)
30. Nagaoka-shuku (長岡宿) (Nagaoka)
31. Yoita-shuku (与板宿) (Nagaoka)
32. Jizōdō-shuku (地蔵堂宿) (Tsubame)
33. Sekinakashima-shuku (関中島宿) (Tsubame)
34. Watabe-shuku (渡部宿) (Tsubame)
35. Teradomari-shuku (寺泊宿) (Nagaoka) (ending location)

== See also ==
- Edo Five Routes
  - Tōkaidō (or 53 Stations of the Tōkaidō)
  - Nakasendō (or 69 Stations of the Nakasendō)
  - Kōshū Kaidō
  - Ōshū Kaidō
  - Nikkō Kaidō
- Other Routes
  - Hokkoku Kaidō
  - Kisoji
