= Imasu-juku =

Pre-modern Japan post-station along highway

Coordinates: 35°20′54.7″N 136°26′46″E

Imasu-juku 今須宿
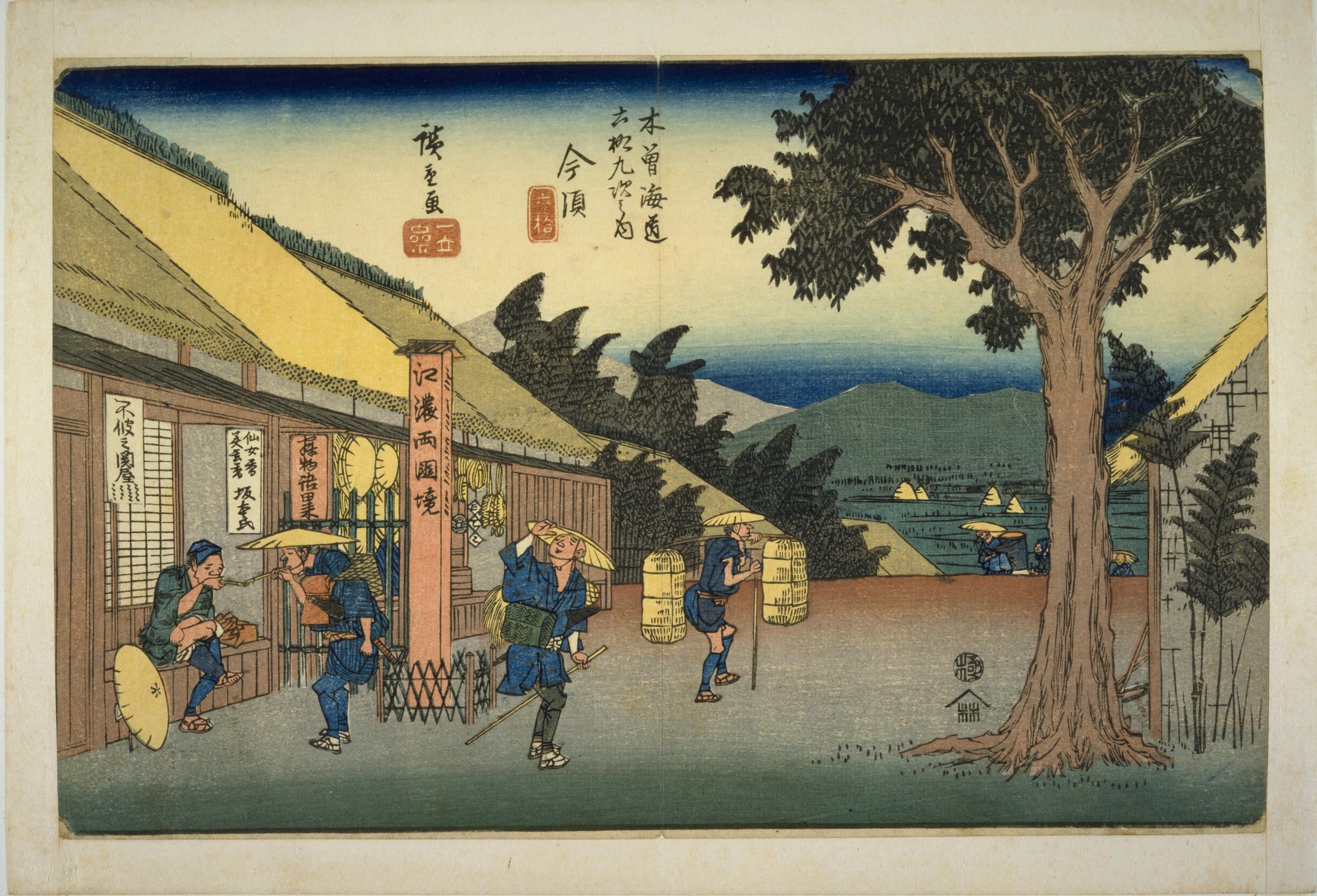
- Hiroshige's print of Imasu-juku, part of the Sixty-nine Stations of the Kiso Kaidō series

General information
- Location: Sekigahara, Gifu (former Mino Province); Japan
- Elevation: 162 m (531 ft)
- System: post station
- Line: Nakasendō
- Distance: 447 km from Edo
Location
- Location within Gifu Prefecture Location within Japan

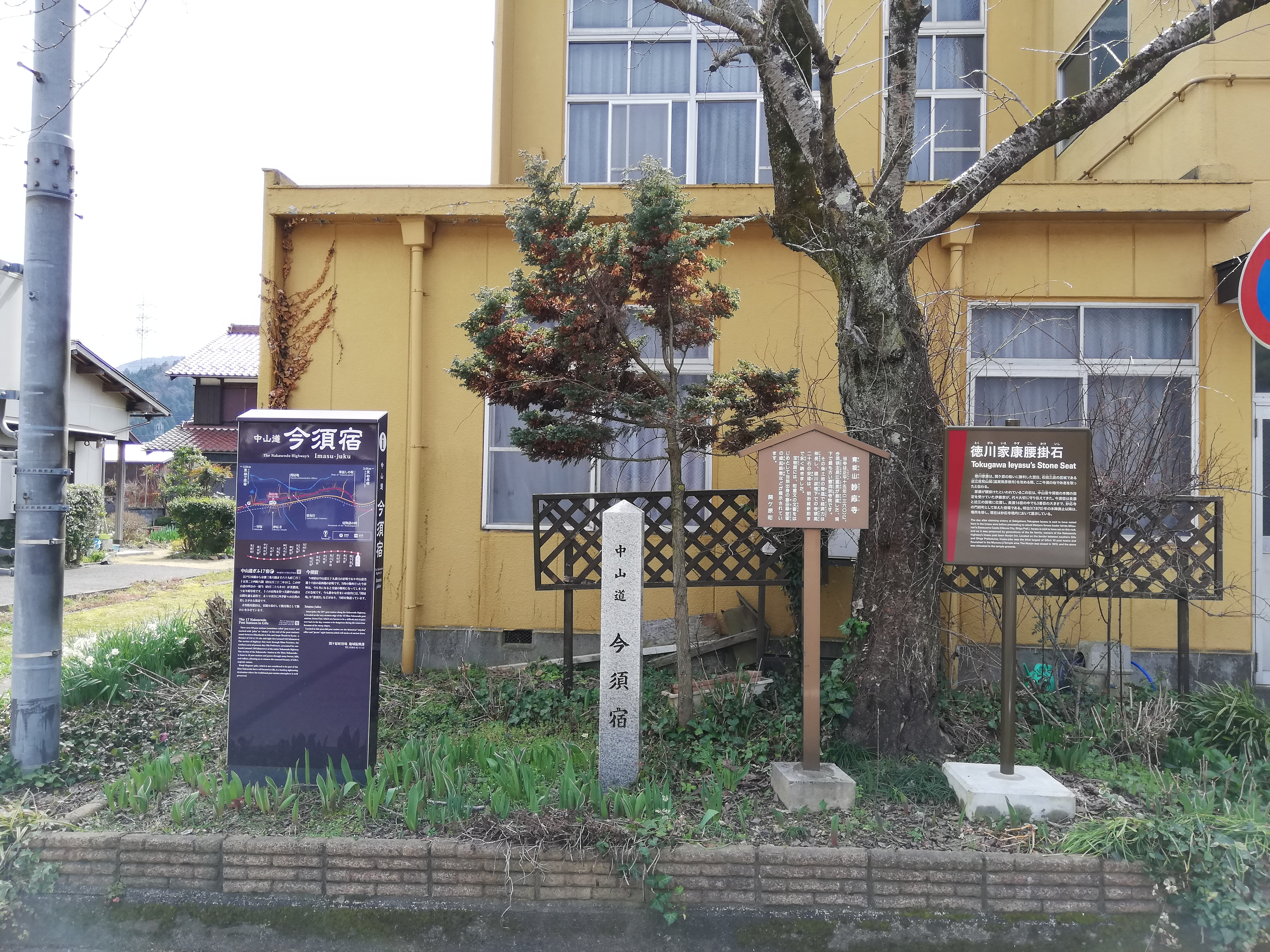
site of Imasu-juku

Imasu-juku (今須宿, Imasu-juku) was the fifty-ninth of the sixty-nine stations of the Nakasendō connecting Edo with Kyoto in Edo period Japan. It is located in former Mino Province in what is now part of the town of Sekigahara, Fuwa District, Gifu Prefecture, Japan.

== History ==
Imasu-juku was located on the ancient Tōsandō highway connecting the capital of Heian-kyō with the provinces of eastern Japan, and near the border of Ōmi Province with Mino Province.

In the early Edo period, the system of post stations on the Nakasendō was formalized by the Tokugawa shogunate in 1602, and it was a stopping place for traveling merchants (Ōmi shōnin (近江商人)) who originated from Ōmi Province. It was also on the sankin-kōtai route used by various western daimyō to-and-from the Shogun's court in Edo. It was also on the Kurihangaidō (九里半街道), a trade road that connected the northwestern shores of Lake Biwa with Obama. Imasu is 447 kilometers from Edo. Nearby Sekigahara Pass has some of the heaviest snowfalls in Japan, and travelers trapped by early snowfall in autumn were forced to spend time at Imazu until the road became passable.

Per the 1843 "中山道宿村大概帳" (Nakasendō Shukuson Taigaichō) guidebook issued by the Inspector of Highways (道中奉行, Dōchu-būgyō), the town had a population of 1784 people in 464 houses, including one honjin, two waki-honjin, and 13 hatago.

Following the Meiji restoration, traffic on the Nakasendō all but disappeared; prices increased and in 1869 after a bad harvest, the peasants around Imazu rose in revolt, demanding debt cancellation and the release of stored rice to avoid famine. The station official appealed to Ōgaki Domain, which sent troops to suppress the uprising by force. This was an indication of how Imasu-juku, once quite prosperous, had declined.

== Imasu-juku in The Sixty-nine Stations of the Kiso Kaidō ==
Utagawa Hiroshige's ukiyo-e print of Imasu-juku dates from 1835 -1838. The print emphasizes the location by depicting a border post proclaiming "Mino-Ōmi border". A traveller stops to read this inscription while another gets a light for his pipe from a man seated in front of a teahouse. Above him is a sign promoting “bien Sennjoko”, a cosmetic produced by the patron who subsidized this print series. Farther down the road is a man with two barrels wrapped in straw suspended by a pole over his shoulder, and there are shops for traveller's necessities, such as straw hats and sandals. Several travellers also arriving from the other direction, indicating the busy nature of this post station. In the plains below, crops have been harvested, indicating that the setting is autumn.

== Neighboring post towns ==
Nakasendō
Sekigahara-juku - Imasu-juku - Kashiwabara-juku
