= Iwamurada-shuku =

Coordinates: 36.2726°N 138.4783°E

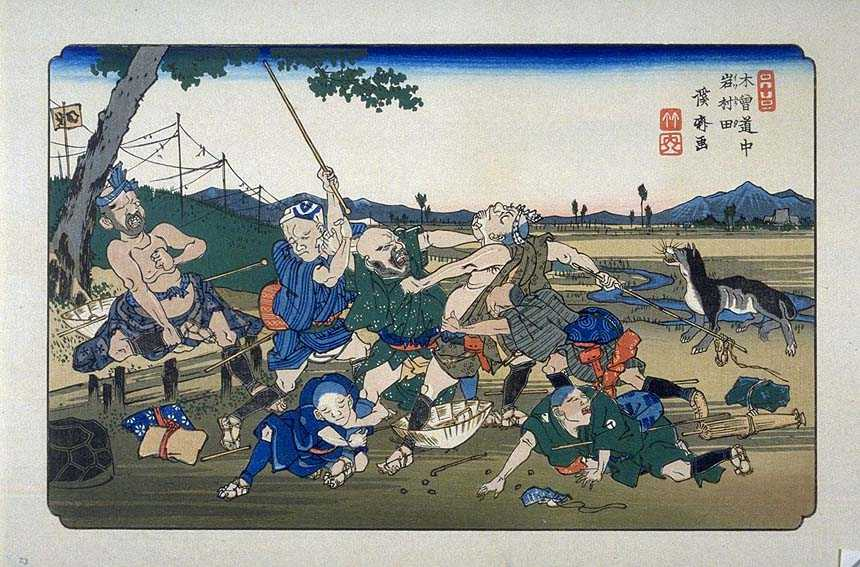
Keisai Eisen's print of Iwamurada-shuku, part of the series The Sixty-nine Stations of the Kiso Kaidō

Iwamurada-shuku (岩村田宿, Iwamurada-shuku) was the twenty-second of the sixty-nine stations of the Nakasendō. It is located in the present-day city of Saku, in Nagano Prefecture, Japan.

== History ==
Originally, Iwamurada-shuku was a castle town for the Iwamurada Han and, as a post town, it never developed a proper honjin, though it did have some smaller inns.

== Neighboring Post Towns ==
Nakasendō
Otai-shuku - Iwamurada-shuku - Shionada-shuku
