= Agematsu-juku =

Rest area along old travel route in Japan

Coordinates: 35°46′47.1″N 137°41′44.0″E

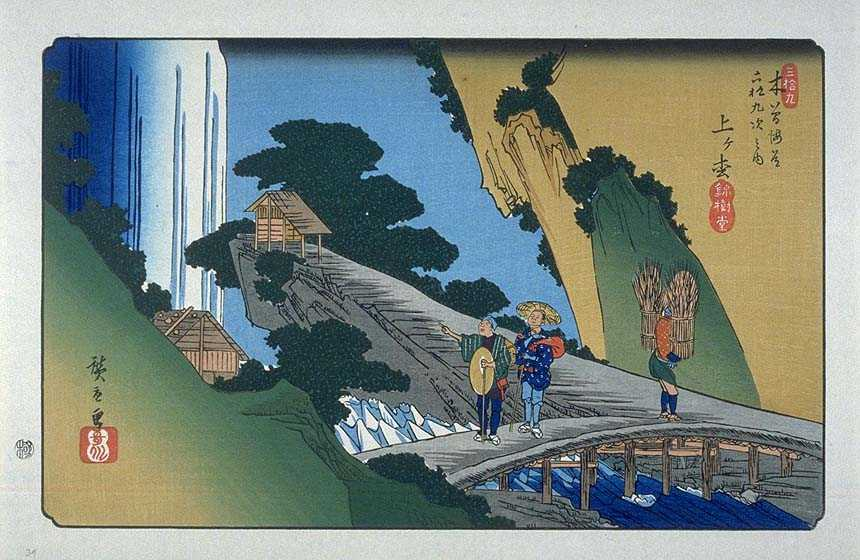
Hiroshige's print of Agematsu-juku, part of the series The Sixty-nine Stations of the Kiso Kaidō

Agematsu-juku (上松宿, Agematsu-juku) was the thirty-eighth of the sixty-nine stations of the Nakasendō, as well as the sixth of eleven stations on the Kisoji. It is located in the present-day town of Agematsu, in the Kiso District of Nagano Prefecture, Japan. From the present-day Jūō Bridge, it runs through the Kan-machi and three other districts, but Edo period row houses from the post town can only be found in Kan-machi. The town originally flourished as a logging town under the protection of the Owari Han.

== Neighboring Post Towns ==
Nakasendō & Kisoji
Fukushima-juku – Agematsu-juku – Suhara-juku
