= Itahana-shuku =

Coordinates: 36.3372°N 138.9309°E

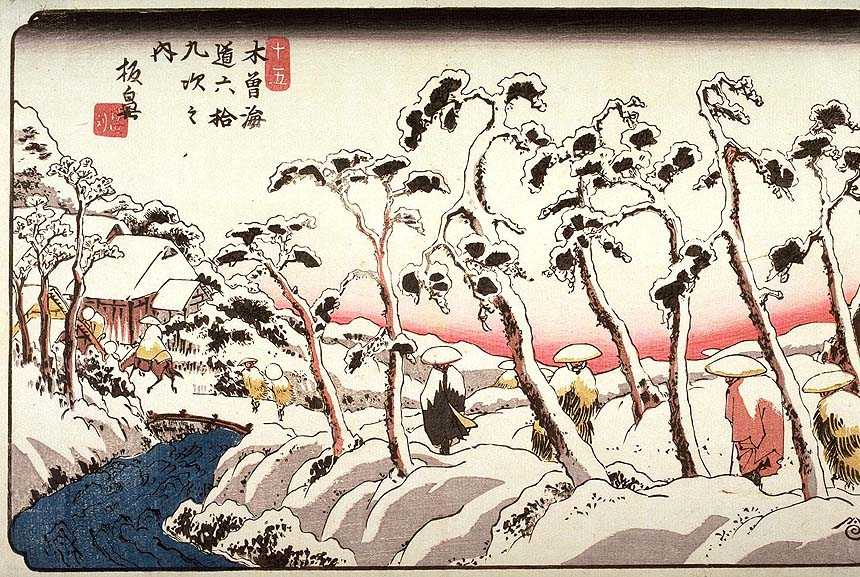
Keisai Eisen's print of Itahana-shuku, part of The Sixty-nine Stations of the Kiso Kaidō series

Itahana-shuku (板鼻宿, Itahana-shuku) was the fourteenth of the sixty-nine stations of the Nakasendō. It is located in the present-day city of Annaka, Gunma Prefecture, Japan. Ruins of its honjin can be found at the Princess Kazunomiya Inn (皇女和宮宿泊 Ōjo Kazunomiya Shukuhaku).

== Neighboring Post Towns ==
Nakasendō
Takasaki-shuku - Itahana-shuku - Annaka-shuku
