= Takasaki-shuku =

Coordinates: 36.3218°N 139.0076°E

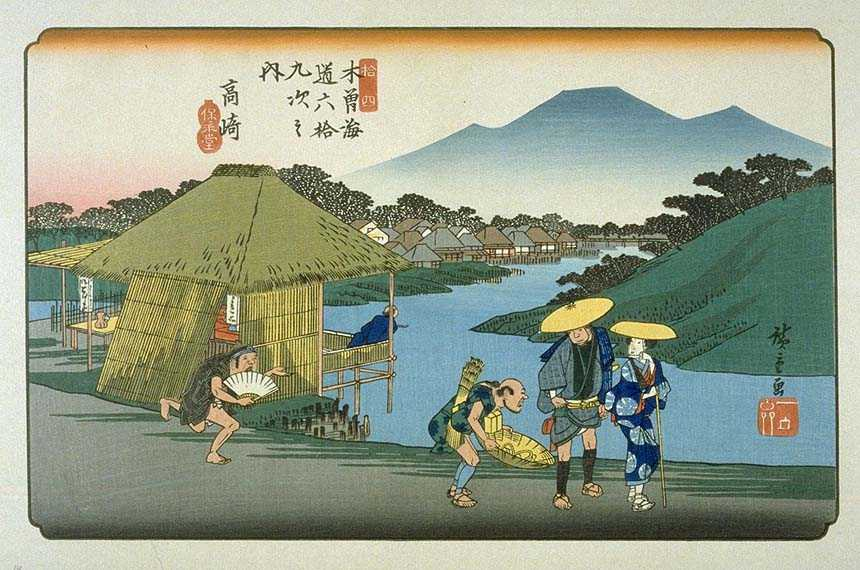
Hiroshige's print of Takasaki-shuku, part of the series The Sixty-nine Stations of the Kiso Kaidō

Takasaki-shuku (高崎宿, Takasaki-shuku) was the thirteenth of the sixty-nine stations of the Nakasendō. It is located in the present-day city of Takasaki, Gunma Prefecture, Japan.

== History ==
Takasaki-shuku was located at the intersection of the Nakasendō and the Mikuni Kaidō. Many buildings and artifacts remain from the Edo period, keeping a lively recreation of the past.

== Neighboring post towns ==
Nakasendō
Kuragano-shuku - Takasaki-shuku - Itahana-shuku
Mikuni Kaidō
Takasaki-shuku (starting location) - Kaneko-shuku
