= 2007 Miyota mayoral election =

Miyota, Nagano held a mayoral election on February 18, 2007. Moteki Yuji won the election, beating incumbent mayor Tsuchiya Kiyoshi.

== Candidates ==
- Moteki Yuji, independent candidate supported by the Japanese Communist Party
- Tsuchiya Kiyoshi, incumbent independent mayor.

== Results ==
Mayoral election 2007: Miyota City
Party	Candidate	Votes	%	±%
Independent, JCP	Moteki Yuji	4,333		
Independent	Tsuchiya Kiyoshi	3,215		
Turnout		7,605	68.61 %	
