= Miyanokoshi-juku =

Coordinates: 35°53′12.9″N 137°45′37.4″E

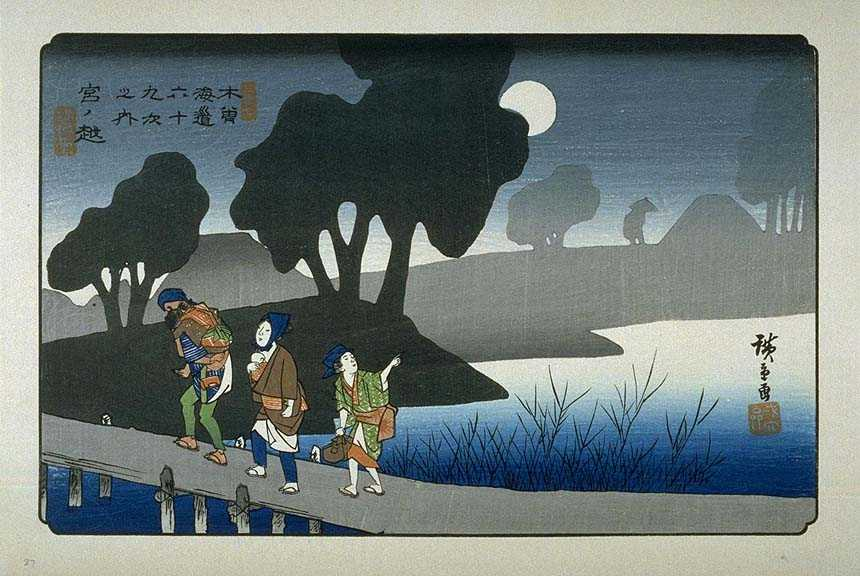
Hiroshige's print of Miyanokoshi-juku, part of the series The Sixty-nine Stations of the Kiso Kaidō

Miyanokoshi-juku (宮ノ越宿, Miyanokoshi-juku) was the thirty-sixth of the sixty-nine stations of the Nakasendō, as well as the fourth of eleven stations on the Kisoji. It is located in the present-day town of Kiso, in the Kiso District of Nagano Prefecture, Japan.

== History ==
Miyanokoshi was the childhood home of Minamoto no Yoshinaka, and there are still many ruins and artifacts related to him to be found in the town. Additionally, it was the birthplace for many Kiso-area carpenters.

== Neighboring Post Towns ==
Nakasendō & Kisoji
Yabuhara-juku - Miyanokoshi-juku - Fukushima-juku
