= Suhara-juku =

Coordinates: 35°41′45.1″N 137°41′32.5″E

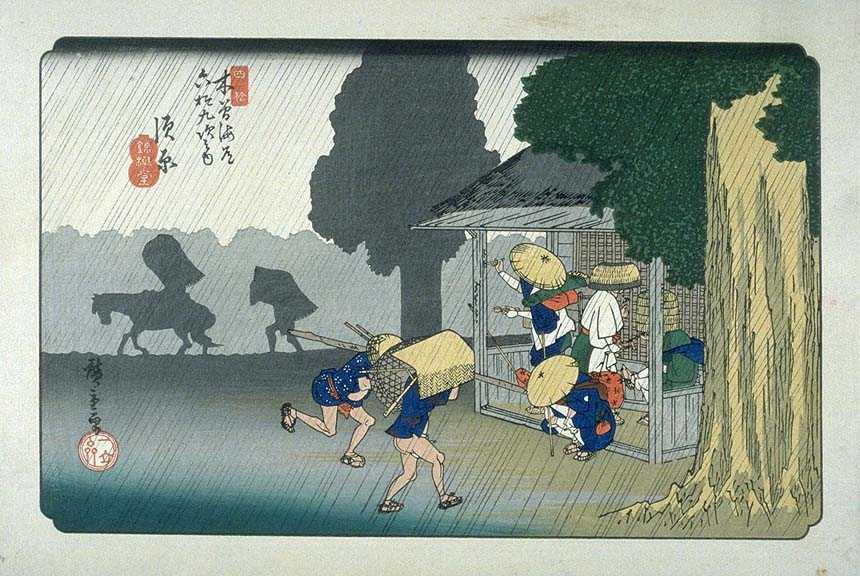
Hiroshige's print of Suhara-juku, part of the series The Sixty-nine Stations of the Kiso Kaidō

Suhara-juku (須原宿, Suhara-juku) was the thirty-ninth of the sixty-nine stations of the Nakasendō, as well as the seventh of eleven stations on the Kisoji. It is located in the present-day village of Ōkuwa, in the Kiso District of Nagano Prefecture, Japan.

== History ==
Of all of the post towns along the Kisoji, Suhara was the first one to be established, though originally at a different location. After the town was washed away by a major flood in 1717, it was moved to its present location.

== Neighboring post towns ==
Nakasendō & Kisoji
Agematsu-juku - Suhara-juku - Nojiri-juku
