= Otai-shuku =

Coordinates: 36°18′22.2″N 138°29′49.6″E

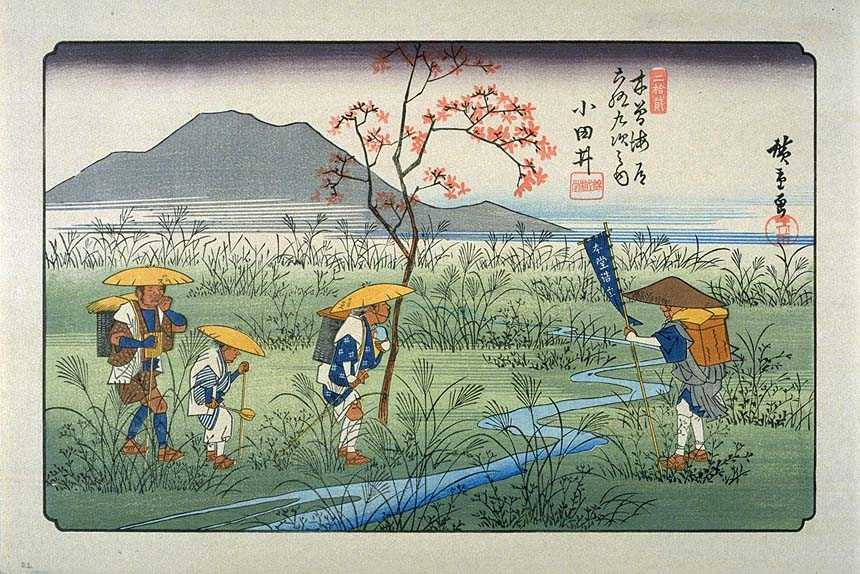
Hiroshige's print of Otai-shuku, part of the series The Sixty-nine Stations of the Kiso Kaidō

Otai-shuku (小田井宿, Otai-shuku) was the twenty-first of the sixty-nine stations of the Nakasendō. It is located in the present-day town of Miyota, in the Kitasaku District of Nagano Prefecture, Japan.

== History ==
Otai-shuku originated between 473 and 492 AD and developed into a post town over one thousand years later, during the Keichō era. Because Otai-shuku was small there were only five rest areas in the entire post town, daimyōs tended to stay at the neighboring Oiwake-shuku, which was much larger. The Otai-shuku Festival was established to commemorate the 400th anniversary of the founding of the post town; this festival takes place on August 16 of each year.

== Neighboring post towns ==
Nakasendō
Oiwake-shuku - Otai-shuku - Iwamurada-shuku

== Gallery ==
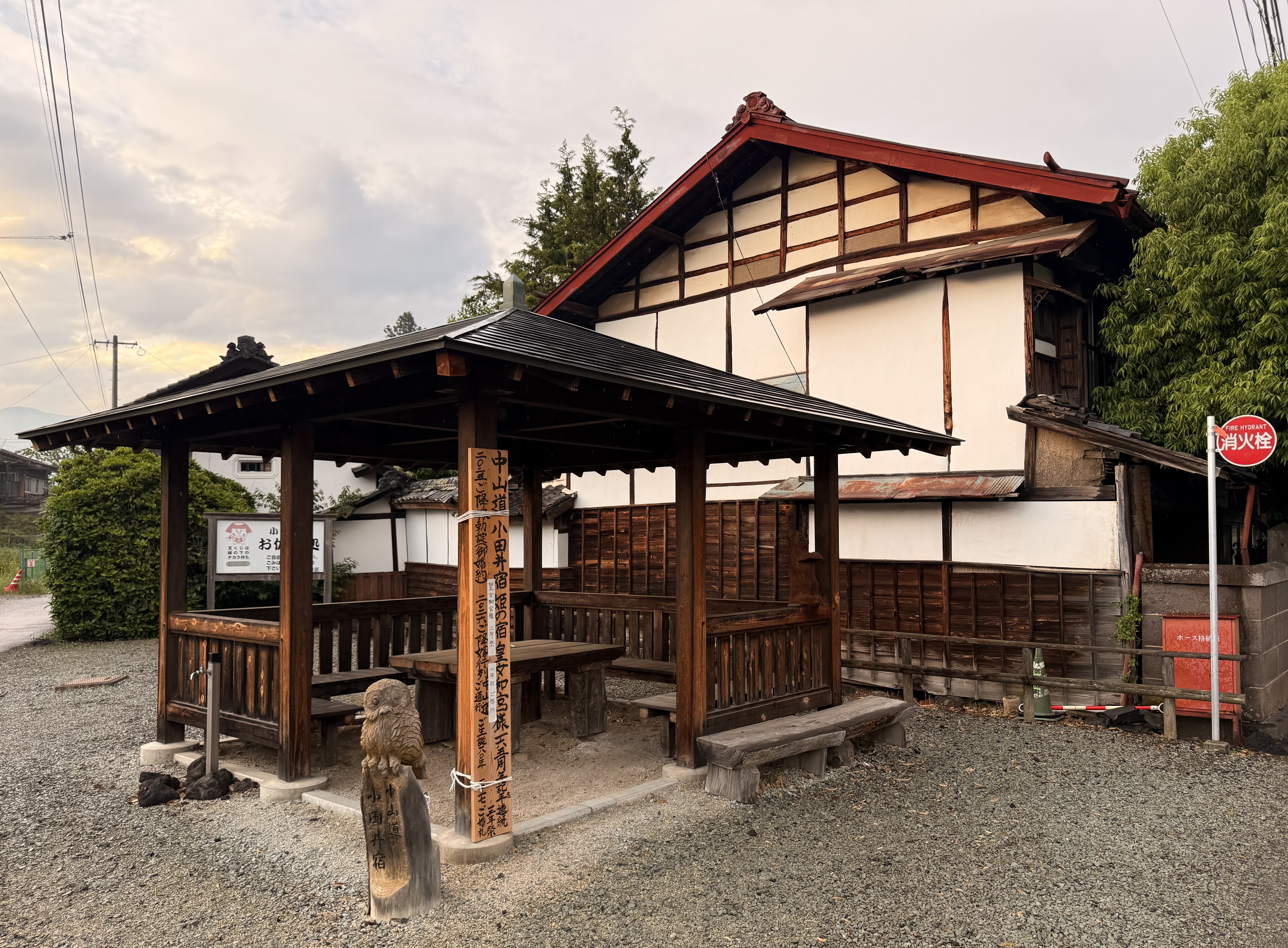
Otai Shuku Rest Area - June 2026

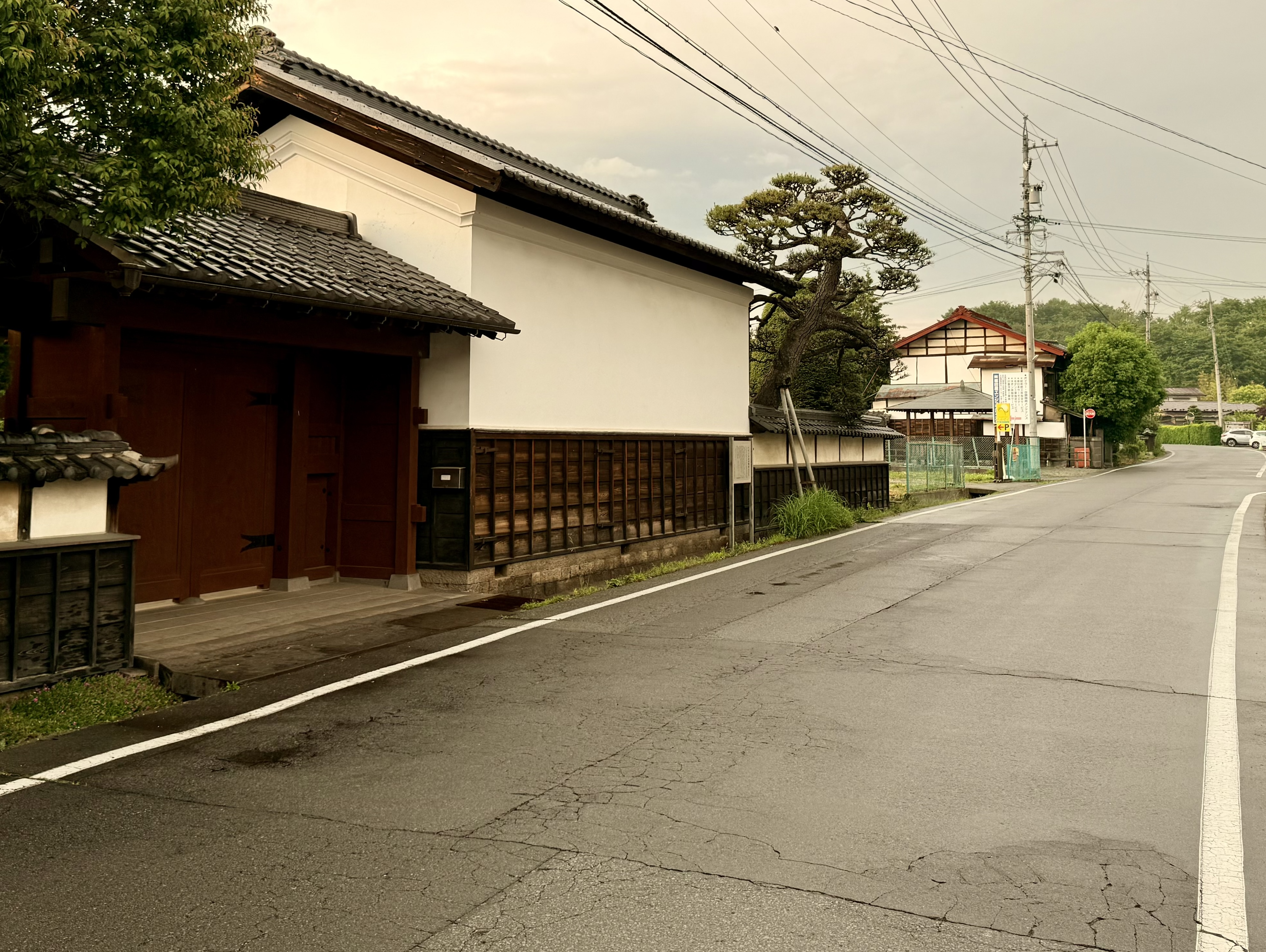
Otai Shuku Street View - June 2026

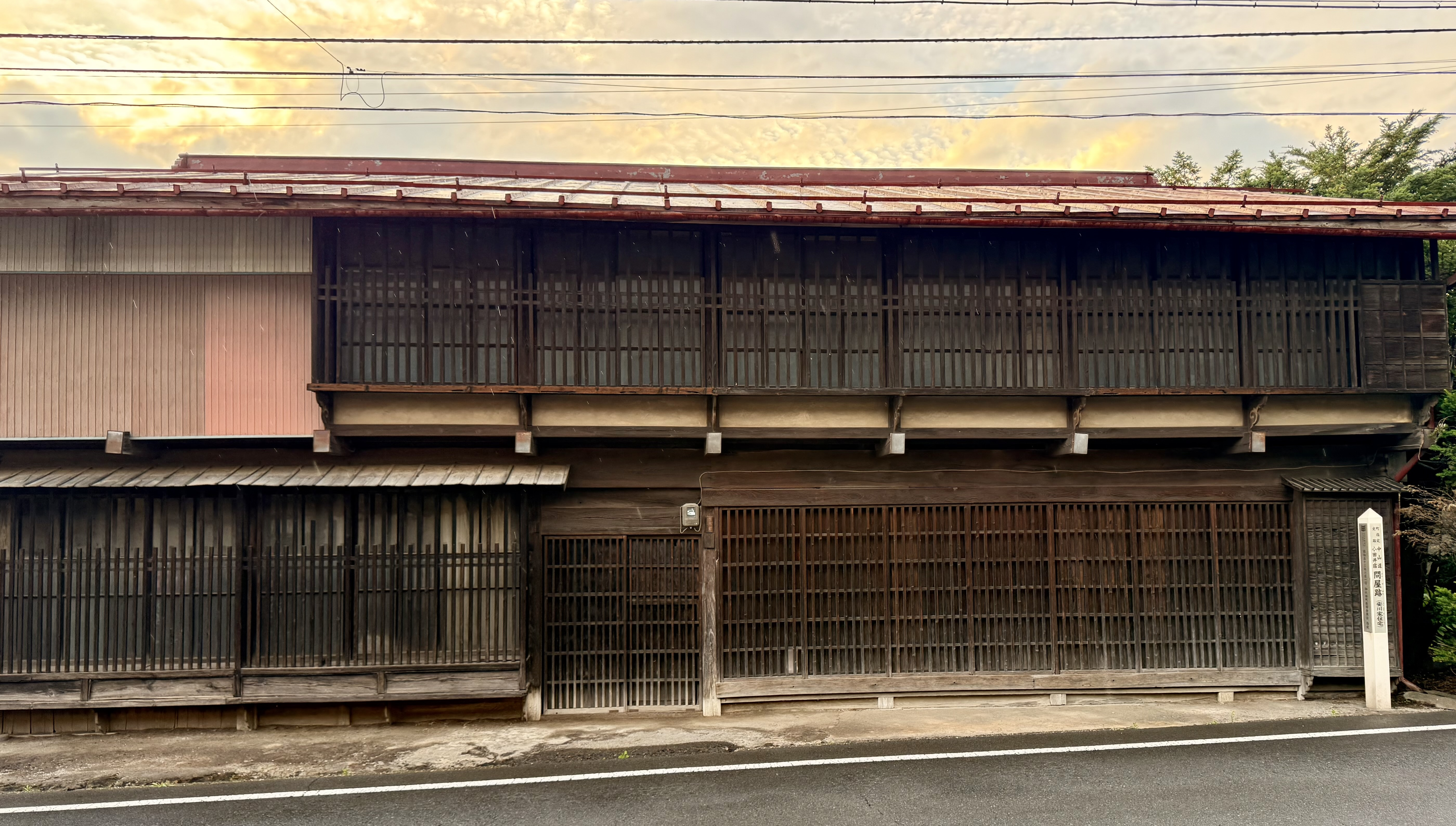
Otai Shuku Yasukawa Residence - June 2026
