= Miyota, Nagano =

Miyota 御代田
- Town
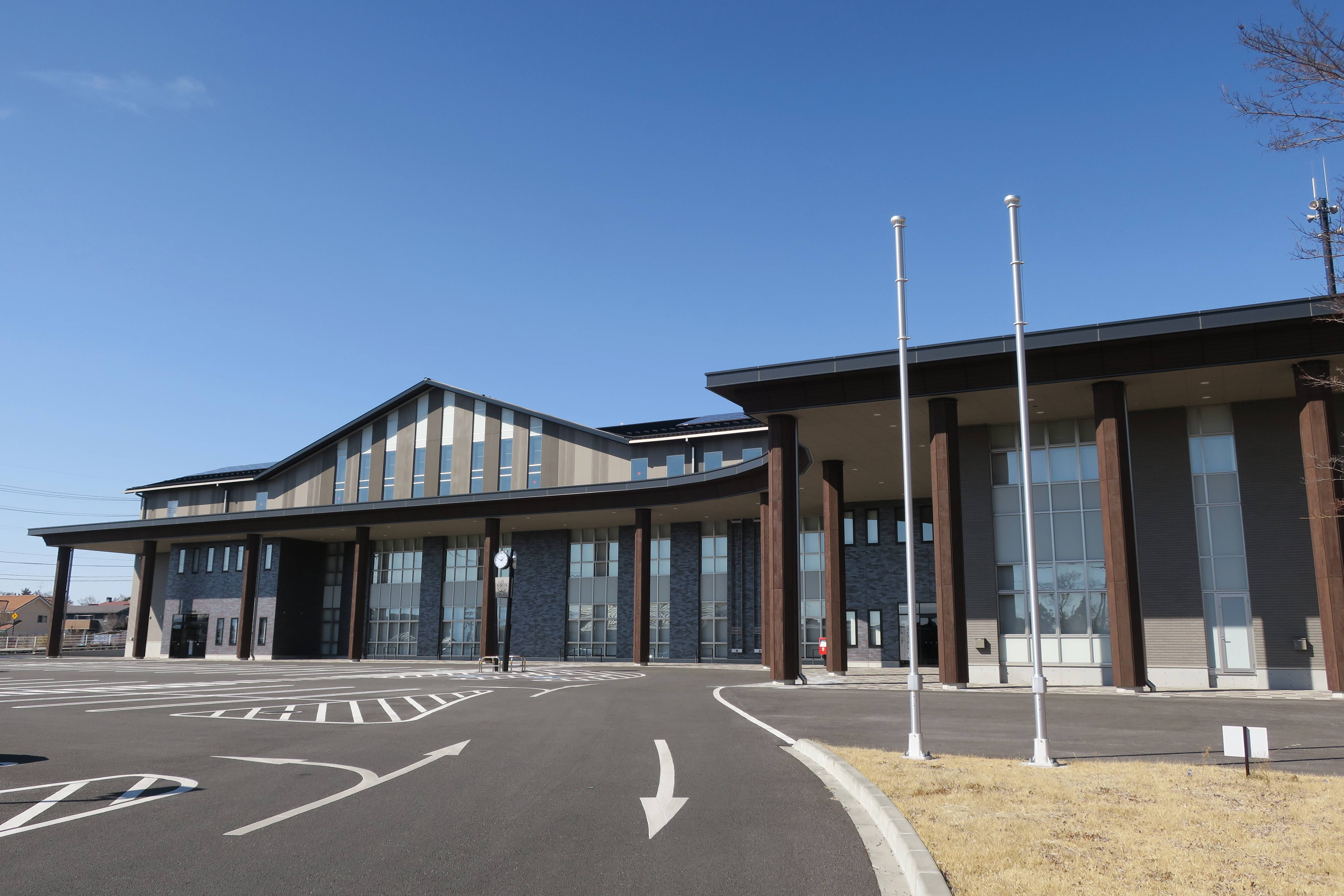
- Miyota Town Hall

- Flag Seal

- Location of Miyota in Nagano Prefecture

- Coordinates: 36°19′16.3″N 138°30′31.6″E
- Country: Japan
- Region: Chūbu (Kōshin'etsu)
- Prefecture: Nagano
- District: Kitasaku

Area
  - Total: 58.76 km^{2} (22.69 sq mi)

Population (April 2019)
  - Total: 15,562
  - Density: 264.8/km^{2} (685.9/sq mi)
- Time zone: UTC+9 (Japan Standard Time)
- Symbols
  - Tree: Taxus cuspidata
  - Flower: Lilium auratum
- Phone number: 0267-32-3111
- Address: 2464-1 Miyota, Miyota-machi, Kitasaku-gun, Nagano-ken 389-0292
- Website: Official website

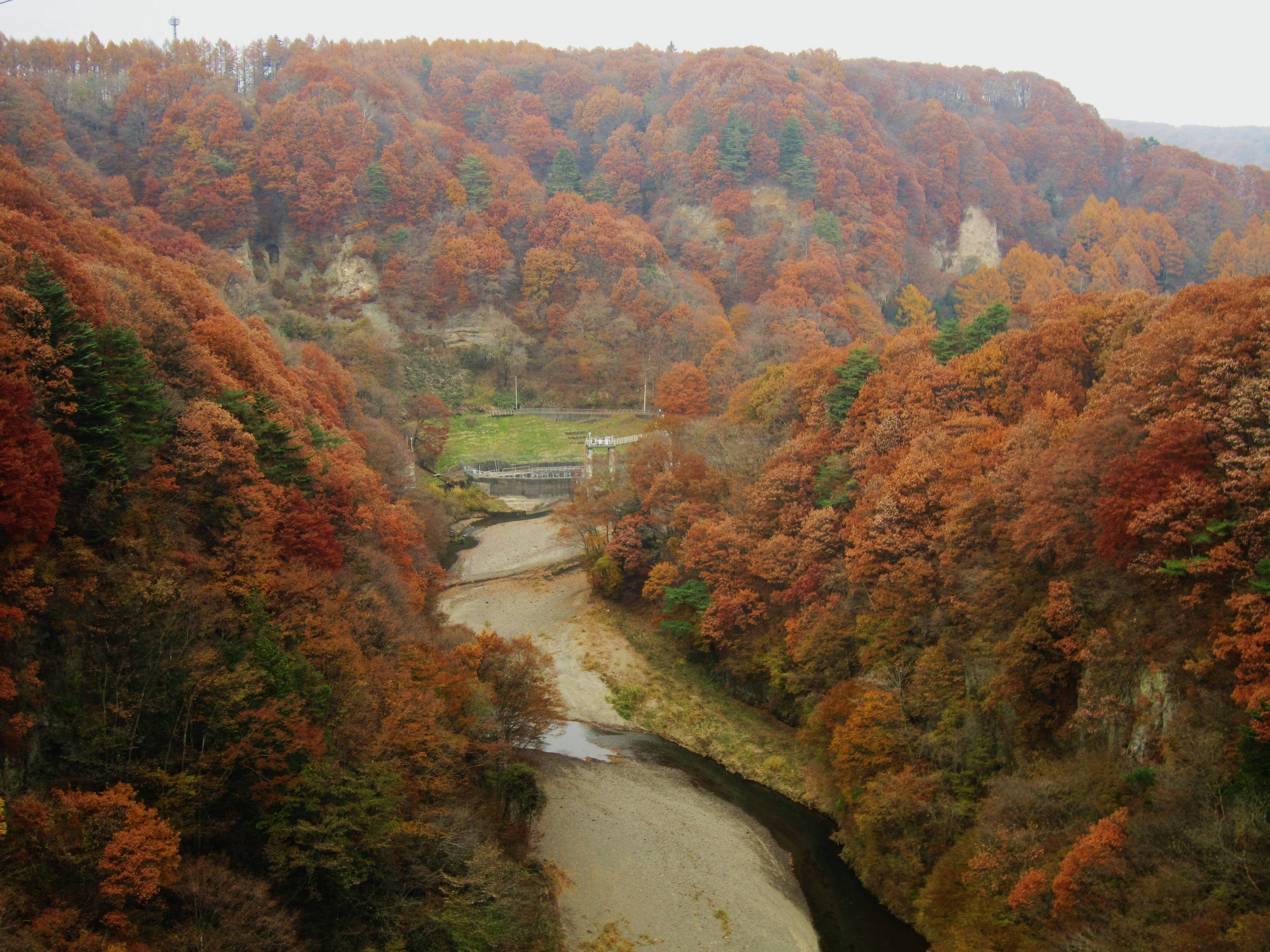
Yu River in Miyota

Miyota (御代田町, Miyota-machi) is a town located in Nagano Prefecture, Japan. As of 1 April 2019, the town had an estimated population of 15,562 in 6897 households, and a population density of 260 persons per km^{2}. The total area of the town is 58.79 square kilometres (22.70 sq mi).

== Geography ==
Miyota is located on the eastern border of Nagano Prefecture with Gumma Prefecture. Mount Asama (2568 meters) is within the town's northern borders.

The Citizen Watch group has other engineering facilities in the adjacent town of Saku, Nagano.

=== Surrounding municipalities ===
- Gunma Prefecture
  - Tsumagoi
- Nagano Prefecture
  - Karuizawa
  - Komoro
  - Saku

=== Climate ===
The town has a humid continental climate characterized by warm and humid summers, and cold winters with heavy snowfall (Köppen climate classification Dfb). The average annual temperature in Miyota is 8.2 °C. The average annual rainfall is 1291 mm with September as the wettest month. The temperatures are highest on average in August, at around 21.1 °C, and lowest in January, at around -4.0 °C.

== Demographics ==
Per Japanese census data, the population of Miyota has nearly doubled over the past 60 years.

Historical population
Year	Pop.	±%
1940	7,942	—
1950	11,094	+39.7%
1960	8,145	−26.6%
1970	8,708	+6.9%
1980	9,851	+13.1%
1990	11,895	+20.7%
2000	13,412	+12.8%
2010	14,741	+9.9%
2020	15,555	+5.5%

== History ==
The area of present-day Miyota was part of ancient Shinano Province, and was the site of the Battle of Odaihara during the Sengoku period. As Otai-shuku, it developed as a post station on the Nakasendo highway connecting Edo with Kyoto during the Edo period. The village of Miyota was created with the establishment of the modern municipalities system on April 1, 1889. It merged with the villages of Onuma and Goka to form the town of Miyota on September 30, 1956.

== Politics and government ==
Miyota is governed by a town council with 14 members.

=== Elections ===
- 2007 Miyota mayoral election

== Education ==
Miyota has two public elementary schools and one public middle school operated by the town government. The town does not have a high school.

== Transportation ==
=== Railway ===
- Shinano Railway
- Miyota

=== Highway ===
- National Route 18

== Local attractions ==
- Mount Asama
- Otai-shuku, post station on the Nakasendō
