= Narai-juku =

Narai-juku 奈良井宿
- Town
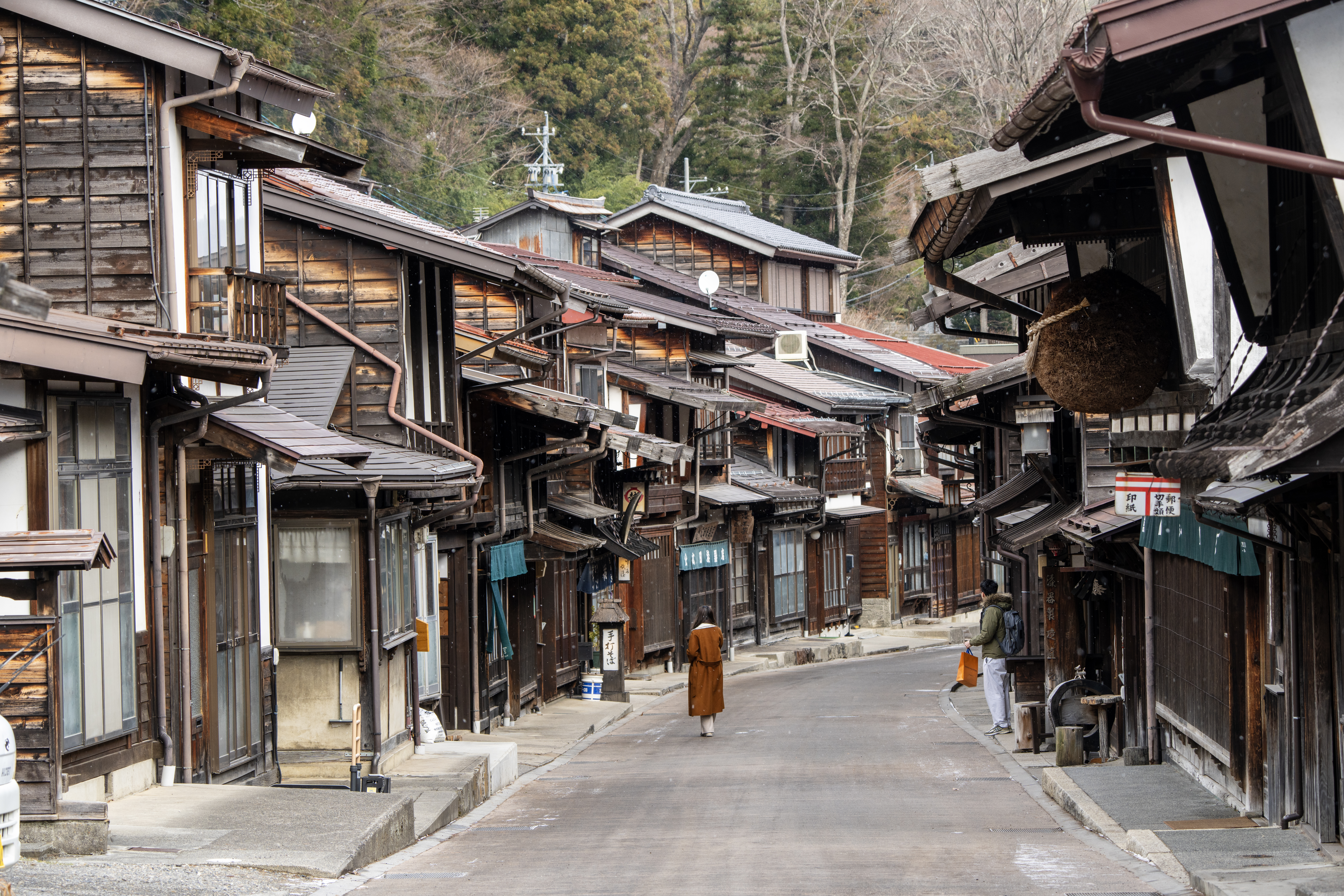
- Interactive map of Narai-juku
- Coordinates: 35°57′55″N 137°48′41″E
- Country: Japan

Narai-juku (奈良井宿, Narai-juku) was the thirty-fourth of the sixty-nine stations of the Nakasendō, as well as the second of eleven stations along the Kisoji. It is located in the present-day city of Shiojiri, Nagano Prefecture, Japan.

== History ==
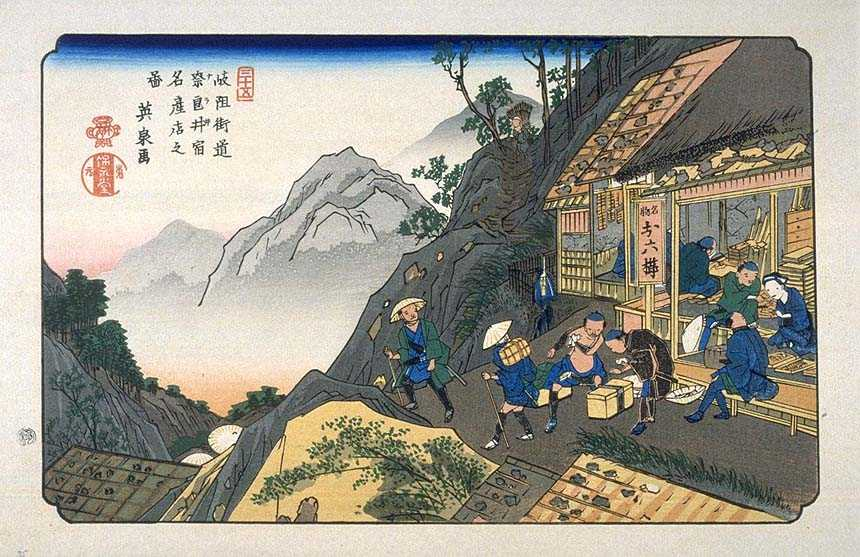
Keisai Eisen's print of Narai-juku, part of the series The Sixty-nine Stations of the Kiso Kaidō

Narai-juku had the highest elevation of all the spots along the Kisoji. Because of all the visitors going through the Torii Pass (鳥居峠 Torii Tōge), Narai flourished as a post town and was referred to as the "Narai of 1,000 buildings" (奈良井千軒 Narai senken). It has since become one of Japan's Nationally Designated Architectural Preservation Sites, so the buildings have been kept much like they originally were in the Edo period.

=== Historical recognition ===
Narai-juku is an Important Preservation District for Groups of Historic Buildings, and as it retains a historical row of Edo period houses along the street, it was confirmed as a Cultural Asset in the Groups of Traditional Buildings category of Cultural Properties of Japan in 1978 and is maintained by the Japanese government grant system. The preservation area comprises an area of approximately 1km from north to south and 200m east to west along the boundary of the old Nakasendō route.

== Gallery ==
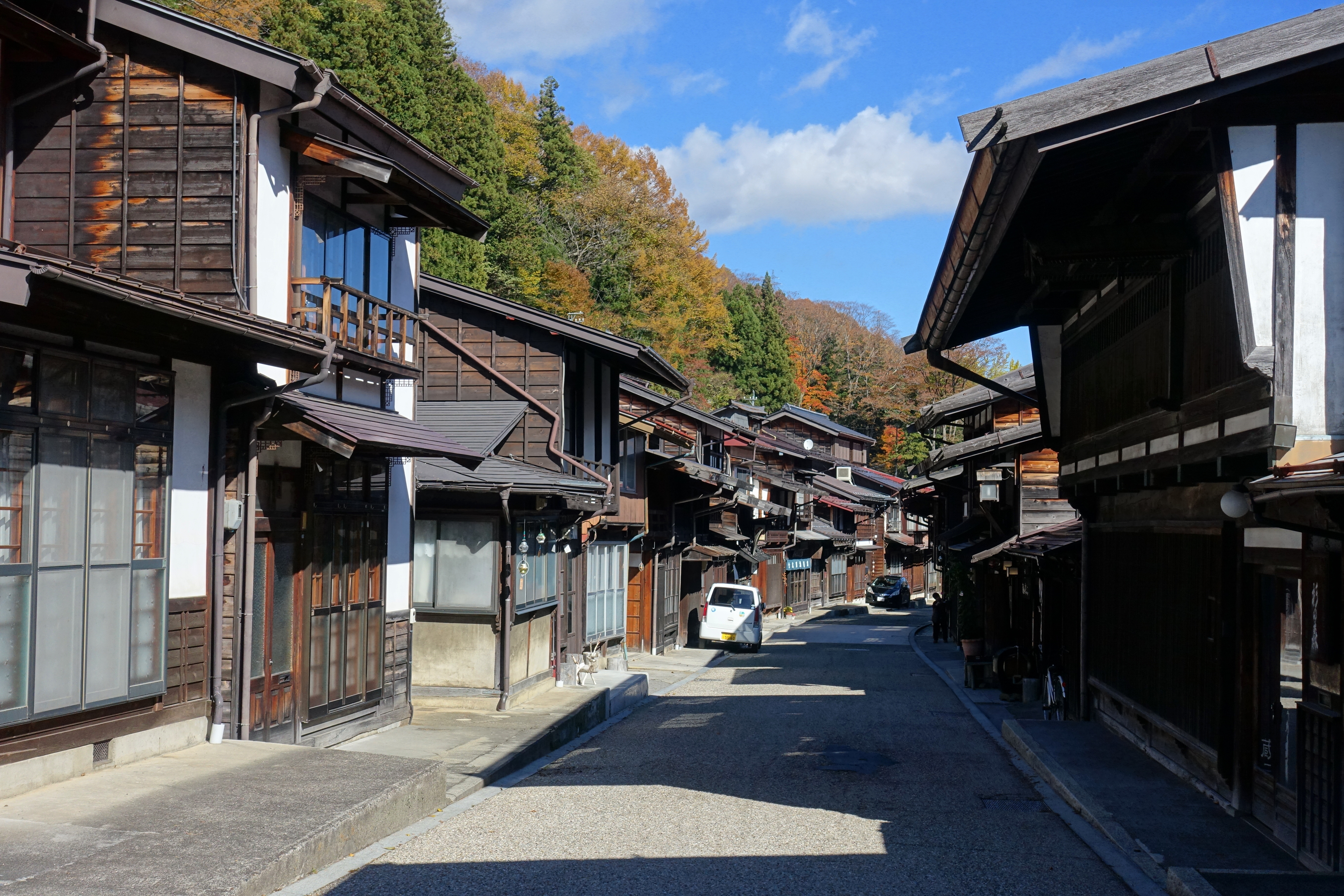
View of Narai-juku facing north-east

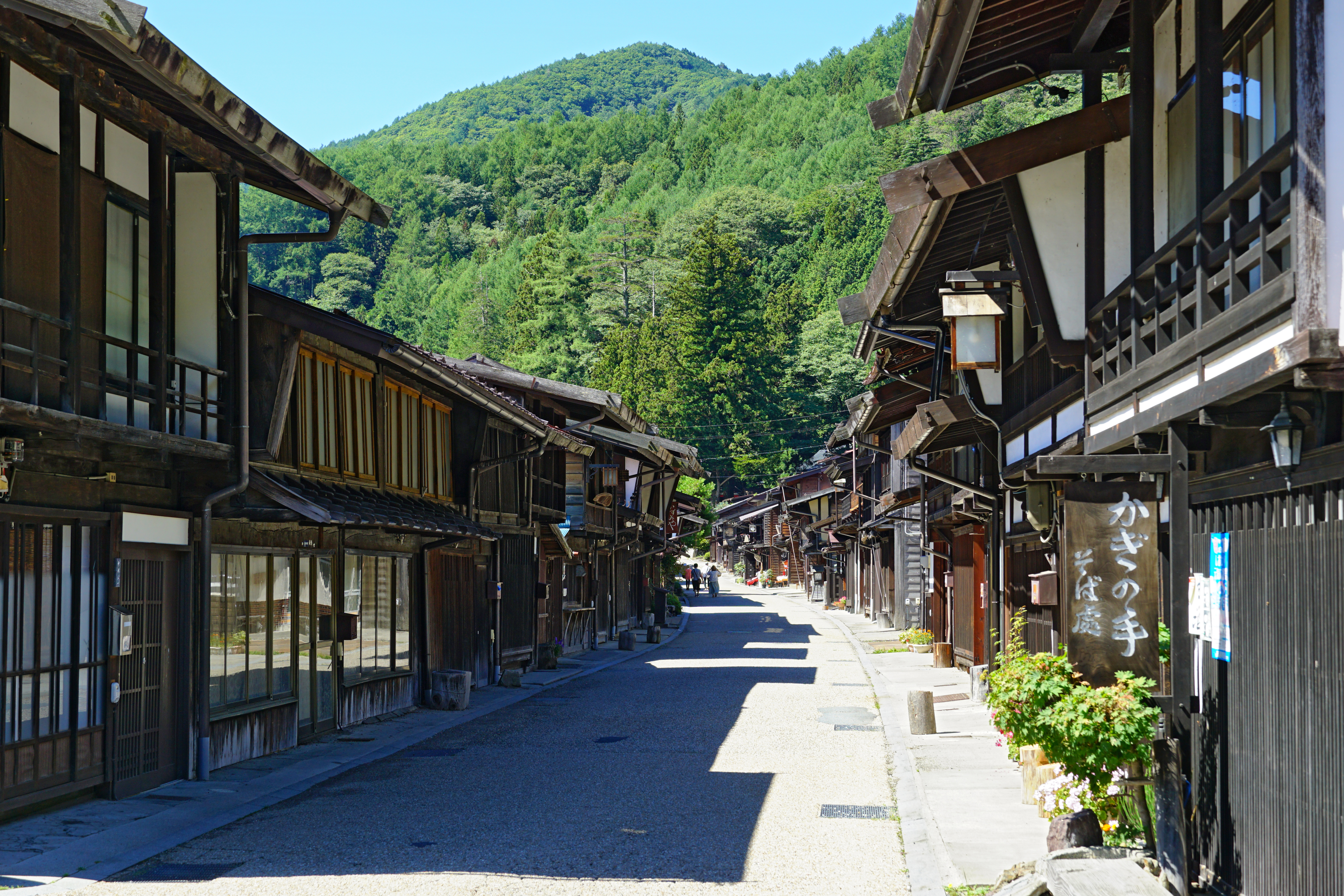
Narai-juku in summer

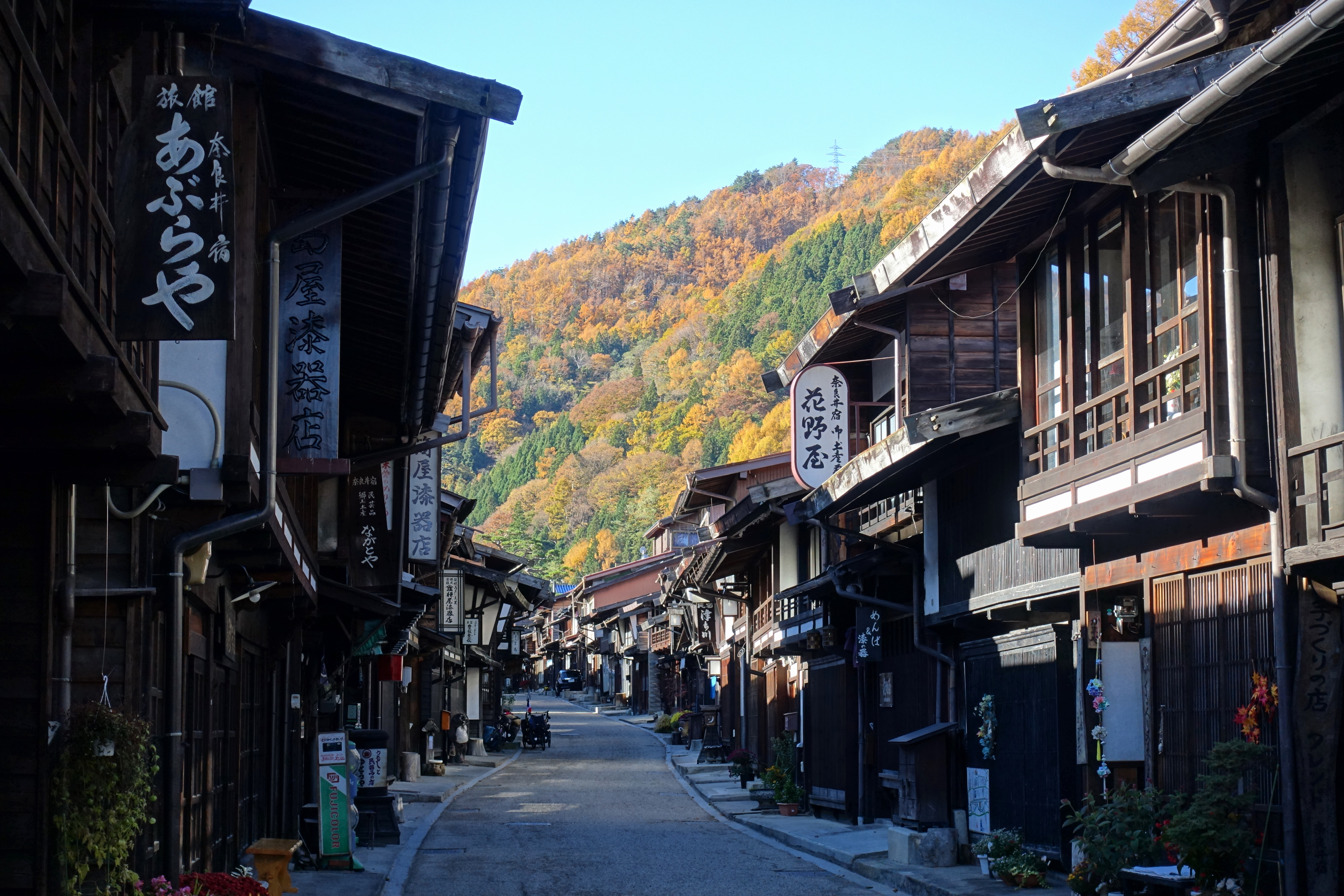
Narai-juku in autumn

== Neighboring post towns ==
Nakasendō & Kisoji
Niekawa-juku - Narai-juku - Yabuhara-juku
