= Yabuhara-juku =

Coordinates: 35°56′17.5″N 137°47′04.7″E

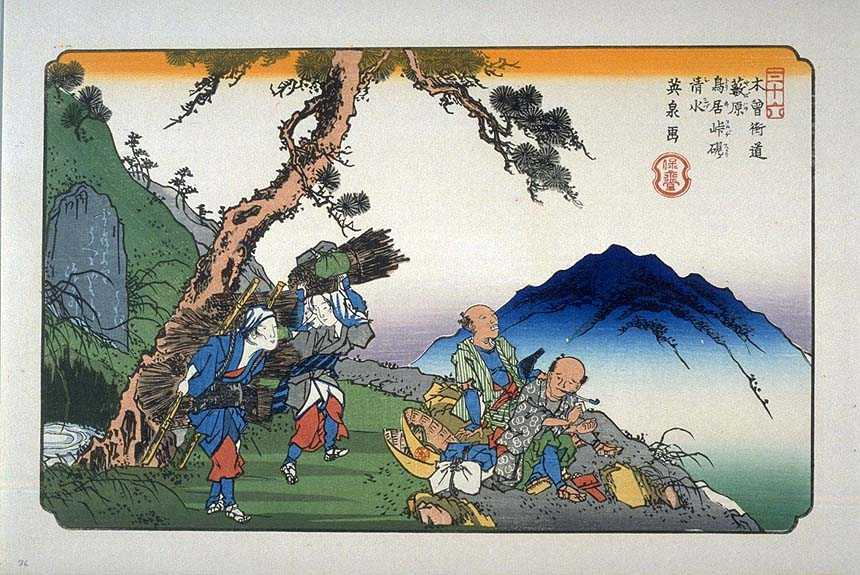
Keisai Eisen's print of Yabuhara-juku, part of the series The Sixty-nine Stations of the Kiso Kaidō

Yabuhara-juku (藪原宿, Yabuhara-juku) was the thirty-fifth of the sixty-nine stations of the Nakasendō, as well as the third of eleven stations on the Kisoji. It is located in the present-day village of Kiso, in the Kiso District of Nagano Prefecture, Japan. Yabuhara-juku is located shortly before the Torii Pass, which was the most difficult part of the Kisoji. Presently, it is known for its omiyage, which are made out of the birch trees that grow nearby.

== Neighboring Post Towns ==
Nakasendō & Kisoji
Narai-juku - Yabuhara-juku - Miyanokoshi-juku
