= Hatago =

Type of lodgings from the Edo period

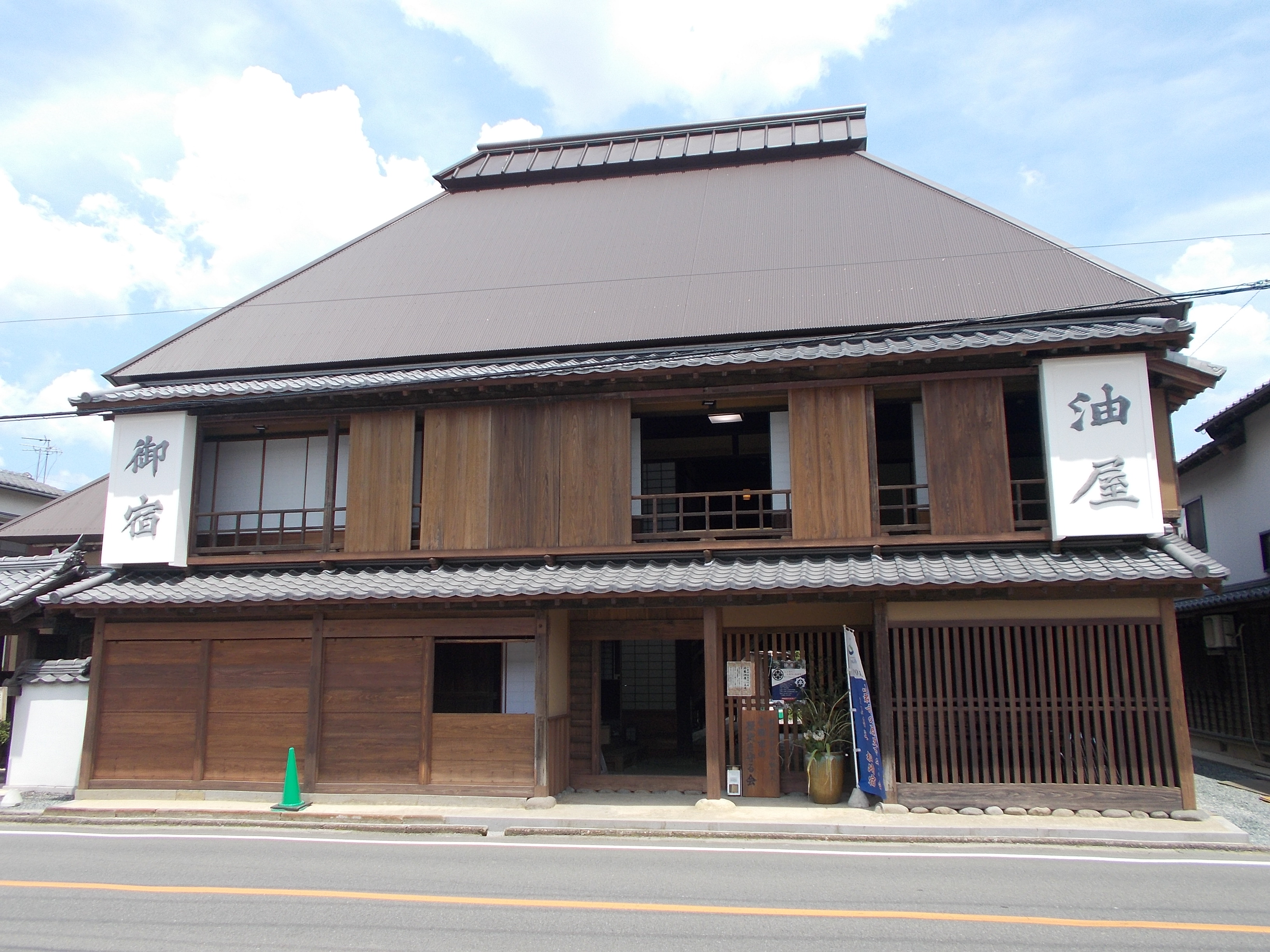
A hatago in Japan which today functions as a museum

Hatago (旅籠) were Edo period lodgings for travelers at shukuba (post stations) along the national highways, including the Edo Five Routes and the subroutes. In addition to a place to rest, hatago also offered meals and other foods to the travelers. They were also called hatagoya (旅籠屋).

== Name origin ==
Hatago means "traveling basket." The word itself originally derived from baskets that contained food for horses and were carried by travelers. From there, it became a tool with which travelers were carry their own food and goods. Shops that began preparing and selling food for travelers gained the suffix ya (屋), meaning "shop," but this was eventually shortened to just hatago.

== Preserved hatago ==
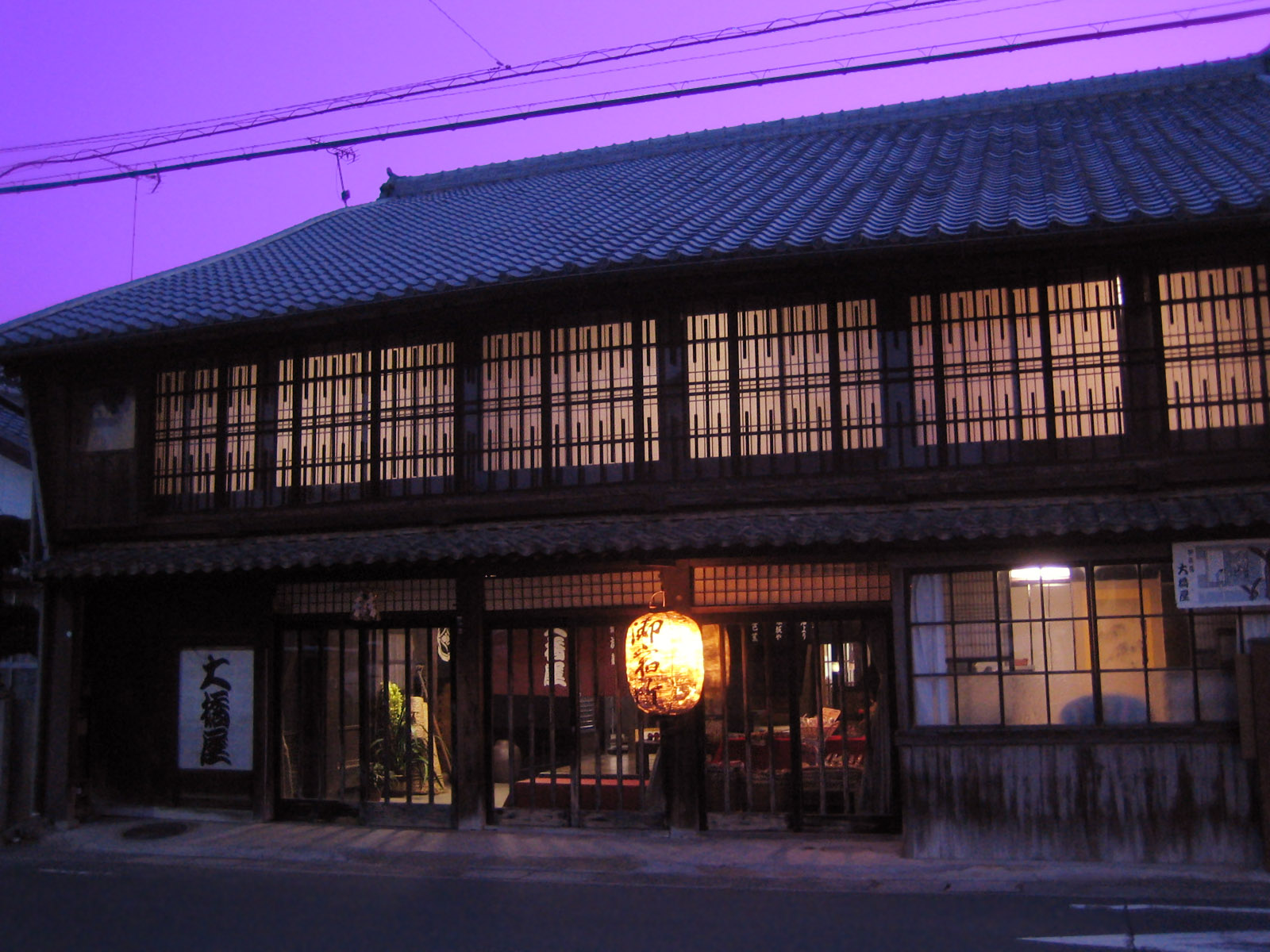
Akasaka-juku's Ōhashi-ya

Because many post stations along the Tōkaidō, Nakasendō and other historical routes have been either preserved or rebuilt, there are many traditional hatago still in existence today. While some have only been preserved as public buildings and museums, others have continued to operate for the past few hundred years.

=== Lodgings ===
- Tōkaidō
  - Akasaka-juku's Ōhashi-ya
- Nakasendō
  - Ashida-shuku's Tsuchi-ya
  - Narai-juku's Echigo-ya
  - Yabuhara-juku's Kome-ya
  - Tsumago-juku's Matsuyo-ya
  - Hosokute-juku's Daikoku-ya
  - Tarui-juku's Kamemaru-ya

=== Museums ===
- Tōkaidō
  - Okabe-juku's Kashiba-ya
  - Nissaka-shuku's Kawasaka-ya and Yorozu-ya
  - Arai-juku's Kinokuni-ya
  - Futagawa-juku's Seimei-ya
  - Seki-juku's Tama-ya

== See also ==
- Toiyaba
- Honjin
- Chaya
