= The Sixty-nine Stations of the Kiso Kaidō =

Artworks by Utagawa Hiroshige and Keisai Eisen

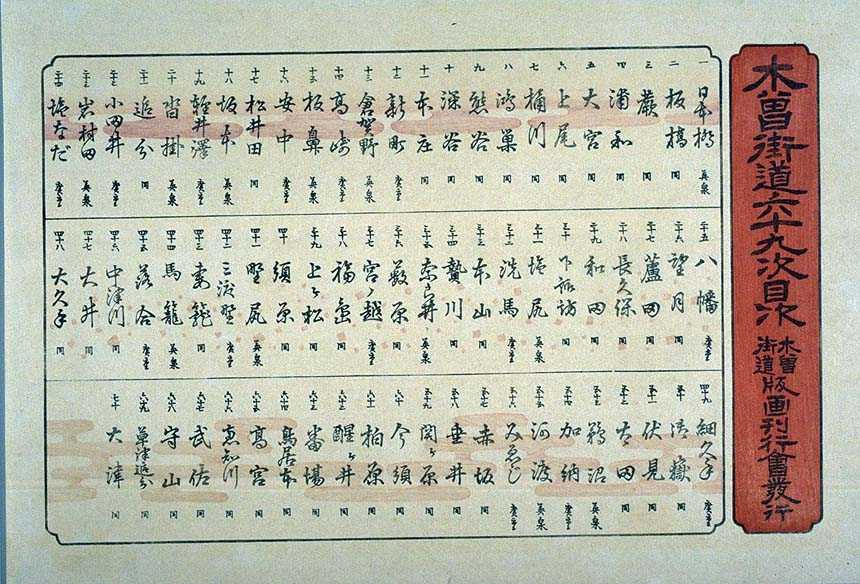
The title page for the series of ukiyo-e prints

The Sixty-nine Stations of the Kisokaidō (木曾街道六十九次, Kisokaidō Rokujūkyū-tsugi) or Sixty-nine Stations of the Kiso Road, is a series of ukiyo-e works created by Utagawa Hiroshige and Keisai Eisen. There are 71 total prints in the series (one for each of the 69 post stations and Nihonbashi; Nakatsugawa-juku has two prints).

The common name for the Kisokaidō is "Nakasendō" so the series is sometimes referred to as the Sixty-nine Stations of the Nakasendō. It is a follow-up to Hiroshige's The Fifty-three Stations of the Tōkaidō and he produced 47 of the prints, with Eisen being responsible for the rest.

The series was published by Iseya Rihei (Kinjudō) from c. 1834-1842.

== The Nakasendō ==
The Nakasendō was one of the Five Routes constructed under Tokugawa Ieyasu, a series of roads linking the historical capital of Edo with the rest of Japan. The Nakasendō connected Edo with the then-capital of Kyoto. It was an alternate route to the Tōkaidō and travelled through the central part of Honshū, thus giving rise to its name, which means "Central Mountain Road". Along this road, there were sixty-nine different post stations, which provided stables, food, and lodging for travelers.

== Prints by Eisen ==
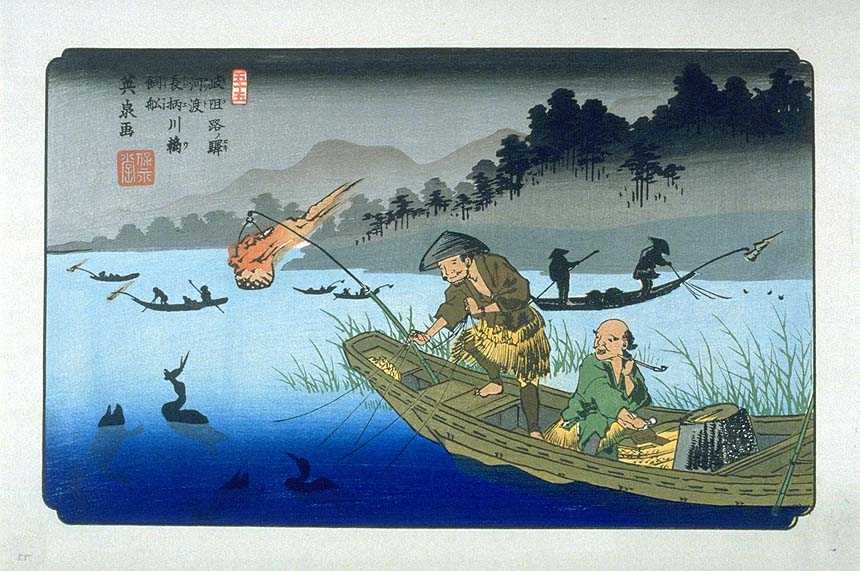
Ukiyo-e print of Gōdo-juku, by Eisen

Eisen produced the first 11 prints of the series, from Nihonbashi to Honjō-shuku, stretching from Tokyo to Saitama Prefecture. His prints from Gunma Prefecture include Kuragano-shuku, Itahana-shuku and Sakamoto-shuku. Representing Nagano Prefecture, he made prints of Kutsukake-shuku, Oiwake-shuku, Iwamurada-shuku, Shiojiri-shuku, Narai-juku, Yabuhara-juku, Nojiri-juku and Magome-juku. His last two prints, Unuma-juku and Gōdo-juku represent Gifu Prefecture. After that, Hiroshige took over production of the series.

== Prints by Hiroshige ==
Kanō-juku
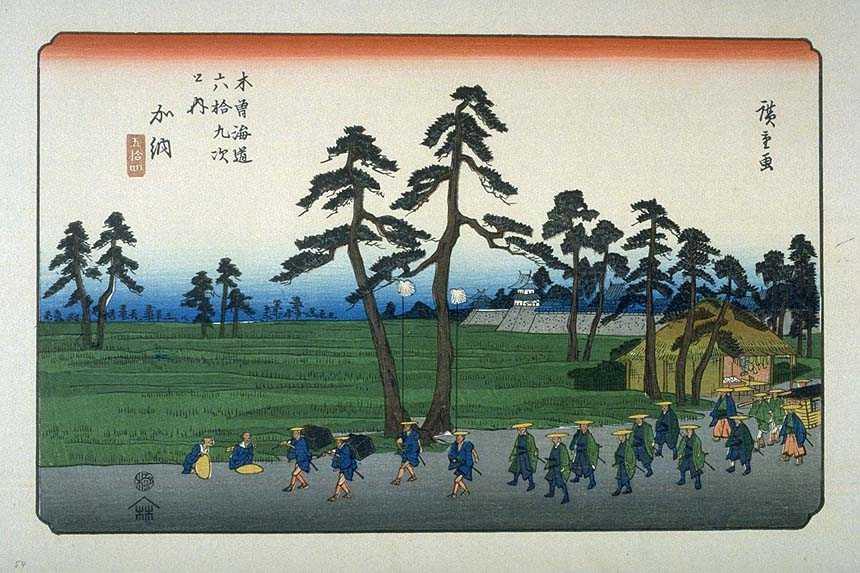
- Artist: Hiroshige

Hiroshige's prints start in Gunma Prefecture and include Shinmachi-shuku, Takasaki-shuku, Annaka-shuku and Matsuida-shuku. His prints that reflect Nagano Prefecture] are Karuisawa-shuku, Otai-shuku, from Shionada-juku to Shimosuwa-shuku, from Seba-juku to Niekawa-juku, from Miyanokoshi-juku to Suhara-juku, Midono-juku and Tsumago-juku. His prints from Gifu Prefecture include Ochiai-juku to Ōta-juku, Kanō-juku, and from Mieji-juku to Imasu-juku. His last ten prints, from Kashiwabara-juku to Ōtsu-juku are all in Shiga Prefecture.

== Tabulation of series ==
The series consists of the sixty-nine stations of the Kisokaidō, plus a board for the starting point, the Nihonbashi bridge ("bridge of Japan") in Edo, and an additional print for the Nakatsugawa-juku station; a total of 71 prints, to which must be added the title page.

The series was published by publisher Takenouchi-Hōeidō, for the first part, and by publisher Kinjūdō for the second. Subsequent reissues were made by Kinjūdō.

№	Woodcut print	English name	Author	Japanese name	Transliteration
1		Nihonbashi	Eisen	日本橋	Nihonbashi
2		Itabashi	Eisen	板橋宿	Itabashi
3		Warabi	Eisen	蕨宿	Warabi
4		Urawa	Eisen	浦和宿	Urawa
5		Omiya	Eisen	大宮宿	Omiya
6		Ageo	Eisen	上尾宿	Ageo
7		Okegawa	Eisen	桶川宿	Okegawa
8		Konosu	Eisen	鴻巣宿	Konosu
9		Kumagaya	Eisen	熊谷宿	Kumagai
10		Fukaya	Eisen	深谷宿	Fukaya
11		Honjo	Eisen	本庄宿	Honjo
12		Shinmachi	Hiroshige	新町宿	Shinmachi
13		Kuragano	Eisen	倉賀野宿	Kuragano
14		Takasaki	Hiroshige	高崎宿	Takasaki
15		Itabana	Eisen	板鼻宿	Itahana
16		Annaka	Hiroshige	安中宿	Annaka
17		Matsuida	Hiroshige	松井田宿	Matsuida
18		Sakamoto	Eisen	坂本宿	Sakamoto
19		Karuizawa	Hiroshige	軽井沢宿	Karuisawa
20		Kutsukake	Eisen	沓掛宿	Kutsukake
21		Oiwake	Eisen	追分宿	Oiwake
22		Odai	Hiroshige	小田井宿	Otai
23		Iwamurata	Eisen	岩村田宿	Iwamurada
24		Shionata	Hiroshige	塩名田宿	Shionada
25		Yawata	Hiroshige	八幡宿	Yawata
26		Mochizuki	Hiroshige	望月宿	Mochizuki
27		Ashida	Hiroshige	芦田宿	Ashida
28		Nagakubo	Hiroshige	長久保宿	Nagakubo
29		Wada	Hiroshige	和田宿	Wada
30		Shimosuwa	Hiroshige	下諏訪宿	Shimosuwa
31		Shiojiri	Eisen	塩尻宿	Shiojiri
32		Seba	Hiroshige	洗馬宿	Seba
33		Motoyama	Hiroshige	本山宿	Motoyama
34		Niikawa	Hiroshige	贄川宿	Niekawa
35		Narai	Eisen	奈良井宿	Narai
36		Yabuhara	Eisen	藪原宿	Yabuhara
37		Miyanokoshi	Hiroshige	宮ノ越宿	Miyanokoshi
38		Fukushima	Hiroshige	福島宿	Fukushima
39		Agematsu	Hiroshige	上松宿	Agematsu
40		Suhara	Hiroshige	須原宿	Suhara
41		Nojiri	Eisen	野尻宿	Nojiri
42		Mitono	Hiroshige	三留野宿	Midono
43		Tsumagome	Hiroshige	妻籠宿	Tsumago
44		Magome	Eisen	馬籠宿	Magome
45		Ochiai	Hiroshige	落合宿	Ochiai
46		Nakatsugawa	Hiroshige	中津川宿	Nakatsugawa I
47		Nakatsugawa	Hiroshige	中津川宿	Nakatsugawa II
48		Oi	Hiroshige	大井宿	Ōi
49		Okute	Hiroshige	大湫宿	Ōkute
50		Hosokute	Hiroshige	細久手宿	Hosokute
51		Mitake	Hiroshige	御嶽宿	Mitake
52		Fushimi	Hiroshige	伏見宿	Fushimi
53		Ota	Hiroshige	太田宿	Ōta
54		Unuma	Eisen	鵜沼宿	Unuma
55		Kano	Hiroshige	加納宿	Kanō
56		Kodo	Eisen	河渡宿	Gōdo
57		Miyeji	Hiroshige	美江寺宿	Mieji
58		Akasaka	Hiroshige	赤坂宿	Akasaka
59		Tarui	Hiroshige	垂井宿	Tarui
60		Sekigahara	Hiroshige	関ヶ原宿	Sekigahara
61		Imasu	Hiroshige	今須宿	Imasu
62		Kashiwabara	Hiroshige	柏原宿	Kashiwabara
63		Samegai	Hiroshige	醒井宿	Samegai
64		Banba	Hiroshige	番場宿	Banba
65		Toriimoto	Hiroshige	鳥居本宿	Toriimoto
66		Takamiya	Hiroshige	高宮宿	Takamiya
67		Echigawa	Hiroshige	愛知川宿	Echigawa
68		Musa	Hiroshige	武佐宿	Musa
69		Moriyama	Hiroshige	守山宿	Moriyama
70		Kusatsu	Hiroshige	草津宿	Kusatsu
71		Otsu	Hiroshige	大津宿	Ōtsu
72		Title page			

== See also ==
- The Fifty-three Stations of the Tōkaidō by Hiroshige
