= Ageo-shuku =

Coordinates: 35.972964°N 139.589944°E

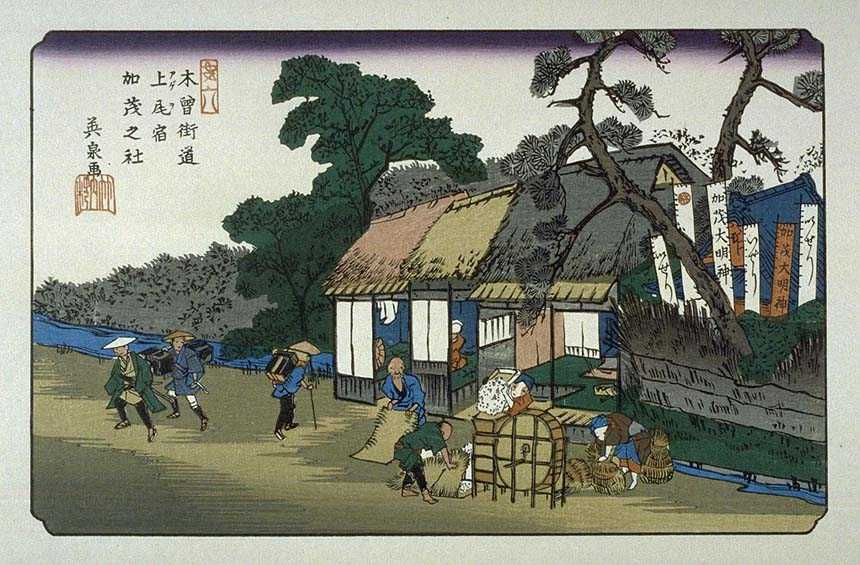
Keisai Eisen's print of Ageo-shuku, part of the Sixty-nine Stations of the Kiso Kaidō series

Ageo-shuku (上尾宿, Ageo-shuku) was the fifth of the sixty-nine stations of the Nakasendō highway connecting Edo with Kyoto during the Edo period. It was located in the present-day city of Ageo, Saitama Prefecture, Japan.

== History ==
The name "Ageo" appears as the name of a locality in Musashi Province in late Sengoku period documents, as a rest area was built by the Later Hōjō clan when they came into control of the area. Ageo-shuku became formalized as a post station on the Nakasendō under the Tokugawa shogunate in 1603. Per an 1843 guidebook issued by the Inspector of Highways (道中奉行, Dōchu-būgyō), the town stretched for about 1.1 kilometers along the highway, with a population of 793 (372 men, 421 women), and boasted one honjin, three waki-honjin, one tonya and 41 hatago.

Ageo-shuku was approximately 10 ri from the starting point of the Nakasendō at Nihonbashi, which was the approximate distance the average traveler could walk in one day. Ageo-shuku was also famous for its large number of meshimori onna and numerous chaya.

Though it was comparatively small in terms of its size as a post town on the Nakasendō, Ageo-shuku had the largest honjin after Shiojiri-shuku. The honjin and waki-honjin were centered on Hikawakuwa Shrine, which still exists. The main honjin was located in front of the shrine, with one of the secondary ones on each side. The third secondary honjin was located just south of the shrine. A Maruhiro Department Store is now located on the former site of the honjin. Most of Aheo-shuku was destroyed by a fire in 1861.

Ageo-juku on the Nakasendo in 2026

== Ageo-shuku in The Sixty-nine Stations of the Kiso Kaidō ==
Keisai Eisen's ukiyo-e print of Ageo-shuku dates from 1835–1838. The inscription to the upper left corner mentions the Kamo Shrine, which was noted for its autumn festival. Votive banners for the shrine are depicted in the rear of the tea house, and are advertising "Takenouchi" and "Hoeidoh", the publishers of the series of prints. In front of the tea house are two men and two women in peasant's clothes, threshing grain. Two samurai travelers are on the road, and one merchant is heading in the opposite direction.

== Neighboring post towns ==
Nakasendō
Ōmiya-shuku - Ageo-shuku - Okegawa-shuku
