= Okegawa-shuku =

Coordinates: 36°00′07″N 139°33′52″E

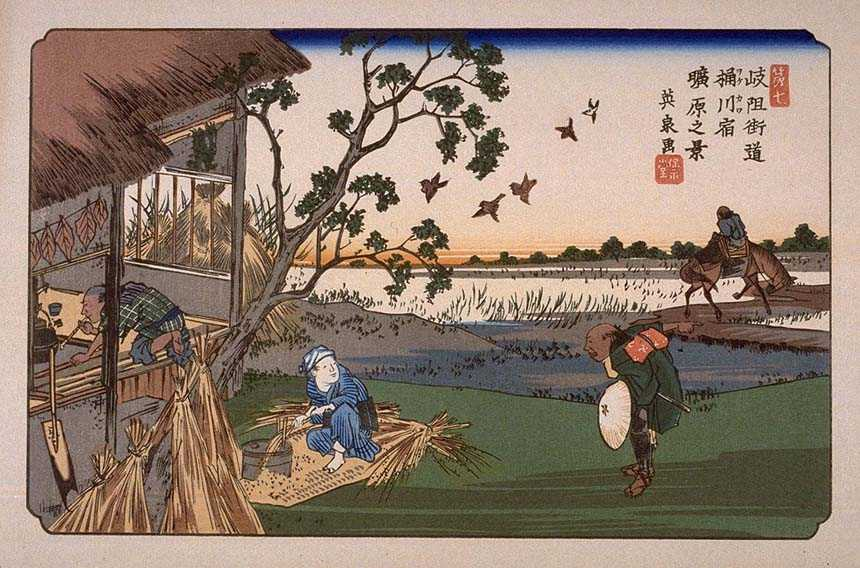
Keisai Eisen's print of Okegaa-shuku, part of the Sixty-nine Stations of the Kiso Kaidō series

Okegawa-shuku (桶川宿, Okegawa-shuku) was the sixth of the sixty-nine stations of the Nakasendō highway connecting Edo with Kyoto during the Edo period. It was located in the present-day city of Okegawa, Saitama Prefecture, Japan.

== History ==
The name "Okegawa" appears as the name of a locality in Musashi Province in late Sengoku period documents. The area was noted for safflower (Japanese: 紅花, romanized: benibana) products and textiles, as well as agricultural products. Okegawa-shuku was 10 ri, 14 chō (approximately 40.8 kilometers) from the starting point of the Nakasendō at Nihonbashi, and was at about the limit a traveler could walk in one day, so was a popular station for the first night out of Edo. Per an 1843 guidebook issued by the Inspector of Highways (道中奉行, Dōchu-būgyō), the town stretched for about 1.0 kilometers along the highway, with a population of 1444 in 347 houses, and boasted one honjin, two waki-honjin, and 36 hatago. Okegawa-shuku was also famous for its large number of meshimori onna and had upwards of 20 brothels. The station was also famous for its Inari Shrine, and also hot springs which were claimed to be effective against a number of ailments.

Some of the structures have survived to the present day. Additionally, the Takemura Ryokan, which operated during the Edo period, is still open for business, keeping the same atmosphere as in its past. On November 13, 1861, Princess Kazunomiya stayed there on her way to Edo. The city of Okegawa now runs the Nakasendō Shukuba-kan, which provides information on the old post town, as well as walking maps. Including in the walking courses are its honjin and one of its hatago.

== Okegawa-shuku in The Sixty-nine Stations of the Kiso Kaidō ==
Keisai Eisen's ukiyo-e print of Ogekawa-shuku dates from 1835–1838. Eisen chose to depict a rural scene in autumn, with a traveler approaching a house where a peasant woman is threshing grain, while her husband smokes his pipe in the house. Tobacco leaves are drying from the eaves. A man is seated sideways on a pack horse headed in the opposite direction.

== Neighboring post towns ==
Nakasendō
Ageo-shuku - Okegawa-shuku - Kōnosu-shuku

== Gallery ==
Okegawa-juku Nakasendo street view in 2026

Entrance to the Honjin inn at Okegawa-juku on the Nakasendo

Kobayashi House (c1828-1852) at Okegawa-juku on the Nakasendo.
