= List of Kemono Friends episodes =

Kemono Friends is a television anime series produced by Kadokawa, based on the mobile video game created by Nexon. The series revolves around Friends, anthropomorphised versions of various animals, as they go about their lives while occasionally fighting against monsters known as Ceruleans. The original anime series, written and directed by Tatsuki at Yaoyorozu, aired between January 10 and March 28, 2017, and was simulcast by Crunchyroll, who co-financed and licensed the series. The opening theme is "Yōkoso Japari Park e" (ようこそジャパリパークへ, Welcome to Japari Park) by Dōbutsu Biscuits×PPP, while the ending theme is "Boku no Friend" (ぼくのフレンド, My Friend) by Mewhan. Original content for TV Tokyo's AniTele service was released from April 1, 2017. An unofficial "episode 12.1" 2-minute short was uploaded by the director to Niconico and YouTube on April 5, 2017. Additional shorts have been created in collaboration with Japan Racing Association, Animelo Summer Live 2017, and Nissin Foods. The second season, directed by Ryuichi Kimura at Tomason and written by Takuya Matsumoto, aired from January 14 to April 1, 2019. The opening theme is "Notteke~ Japari Beat," by Dōbutsu Biscuits×PPP. The ending theme from episodes 1-5 is "Hoshi o Tsunagete" by Gothic×Luck. From episode 6-onwards, Gothic×Luck performed the series' second ending theme "Kimi wa Kaeru Basho." An original net animation mini-series based on the original mobile game, titled Welcome to the Japari Park (ようこそジャパリパーク, Yōkoso Japari Pāku), began streaming on TV Tokyo's AnimeTele service from August 10, 2018. Crunchyroll began streaming the series from October 16, 2018.

== Episode list ==
=== Kemono Friends (2017) ===
No.	Title (Note: All English titles are taken from Crunchyroll.)	Original release date
1	"Savanna Area"; Transliteration: "Sabanna Chihō" (Japanese: さばんなちほー)	January 10, 2017
In the Savanna area of a place known as Japari Park, a girl carrying a hat and a bag comes across Serval, who is a humanized animal known as a Friend. Noticing the girl has no memory of where she came from or what kind of animal she is, Serval names the girl "Kaban" after her bag and decides to lead her to the Savanna exit so she can find the Japari Library for more information. After receiving some help from a hippopotamus, Serval comes across a dangerous creature known as a Cerulean, struggling to find its weak point. However, Kaban manages to find the weak point on the Cerulean's back and uses a paper airplane to distract it so Serval can defeat it. Continuing into the Jungle Area, Kaban and Serval come across a robotic rabbit named Lucky Beast, who converses with Kaban despite having never talked to the other animals.
2	"Jungle Area"; Transliteration: "Janguru Chihō" (Japanese: じゃんぐるちほー)	January 17, 2017
Lucky Beast guides Kaban and Serval through the Jungle area, where they soon discover a broken down bus. With help from an Asian small-clawed otter and a jaguar, the girls manage to find the bus' driver seat section on the other side of a river, but struggle to find a way to carry it back to the bus. Luckily, Kaban manages to use her ingenuity and helps the others to build a partial bridge across the river, allowing Serval to carry the driver seat across. They then discover, however, that the bus' battery has died and must be recharged at a café at the top of the mountain.
3	"Mountain"; Transliteration: "Kōzan" (Japanese: こうざん)	January 24, 2017
Receiving a lift from a crested ibis, Kaban manages to reach the Japari Café at the top of the mountain, run by an alpaca who is depressed over the lack of customers. While the bus battery is left to charge, Kaban helps Alpaca make her café more noticeable by pulling out grass to make a makeshift sign. With the battery fully charged, Kaban and Serval get the bus running and set off on their way. Meanwhile, two other Friends, Raccoon and Fennec, start following Kaban and Serval's trail.
4	"Desert Area"; Transliteration: "Sabaku Chihō" (Japanese: さばくちほー)	January 31, 2017
While passing through the desert, Kaban and Serval become trapped in an underground attraction alongside a tsuchinoko, having to work together with her to find an exit.
5	"Lake Shore"; Transliteration: "Kohan" (Japanese: こはん)	February 7, 2017
Serval accidentally knocks the bus into some logs, which an American beaver was planning to use to build her house, despite lacking the courage to go through with it. While searching for replacement trees, the girls come across a prairie dog, who is also having trouble building a home as the tunnels she digs keep collapsing in on her. Taking note of both Friends' strengths and weaknesses, Kaban suggests that they work together to build a house they can share.
6	"Plains"; Transliteration: "Heigen" (Japanese: へいげん)	February 14, 2017
Kaban and Serval come across a fort, where a lion explains that she is always easily beating a rival team, led by a moose, and wants them to become good enough to fight her directly. Thus, she sneaks Kaban and Serval into Moose's team, where Kaban gives them a new strategy allowing them to sneak into the fort and reach a draw against Lion. Afterwards, one of Moose's minions, Shoebill, informs Kaban that she might be a human.
7	"Japari Library"; Transliteration: "Japari Toshokan" (Japanese: じゃぱりとしょかん)	February 21, 2017
Wanting to find out more about humans, Kaban and Serval head towards Japari Library, first having to go through a trivia-based maze. Upon reaching the library, the girls meet a northern white-faced owl and a Eurasian eagle owl, who task them with cooking them a meal. After Kaban manages to please them with a curry, the owls reveal that humans have allegedly gone extinct, suggesting they search for a human-suitable area for more information and giving them some concert tickets to PPP, Japari Park's penguin idol group, as a reward.
8	"PPP Live"; Transliteration: "PePaPu Raibu" (Japanese: ぺぱぷらいぶ)	February 28, 2017
Kaban and Serval travel to the Waterfront Area, where the third generation of PPP are holding their first concert, and meet a fangirl Friend named Margay. As the girls get to sit in on PPP's rehearsal, they discover the group is worried about living up to the standards of their predecessors. Just before their performance, one of the members, Princess the royal penguin, starts acting strange after Margay brings up how the previous generations had fewer members. Upon learning that Princess has stage fright due to the group never having a royal penguin before, Kaban and Serval drag her back to the stage, where she hears the other penguins praise her for everything she's done for them. With an extra push from Margay, Princess rejoins the group and brings out a successful performance. After assigning Margay as their manager, the penguins direct Kaban towards the harbour, where humans were last seen.
9	"Snowy Mountains Area"; Transliteration: "Yukiyama Chihō" (Japanese: ゆきやまちほー)	March 7, 2017
Kaban and Serval pass through the Snowy Mountains Area, deciding to make their way towards a hot spring. While taking shelter in a snow hut Kaban made during a snowstorm, the girls are approached by two foxes, Silver Fox and Ezo Red Fox, who lead them to some natural hot springs on their way to fix some broken equipment. While exploring the hot springs, Kaban and Serval hear a recorded message from Lucky Beast, referring to someone named Mirai. Just then, a stampede of Ceruleans appear, prompting Kaban to create a makeshift sled, allowing everyone to escape safely back to the bus. After stopping by a hot spring inn afterwards, Kaban and Serval head towards a lodge where they can spend the night.
10	"Lodge"; Transliteration: "Rojji" (Japanese: ろっじ)	March 14, 2017
The girls arrive at Lodge Campo, run by a campo flicker. While exploring the lodge, they meet a gray wolf and a reticulated giraffe, while also hearing another message from Mirai. The next day, Campo Flicker mentions seeing a mysterious shadow lurking around, which the other guests suspect might be a Cerulean. As Kaban and Serval end up having to extend their stay due to the rain, they eventually stumble across the mysterious Friend-shaped figure that the other guests reported seeing. Kaban eventually deduces that the figure was actually a projection of Mirai that appears during her reports. As the projection clears up to show Mirai reporting on a dangerous Cerulean, Serval tears up when she sees another Serval alongside Mirai. Upon finally arriving at the harbor, Kaban and Serval prepare to board a boat out to sea, when they suddenly hear a loud noise.
11	"Cerulean"; Transliteration: "Serurian" (Japanese: せるりあん)	March 21, 2017
Kaban and Serval are rescued from a black Cerulean by a golden snub-nosed monkey, who works alongside Brown Bear and African Wild Dog as Cerulean hunters. After Lucky Beast exclaims a warning about something called Sandstar Raw, Kaban and Serval follow him up a mountain while the hunters stay behind to hunt the black Cerulean's main body. After receiving another message from Mirai mentioning "four gods", the girls reach the top of the mountain where Sandstar forms. It is there that Raccoon and Fennec catch up to them, with Raccoon claiming that Kaban had stolen her hat, although she returns it after hearing about all of her good deeds. As the girls follow Mirai's instructions to dig up four tablets representing the four gods, the black Cerulean below starts absorbing Sandstar Raw from the mountain to grow larger. With the four tablets in place, the girls manage to put up a filter to stop the Cerulean absorbing more Sandstar Raw. Determined to protect the park, Kaban comes up with a plan to use the boat to lure the Cerulean into the ocean. When the plan goes awry and Serval gets swallowed up by the Cerulean, however, Kaban dives in to pull Serval out before luring the Cerulean away, sacrificing herself in the process.
12	"Amusement Park"; Transliteration: "Yūenchi" (Japanese: ゆうえんち)	March 28, 2017
Shocked to learn that Kaban had been eaten by the Cerulean while saving her, Serval goes with Brown Bear to attempt to save her. Meanwhile, Lucky Beast, breaking his rule of not speaking directly to Friends due to a human being in danger, sends a transmission to all of the other Friends, who join Serval in confronting the Cerulean and rescuing Kaban. Despite being eaten by the Cerulean, which would normally turn a Friend back into its original animal form, Kaban, having been a human Friend to begin with, just ends up returning to normal. However, Lucky Beast sacrifices himself to bring the Cerulean out on the boat, sinking into the ocean along with it, although Kaban manages to find his A.I. still intact. One month later, as a big party is held at an amusement park, Raccoon explains how Kaban became a Friend after Sandstar landed on her hat, which originally belonged to Mirai and contained a strand of human hair from her head. After receiving one more message from Mirai, Kaban sets sail in search of other humans, with Serval and the other Friends deciding to follow after her.

==== Specials ====
No.	Title	Original release date
12.1	"Bus-like"; Transliteration: "Basuteki" (Japanese: ばすてき)	April 5, 2017
With the Japari Bus broken down, the Owls help Raccoon and Fennec find a replacement.
Special	"Racecourse"; Transliteration: "Keibajō" (Japanese: けいばじょう)	August 9, 2017
Kaban and Serval come across a racecourse, where they meet three Thoroughbred horse Friends.
Special–2	"Ani Summer"; Transliteration: "AniSama" (Japanese: あにさま)	August 29, 2017
While preparing a concert hall for a certain event, the owls come across a bunch of cards depicting proper concert behavior.
Special–3	"Plump"; Transliteration: "Fukkura" (Japanese: ふっくら)	September 19, 2017
Silver Fox and Ezo Red Fox watch a commercial to try and determine how to prepare instant kitsune udon.

=== Kemono Friends 2 (2019) ===
No.	Title	Original release date
1	"Beyond Memories"; Transliteration: "Kioku no Kanata" (Japanese: きおくのかなた)	January 14, 2019
Emerging from a mysterious laboratory in Japari Park, a human child encounters two Friends, Serval and Caracal, who name her Kyururu. After finding a sketchbook where Kyururu emerged from, the group travel to the locations drawn in the sketchbook in order to find Kyururu's home. Along the way, they come across an Indian spot-billed duck, who leads them to the second location in Kyururu's book, a monorail station. When a Cerulean appears, Indian Spot-Billed Duck distracts it while the others head onto the monorail before another mysterious Friend defeats the Cerulean.
2	"Panda and Panda"; Transliteration: "Panda to Panda" (Japanese: ぱんだとぱんだ)	January 21, 2019
Stopping off at Azea Park to search for the next location in Kyururu's sketchbook, the group meet a giant panda, who falls asleep while giving them directions, and a red panda, who attempts to guide them without knowing where it actually is. Despite this, the group do eventually find the location of a playground, which Kyururu and the others help put back together. When Ceruleans show up to destroy the playground, Giant Panda gets upset and beats them all single-handedly. After learning that some other Friends were searching for a human, Kyururu and the others set off towards their next destination, the Marine Life Park.
3	"Creatures of the Sea"; Transliteration: "Umi no Kemono" (Japanese: うみのけもの)	January 28, 2019
The group arrive at the Marine Life Park and meet a bottlenose dolphin and a California sea lion, who take them on a boat to a stadium submerged underwater. After showing Kyururu the stadium, Dolphin and Sea Lion refuse to take everyone back to land unless they give them a reward. Recalling something about the stadium, Kyururu uses objects on the boat to teach Dolphin and Sea Lion new tricks to perform, with the applause they receive convincing them to take everyone back. Meanwhile, Alma the giant armadillo and Sen the giant pangolin who are following Kyururu's trail report to a mysterious figure.
4	"Different Kinds of Houses"; Transliteration: "Iron'na Ouchi" (Japanese: いろんなおうち)	February 4, 2019
With a gap in the track preventing the monorail from going any further, Kyururu and the others are guided by another Lucky Beast through South America Park to the next location in Kyururu's book. There, they come across an aardwolf, who has come to meet with Campo Flicker to find a new place to live. As the group is forced to take shelter from the rain under a cave, Kyururu turns her drawing into a jigsaw puzzle to pass the time. After the rain stops, Campo Flicker shows everyone what Kyururu's drawing depicted; termite mounds lit up by fire beetles, with Aardwolf deciding to live in the cave. Just then, Alma and Sen attempt to take Kyururu back to their client, but are easily scared off by Caracal. The group then head to the Jungle Area in the hopes of finding another human.
5	"The Power of Humans"; Transliteration: "Hito no Chikara" (Japanese: ひとのちから)	February 11, 2019
The group find themselves come across some feuding crocodilians and leopards, who have a hard time believing that Kyururu is a human. Their leader, a western lowland gorilla, offers to let Kyururu meet a human she knows on the condition that she pretend to be scary in order to stop her underlings fighting with each other. However, this only leads the two factions to fight over Kyururu, as they believe humans have the ability to make animals their servants. To remedy the situation, Kyururu makes a paper wrestling game for everyone to settle their disputes with. Just then, Kyururu is attacked by an aggressive Siberian tiger but is saved by the arrival of another human: Kaban.
6	"A New Morning"; Transliteration: "Atarashii Asa" (Japanese: あたらしいあさ)	February 18, 2019
After taking Kyururu and the others back to her lab, Kaban, who has been researching with the owls, explains that the tiger they encountered was a Beast, an animal who didn't become a Friend upon encountering Sandstar. That night, after having a strange dream about being attacked by a sea creature, Kyururu deduces that the powerful Ceruleans that have been appearing recently are coming from a submarine volcano. As the owls take Kyururu with them to take a Sandstar sample from the ocean, a sample of Ceruleum breaks loose and becomes a Cerulean, taking the shape of Kaban's bus. After Serval and Caracal defeat the Cerulean, Kaban gives Kyururu one of her Lucky Beast guides, telling her to seek out Margay should she need any help. As the gang resumes their journey, Caracal recognizes Kaban from Serval's tales of traveling with a human.
7	"Beyond Speed"; Transliteration: "Supīdo no Mukou" (Japanese: すぴーどのむこう)	February 25, 2019
In the desert, Kyururu's group comes across a cheetah who is challenged to a race by a pronghorn, with Serval deciding to participate. After the race ends in a stalemate due to running out of track, Kyururu sets up a circular track and proposes a relay race with Caracal, Cheetah, and Serval on one team and Greater Roadrunner and Pronghorn on the other. Just as the race reaches its final leg, the gang are attacked by another vehicular Cerulean. When Pronghorn sprains her leg, Cheetah steps in to rescue her, outmaneuvering the Cerulean in the process. Afterward, Kyururu gains a new vehicle to take her group to their next destination.
8	"New Song in Concert"; Transliteration: "Shinkyoku Raibu" (Japanese: しんきょくらいぶ)	March 4, 2019
Kyururu's group arrive at the live stage and meet up with Margay, who has them take part in a play for the opening act of PPP's next concert. Following a bad rehearsal, PPP decide to cancel the play, leaving Margay downhearted. However, when the PPP gets held up upon being pestered by Alma and Sen, Kyururu and the others put on the play themselves, which proves to be a hit despite the appearance of an actual Cerulean, buying enough time for PPP to take the stage. Following the concert, Kyururu gets captured by Alma and Sen, who take them to see a certain Friend.
9	"Go Back Home"; Transliteration: "Ouchi ni Okaeri" (Japanese: おうちにおかえり)	March 11, 2019
Alma and Sen deliver Kyururu to their client, Domestic Dog, who has been waiting a long time to meet a human and takes Kyururu back to a set of human houses. When the others catch up to them and assume Kyururu has found her home, Caracal argues with her and starts making her way back home. Upon learning that a Beast is nearby, Kyururu goes off to try and warn Serval and Caracal, only to come up against the Beast herself. Dog gets injured protecting Kyururu, Serval, and Caracal, who had realized her folly, return to fight off the Beast, after which Dog encourages Kyururu to continue traveling with her friends.
10	"Check-in"; Transliteration: "Chekku-in" (Japanese: ちぇっくいん)	March 18, 2019
While searching for her sketchbook, Kyururu finds it in the hands of a western parotia and a greater lophorina, who question her motive for finding her house. Afterwards, the gang meet a passenger pigeon, who takes them to a hotel run by a bat-eared fox, a domestic pig and an Okinawan habu. Meanwhile, Kaban discovers that the recent appearance of Ceruleans resembling Friends has something to do with Kyururu's sketchbook, after which she is joined by Fennec and Raccoon. Back at the hotel, Kyururu gives a drawing of all the Friends she has encountered to Pigeon, who states she hasn't come across any human towns during her travels. As Kyururu worries over whether she even had a house, to begin with, she ends up falling into the ocean.
11	"The Ocean's Mood"; Transliteration: "Umi no Gokigen" (Japanese: うみのごきげん)	March 25, 2019
While sinking into the ocean, Kyururu has a dream where she once again encounters Parotia and Lophornia, who warns her of an impending crisis. She is then rescued by Dolphin and Sea Lion, who inform everyone about the Ceruleans emerging from Kyururu's drawings. Just then, a giant boat-shaped Cerulean attacks the hotel, causing Ceruleum to come into contact with the drawing Kyururu gave Pigeon and spawn Ceruleans of all the Friends drawn on it. As Kyururu desperately tries to find Pigeon, Kaban arrives with all the other Friends in tow to help fight off their Cerulean doppelgangers.
12	"I'm Home"; Transliteration: "Tadaima" (Japanese: ただいま)	April 1, 2019
Kyururu reaches Pigeon as she is attacked by her Cerulean double, which is defeated by the arrival of Serval and the others. Learning that Ceruleans will continue to spawn as long as the drawing remains, Serval and Caracal help Kyururu retrieve the drawing before they are confronted by their Cerulean doubles, sending Kyururu to meet up with Kaban and get the drawing somewhere safe. When the Beast suddenly arrives on the boat, Kyururu decides to take her back to the hotel to take care of the remaining Ceruleans. After the hotel sinks into the ocean, with the Beast still on board, Kaban sees Serval off as she and Caracal join as Kyururu as she gives up searching for her home and instead decides to seek out new adventures. Meanwhile, Dog finds an old drawing of Kyururu.
