= List of My Neighbor Seki episodes =

My Neighbor Seki is an anime television series based on the manga series of the same name written and illustrated by Takuma Morishige. The anime is directed by Yūji Mutoh and produced by the animation studio Shin-Ei Animation. The series was broadcast in Japan on TV Tokyo on Sunday nights starting January 5, 2014, (Note: Although the broadcast premiere was posted to be Sunday, January 5, at 2:05, TV Tokyo uses an after-midnight programming schedule so that the first broadcast was listed at Sunday, January 5, at 26:05, which is Monday, January 6, at 2:05am. The AT-X broadcast premiered on January 6 at 11:00am.: "On Air". t-sekikun.jp (Tonari no Seki-kun anime official website) (in Japanese). Archived from the original on 2014-01-07. – announcement of original episode; "Week program: TV Tokyo". TV Tokyo. Archived from the original on 2014-03-15. – TV Tokyo schedule, showing the episode running at 26:05) followed by a broadcast on AT-X Monday mornings; it was also simulcast by Crunchyroll as Tonari no Seki-kun: The Master of Killing Time. The series ran for 21 episodes of about 8 minutes each. An original video animation DVD was bundled with the limited edition fifth manga volume released on January 4, 2014. The series was released on DVD in two parts on May 28, 2014, with each disc with a bonus episode. The opening theme is "Meiwaku Spectacle" (迷惑スペクタクル, Meiwaku Supekutakuru; "Nuisance Spectacle") by Kana Hanazawa, and the ending theme is "Set Them Free" by Akira Jimbo. Sentai Filmworks acquired the license to the series on December 17, 2015; the English dub of the series was released on DVD on July 7, 2020, with the episodes premiered on the HIDIVE streaming service on June 11, 2021.

== Episode list ==
No.	Title	Original release date
1	"Domino"; Transliteration: "Domino" (Japanese: ドミノ)	January 5, 2014
Rumi Yokoi observes her neighbor classmate, Toshinari Seki, as he constructs an elaborate domino show using erasers, trying to stop him before he is noticed by the teacher.
2	"Shogi"; Transliteration: "Shōgi" (Japanese: 将棋)	January 12, 2014
Seki plays an abnormal game of shogi, depicting a melodramatic story of loyalty and betrayal that Rumi cannot help but get invested and which she tries to intervene.
3	"Desk Polishing"; Transliteration: "Tsukue-migaki" (Japanese: 机みがき)	January 19, 2014
Seki obsessively polishes up his desk, achieving a mirror-like shine, and seeks more things to polish from Rumi.
4	"Go"; Transliteration: "Igo" (Japanese: 囲碁)	January 26, 2014
Taking out a set of Go pieces, Seki arranges them into pictures involving a bear and a rabbit.
5	"Eraser Stamp"; Transliteration: "Keshigomu Hanko" (Japanese: 消しゴムはんこ)	February 2, 2014
During science class, Seki's attempts at constructing a hanko stamp from his eraser are hindered by his laid-back classmate, Akiyasu Uzawa.
6	"Disaster Drill"; Transliteration: "Hinan Kunren" (Japanese: 避難訓練)	February 9, 2014
Whilst participating in a disaster drill, Rumi notices that a robot family that Seki has brought into class is taking the drill more seriously than Seki himself, prompting her to take responsibility for them.
7	"Note Passing"; Transliteration: "Tegami mawashi" (Japanese: 手紙まわし)	February 9, 2014 (Note: Two episodes were presented on February 9, 2014.)
Seki creates an elaborate post office system for passing notes around the class; with many protocols that prevent Rumi from giving him a note of her own.
8	"Shogi 2"; Transliteration: "Shōgi Ni" (Japanese: 将棋②)	February 23, 2014
Seki crafts another shogi tale, this time depicting a princess who marries a pawn but is soon kidnapped.
9	"Knitting"; Transliteration: "Amimono" (Japanese: 編み物)	March 2, 2014
As Seki knits in class, Rumi watches him as an expert, but is surprised by some of his maneuvers as well as the final product.
10	"Golf"; Transliteration: "Gorufu" (Japanese: ゴルフ)	March 9, 2014
During art class, Seki plays a miniature-sized game of golf on his worn-out desk, whilst Rumi's classmate, Sakurako Gotō, misinterprets the interactions between Rumi and Seki as romantic gestures.
11	"Climbing"; Transliteration: "Tozan" (Japanese: 登山)	March 16, 2014
Rumi watches in harrowing anticipation as Seki has a group of miniature bears do a mountain climbing expedition on the back of their classmate, Takahiro Maeda.
12	"RC Car"; Transliteration: "Rajikon" (Japanese: ラジコン)	March 23, 2014
Seki studies a set of driving rules, takes a written driving test, and then makes a driving course on his desk for a remote-controlled car, which he takes very seriously.
13	"Pool"; Transliteration: "Pūru" (Japanese: プール)	March 30, 2014
During water safety lessons, Rumi once again becomes invested in the diligence of the robot family, becoming panicked when the child robot is thrown into the pool by Uzawa.
14	"Lunch"; Transliteration: "Obentō" (Japanese: お弁当)	April 6, 2014
During lunch break, Rumi is a little disturbed by the manner in which Seki eats the octopus weiners he made for his lunch.
15	"Paper Sumo"; Transliteration: "Kamizumō" (Japanese: 紙ずもう)	April 13, 2014
Whilst Rumi is off school with a cold, Goto observes Seki as he plays a game of paper sumo involving a robot opponent, assuming he had a fight with Rumi.
16	"Shogi vs. Chess"; Transliteration: "Shogi tai Chesu" (Japanese: 将棋vsチェス)	April 20, 2014
As the class watches an instructional video, Seki plays a game of "Shogi vs. Chess" in the dark, with Rumi eager to help the shogi pieces as they struggle against the black chess pieces hidden in the darkness.
17	"Fukuwarai"; Transliteration: "Fukuwarai" (Japanese: 福笑い)	April 27, 2014
Seki puts on a blindfold and plays a game of fukuwarai, which soon evolves into a twisting story about family life.
18	"Magic"; Transliteration: "Tejina" (Japanese: 手品)	May 4, 2014
With their desks pushed together in order to share a printout, Rumi attempts to ignore Seki as he performs some card tricks, hoping to prompt a reaction from her.
19	"Glasses"; Transliteration: "Megane" (Japanese: 眼鏡)	May 11, 2014
Seki brings various pairs of glasses to see which pair looks the best on him.
20	"Flipbook"; Transliteration: "Parapara Manga" (Japanese: パラパラ漫画)	May 18, 2014
Seki draws a flip book comic in his textbook, which he even records sound effects to, leaving Rumi curious about the finished result.
21	"Personal Belongings Inspection"; Transliteration: "Mochimono Kensa" (Japanese: 持ち物検査)	May 25, 2014
Rumi learns of a surprise belongings inspection, believing it to be the perfect chance for Seki to get busted. However, she becomes concerned about the robot family, especially when Seki seems to make no attempts to hide them properly.

=== OVA episodes ===
No.	Title	Original release date
OAD	"Bo-taoshi"; Transliteration: "Bōtaoshi" (棒倒し)	January 4, 2014
OAD	"Cats"; Transliteration: "Neko" (猫)	January 4, 2014
Seki attempts a game of 'Topple the Flag' on his desk, going to extreme lengths to scoop as much sand as possible from a pile without toppling the flag atop of it. Later, Seki brings a pair of cats to school, prompting some jealousy from Rumi as he keeps their cuteness to himself.
Special–1	"Field Trip"; Transliteration: "Rinkan Gakkō" (Japanese: 林間学校)	May 28, 2014
During a hiking trip, Rumi's group comes across various signs pertaining to a medieval quest left behind by Seki when he was younger, which prove embarrassing for him now.
Special–2	"Snow Play"; Transliteration: "Yuki Asobi" (Japanese: 雪あそび)	May 28, 2014
On a snowy day, Seki makes a snow rabbit and sticks it in the middle of a frozen pond with the intention of sinking it, prompting Rumi to try and protect it from him.

== Home release ==
(Japan, Region 2)
Volume	Episodes	DVD release date	Ref
Tonari no Seki-Kun – Volume 1 (となりの関くん 上)	Episodes 1–10 + Special 1	May 28, 2014	
Tonari no Seki-Kun – Volume 2 (となりの関くん 下)	Episodes 11–21 + Special 2	May 28, 2014	
