= Fukaya-shuku =

Station of the Nakasendō highway in present-day Fukaya, Saitama, Japan

Coordinates: 36.199°N 139.286°E

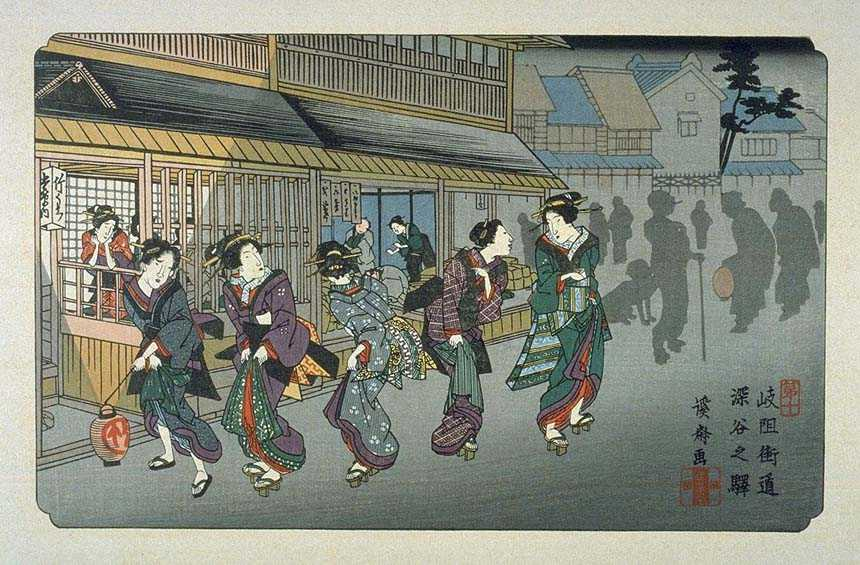
Keisai Eisen's print of Fukaya-shuku, part of the Sixty-nine Stations of the Kiso Kaidō series

Fukaya-shuku (深谷宿, Fukaya-shuku) was the ninth of the sixty-nine stations of the Nakasendō highway connecting Edo with Kyoto during the Edo period It was located in the present-day city of Fukaya, Saitama Prefecture, Japan.

== History ==
Unlike many of the post towns that existed during the Edo period before the creation of the Nakasendō, Fukaya-shuku was established to be a part of the Nakasendō. During the Sengoku period, it was home to Fukaya Castle, belonging to the Uesugi clan, and near the post station was the jin'ya of Okabe Domain, a 20,000 koku holding under the Tokugawa shogunate

Per an 1843 guidebook issued by the Inspector of Highways (道中奉行, Dōchu-būgyō), the town had one honjin, four waki-honjin, and 80 hatago, with a population of 1928 persons.

Fukaya-shuku was approximately 20 ri 27 cho from the starting point of the Nakasendō at Nihonbashi, which made it the favored stopping point for merchant-class travelers on their second day out from Edo, especially since Fukaya-shuku was famous for its large number of Meshimori onna and numerous chaya, whereas the previous station, Kumagai-shuku had neither.

Two large (4 meter tall) stone lanterns marked the entry to Fukaya-shuku, and these lanterns still exist. The gate of the former honjin has also been preserved.

== Fukaya-shuku in The Sixty-nine Stations of the Kiso Kaidō ==
Keisai Eisen's ukiyo-e print of Fukaya-shuku dates from 1835–1838. The print depicts four meshimori onna on the road accompanied by a servant carrying a lantern. The sign on the lantern read “take”, advertising "Takenouchi" one of the publishers of the series of prints. To the left, more prostitutes are waiting in a display window, similar to the brothels of Yoshiwara, with a signboard again advertising "Takenouchi". In the center of the composition, two travelers are taking off their footwear and are preparing to enter the establishment. To the right are numerous other people, depicted as shadows in the early evening.

== Neighboring post towns ==
Nakasendō
Kumagai-shuku - Fukaya-shuku - Honjō-shuku
