= Warabi-shuku =

Coordinates: 35°49′30.25″N 139°40′45.17″E

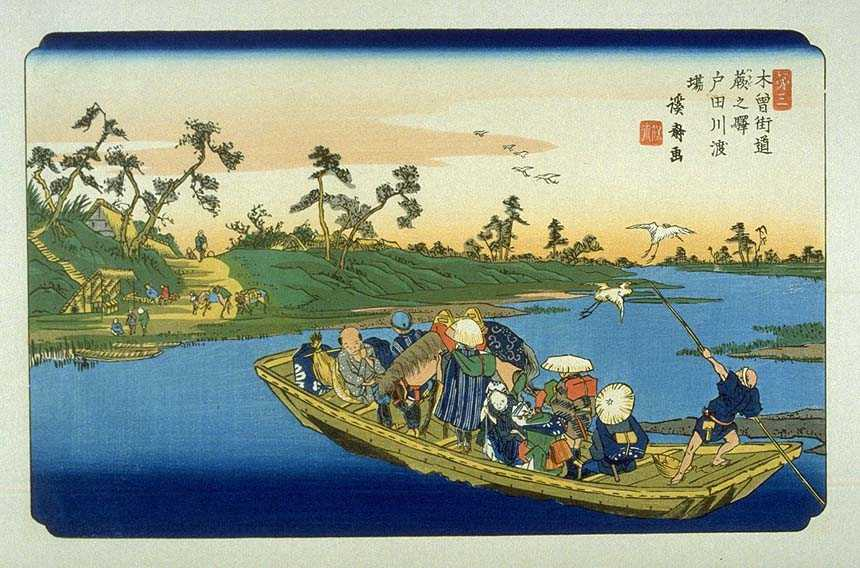
Keisai Eisen's print of Warabi-shuku, part of the Sixty-nine Stations of the Kiso Kaidō series

Warabi-shuku (蕨宿, Warabi-shuku) was the second of the sixty-nine stations of the Nakasendō highway connecting Edo with Kyoto during the Edo period. It was located in the present-day city of Warabi, Saitama Prefecture, Japan.

== History ==
Warabi was originally built up as a castle town during the Muromachi period for the Shibukawa clan. Under the Tokugawa shogunate of the Edo period, Warabi-shuku became a post town on the Nakasendō from 1612.

Per an 1843 guidebook issued by the Inspector of Highways (道中奉行, Dōchu-būgyō), the town stretched for about 1.1 kilometers along the highway, with a population of 2223 (1138 men, 1085 women) in 430 houses, and boasted two honjin, one waki-honjin, one tonya and 23 hatago. Until the late Edo period, Warabi-shuku was infamous for its aggressive meshimori onna and numerous chaya.

Warabi-shuku was approximately 4 ri, 28-chō (18.8 kilometers) from the starting point of the Nakasendō at Nihonbashi, which was the approximate distance the average traveler could walk in half a day. However, the station was separated from neighboring Itabashi-shuku by the Arakawa River. The river formed an outer line of defense for Edo, and therefore the Tokugawa shogunate forbid the erection of any bridges as a defensive measure.

The modern city of Warabi has preserved the gate and part of one of the honjin as a museum.

== Warabi-shuku in The Sixty-nine Stations of the Kiso Kaidō ==
Keisai Eisen's ukiyo-e print of Warabi-shuku dates from 1835 to 1838, and depicts the ferry crossing the Arakawa River at dusk. On the small boat are a pair of itinerant blind women musicians with shamisen, a man and his horse, and a porter sitting smoking in the bow. The boatman propels the boat with a rear oar, while on the far bank more travelled await the arrival of the ferry.

== Neighboring post towns ==
Nakasendō
Itabashi-shuku - Warabi-shuku - Urawa-shuku
