= Kumagai-shuku =

Coordinates: 36°08′40″N 139°23′04″E

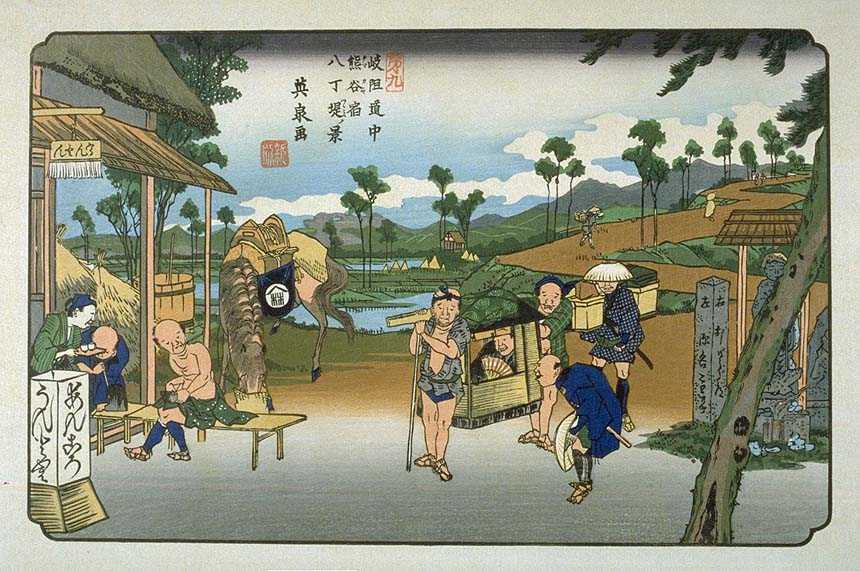
Keisai Eisen's print of Kumagai-shuku, part of the Sixty-nine Stations of the Kiso Kaidō series

Kumagai-shuku (熊谷宿, Kumagai-shuku) was the eighth of the sixty-nine stations of the Nakasendō highway connecting Edo with Kyoto during the Edo period. It was located in the present-day city of Kumagaya, Saitama Prefecture, Japan.

== History ==
Kumagai-shuku began as a temple-town outside the Buddhist temple of Yūkoku-ji (熊谷寺), which dated from the Heian period. The kanji which make up the temple name can also be read as Kumagaya or Kumagai. Kumagaya Naozane was a noted Kamakura period samurai who served under Minamoto no Yoritomo.

Kumagai-shuku became formalized as a post station on the Nakasendō under the Tokugawa shogunate in 1603. Per an 1843 guidebook issued by the Inspector of Highways (道中奉行, Dōchu-būgyō), the town has 1715 buildings, with a population of 3263, and boasted two honjin, one waki-honjin and 42 hatago

From the Meiji period, the area around Kumagai-shuku flourished as a producer of barley and silk.

Kumagai was 16.4 kilometers from Kōnosu-shuku and due to the distance an ai no shuku, Fukiage-shuku was located in-between the two stations. However, many travelers preferred to travel on to Fukaya-shuku for the night, as it was famous for its large number of Meshimori onna and numerous chaya, whereas the previous station, Kumagai-shuku had neither.

Most of what remained of Kumagai-shuku was destroyed by in the Bombing of Kumagaya in World War II. The site of one of the honjin is commemorated by a stone monument.

== Kumagai-shuku in The Sixty-nine Stations of the Kiso Kaidō ==
Keisai Eisen's ukiyo-e print of Kumagai-shuku dates from c. 1835–1838. This complicated composition is set at a fork in the highway, with a sign pointing in the direction of Oshi Castle in one direction and Fukaya-shuku in the other. A way-side tea-house is located in the fork of the road, advertising udon noodles and ankoro (a sweet bean paste). A wealthy travelers in a palanquin is arriving together with his servant, and a guest at the tea house is being serviced by a waitress. A pack-horse man, naked to the waist, is waiting with his horse. The horse has a blanket with the word Take, advertising "Takenouchi" the owner of "Hoeidoh", the publishers of the series of prints. In the far right is a stone statue of Jizō Bosatsu, protector of travelers.

== Neighboring post towns ==
Nakasendō
Kōnosu-shuku - (Fukiage-shuku) - Kumagai-shuku - Fukaya-shuku
