= Honjō-shuku =

Coordinates: 36.2404°N 139.1915°E

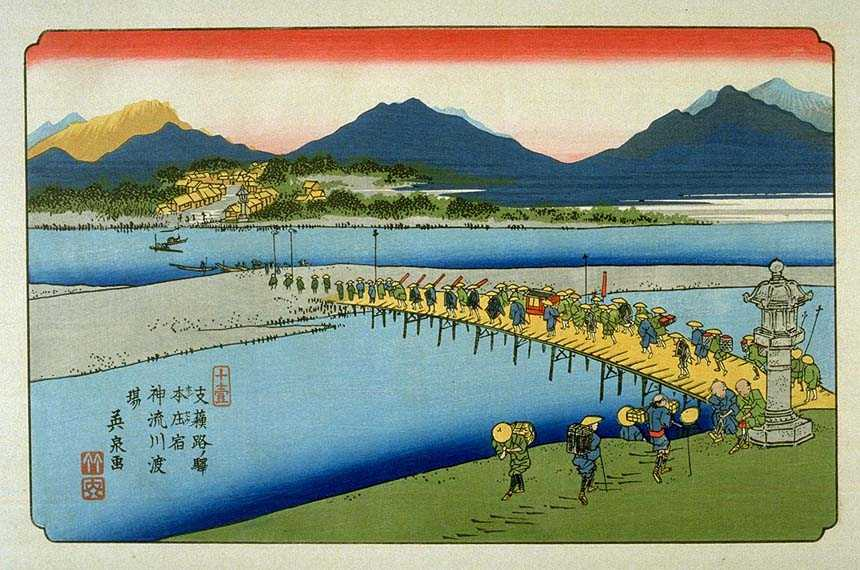
Keisai Eisen's print of Honjō-shuku, part of the Sixty-nine Stations of the Kiso Kaidō series

Honjō-shuku (本庄宿, Honjō-shuku) was the tenth of the sixty-nine stations of the Nakasendō highway connecting Edo with Kyoto during the Edo period. It was the largest of the stations in terms of population and number of buildings. It was located in the present-day city of Honjō, Saitama Prefecture, Japan.

== History ==
Honjō was the site of Honjō Castle, the stronghold of the Honjō clan since the Kamakura period. The Honjō were destroyed by Toyotomi Hideyoshi in 1590, and the territory came under the control of Tokugawa Ieyasu, who established in 10,000 koku Honjō Domain, which was ruled by the Ogasawara clan from 1698 to 1612. A honjin was built near the site of the old castle in the northern part of the castle town, which quickly redeveloped itself into a shukuba. Due to the number of travelers, a second honjin was built at the opposite end of town in 1792.

Per an 1843 guidebook issued by the Inspector of Highways (道中奉行, Dōchu-būgyō), the town stretched for about 1.9 kilometers along the highway, with a population of 4554, with 1212 shops. The town boasted two very large scale honjin, two waki-honjin, 475 hatago, as well as 54 establishments whose attraction was primarily meshimori onna. Honjō-shuku was approximately 22 ri from the starting point of the Nakasendō at Nihonbashi, and was the last stop in Musashi Province.

Very little evidence of the shukuba remains in the modern city of Honjō, but the gate of the first honjin, the Tamura Honjin, remains. On the site of the honjin itself, a police station was built in 1883 in the western-style of architecture of the Meiji period. This too has been preserved as a local history museum.

== Honjō-shuku in The Sixty-nine Stations of the Kiso Kaidō ==
Keisai Eisen's ukiyo-e print of Honjō-shuku dates from 1835–1838. The print depicts the crossing of the Kanna River which marks the border between Musashi and Kōzuke Provinces. The time is dusk, and a daimyō procession with a closed palanquin is crossing a bridge, which only extends to a sand bank halfway across the river. As part of the Tokugawa shogunate's security precautions, the deeper part of the river is not bridged, but must be crossed by ferry. Large stone lanterns mark the crossing point. In the distance are the mountains of Mount Akagi, Mount Haruna and Mount Myōgi. The village on the other side of the river is the next shukuba of the Nakasendō, Shinmachi-shuku.

== Neighboring post towns ==
Nakasendō
Fukaya-shuku - Honjō-shuku - Shinmachi-shuku
