= Kōnosu-shuku =

Coordinates: 36°03′32.83″N 139°30′48.63″E

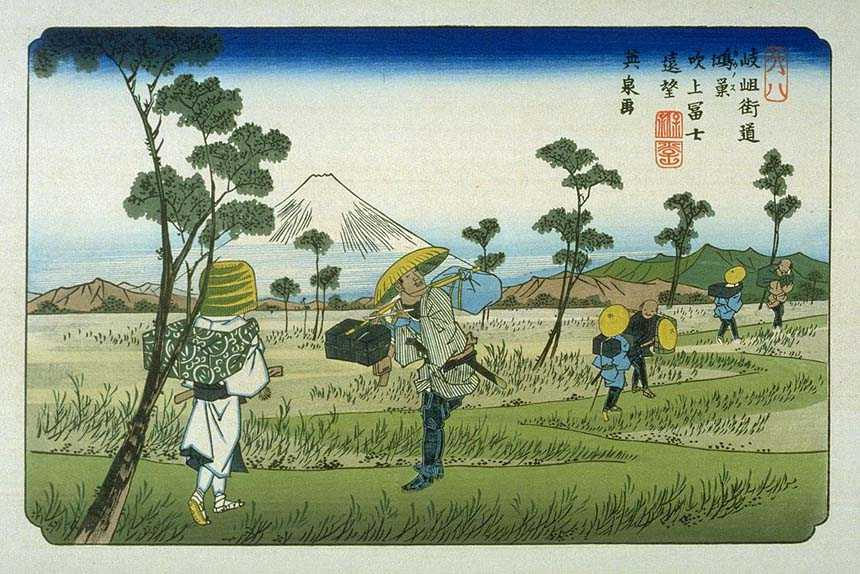
Keisai Eisen's print of Kōnosu-shuku, part of the Sixty-nine Stations of the Kiso Kaidō series

Kōnosu-shuku (鴻巣宿, Kōnosu-shuku) was the seventh of the sixty-nine stations of the Nakasendō highway connecting Edo with Kyoto during the Edo period. It was located in the present-day city of Kōnosu, Saitama Prefecture, Japan.

== History ==
The original Kōnosu-shuku was located in what is now the city of Kitamoto; however, when the system of post stations on the Nakasendō was formalized by the Tokugawa shogunate in 1602, the post station relocated to the north to its current location. The new location was approximately 18 ri, 8-chō from the starting point of the Nakasendō at Nihonbashi, or approximately 48 kilometers. It was 16.4 kilometers from Kumagai-shuku and 7.2 kilometers from the following Okegawa-juku. Due to the distance between Kōnosu-shuku and Kumagai-shuku, an ai no shuku, Fukiage-shuku was located in-between.

The reason for the move is unclear today, but in its new location the Nakasendō was not the only road running through Kōnosu-shuku. It also had roads connecting to Matsuyama (present-day Higashimatsuyama), Nin (present-day Gyōda), and Kisaichi (present-day Kisai). Most of the post station burned down in a fire in 1767, but was soon rebuilt.

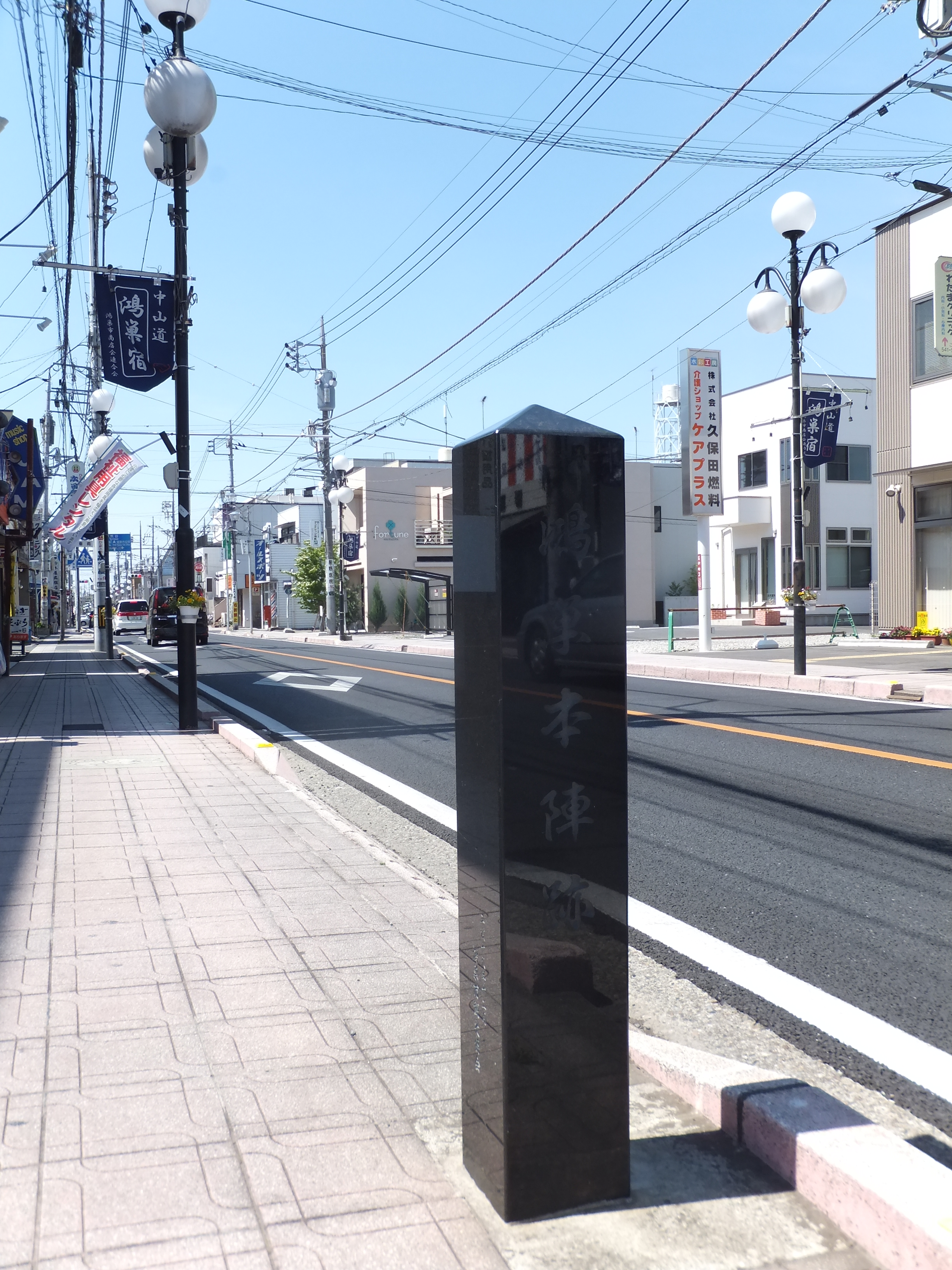
Monument to the location of the honjin of Kōnosu-shuku

Per an 1843 guidebook issued by the Inspector of Highways (道中奉行, Dōchu-būgyō), the town stretched for about 1.9 kilometers along the highway, with a population of 2274 in 556 houses, and boasted one honjin, one waki-honjin, one tonya and 58 hatago.

At the entrance to the post station is Shōgan-ji, a large temple in the Jōdoshū sect. T

== Kōnosu-shuku in The Sixty-nine Stations of the Kiso Kaidō ==
Keisai Eisen's ukiyo-e print of Kōnosu-shuku dates from 1835–1838. The print does now actually show the post station at all, but a landscape with a zig-zag road presumably between Kōnosu and Kumagaya, dominated by a large snow-capped Mount Fuji in the background. In the foreground is a "komusō" mendicant monk with a distinctive straw hat, and a porter heading in the opposite direction with a "kiseru" Japanese smoking pipe. Four other travelers are on the road, heading in the direction of Mount Haruna and Mount Akagi.

== Neighboring post towns ==
Nakasendō
Okegawa-shuku - Kōnosu-shuku – (Fukiage-shuku) - Kumagai-shuku
