= Itabashi-shuku =

Coordinates: 35°45′18.3″N 139°42′33.1″E

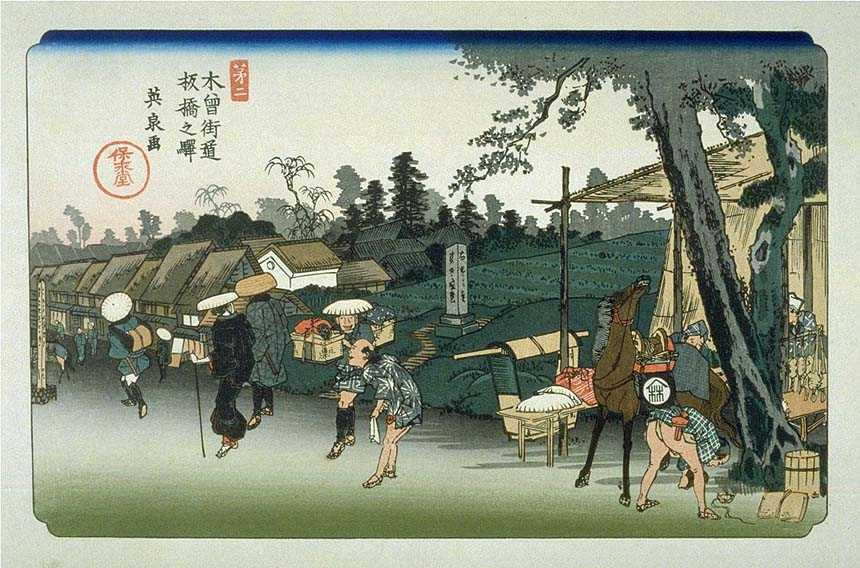
Keisai Eisen's print of Itabashi-shuku, part of the series The Sixty-nine Stations of the Kiso Kaidō

Itabashi-shuku (板橋宿, Itabashi-shuku) was the first of the sixty-nine stations of the Nakasendō. It is located in Itabashi, Tokyo, Japan.

== History ==
During the Edo period, Itabashi-shuku flourished as one of the four post stations in Edo and spread out over two kilometers from north to south. From the north of Tokyo, it was divided into three sections: Kami-shuku (上宿), Naka-shuku (中宿) and Hirao-shuku (平尾宿). Kami-shuku and Naka-shuku were bounded by Itabashi, a bridge spanning the Shakujii River. The honjin and the toiya were located in Naka-shuku. The borders of Hirao-shuku spread until the vicinity of Kanmei-ji.

== Neighboring post towns ==
Nakasendō
Nihonbashi - Itabashi-shuku - Warabi-shuku
