= Kuragano-shuku =

Coordinates: 36.2966°N 139.0477°E

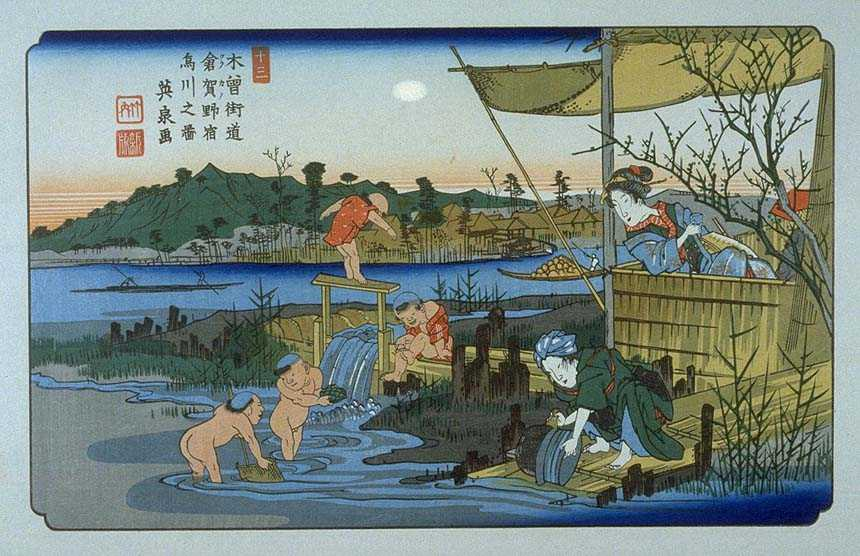
Keisai Eisen's print of Kuragano-shuku, part of The Sixty-nine Stations of the Kiso Kaidō series

Kuragano-shuku (倉賀野宿, Kuragano-shuku) was the twelfth of the sixty-nine stations of the Nakasendō. It is located in the present-day city of Takasaki, Gunma Prefecture, Japan.

== History ==
Kuragano-shuku was an intersection between the Nakasendō and the Nikkō Reiheishi Kaidō. Travelers coming from Kyoto would use this route to get to Nikkō. (If they were coming from Edo, they would have used the Nikkō Kaidō.) During the Edo period, it was a popular port for trader ships on the Karasu River.

== Neighboring post towns ==
Nakasendō
Shinmachi-shuku - Kuragano-shuku - Takasaki-shuku
Nikkō Reiheishi Kaidō
Kuragano-shuku (starting location) - Tamamura-shuku
