= Urawa-shuku =

Coordinates: 35°51′40.9″N 139°39′9.2″E

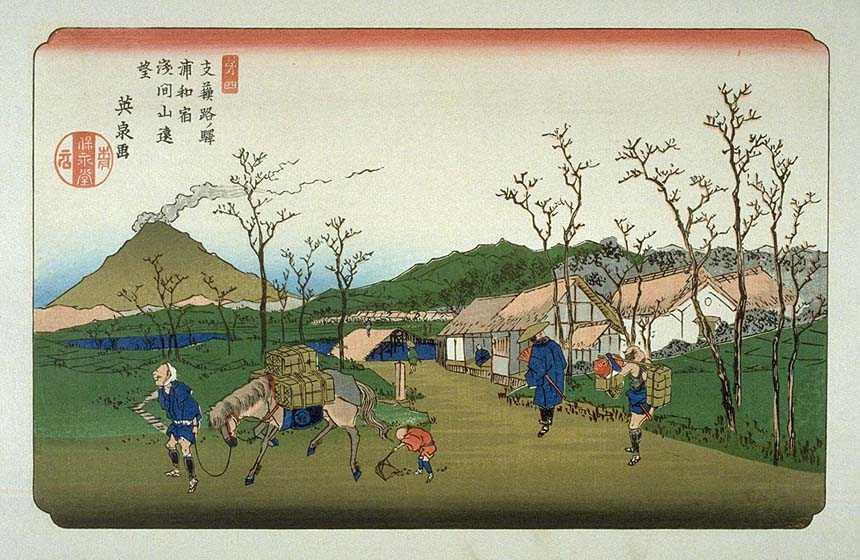
Keisai Eisen's print of Urawa-shuku, part of the series The Sixty-nine Stations of the Kiso Kaidō

Urawa-shuku (浦和宿, Urawa-shuku) was the third of the sixty-nine stations of the Nakasendō. It is located in Urawa-ku in the present-day city of Saitama, Saitama Prefecture, Japan. Its stone ruins can be found 300 meters from Tsuki Shrine (調神社 Tsuki Jinja). Presently, there is a flea market that takes place on the fourth Saturday of every month in Urawa-shuku's Tsuki Shrine.

== Neighboring Post Towns ==
Nakasendō
Warabi-shuku - Urawa-shuku - Ōmiya-shuku
