= Yu Takahashi (singer-songwriter) =

Japanese singer-songwriter (born 1983)

- Born: December 26, 1983 (age 42)
- Origin: Yokote, Akita, Japan
- Genres: Pop, folk
- Occupation: Singer-songwriter
- Instruments: Vocals, guitar
- Years active: 2002–present
- Labels: Amuse (2008–2020); Warner Music Japan (2010–present)
- Website: takahashiyu.com

Yu Takahashi (高橋 優, Takahashi Yū; born December 26, 1983) is a Japanese singer-songwriter. He debuted on a major label in 2010, with his singles "Subarashiki Nichijō" and "Honto no Kimochi".

== Biography ==
Takahashi grew up in Yokote, Akita, in the Tōhoku region of Japan. He started to learn the electric guitar in his final year of middle school, and in high school became the vocalist of a hardcore copy band for two years, performing such songs as Hide with Spread Beaver's "Pink Spider". During high school, he bought a cheap acoustic guitar, and began writing songs. His band broke up as the members went their separate ways, and Takahashi moved to Sapporo to attend a university. He performed in a band in Sapporo as well, however, due to the band dissolution (one member's love life took priority) Takahashi decided to become a solo musician.

In February 2002, Takahashi released his debut album, the self-produced Sepia, of which only 200 copies were produced. Over the next five years, Takahashi performed concerts and released albums based in Sapporo, such as in January 2004, when he performed street lives five times per week. In May 2007, he released his second album, Mugon no Bōryoku, limited to 500 copies. The album was relatively popular in Sapporo, charting at number 1 for three weeks at the Sapporo Stellar Place HMV's in-store independent releases charts. This lead him to hold his first solo concert, to 200 people at the Sapporo Colony. In September 2007, Takahashi began performing monthly live concerts titled Agura (あぐら; "Sit Cross Legged"), in which he would rent a CD shop and only allow 30 people to come inside for the concert.

Takahashi moved to Tokyo in January 2008, to further his music career there. He performed many different concerts, and released a third self-released album, Agura, which was sold only at concert venues. He was scouted by Amuse, an artist management firm especially known for their management of musicians, and came to the notice of Michihiko Yanai, creator of Tower Records' No Music, No Life and Kaze to Rock campaigns. This led to Takahashi releasing his first independent single, the Tower Records exclusive "Kodomo no Uta" in May 2009, followed by his first wide-release album in July, the extended play Bokura no Heisei Rock 'n' Roll, which was produced by Yanai. The extended play reached number 262 on Oricon's national album charts.

A year later, Takahashi made his major label debut under Warner, with the single "Subarashiki Nichijō". The song received heavy radio play, causing it to reach number 5 on Billboard's Japan Hot 100 chart, despite only reaching number 57 on Oricon's physical single sales chart. His second single, "Honto no Kimochi", was used as the theme song for the Takeru Satoh and Atsuko Maeda (AKB48) starring drama Q10, giving Takahashi his first top 30 single and his first performance on music show Music Station.

Since the summer of 2016, he has hosted AKITA CARAVAN MUSIC FES every year in his hometown Akita Prefecture.

He announced to leave Amuse Inc. on June 30, 2020. Then he set up a personal office with his manager.

== Discography ==
=== Studio albums ===
List of albums, with selected chart positions
Title	Album details	Peak positions	Sales (JPN)
Title	Album details	JPN	Sales (JPN)
Sepia	200 copies produced; Released: February 2002; Label: Self-released; Formats: CD	—	—
Mugon no Bōryoku (無言の暴力; "The Violence of Silence")	500 copies produced; Released: May 16, 2007; Label: Takotako Label; Formats: CD	—	—
Agura (胡座～agura～; "Crossed Legged")	Sold only at concerts; Released: 2008; Label: Amuse; Formats: CD	—	—
Real Time Singer Songwriter (リアルタイム・シンガーソングライター, Riaru Taimu Shingā Songuraitā)	Released: April 20, 2011; Label: Warner; Formats: CD, CD/DVD, digital download	8	34,000
Kono Koe (この声; "This Voice")	Released: March 14, 2012; Label: Warner; Formats: CD, CD/DVD, digital download	9	22,000
Break My Silence	Released: July 10, 2013; Label: Warner; Formats: CD, 2CD, digital download	9	20,000
Ima, Soko ni Aru Meimetsu to Gunjō (今、そこにある明滅と群生)	Released: August 6, 2014; Label: Warner; Formats: CD, CD/DVD, digital download	6	21,000

=== Compilation albums ===
List of albums, with selected chart positions
Title	Album details	Peak positions	Sales (JPN)
Title	Album details	JPN	Sales (JPN)
Yu Takahashi Best 2009-2015: Warau Yakusoku (高橋優 BEST 2009-2015 『笑う約束』; "Laughing Promise")	Released: July 22, 2015; Label: Warner; Formats: CD, digital download	3	55,000
15th Anniversary Best Jyū-gonen (自由悟然; "Freedom Enlightenment")	Released: December 10, 2025; Label: Warner; Formats: 3×CD, digital download	4	12,203

=== Extended plays ===
List of extended plays, with selected chart positions
Title	Album details	Peak positions	Sales (JPN)
Title	Album details	JPN	Sales (JPN)
Bokura no Heisei Rock 'n' Roll (僕らの平成ロックンロール; "Our Heisei Era Rock 'n' Roll")	Released: July 8, 2009; Label: Amuse; Formats: CD, digital download	242	1,700
Bokura no Heisei Rock 'n' Roll 2 (僕らの平成ロックンロール②; "Our Heisei Era Rock 'n' Roll 2")	Released: December 26, 2012; Label: Warner; Formats: CD, CD/DVD, digital download	13	13,000

=== Singles ===
==== As a lead artist ====
List of singles, with selected chart positions
Title	Year	Peak chart positions		Sales	Certifications	Album
Title	Year	Oricon Singles Charts	Billboard Japan Hot 100 (Note: Sources for chart positions are as follows: "Subarashiki Nichijō", "Honto no Kimochi", "Fukuwarai", "Shōnen de Are", "Dare ga Tame ni Kane wa Naru", "Dare mo Inai Daidokoro", "Sotsugyō", "Kimama Love Song", "Hi wa Mata Noboru", "Yoake o Matteiru", "Bowling", "(Where's) The Silent Majority?", "Onaji Sora no Shita", "Pioneer", "Tabibito", "Taiyō to Hana", "Asu e no Hoshi", "Ashita wa Kitto Ii Hi ni Naru", "Feel".)	Sales	Certifications	Album
"Kodomo no Uta" (こどものうた; "Song for Youth")	2009	—	—	—		Bokura no Heisei Rock 'n' Roll
"Subarashiki Nichijō" (素晴らしき日常; "The Amazing Everyday")	2010	57	5	5,000		Real Time Singer Songwriter
"Honto no Kimochi" (ほんとのきもち; "Real Feelings")	2010	24	10	9,000	RIAJ (download): Gold	Real Time Singer Songwriter
"Fukuwarai" (福笑い; "Lucky Laugh")	2011	15	4	14,000	RIAJ (download): Gold	Real Time Singer Songwriter
"Genjitsu to Iu Na no Kaibutsu to Tatakau Monotachi" (現実という名の怪物と戦う者たち; "Those Who Fight the Monster Known as Reality")	2011	15	—	14,000		Real Time Singer Songwriter
"Dare ga Tame ni Kane wa Naru" (誰がために鐘は鳴る; "For Whom The Bell Tolls")	2011	20	9	8,000		Kono Koe
"Dare mo Inai Daidokoro" (誰もいない台所; "A Kitchen with No One In")	2011	14	17	8,000		Kono Koe
"Sotsugyō" (卒業; "Graduation")	2012	9	3	12,000		Kono Koe
"Hi wa Mata Noboru" (陽はまた昇る; "The Sun Will Rise Again")	2012	18	9	12,000		Break My Silence
"(Where's) The Silent Majority?"	2013	12	8	8,000		Break My Silence
"Onaji Sora no Shita" (同じ空の下; "Under the Same Sky")	2013	15	6	9,000		Break My Silence
"Pioneer" (パイオニア, Paionia)	2014	12	13	8,000		Ima, Soko ni Aru Meimetsu to Gunjō
"Tabibito" (旅人; "Voyager")	2014	12	86	8,000		Ima, Soko ni Aru Meimetsu to Gunjō
"Taiyō to Hana" (太陽と花; "The Sun and Flowers")	2014	12	5	16,000	RIAJ (download): Gold	Ima, Soko ni Aru Meimetsu to Gunjō
"Ashita wa Kitto Ii Hi ni Naru" (明日はきっといい日になる; "Tomorrow Will Surely Be a Good Day")	2015	12	15	11,000	RIAJ: Gold (st.)	Non-album single

==== As a featured artist ====
List of singles, with selected chart positions
Title	Year	Peak chart positions	Album
Title	Year	JPN Hot 100	Album
"Feel" (among Unborde All Stars)	2016	53	Feel + Unborde Greatest Hits

==== Promotional singles ====
Title	Year	Peak chart positions	Album
Title	Year	Billboard Japan Hot 100	Album
"Shōnen de Are" (少年であれ; "As a Boy")	2011	59	Real Time Singer Songwriter
"Kimama Love Song" (気ままラブソング; "A Love Song My Way")	2012	70	Kono Koe
"Yoake o Matteiru" (夜明けを待っている; "Waiting for the Dawn")	2013	39	Bokura no Heisei Rock 'n' Roll 2
"Bowling" (ボーリング; "Bōringu")	2013	46	Bokura no Heisei Rock 'n' Roll 2
"Candy"	2013	—	Break My Silence
"Asu e no Hoshi" (明日への星; "Star to Tomorrow")	2014	53	Ima, Soko ni Aru Meimetsu to Gunjō
"Oyasumi" (おやすみ; "Good Night")	2014	—	Ima, Soko ni Aru Meimetsu to Gunjō

=== Video albums ===
List of media, with selected chart positions
Title	Album details	Peak positions
Title	Album details	JPN
Takahashi Yu Live Tour: Kono Koe tte Dare? Takahashi Yu ja Nai? 2012 at Shibuya Kōkaidō 2012.7.1 (高橋優LIVE TOUR～この声って誰?高橋優じゃなぁい? 2012 at 渋谷公会堂2012.7.1; "Yu Takahashi Live Tour: Whose Voice Is That? Isn't It Yu Takahashi? at Shibuya Public Hall July 1, 2012")	Released: December 6, 2012; Label: Warner; Formats: DVD	21
Takahashi Yu Music Video-shū 2009—2013: Danyū (高橋優MUSIC VIDEO集2009—2013 男優; "Yu Takahashi Music Video Collection 2009—2013: Actor")	Released: September 25, 2013; Label: Warner; Formats: DVD	28
Takahashi Yu 2013 Nippon Budōkan: You Can Break the Silence in Budokan (高橋優2013日本武道館)	Released: May 28, 2014; Label: Warner; Formats: DVD, Blu-ray	7
