= Ōmiya-shuku =

Ōmiya-shuku 大宮宿
- Station of the Nakasendō
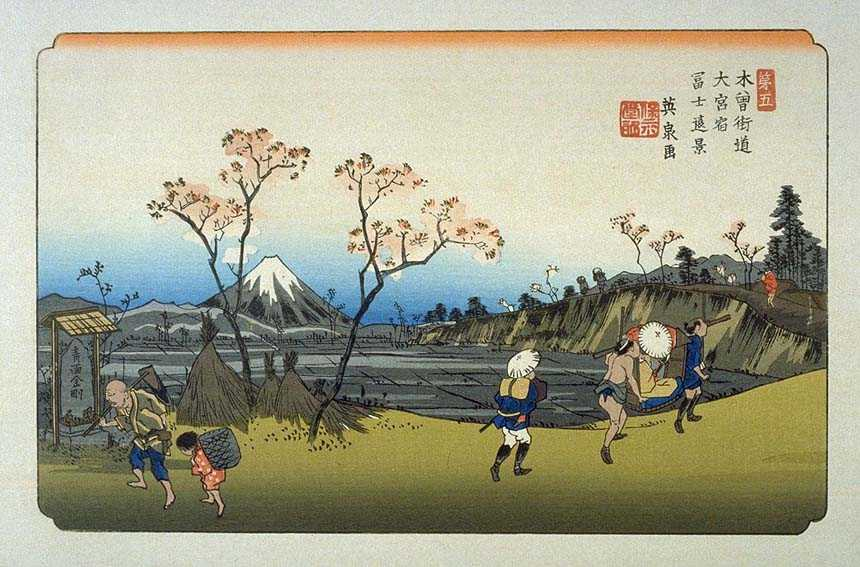
- Keisai Eisen's print of Ōmiya-shuku, part of the series The Sixty-nine Stations of the Kiso Kaidō
- Interactive map of Ōmiya-shuku
- Coordinates: 35°54′31.5″N 139°37′34.4″E
- Country: Japan
- Prefecture: Saitama

Population (Tenpō era)
  - Total: 1,500
- Time zone: UTC+09:00 (JST)

Ōmiya-shuku (大宮宿, Ōmiya-shuku) was the fourth of the sixty-nine stations of the Nakasendō. It is located in the Ōmiya ward and Kita ward of the present-day city of Saitama, Saitama Prefecture, Japan.

== History ==
Larger than its two neighboring post towns, Urawa-shuku and Ageo-shuku, Ōmiya-shuku was recorded to have had a population of over 1,500 people with over 300 homes during the Tenpō era. It also had the largest number (nine) of secondary honjin along the Nakasendō.

== Neighboring post towns ==
Nakasendō
Urawa-shuku–Ōmiya-shuku–Ageo-shuku
