= Fukiage-shuku =

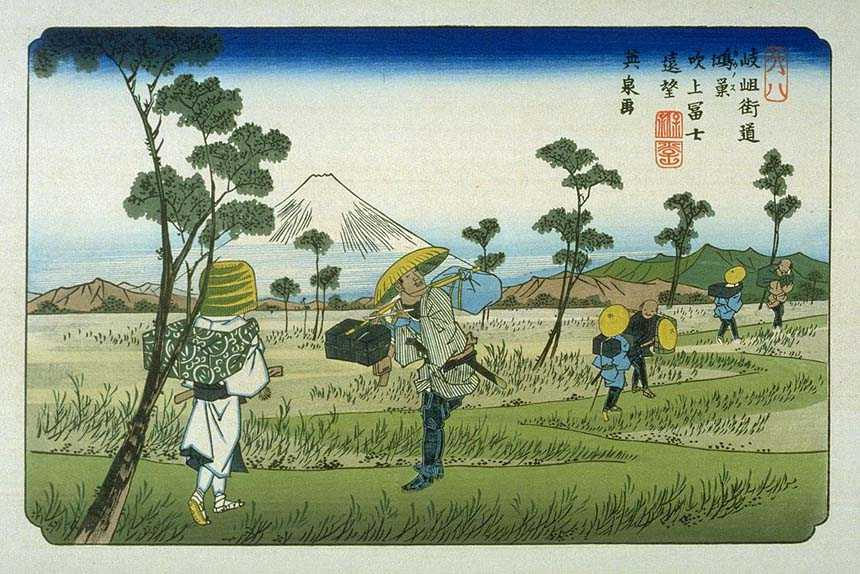
Keisai Eisen's print of Kōnosu-shuku, part of the series The Sixty-nine Stations of the Kiso Kaidō

Fukiage-shuku (吹上宿, Fukiage-shuku) was a mid-station along the Nakasendō in Edo period Japan. It was in between the post stations of Kōnosu-juku and Kumagai-juku. It is located in the present-day town of Kōnosu, Saitama Prefecture, Japan. In addition to being a rest stop along the Nakasendō, it was also an officially designated post station on the Nikkō Wakiōkan.

== Neighboring post towns ==
Nakasendō
Kōnosu-juku - Fukiage-shuku - Kumagai-juku
