= Mordellaria kanoi =

Scientific classification
- Kingdom: Animalia
- Phylum: Arthropoda
- Class: Insecta
- Order: Coleoptera
- Suborder: Polyphaga
- Infraorder: Cucujiformia
- Family: Mordellidae
- Subfamily: Mordellinae
- Tribe: Mordellini
- Genus: Mordellaria
- Species: M. kanoi

Binomial name
- Mordellaria kanoi Kono, 1932

Synonyms
- Mordella kanoi Kono, 1932

Species of beetles

Mordellaria kanoi is a species of tumbling flower beetle in the family Mordellidae. It is found in temperate Asia.
