= Blindfold =

Garment tied to one's head to disable the wearer's sight

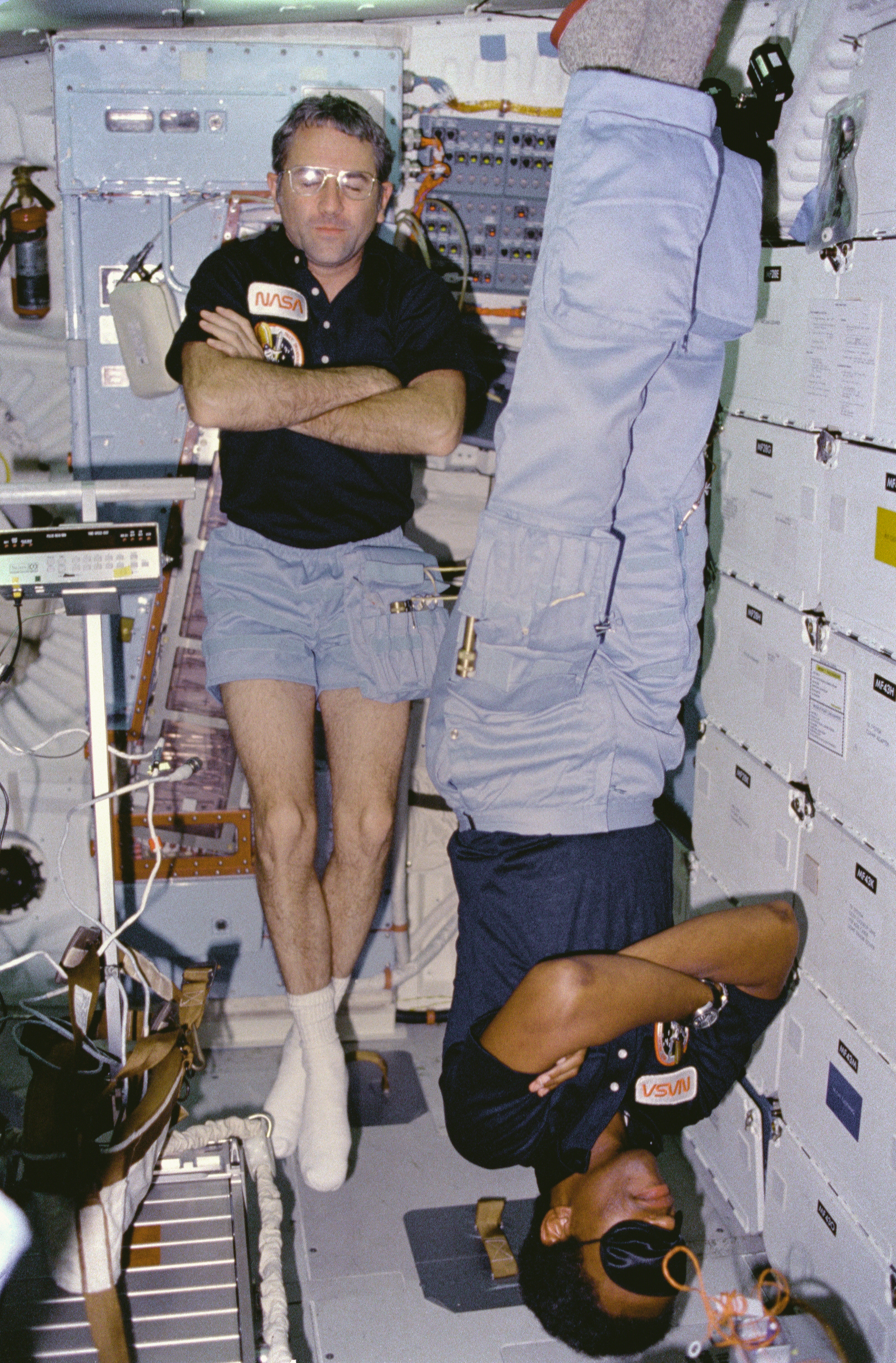
Astronauts Richard H. Truly and Guion Bluford sleeping on board the Challenger. Bluford, in the foreground (upside-down) wears a sleep mask. Astronauts may find it difficult to sleep in space, especially if they are light sensitive.

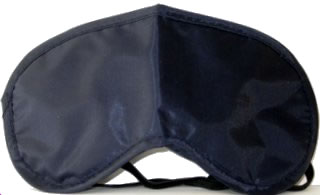
Sleep mask

A blindfold (from Middle English blindfellen) is a garment, usually of cloth, tied to one's head to cover the eyes to disable the wearer's sight. While a properly fitted blindfold prevents sight even if the eyes are open, a poorly tied or trick blindfold may let the wearer see around or even through the blindfold.

== Applications ==
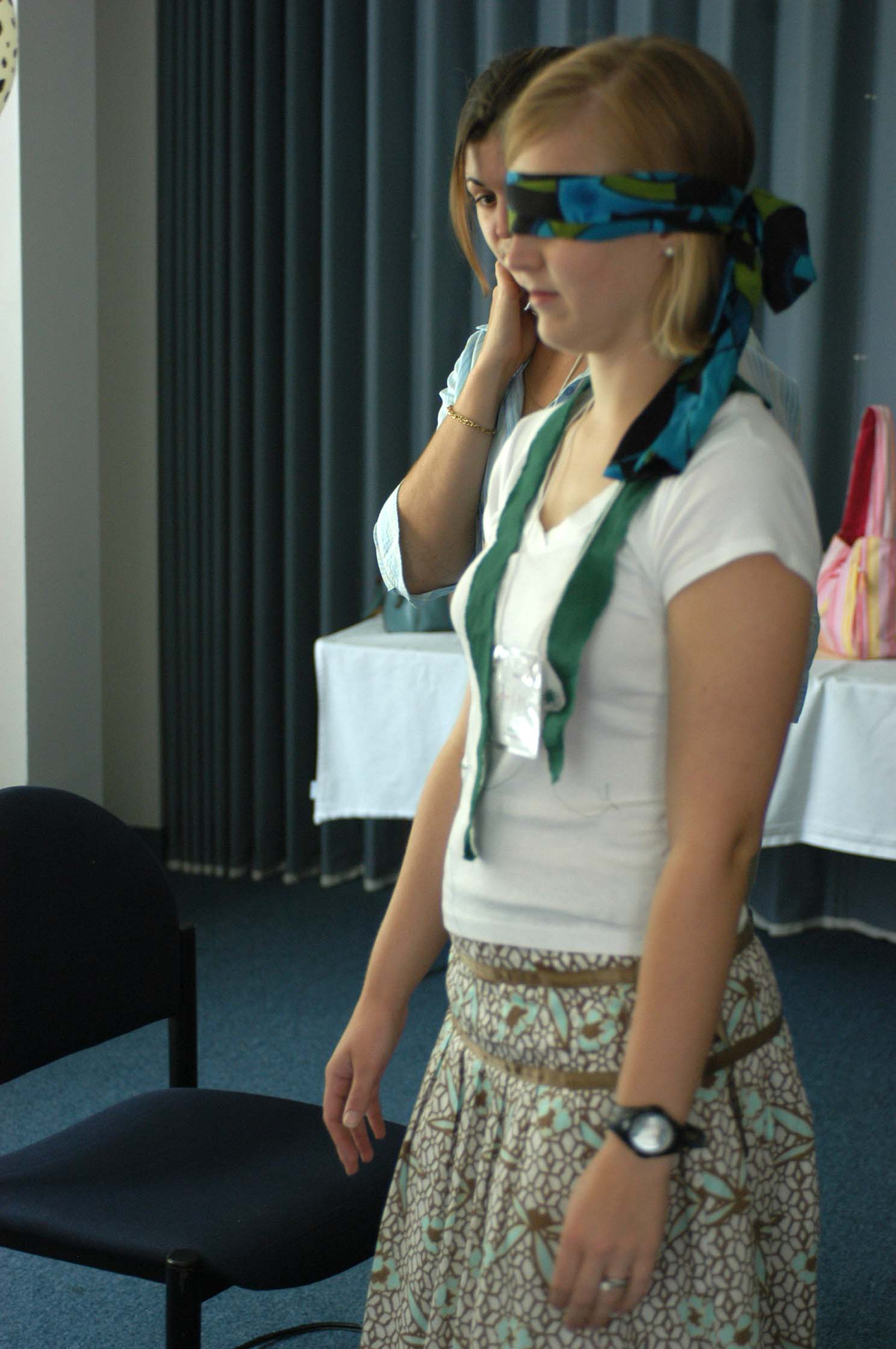
A blindfolded woman

Blindfolds can be used in various applications:

- As a sleep mask: They block out light when sleeping, especially during air travel, or for those who sleep during the day, given that shutting out light allows the user to achieve a deeper level of sleep. They can also provide relief from claustrophobia for magnetic resonance imaging (MRI) patients.
- In children's games, such as Pin the Tail on the Donkey and when hitting a piñata.
- During both martial arts and weight lifting, to encourage reliance on other senses, such as touch or hearing.
- As an added challenge in activities such as chess and speedcubing, forcing participants to rely purely on their memory.
- As a sensory deprivation tool in meditation, to focus attention on oneself rather than outside imagery.
- As a way to keep a kidnapping victim, hostage, prisoner, etc., from being able to identify locations or people.
- To cover the eyes of a blind person for health or cosmetic reasons. (Since the invention of sunglasses, this is much less common.)
- As a prop in magic tricks. One common trick involves a blindfolded performer doing a task that requires vision, such as driving.
- As an aid to simulate blindness during training of Orientation and Mobility Specialists, so that they develop empathetic understanding of blindness and learn how to rely on their other senses to get to know the environment and move around freely and independently.
- During executions, to relax and calm the accused, as they will be unable to see their execution and thus less likely to panic.
- Sexual activity may include blindfolding. They can be constructed with feathers and sold with handcuffs in novelty "bondage kits". Many impromptu items already found in the bedroom lend themselves to such use without preparation or prior purchase of specialized equipment. Blindfolds may be improvised from garments such as scarves, dupattas, or bandanas. Lightweight cotton fabrics are commonly used due to breathability and comfort.
- Mutual anonymity is also a possible side effect, as a blindfold usually covers the same area as a Domino mask. This can be desirable for erotic photography or more public displays. This can effectively range from rows of ropes during a bondage session, over the aforementioned scarves being spread out over the whole face, to whole rubber zentai suits.

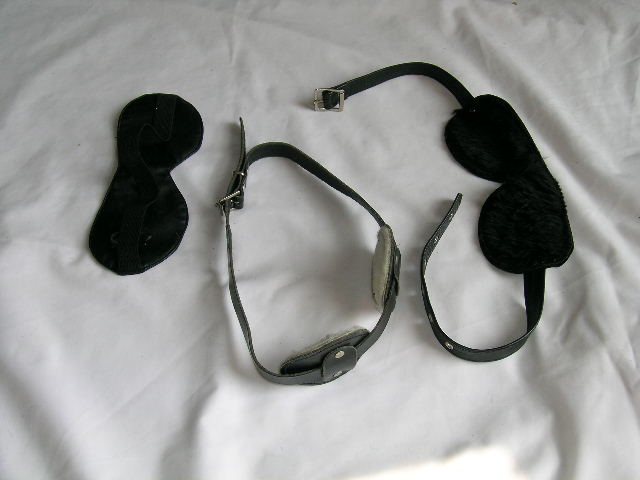
A collection of BDSM blindfolds

Use of a blindfold is said to enhance the remaining senses of the wearer, focusing attention on sound, smells and physical contact. This increased awareness is said to allow for greater excitement and anticipation by eliminating visual cues, as one cannot see what to expect. It also requires trust of the submissive, with all the emotional ramifications that entails.

== Symbolism ==
The blindfold has been a powerful symbol in divination and mythology since the 15th century.

In law, it is seen being worn by Lady Justice, to represent objectivity and impartiality.

The blindfold as a symbol is also a common theme in tarot and other divination methods. It can represent themes of the victim, resistance to clarity, denial, or limited views. It is often accompanied by underlying themes of integrity and truth at a cost. Likewise, the icon of the blindfold can symbolize the dichotomy of the conscious and the unconscious, as wearing a blindfold represents a stasis or a lesser state of consciousness, whereas taking off one's blindfold represents a form of awakening or rebirth. It also represents connection to feeling over senses, emphasizing the importance of emotion over perception.

== See also ==
- Eyepatch
- Blinders (blinkers): for horses
