= Mordellaria fascifera =

Scientific classification
- Kingdom: Animalia
- Phylum: Arthropoda
- Class: Insecta
- Order: Coleoptera
- Suborder: Polyphaga
- Infraorder: Cucujiformia
- Family: Mordellidae
- Subfamily: Mordellinae
- Tribe: Mordellini
- Genus: Mordellaria
- Species: M. fascifera

Binomial name
- Mordellaria fascifera (LeConte, 1878)

Synonyms
- Tomoxia fascifera (LeConte, 1878); Mordella fascifera LeConte, 1878

Species of beetles

Mordellaria fascifera is a species of tumbling flower beetle in the family Mordellidae, found in North America.
