= Mordellaria latipalpis =

Scientific classification
- Domain: Eukaryota
- Kingdom: Animalia
- Phylum: Arthropoda
- Class: Insecta
- Order: Coleoptera
- Suborder: Polyphaga
- Infraorder: Cucujiformia
- Family: Mordellidae
- Genus: Mordellaria
- Species: M. latipalpis

Binomial name
- Mordellaria latipalpis (Ray, 1946)

Synonyms
- Tomoxia latipalpis Ray, 1946

Species of beetles

Mordellaria latipalpis is a species of tumbling flower beetle in the family Mordellidae.
