= Mordellaria latior =

Scientific classification
- Domain: Eukaryota
- Kingdom: Animalia
- Phylum: Arthropoda
- Class: Insecta
- Order: Coleoptera
- Suborder: Polyphaga
- Infraorder: Cucujiformia
- Family: Mordellidae
- Genus: Mordellaria
- Species: M. latior

Binomial name
- Mordellaria latior Nomura, 1967

Species of beetle

Mordellaria latior is a species of beetle in family Mordellidae. It is found in temperate Asia.
