= Hyottoko =

Comical Japanese character with a skewed mask

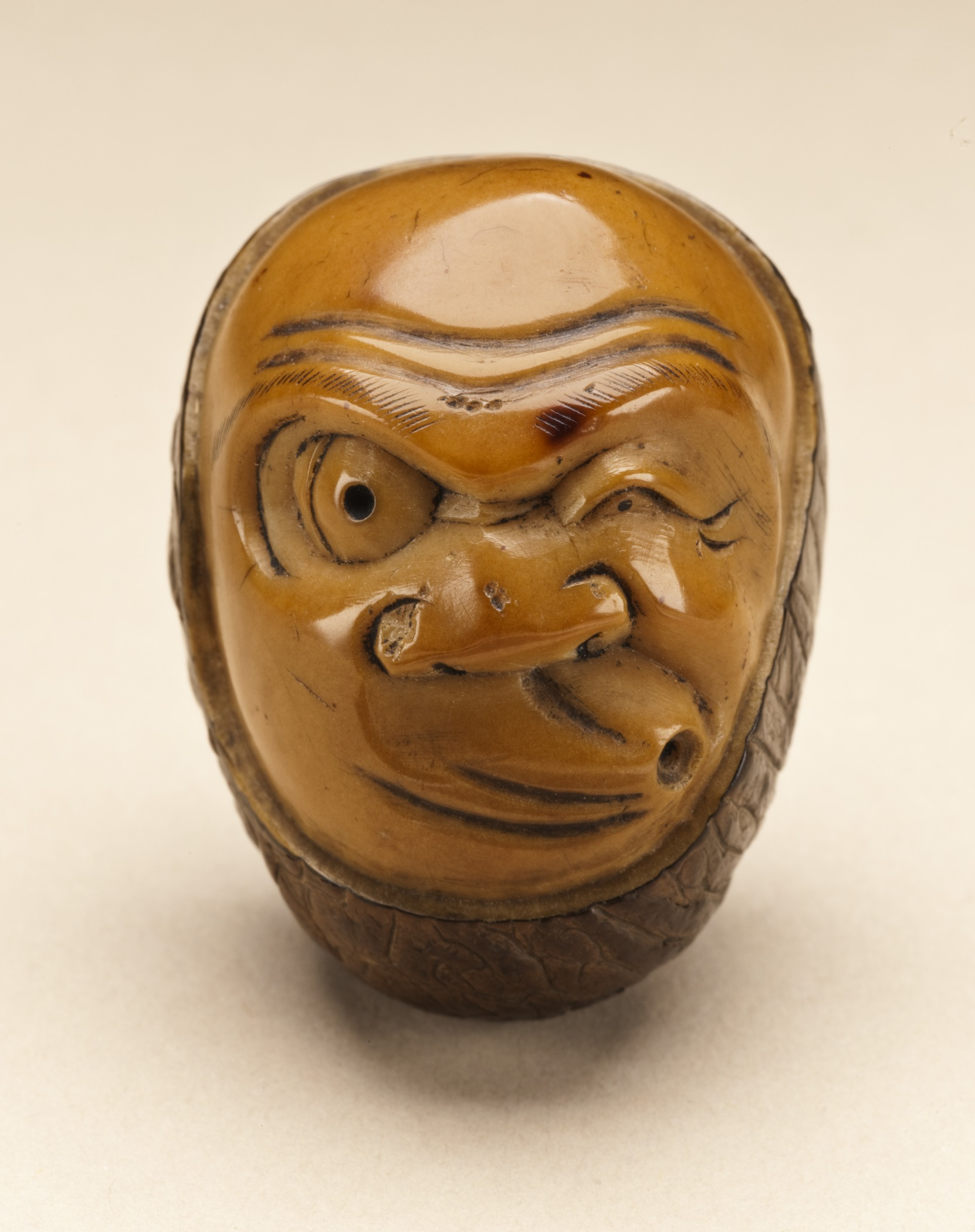
A 19th century carved nut, depicting the mask of Hyottoko

Hyottoko (火男) is a comical Japanese character, portrayed through the use of a mask. His mouth is puckered and skewed to one side. Some masks have different eye sizes between the left and right eyes. He is often wearing a scarf around his head (usually white with blue dots). There is a similar character for women called Okame (阿亀) or Otafuku (阿多福).

The origin of the name comes from "fire" (火, hi) and "man" (男, otoko); this could be because the character is blowing fire with a bamboo pipe, hence the shape of the mouth. Local dialects transformed it into Hyottoko (ひょっとこ), palatalizing hio to hyo and geminating the /t/.

== History ==
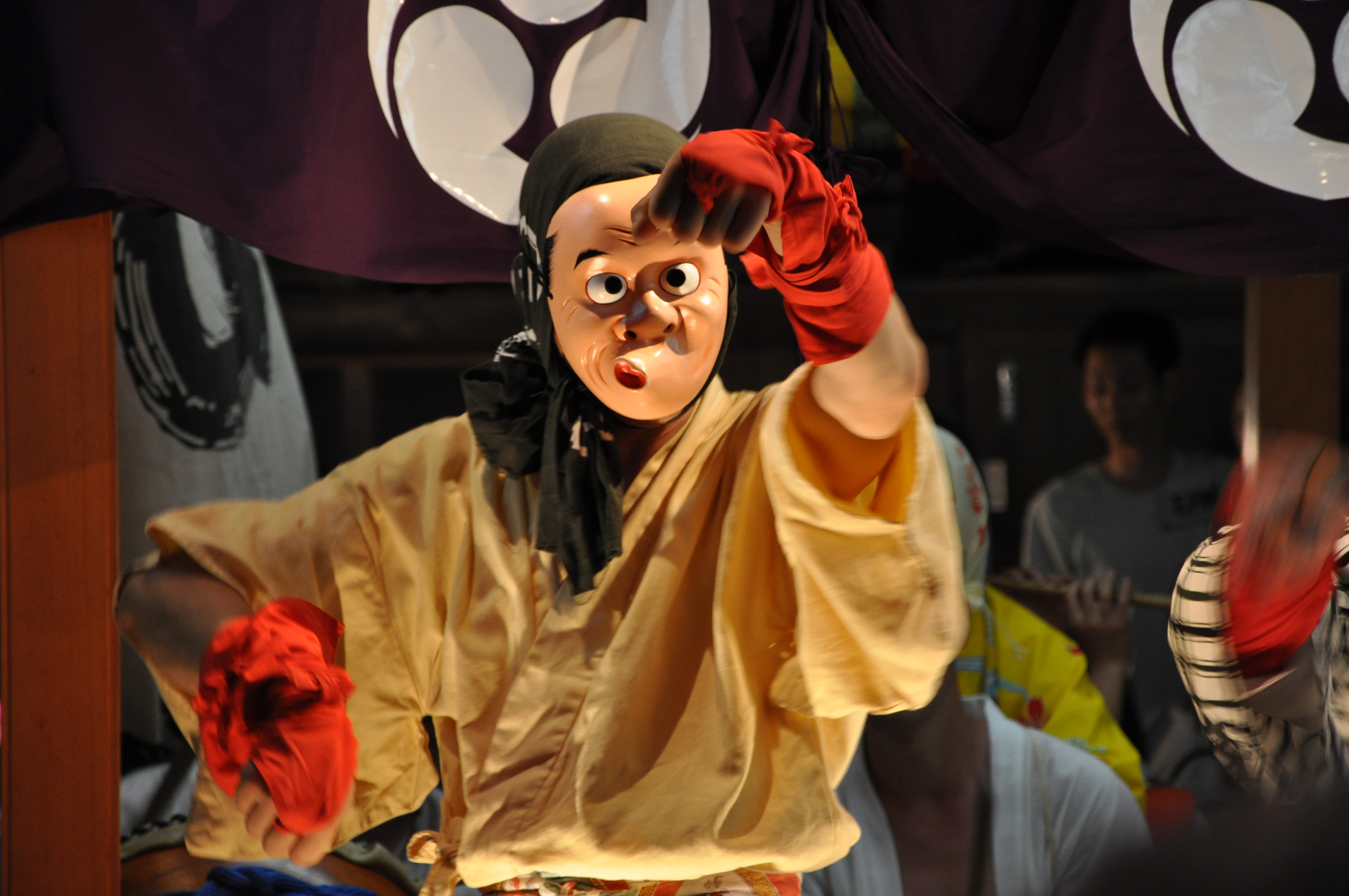
A performer in a Hyottoko mask.

Hyottoko seems to have been a legendary character in Japan in the past, and is now a stock character.

In Iwate Prefecture, there is a myth about the origin of Hyottoko. In the story, there was a boy with a bizarre face who could create gold out of his belly button, so when someone died in a house, you would put the mask of this boy at the top of the fireplace to bring good fortune to the house. The name of the boy was Hyoutokusu (ヒョウトクス). This is considered one of the possible names that lend plausibility to the origin of Hyottoko.

In some parts of north eastern Japan, Hyottoko is regarded as the god of fire. There is a well known folk story in the form of music, izumoyasugibushi (出雲安来節), where a fisherman dances with a bamboo basket, having the same visual expression as the mask of Hyottoko. During this dance, a person puts five yen coins on their nose. This is similar to myth of Iwate prefecture. Izumo is the old name of Iwate prefecture and Izumo was famous for its iron industry. The dance was part of a dedication for fire and steel.

=== Television episode ===
The television show Folktales from Japan (まんが日本昔ばなし, Nihon Mukashi Banashi) suggests a tale in which an old man is gathering sticks in a forest, then responds to a mysterious voice calling for firewood from a hole in a pile of leaves. Upon satisfying the requests of the unknown figure with his own gathered sticks, the old man is drawn into a subterranean realm ruled by a fire god. The fire god rewards the man with a sack of "treasure", which the man carries back to his house.

The old man's so-called "shifty" wife impatiently unties the bundle and a malformed baby with a swollen belly button, which it constantly picks at, is revealed. The wife is frustrated with this "treasure" and harbours a dislike for the baby, but the old man grows attached to it and nurtures it.

After a year the baby's belly button is swollen to a great degree. Speculatively tapping the belly button with his pipe, the old man finds that a gold piece can be caused to pop out of the baby's belly button when it is disturbed, allowing for the construction of a large new house. The wife attempts to take advantage of this source of wealth while the husband is away by attacking the baby with an oversized pipe, leading to the death of the baby.

Distraught, the old man carves a wooden mask of the baby, the eponymous Hyottoko, and hangs it within sight of the realm that it came from, in the hopes that it might one day return.

=== Traditional dance ===
Hyottoko also appears in traditional dance dengaku (田楽). He plays the role of a clown. Dancers wearing Hyottoko masks also appear in some Japanese local festivals. One of the most famous Hyottoko dances takes place in Miyazaki Prefecture – Hyuga Hyottoko Natsumatsuri (日向ひょっとこ夏祭り). The Hyotokko dance is believed to originate in the Edo period.

== Otafuku ==
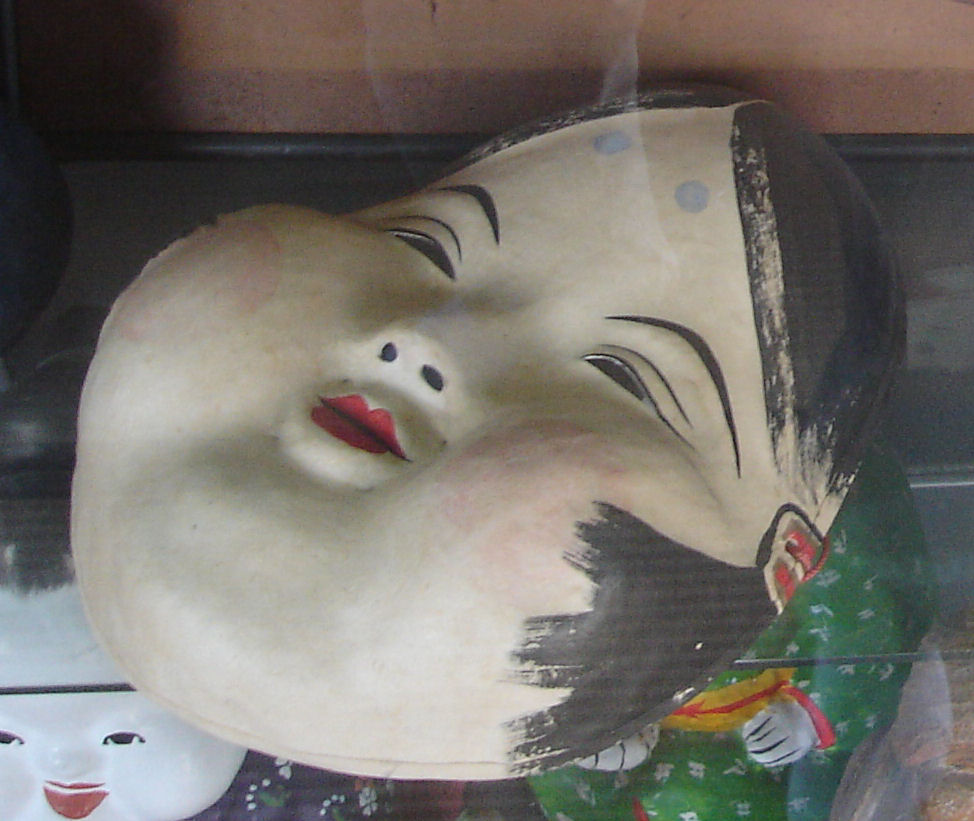
Okame mask.

Otafuku (阿多福), also known as Ofuku (おふく) and Okame (阿亀), is a female character associated to Hyottoko, usually portrayed as a woman ugly and rotund but good-natured and humorous. Its origin might lie in a famous Uzume miko from the Muromachi period who was nicknamed Kamejo ("Turtle Woman") for resembling a traditional turtle mask or okame. She would have received also the nickname of otafuku ("much good fortune") for her goodness and virtue. In posterior centuries, she appears in theatre and literature as Hyottoko's wife.

Over time, the character got associated to ribald humor, and by the time of Zen master Hakuin Ekaku she was identified as a prostitute, ugly but captivating at the same time. This portrayal came probably from the popular stereotype of the meshimori onna, also known as okame, and was used in Zen poetry to reflect the doctrine of nondualism.
