= Mordellaria hananoi =

Scientific classification
- Kingdom: Animalia
- Phylum: Arthropoda
- Class: Insecta
- Order: Coleoptera
- Suborder: Polyphaga
- Infraorder: Cucujiformia
- Family: Mordellidae
- Subfamily: Mordellinae
- Tribe: Mordellini
- Genus: Mordellaria
- Species: M. hananoi

Binomial name
- Mordellaria hananoi (Nakane & Nomura, 1950)

Synonyms
- Mordella hananoi Nakane & Nomura, 1950

Species of beetles

Mordellaria hananoi is a species of tumbling flower beetle in the family Mordellidae. It is found in temperate Asia.
