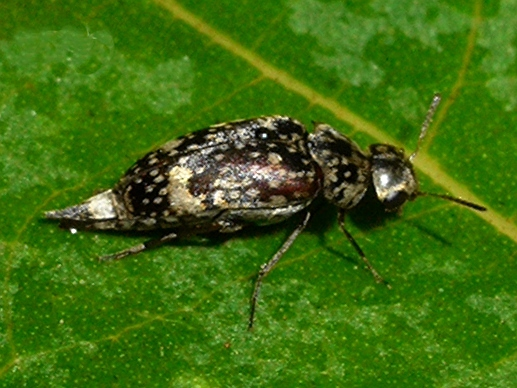
- Mordellaria serval, Wisconsin

Scientific classification
- Kingdom: Animalia
- Phylum: Arthropoda
- Class: Insecta
- Order: Coleoptera
- Suborder: Polyphaga
- Infraorder: Cucujiformia
- Family: Mordellidae
- Subfamily: Mordellinae
- Tribe: Mordellini
- Genus: Mordellaria; Ermisch 1950

Type species
- Mordella scripta Fairmaire & Germain, 1863

= Mordellaria =

Genus of beetles

Mordellaria is a genus of tumbling flower beetles in the family Mordellidae. There are at least 10 described species in Mordellaria.

== Species ==
These 10 species belong to the genus Mordellaria:

- Mordellaria aurofasciata (Comolli, 1837) (Europe)
- Mordellaria borealis (LeConte, 1862) (North America)
- Mordellaria fascifera (LeConte, 1878)
- Mordellaria hananoi (Nakane & Nomura, 1950) (temperate Asia)
- Mordellaria kanoi Kono, 1932 (temperate Asia)
- Mordellaria latior Nomura, 1967 (temperate Asia)
- Mordellaria latipalpis (Ray, 1946)
- Mordellaria serval (Say, 1835) (North America)
- Mordellaria undulata (Melsheimer, 1845) (North America)
- † Mordellaria friedrichi Perkovsky & Odnosum, 2013
