= Shinmachi-shuku =

Coordinates: 36.2766°N 139.1086°E

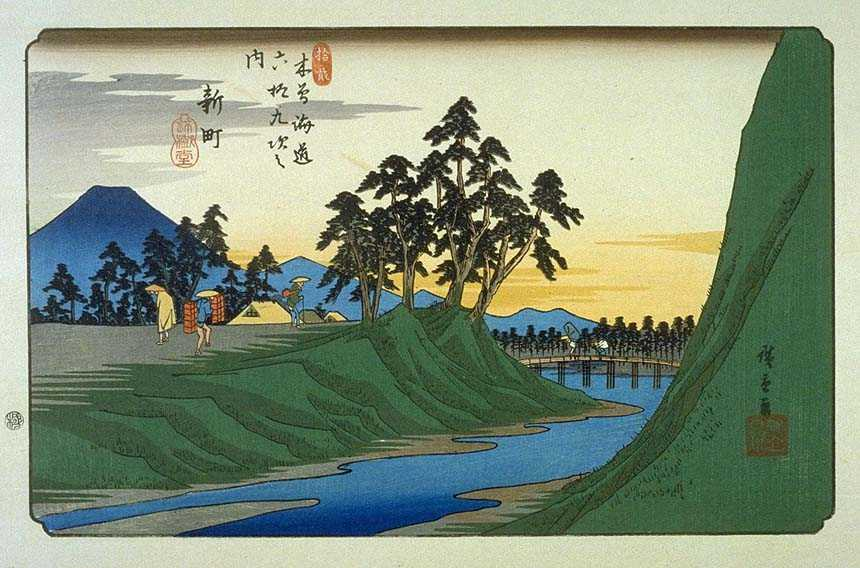
Hiroshige's print of Shinmachi-shuku, part of The Sixty-nine Stations of the Kiso Kaidō series

Shinmachi-shuku (新町宿, Shinmachi-shuku) was the eleventh of the sixty-nine stations of the Nakasendō. It is located in the present-day city of Takasaki, Gunma Prefecture, Japan.

== History ==
Though Shinmachi-shuku is the eleventh post station on the Nakasendō, it was the last station to be developed.

== Neighboring post towns ==
Nakasendō
Honjō-shuku - Shinmanchi-shuku - Kuragano-shuku
