= Mordellaria borealis =

Scientific classification
- Domain: Eukaryota
- Kingdom: Animalia
- Phylum: Arthropoda
- Class: Insecta
- Order: Coleoptera
- Suborder: Polyphaga
- Infraorder: Cucujiformia
- Family: Mordellidae
- Genus: Mordellaria
- Species: M. borealis

Binomial name
- Mordellaria borealis (LeConte, 1862)

Species of beetle

Mordellaria borealis is a species of tumbling flower beetle in the family Mordellidae. It is found in North America.
