= Serval (disambiguation) =

The serval is a type of feline.

Serval may also refer to:

- Armstrong Siddeley Serval, aircraft engine
- LIV (SO) Serval, German military vehicle
- VBMR-L Serval, French military vehicle
- La Chapelle-en-Serval, commune in northern France
- Mordellaria serval – Species of beetle
- Operation Serval, French operation in Mali
- Pachydactylus serval – Species of lizard
- Serval, Aisne, commune in northern France
- Serval project, a project providing infrastructure for direct connections between cellular phones
- Serval, a playable character in Honkai: Star Rail
