= Pin the tail on the donkey =

Traditional children's game

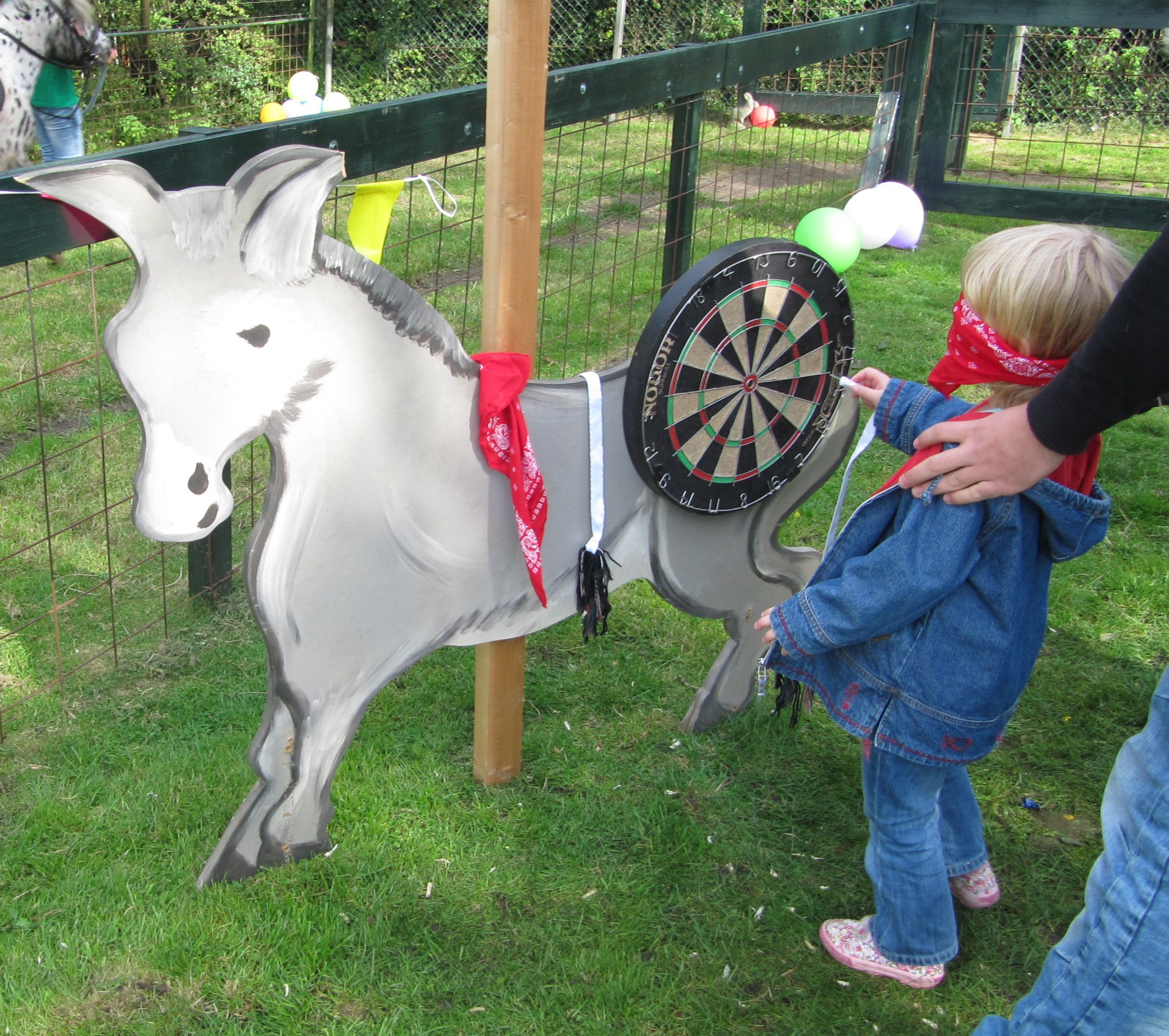
Child playing a version of pin the tail on the donkey where the tail is attached to a dart, to be pushed into a dart board.

Pin the tail on the donkey is a game played by groups of children. The earliest known version, listed in a catalog of American games compiled by the American Game Collectors Association in 1998, is dated 1899, and attributed to Kate Hunt.

It is common at birthday parties and other gatherings. A picture of a donkey with a missing tail is tacked to a wall within easy reach of children. One at a time, each child is blindfolded and handed a paper "tail" with a push pin or thumbtack poked through it. The blindfolded child is then spun around until disoriented. The child gropes around and tries to pin the tail on the donkey. The player who pins their tail closest to the target, the donkey's rear, wins. The game, a group activity, is generally not competitive; "winning" is only of marginal importance. It is often seen as more entertaining, seeing the children stumble around and try to put their tail at the right place.

The game is also used in child development research.

The game can also be played by teenagers and adults, especially if the "donkey" is replaced with depictions of something or someone else. As a drinking game, the person with the worst tail pinning is awarded one shot of a selected alcohol, to be determined by house rules or the loser in a friendly environment.

== See also ==
- Eeyore, a character who loses his tail and has to have it pinned back on.
- Fukuwarai, a similar Japanese game
- Piñata
