= Mordellaria aurofasciata =

Scientific classification
- Domain: Eukaryota
- Kingdom: Animalia
- Phylum: Arthropoda
- Class: Insecta
- Order: Coleoptera
- Suborder: Polyphaga
- Infraorder: Cucujiformia
- Family: Mordellidae
- Subfamily: Mordellinae
- Tribe: Mordellini
- Genus: Mordellaria
- Species: M. aurofasciata

Binomial name
- Mordellaria aurofasciata (Comolli, 1837)

Synonyms
- Mordella aurofasciata Comolli, 1837; Mordella sacheri Frivaldsky, 1865; Mordella vittata Gemminger, 1851

Species of beetles

Mordellaria aurofasciata is a species of tumbling flower beetle in the family Mordellidae. It is found in Europe.
