= Fukuwarai =

Japanese children's game

Example components for a fukuwarai game: a blank face and a set of facial features

Fukuwarai (福笑い) is a Japanese children's game, popular during New Year's celebrations. Players are led to a table which has a paper drawing of a human face with no features depicted, and cutouts of several facial features (such as the eyes, eyebrows, nose and mouth). While blindfolded, the players attempt to place the features onto the face in the correct positions.

Correct placement tends to be a stroke of luck and incorrect placement an amusing matter, perhaps explaining the name and its translation, "lucky laugh".

The game is thought to date from the late Edo period. It commonly used an okame-style face of a woman with large cheeks, or a hyottoko, a man with a silly expression and his mouth sticking out. Both faces are thought to be lucky, and playing with them is seen as a good way to welcome in the New Year.

The game is similar to the Western game pin the tail on the donkey, except for being performed on a table.
