= Kamizumo =

Kamizumo (紙相撲; "paper wrestling") is a Japanese pastime or performance which consists of a sumo match between puppets or other inanimate surrogates. The two terms, although homonyms in English, are written with different kanji, and refer to two different but related practices.

Originally, kamizumo (神相撲) was practiced as a Shinto ritual, part of the shrine dedication ceremony at the Hachiman shrine in Yoshitomi. Every four years, performers use articulated wooden dolls, manipulated from below by puppeteers known as odoriko to enact a sumo bout at the shrine. Up to twelve puppets are used, representing the kami of the East and West. The outcome is prearranged; in the second round, the West triumphs thanks to the appearance of the kami Sumiyoshi.

More recently, kamizumo (紙相撲) has developed into a children's game, in which two paper or cardboard effigies of sumo wrestlers are placed facing each other and manipulated (either indirectly by vibration of the playing surface or with a stick) until one either falls or is moved out of the playing area.
