= Meshimori onna =

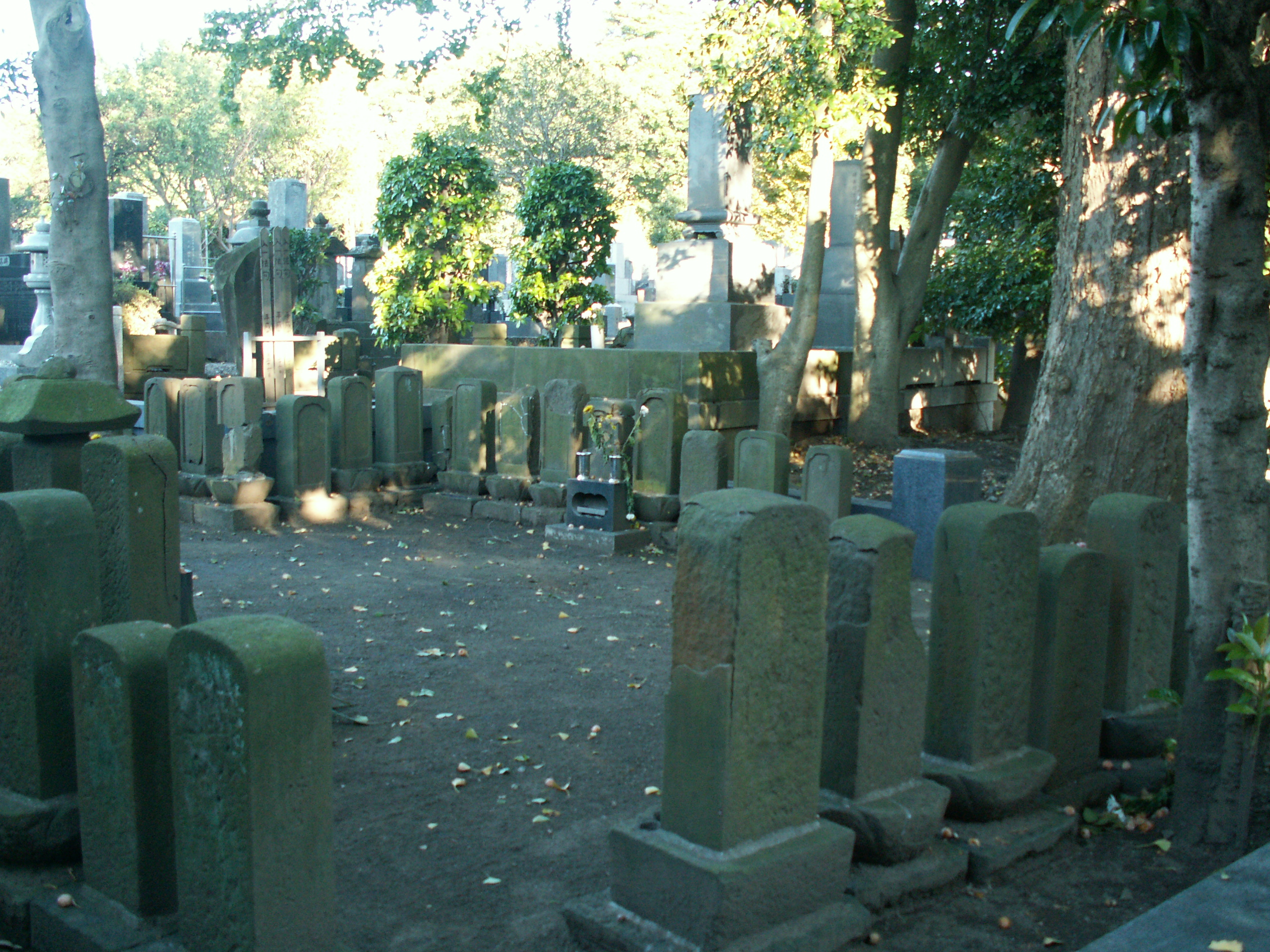
The graves of meshimori onna in the precinct of Eishō-ji temple in Fujisawa city. They were built by the owner of Hotel Komatsuya, Edo era.

Meshimori onna (飯盛女) or meshiuri onna (飯売女), literally "meal-serving woman", is the Japanese term for the women who were hired by hatago inns at the shukuba (post stations) along kaidō routes in Japan during the Edo era. They were originally maidservants hired by the inns, although as traffic along the kaidō grew and competition between the inns increased, they were often engaged in prostitution.

Many inns had prostitutes in order to attract a larger number of travellers. In 1718, the Tokugawa shogunate issued a law limiting the number of meshimori onna to two per inn, giving the inns tacit permission to employ a limited number of prostitutes.

== See also ==
- Nakai (Japanese vocation)
