= Keisai Eisen =

Japanese ukiyo-e artist

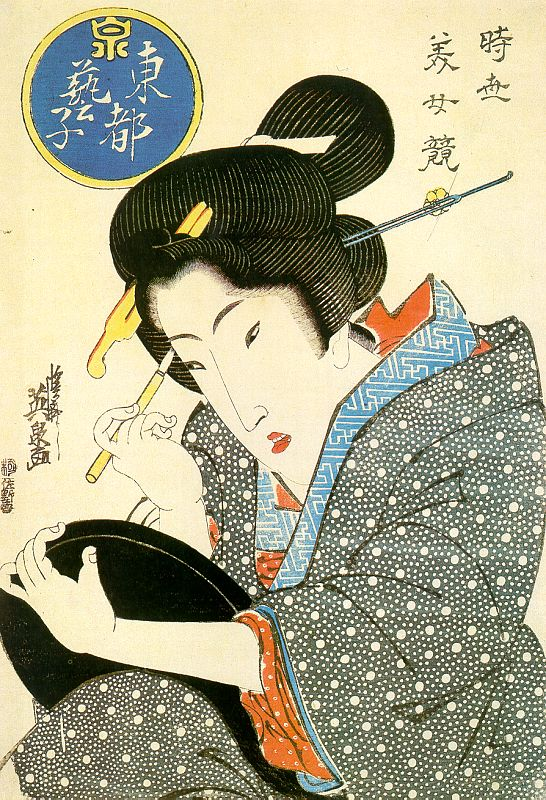
An example of a bijin picture by Eisen (from the series 'Toto geiko') - this was the type of picture for which he has become best known.

Keisai Eisen (渓斎 英泉, 1790–1848) was a Japanese ukiyo-e artist who specialised in bijin-ga (pictures of beautiful women). His best works, including his ōkubi-e ("large head pictures"), are considered to be masterpieces of the "decadent" Bunsei Era (1818–1830). He was also known as Ikeda Eisen, and wrote under the name of Ippitsuan.

== Biography ==
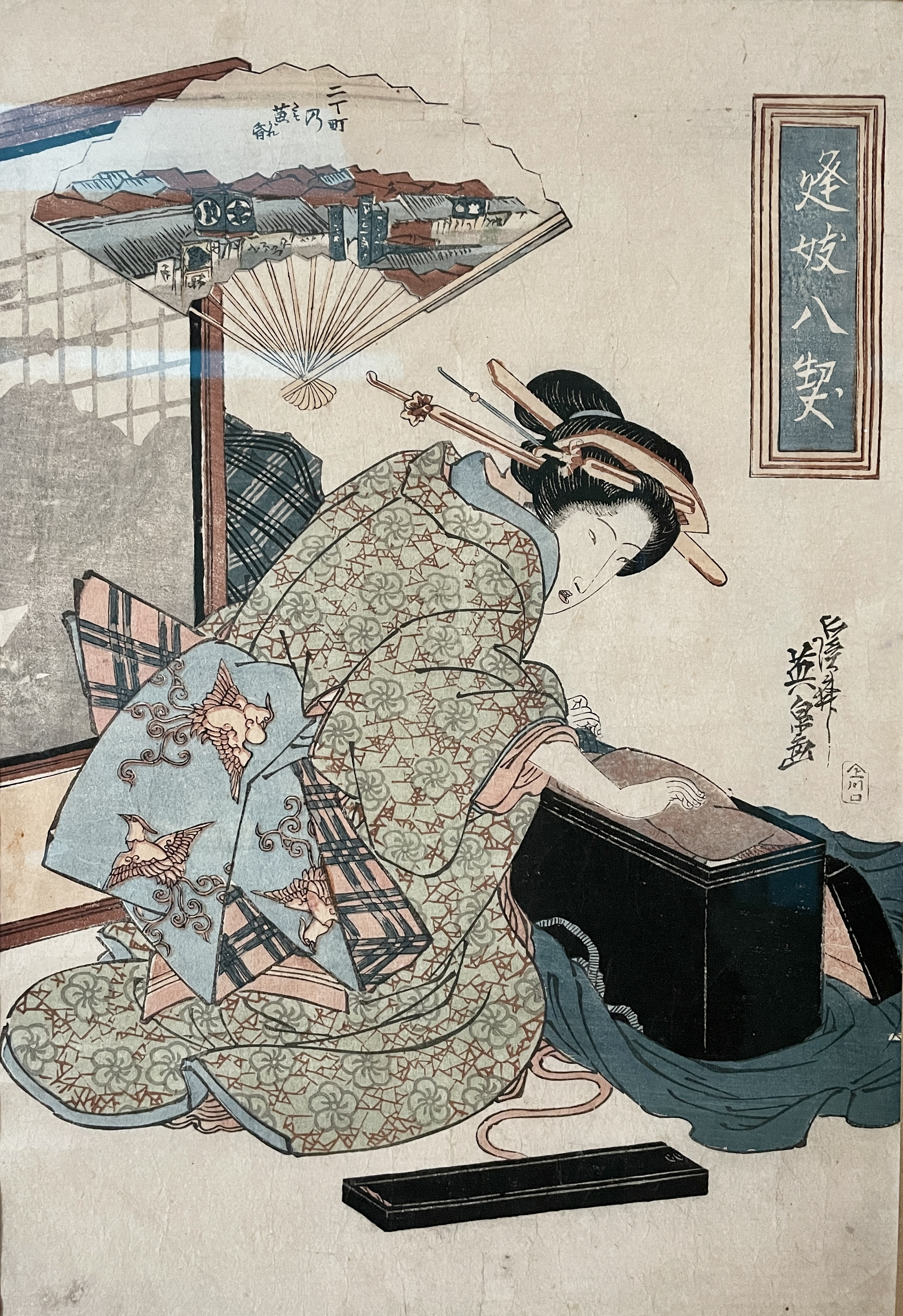
Eisen, woodblock print on paper, 1830 (private collection)

Eisen was born in Edo into the Ikeda family, the son of a noted calligrapher. His father, the samurai Ikeda Masahei Shigeharu, was a painter of the Kanō school as well as a talented calligrapher; Eisen's own birth name was Ikeda Yoshinobu, with the common name Zenjirō, and over his career he used numerous gō including Kokushunrō, Koizumi, Ippitsuan Kakō, Fusen Ichiin, Mumei'an and Insai Hakusui. He was apprenticed to Kanō Hakkeisai, from whom he took the name Keisai, and after the death of his father he studied under Kikukawa Eizan. His initial works reflected the influence of his mentor, but he soon developed his own style.

He produced a number of surimono (prints that were privately issued), erotic prints, and landscapes, including The Sixty-nine Stations of the Kiso Kaidō. Eisen designed the series' first eleven prints, working in a Kanō-influenced style, before Hiroshige took over its completion shortly before 1843; as there is no evidence that either artist actually travelled the Kiso Kaidō route, both are thought to have based their designs on printed travel guides.

Art historians have also noted the stylistic influence of Hokusai and of Yanagawa Shigenobu I on the young Eisen. Eisen is most renowned for his bijin-ga (pictures of beautiful women) which portrayed the subjects as more worldly than those depicted by earlier artists, replacing their grace and elegance with a less studied sensuality. He produced many portraits and full-length studies depicting the fashions of the time.

In addition to producing a prolific number of prints, he was a writer, producing biographies of the Forty-seven Ronin and several books, including a continuation of the Ukiyo-e Ruiko (History of Prints of the Floating World), a book which documented the lives of the ukiyo-e artists. His supplement is known as "Notes of a Nameless Old Man." He describes himself as a dissolute hard-drinker and claims to have been the owner of a brothel in Nezu in the 1830s which had burned down.

== Gallery ==
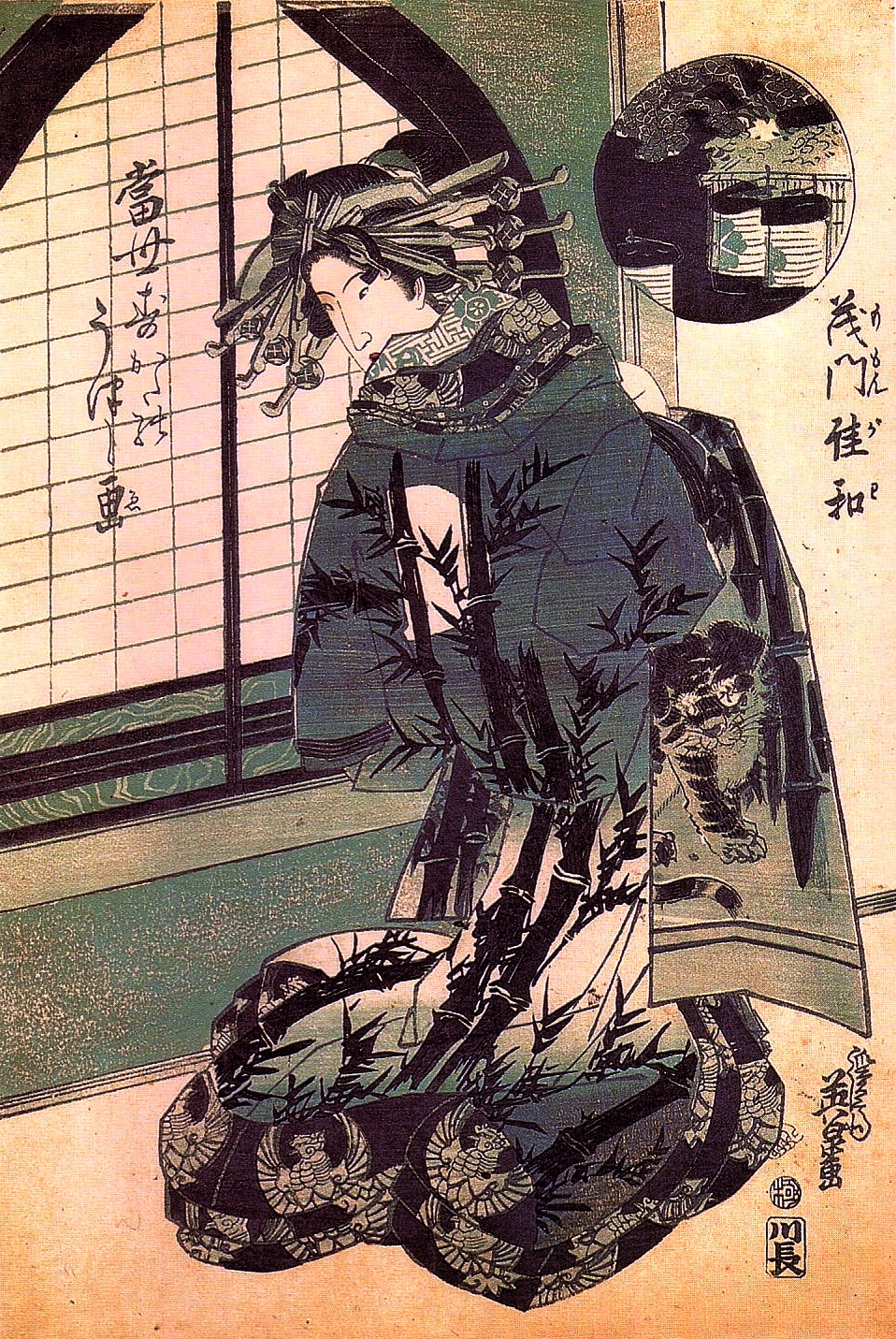
Courtesan, c. 1808

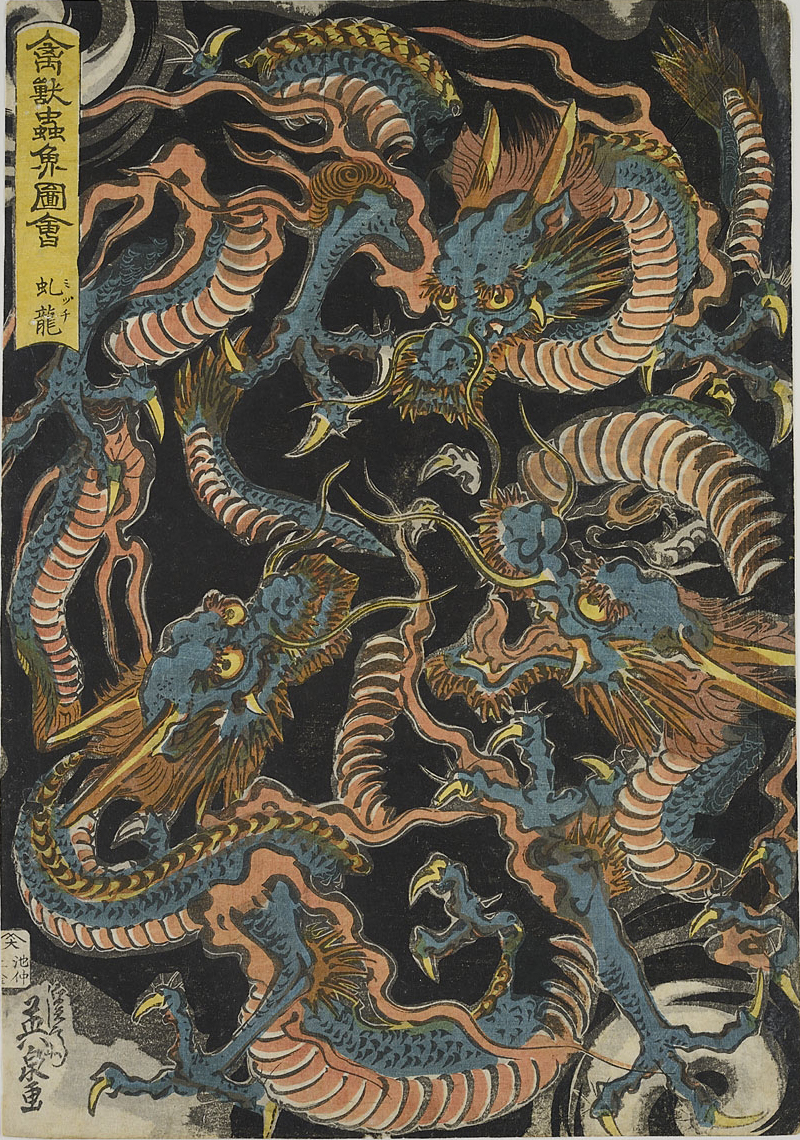
Water dragon, c. 1830–48

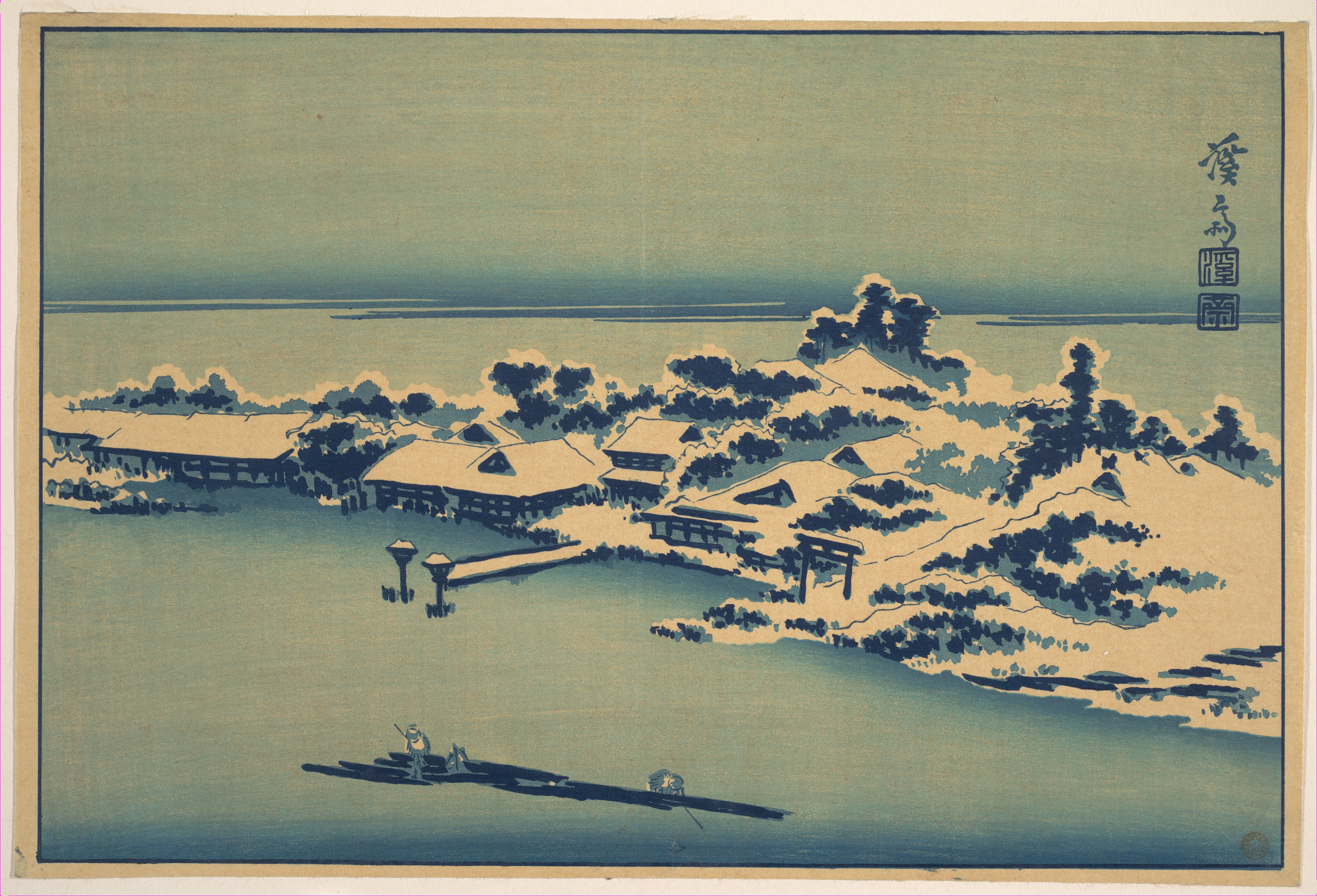
Winter landscape

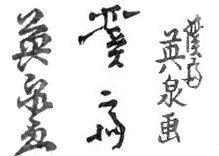
Signatures of Keisai Eisen reading from left to right: "Eisen ga" (英泉 画), "Keisai" (渓斎), and "Keisai Eisen ga" (渓斎 英泉 画)

== Further Readings ==
- Dan McKee. "Keisai Eisen".
- John Fiorillo (1999). "Keisai Eisen". Archived from the original on 31 January 2008.
- Rasch, Carsten: Keisai Eisen, Berlin 2015.
