= Nojiri =

Nojiri may refer to:

- Nojiri, Miyazaki, a former Japanese town in Miyazaki Prefecture, now merged into Kobayashi
- Lake Nojiri, body of water near the town of Shinano, Japan
- 3008 Nojiri, a main-belt asteroid
- Nojiri-juku (Nakasendō), historical rest point along the former Japanese trade route of Nakasendō
- Higashi-Nojiri Station, train station in Tonami, Japan
- Kami-Nojiri Station, train station in Nishiaizu, Japan
- Nishi-Nojiri Station, train station in Inabe, Japan
- Nojiri Station, train station on the Chūō Main Line of Japan

== People with the surname ==
- Azusa Nojiri (born 1982), Japanese marathon runner
- Hōei Nojiri (1885–1977), Japanese essayist and astronomer
- Hōsuke Nojiri (born 1961), Japanese science fiction writer
- Shinta Nojiri (born 1971), Japanese video game designer
- Shin'ichi Nojiri, Japanese physicist and cosmologist

== See also ==
- Nojiri-juku (disambiguation)
