= Kisoji =

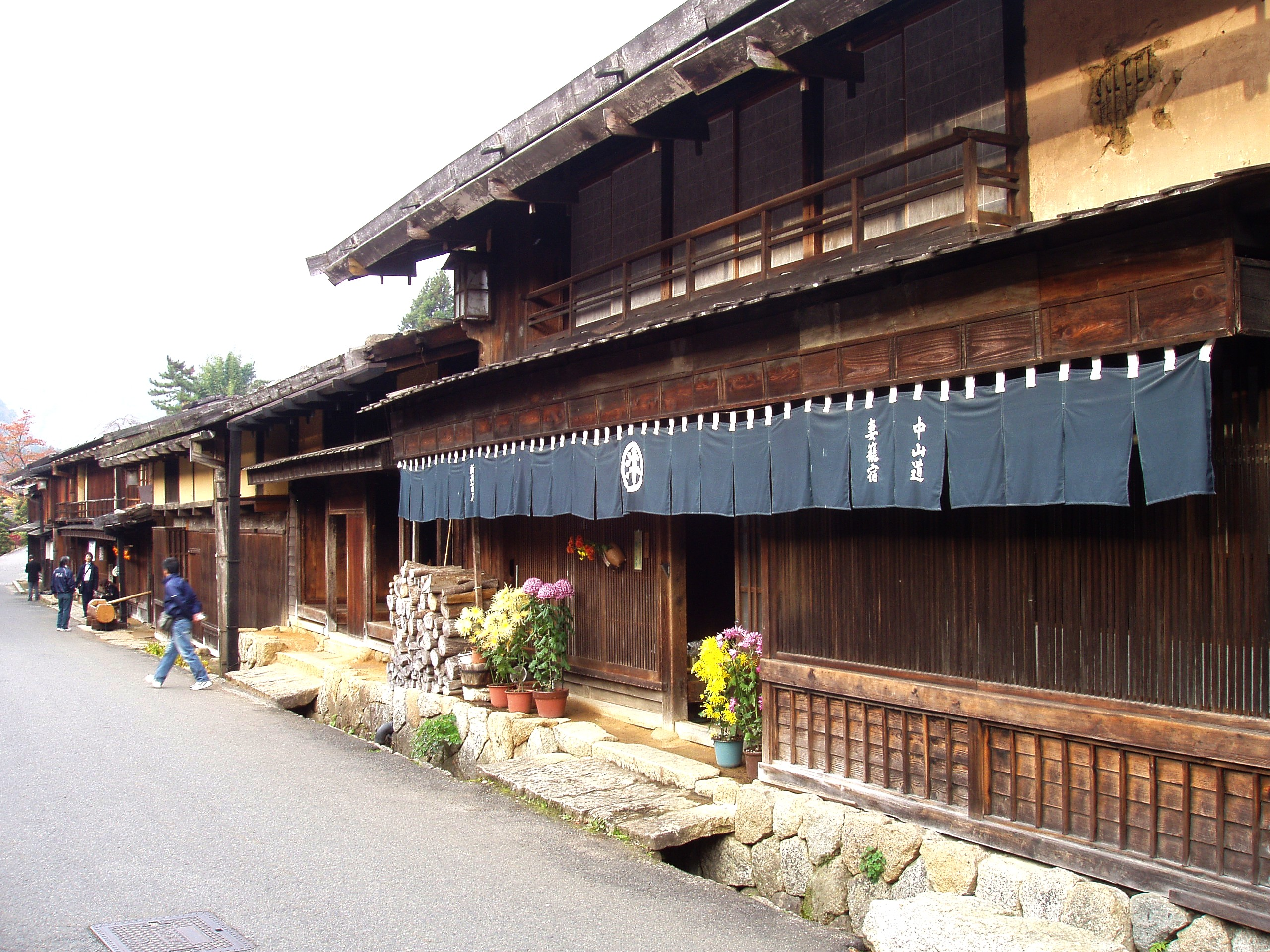
Typical building facades in Tsumago-juku.

The Kisoji (木曽路, Kisoji) was an old trade route in the Kiso Valley that stretched from Niekawa-juku in Nagano Prefecture to Magome-juku in Gifu Prefecture. There were eleven resting spots along the route, all of which became part of the Nakasendō when it was established. There is an article dating from 713 in the Shoku Nihongi that records the route’s characters as 吉蘇路.

There are two stone markers that indicate the end points of the Kisoji. One is located between Motoyama-juku and Niekawa-juku and states "From here south: Kisoji" (是より南 木曽路 Kore yori minami, Kisoji). The other marker is located between Magome-juku and Ochiai-juku and states, "From here north: Kisoji" (是より北 木曽路 Kore yori kita, Kisoji).

Additionally, the early 20th-century author, Shimazaki Tōson, wrote about the effects of the Meiji Restoration on the Kiso Valley in his novel, Before the Dawn. He grew up in Magome-juku, hence his featuring the area in his novels.

After the Meiji period, the Chūō Main Line and Route 19 were established, which roughly follow the Kisoji's path.

== Stations of the Kisoji ==
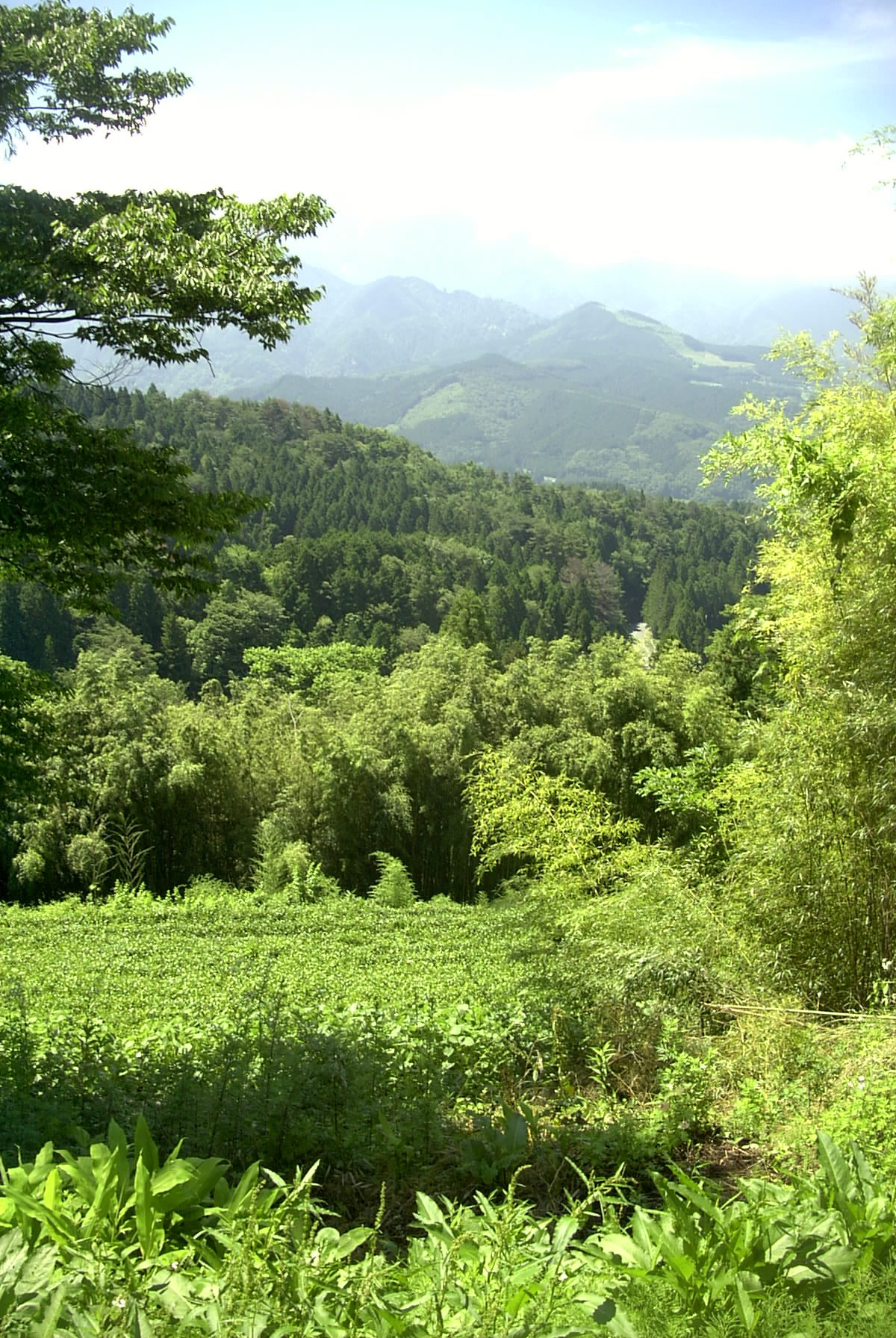
The view from the top of the hill in Magome-juku, Japan.

Nagano Prefecture

1. Niekawa-juku (Shiojiri)
2. Narai-juku (Shiojiri)
3. Yabuhara-juku (Kiso (village), Kiso District)
4. Miyanokoshi-juku (Kiso (town), Kiso District)
5. Fukushima-juku (Kiso (town), Kiso District)
6. Agematsu-juku (Agematsu, Kiso District)
7. Suhara-juku (Ōkuwa, Kiso District)
8. Nojiri-juku (Ōkuwa, Kiso District)
9. Midono-juku (Nagiso, Kiso District)
10. Tsumago-juku (Nagiso, Kiso District)

Gifu Prefecture

11. Magome-juku (Nakatsugawa)

== See also ==
- Edo Five Routes
  - Tōkaidō (or 53 Stations of the Tōkaidō)
  - Nakasendō (or 69 Stations of the Nakasendō)
  - Kōshū Kaidō
  - Ōshū Kaidō
  - Nikkō Kaidō
- Other Routes
  - Hokkoku Kaidō
  - Mikuni Kaidō
