= Tsumago-juku =

Town in Japan

Coordinates: 35.5753°N 137.5951°E

Tsumago-juku

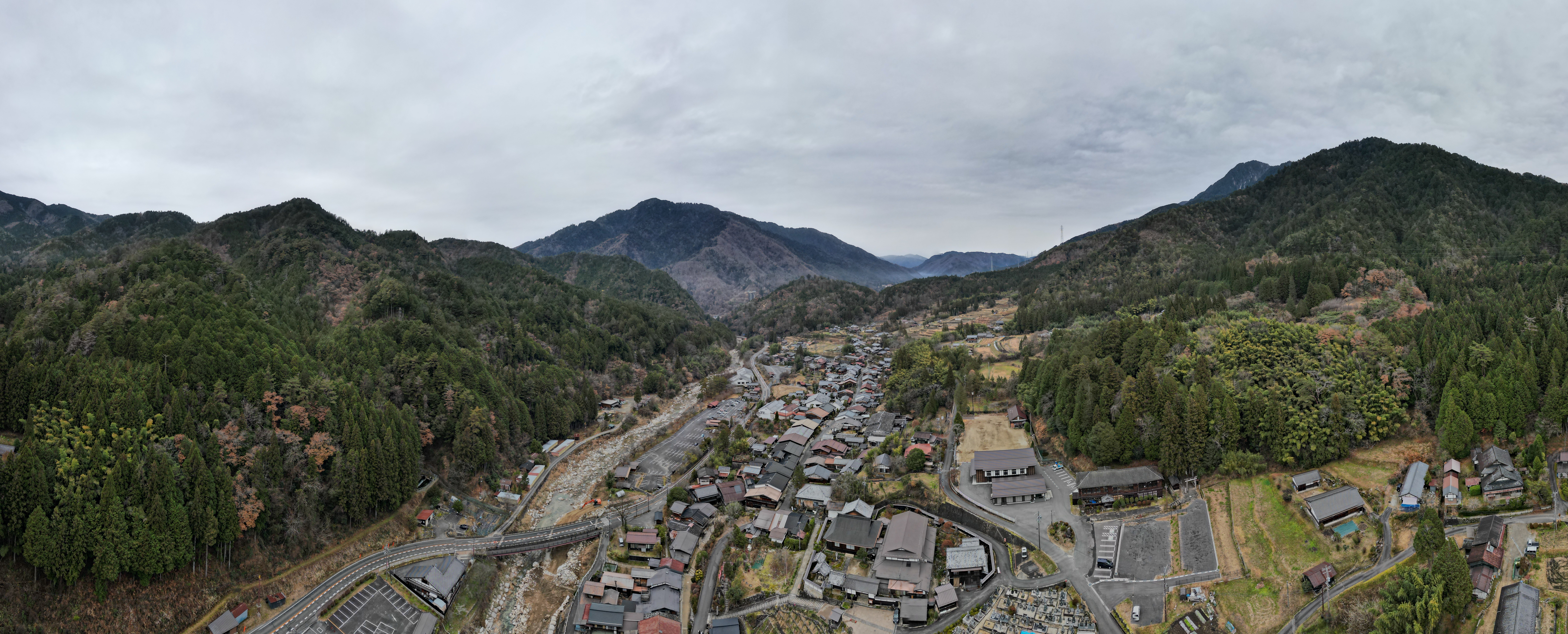
Tsumago-juku 妻籠宿 aerial panorama, December 2024

Tsumago-juku (妻籠宿, Tsumago-juku) is a historic town in Nagiso in Nagano Prefecture, Japan. It was the forty-second of the sixty-nine post towns on the Nakasendō. It has been restored to its appearance as an Edo-era post town and is a popular tourist destination.

== History ==
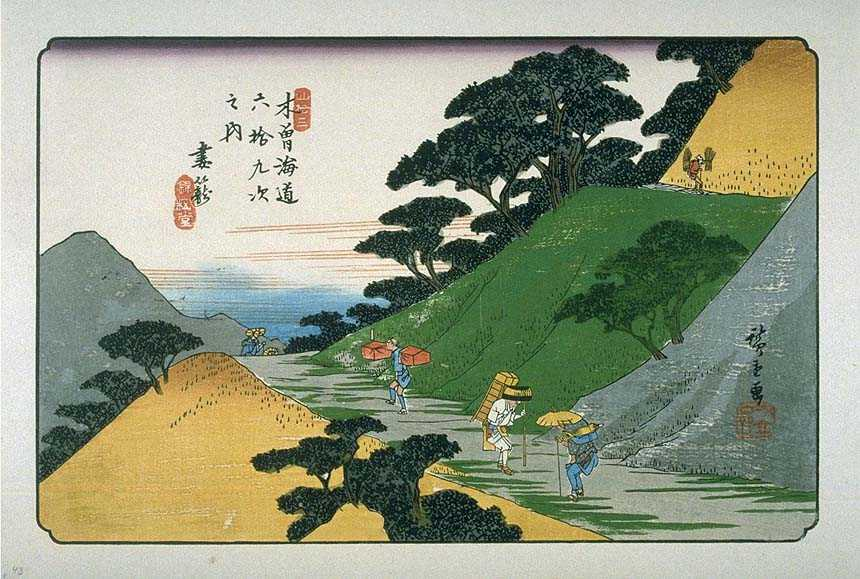
Hiroshige's print of Tsumago-juku, part of The Sixty-nine Stations of the Kiso Kaidō series

During the Edo period, Tsumago was the forty-second of the sixty-nine post towns, which connected Edo (present-day Tokyo) with Kyoto. Prior to becoming part of the Nakasendō, it was the tenth of eleven stations along the Kisoji, a minor trade route running through the Kiso Valley. As such, it was a relatively prosperous and cosmopolitan town, with an economy based on currency.

In 1968, local residents began an effort to restore historical sites and structures within the town. By 1971, some 20 houses had been restored, and a charter was agreed to the effect that no place in Tsumago should be "sold, hired out, or destroyed". In 1976, the town was designated by the Japanese government as a Nationally Designated Architectural Preservation Site. Despite its historical appearance, however, Tsumago is fully inhabited, though with tourist shops as the town's main business.

== Points of interest ==
Tsumago contains a number of interesting properties, including:

- Tsumago-juku's former honjin and Okuya, the waki-honjin, are both open to visitors today. The honjin, which was the main inn of the post town, was originally destroyed, but it was rebuilt in 1995. The original building of the waki-honjin, which was the secondary inn, however, still remains and was named an Important Cultural Property in 2001.
- The Nagiso Museum of History (歴史資料館) contains information on the areas history, the preservation of row houses and data about row houses throughout the country.
- Kabuto Kannon Shrine (かぶと観音) is a small shrine dedicated to Minamoto no Yoshinaka, the "General of the Rising Sun," who built a citadel at Tsumago. The shrine was built around 1180.
- Tsumago Castle (妻籠城) is nothing but a few ruins today. During the Edo period, however, its mountaintop location gave it wonderful views of both Tsumago-juku and Midono-juku. It served as the site of a large battle in 1584 and was dismantled in the early 17th century, as a result of the Genna era's "one country, one castle" rule.
- Rurisan Kōtoku-ji Temple (光徳寺), with its white walls and stone base, rises one story above the area's buildings. Founded in 1500, its main deity was added in 1599, and is notable for its Nightingale floors and a 500-year-old weeping cherry tree out front.

Perhaps its most interesting aspect, however, is the restored row of houses along the former post road. Most were houses built for common people in the mid-18th century, with shops and inns for travelers along the Nakasendō.

A quiet portion of the original highway has been preserved between Tsumago and Magome, the next post town (also restored). It provides for a pleasant walk through the forests and past a waterfall. Also, so guests do not have to walk the path twice to return to the beginning of the hike, bus service is provided between the two ends of the road.

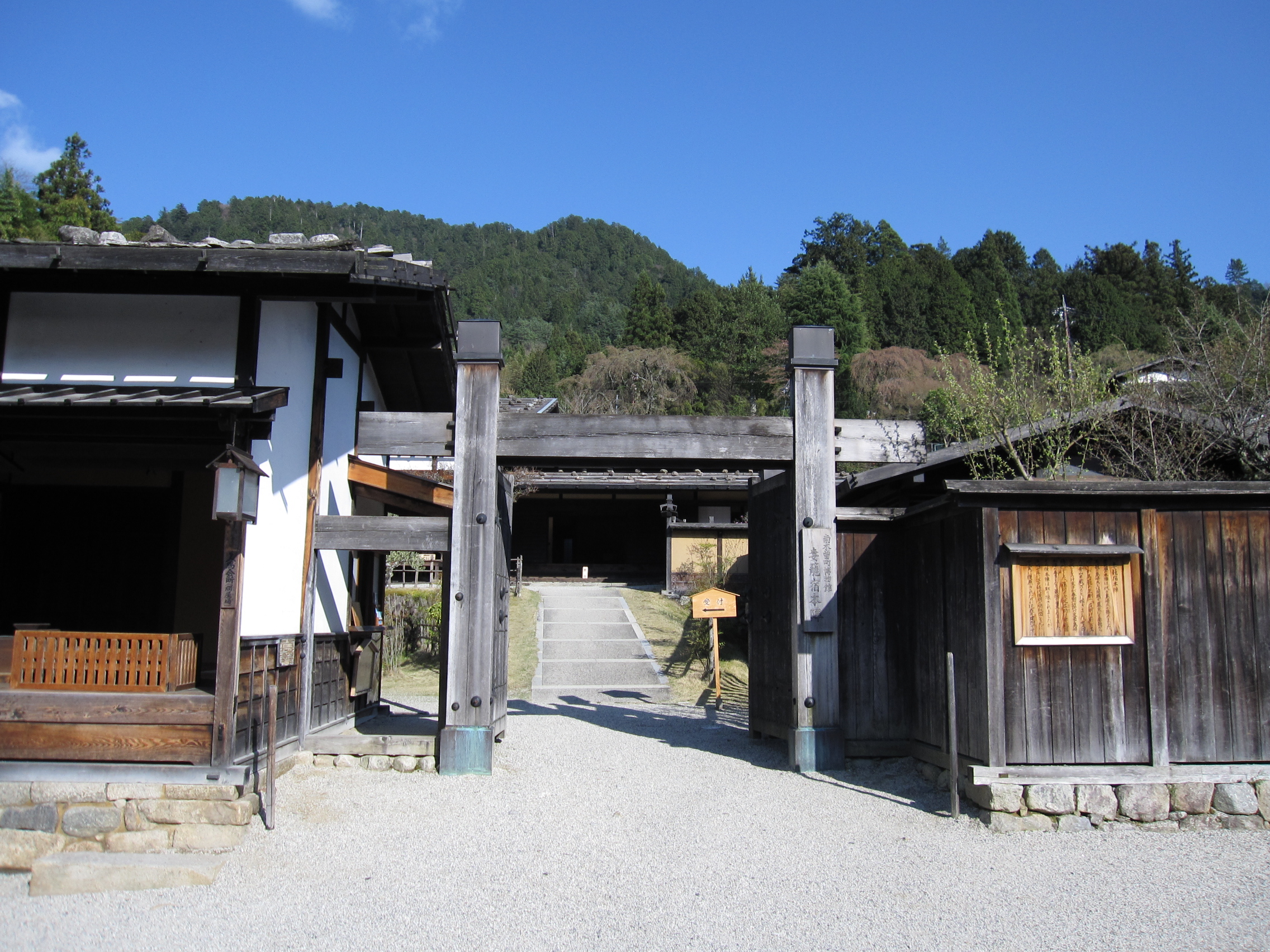
Resting station for higher guests such as daimyō

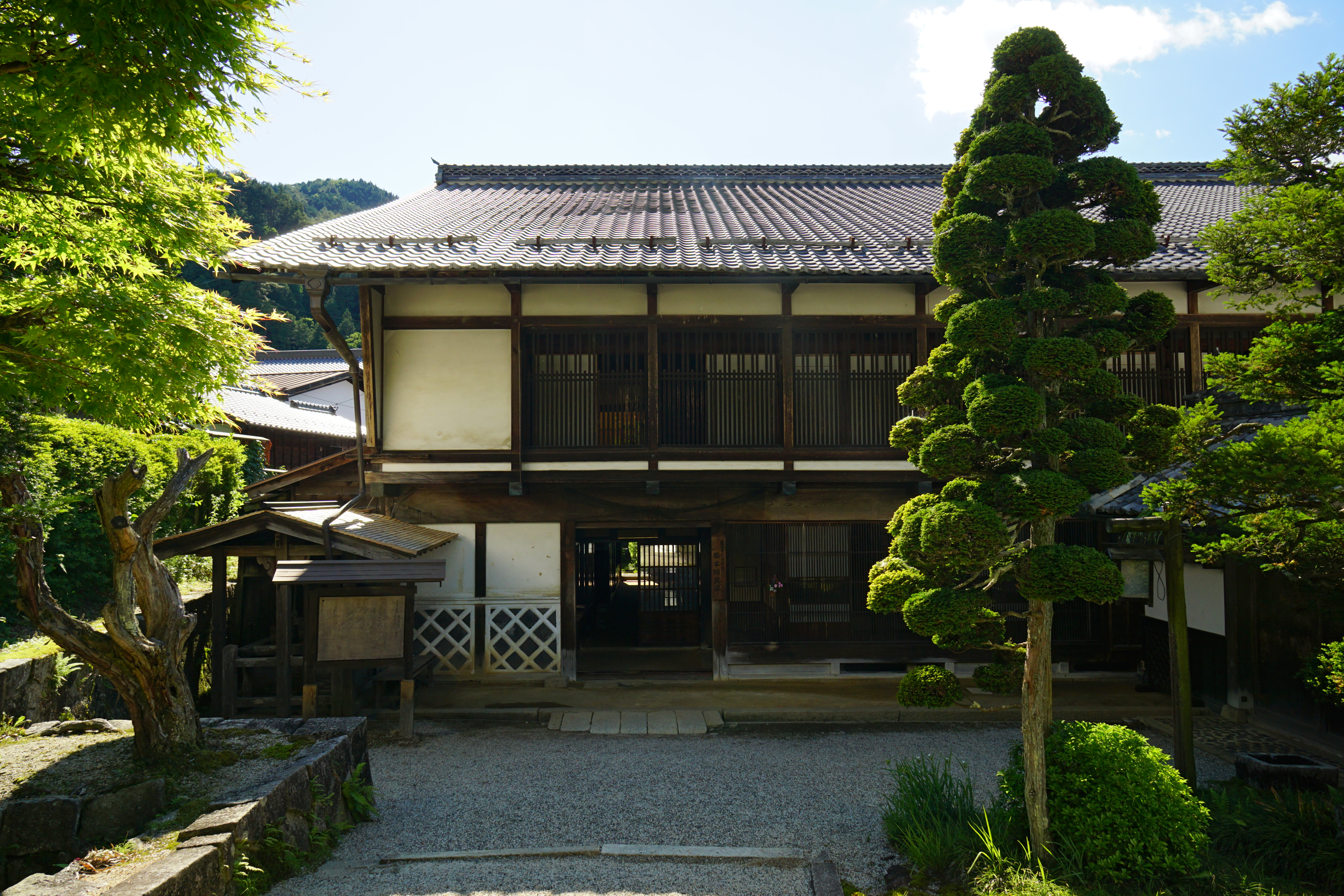
Okuya, the waki-honjin

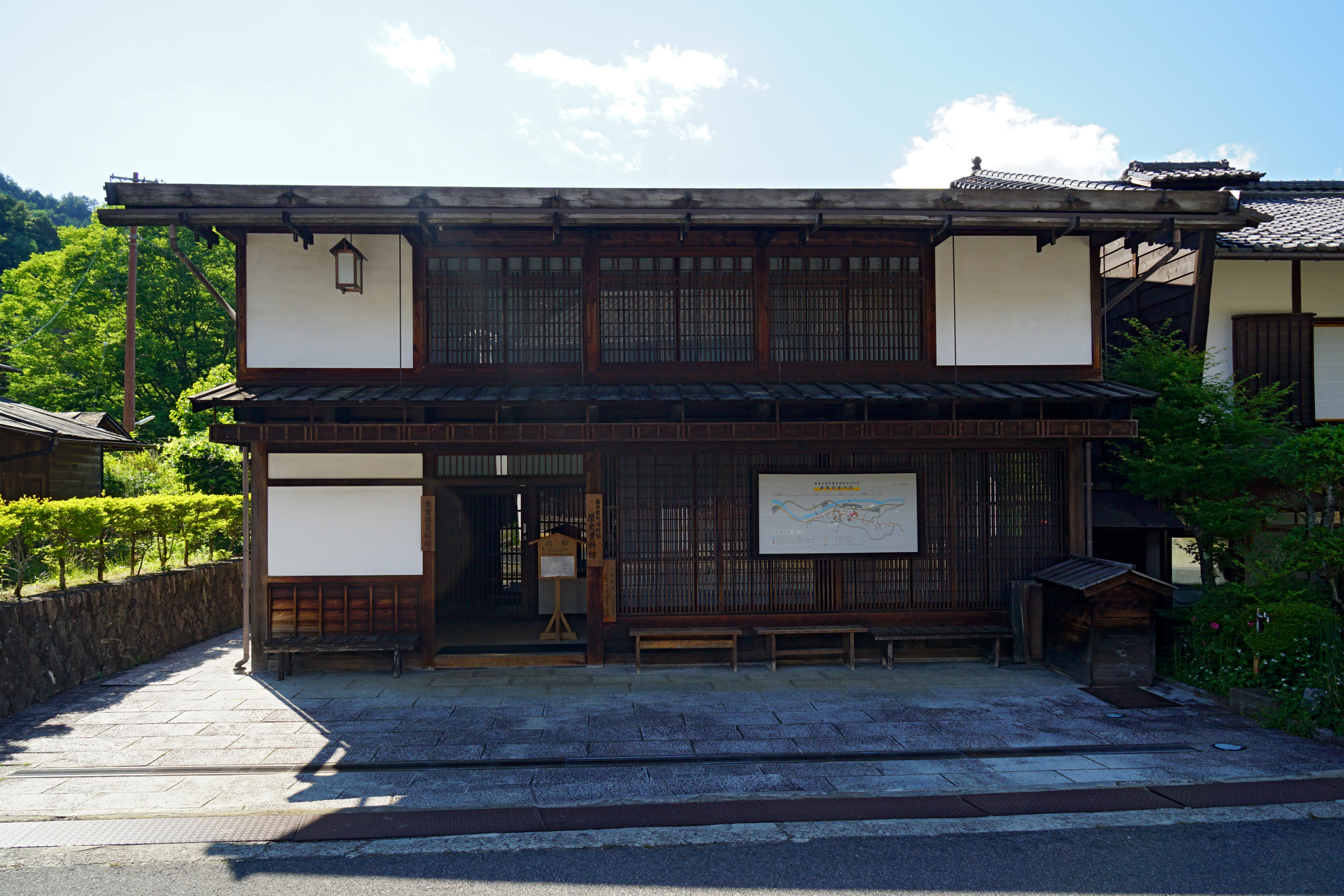
The Nagiso Museum of History

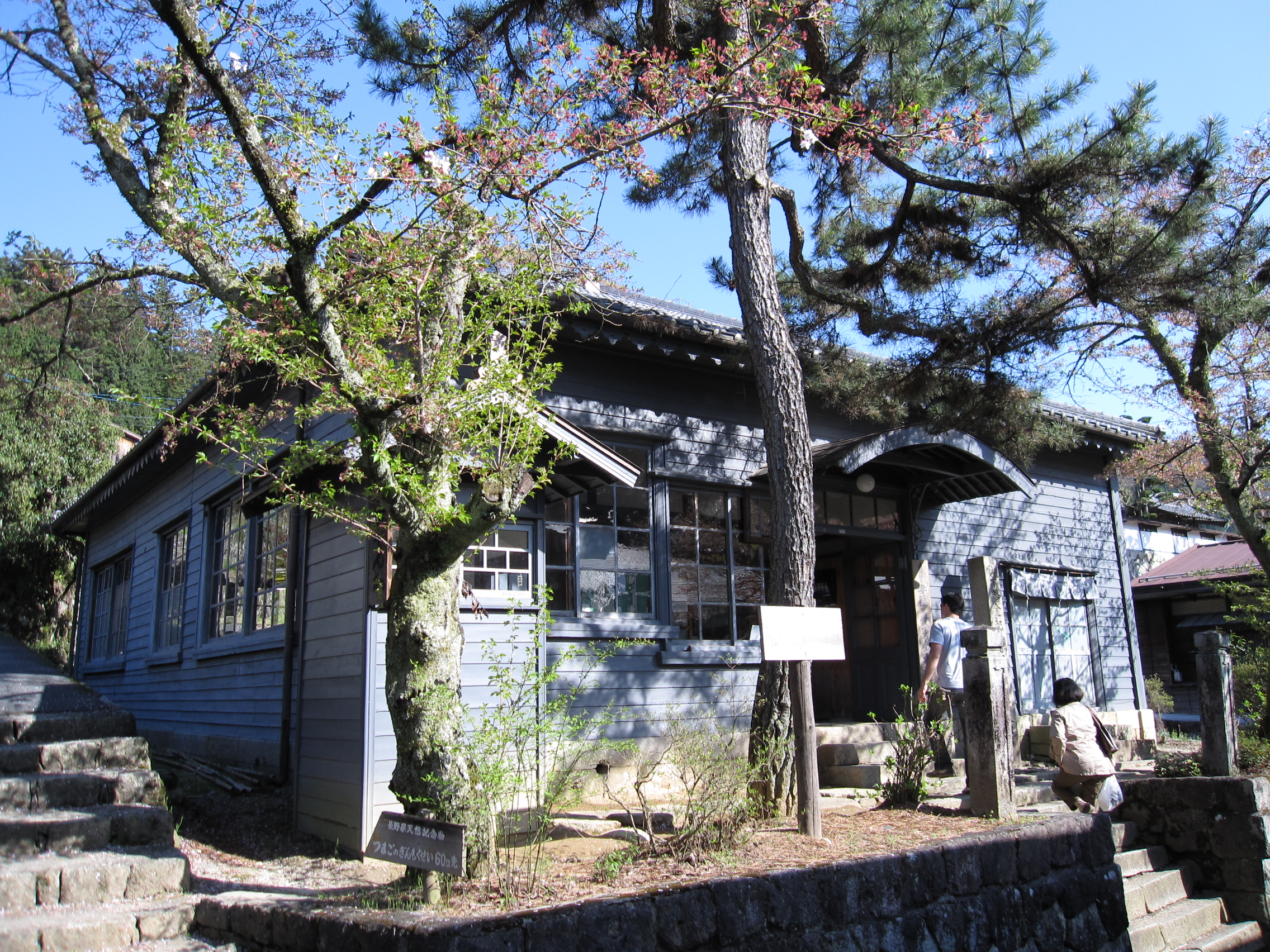
Old school building

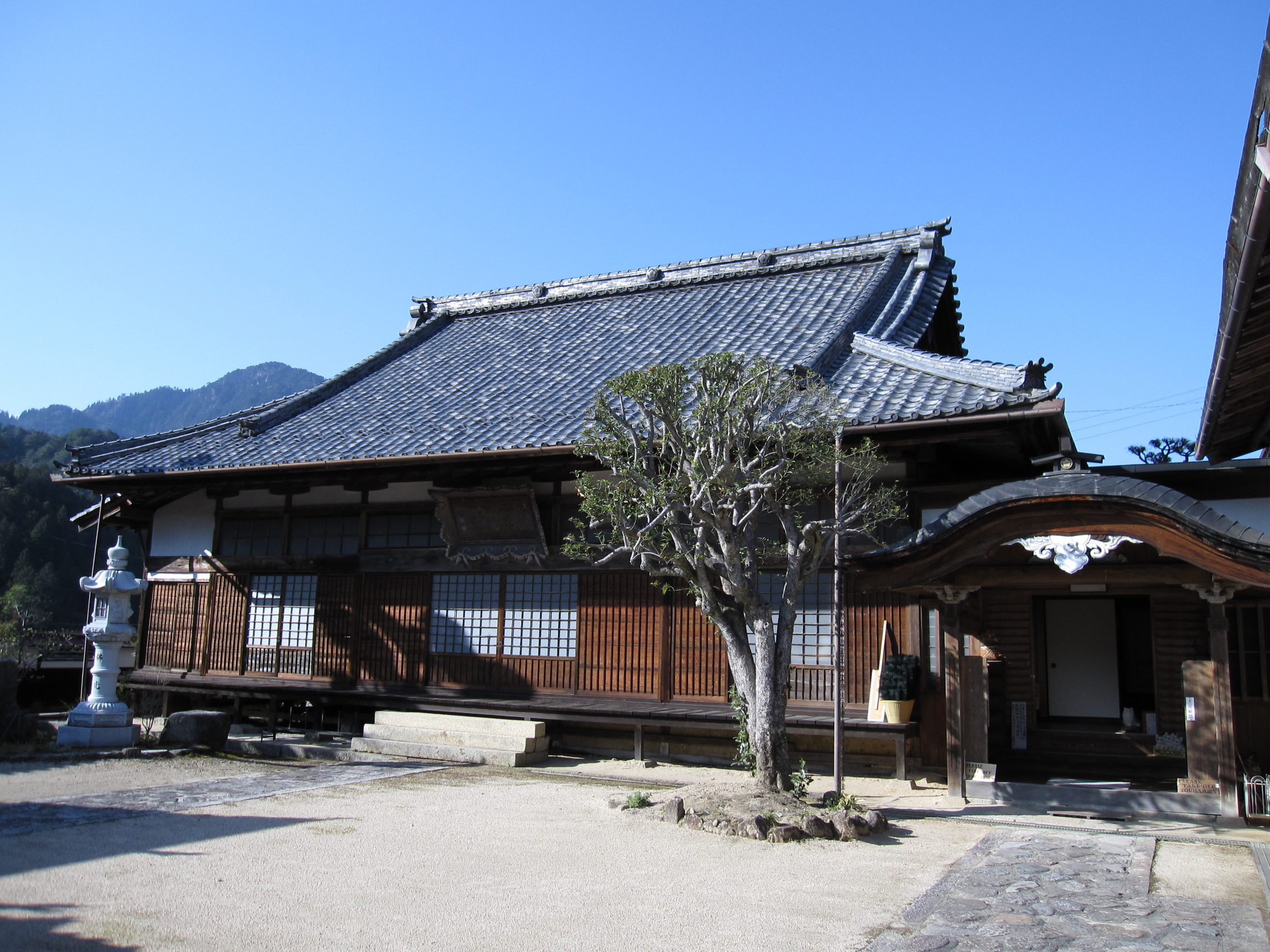
Rurisan Kōtoku-ji Temple

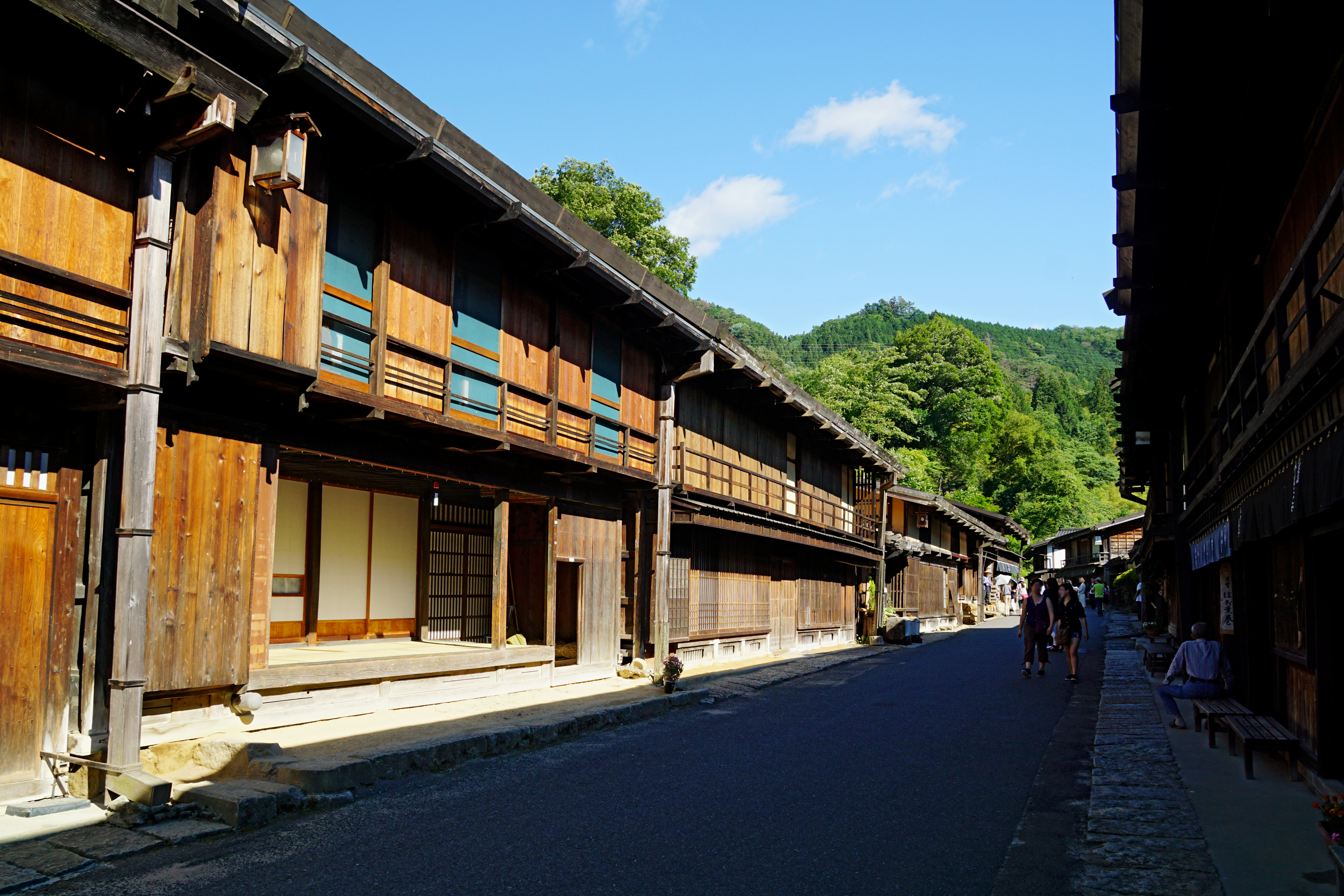
Terashita street

== Neighboring post towns ==
Nakasendō & Kisoji
Midono-juku - Tsumago-juku - Magome-juku

== Access ==
Tsumago sits at the south end of the Kiso District at the juncture of Routes 19 and 256. It can also be reached via a nearby railway station at the town of Nagiso on the Chūō Main Line.

== See also ==
- Groups of Traditional Buildings
