= Midono-juku =

Coordinates: 35°36′31.7″N 137°36′41.7″E

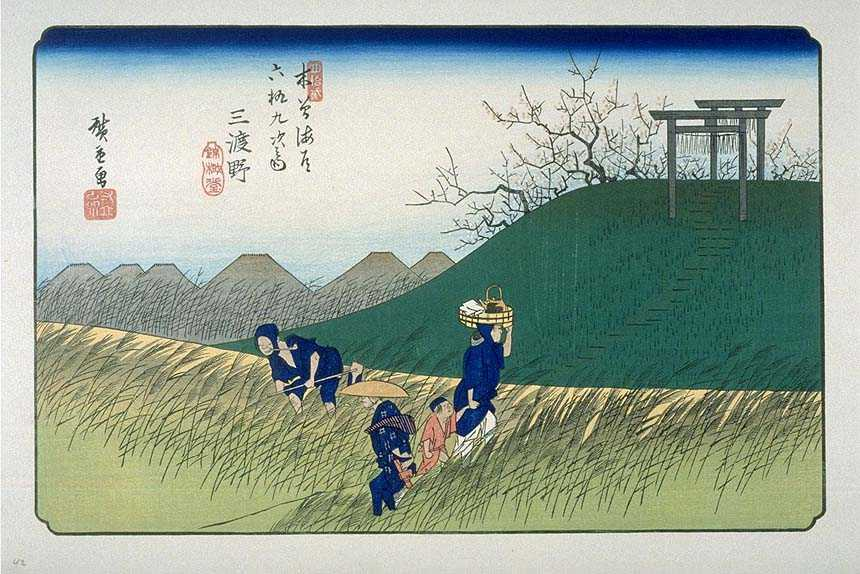
Hiroshige's print of Midono-juku, part of The Sixty-nine Stations of the Kiso Kaidō series

Midono-juku (三留野宿, Midono-juku) was the forty-first of the sixty-nine stations of the Nakasendō, as well as the ninth of eleven stations on the Kisoji. It is located in the present-day town of Nagiso, in the Kiso District of Nagano Prefecture, Japan. It was originally written as 御殿宿 (Midono-juku).

== History ==
The northern part of Nagiso Station marks the original location of Midono-juku. However, after a large fire in 1881 that destroyed many of the buildings, the town decided to develop rail connections and moved Midono-juku to its present location. Throughout the town, you can find representative buildings of Edo, Meiji, Taishō and Shōwa periods, including the remains of a large electric station from the Taishō period.

== Neighboring Post Towns ==
Nakasendō & Kisoji
Nojiri-juku - Midono-juku - Tsumago-juku
