= Nojiri-juku =

Nojiri-juku (野尻宿, Nojiri-juku or Nojiri-shuku) is the name of two post stations in Japan during the Edo period:

- Nojiri-juku (Nakasendō), the fortieth station on the Nakasendō and the eighth on the Kisoji
- Nojiri-shuku (Hokkoku Kaidō), the twelfth station on the Hokkoku Kaidō
