= Niekawa-juku =

Station of Nakasendō in Japan

Coordinates: 36°0′39.8″N 137°51′34.1″E

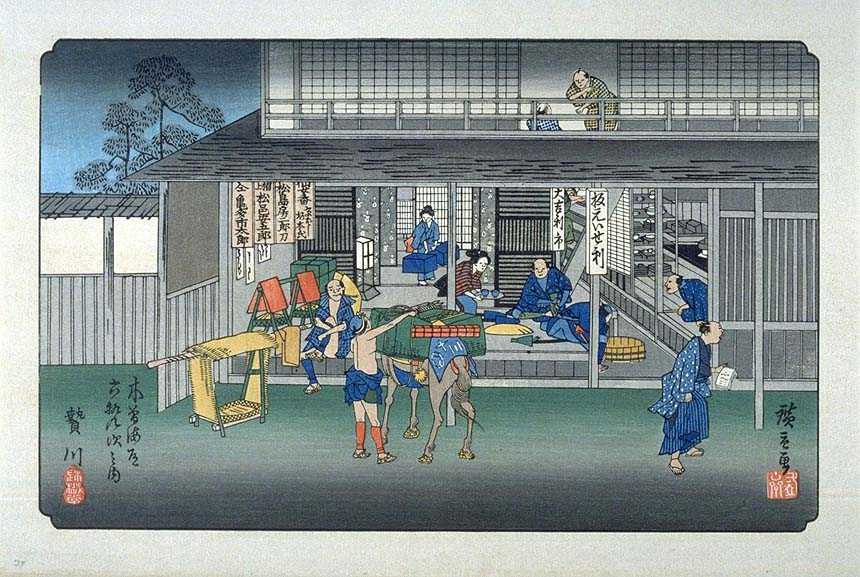
Hiroshige's print of Niekawa-juku, part of the series The Sixty-nine Stations of the Kiso Kaidō

Niekawa-juku (贄川宿, Niekawa-juku) was the thirty-third of the sixty-nine stations of the Nakasendō. It is located in the present-day city of Shiojiri, Nagano Prefecture, Japan.

== History ==
Niekawa was originally written as 熱川 (niekawa, "warm river") because there were onsen in the area, which made the river warm. However, the kanji were eventually changed to the ones used today.

Originally built in the Tenbun period (1532-1555), it was the first of 11 resting spots along the Kisoji (木曽路), which stretched to modern-day Nakatsugawa, Gifu Prefecture. It also marked the dividing point between the lands of Owari Han and Matsumoto han. It became part of the Nakasendō during the Edo period.

== Neighboring post towns ==
Nakasendō
Motoyama-juku - Niekawa-juku - Narai-juku
Kisoji
Niekawa-juku (starting location) - Narai-juku
