= Kiso Valley =

Area of the Kiso river in Nagano, Japan

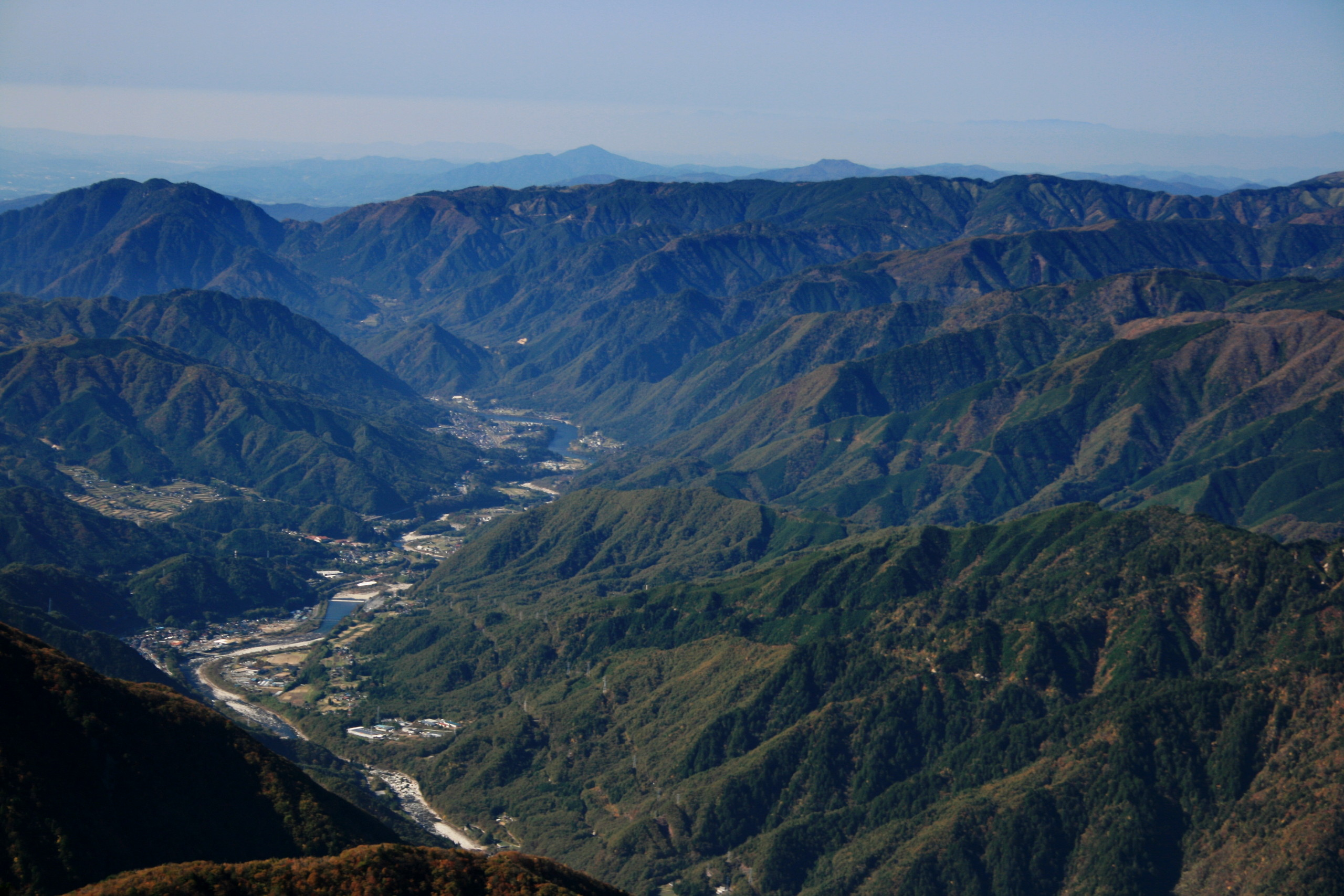
Kiso Valley around Ōkuwa, Nagano.

The Kiso Valley (木曾谷, Kiso-dani) is a geographical area that centers on the valley of the upper portions of the Kiso River in the southwestern part of Nagano Prefecture in Japan. It is a v-shaped valley with length of approximately 60 km (36 mi) that follows the river as it flows from north by northwest to south by southwest into Gifu Prefecture.

== Access ==
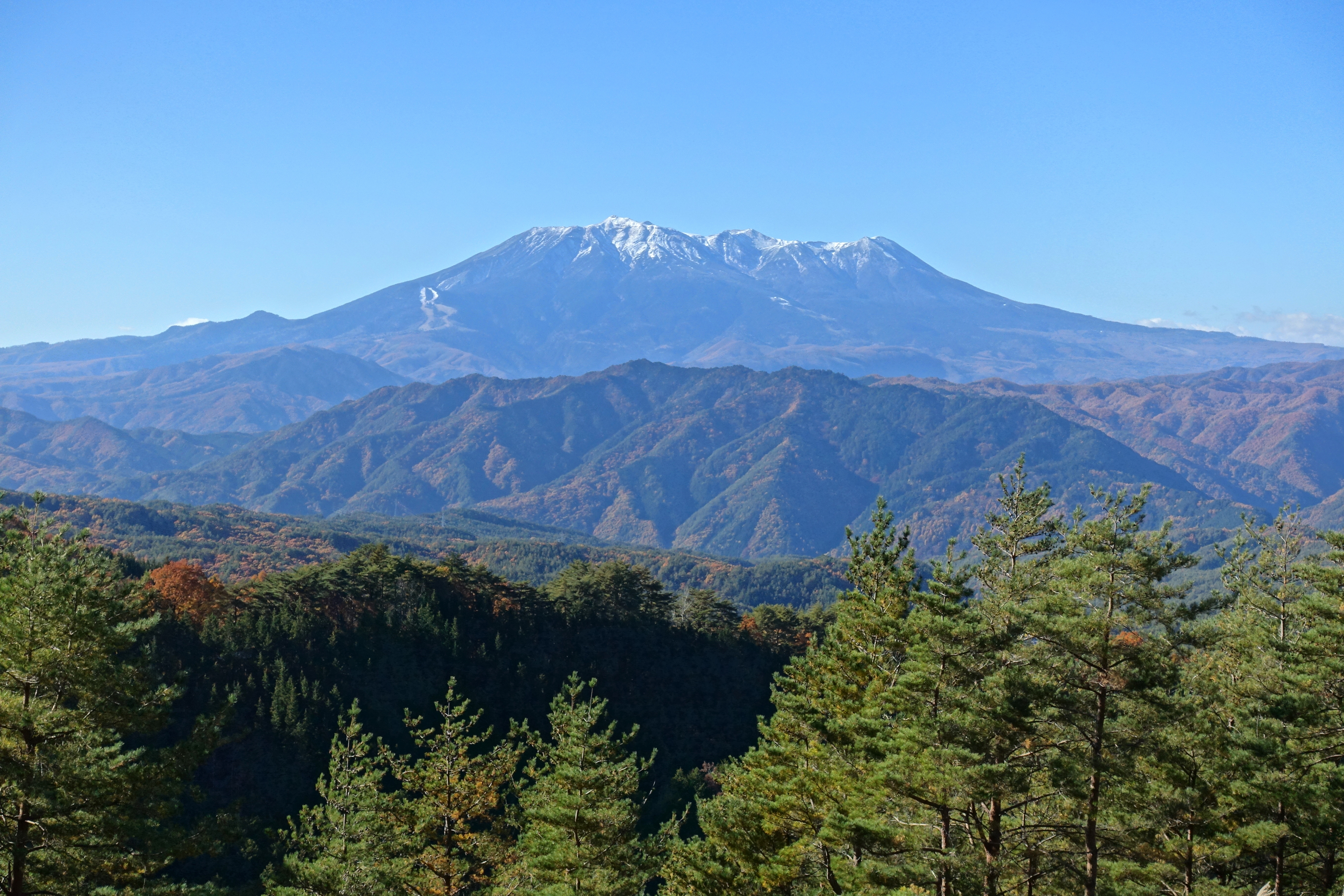
Kiso Valley and Mount Ontake

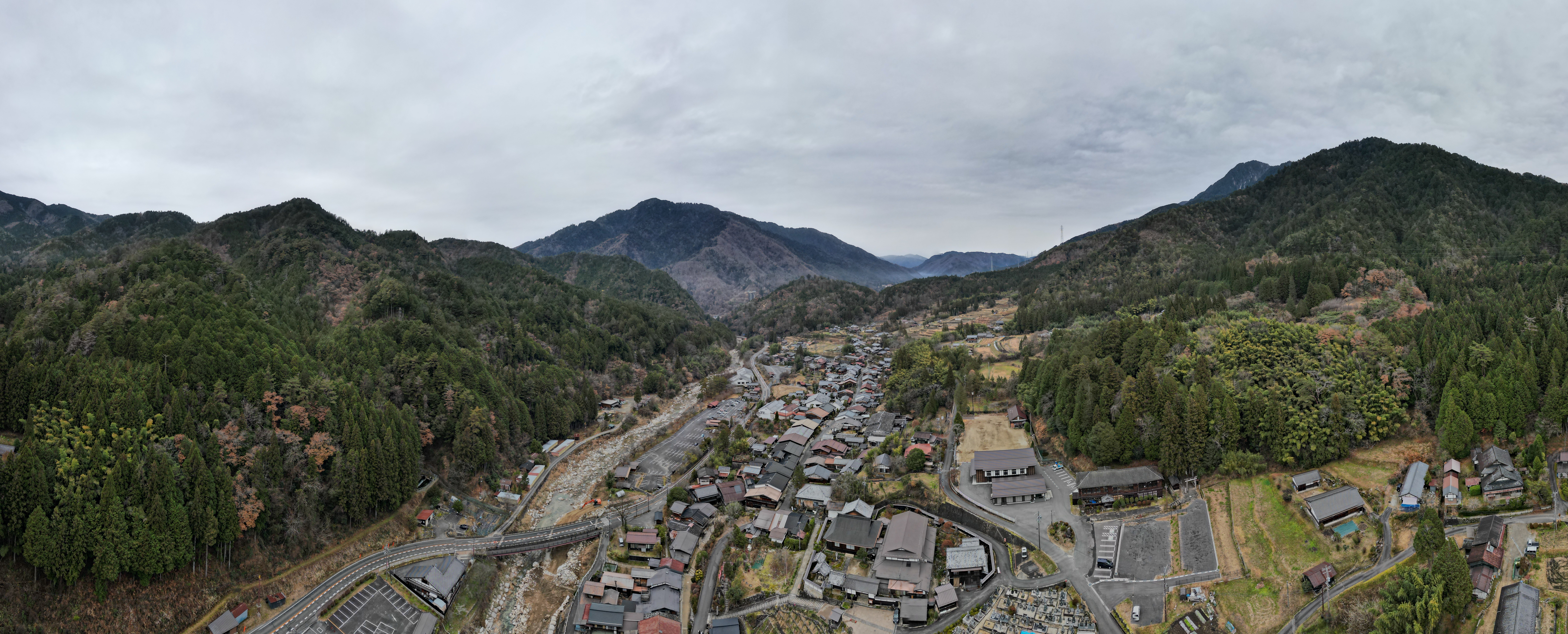
Tsumago-juku 妻籠宿 aerial panorama

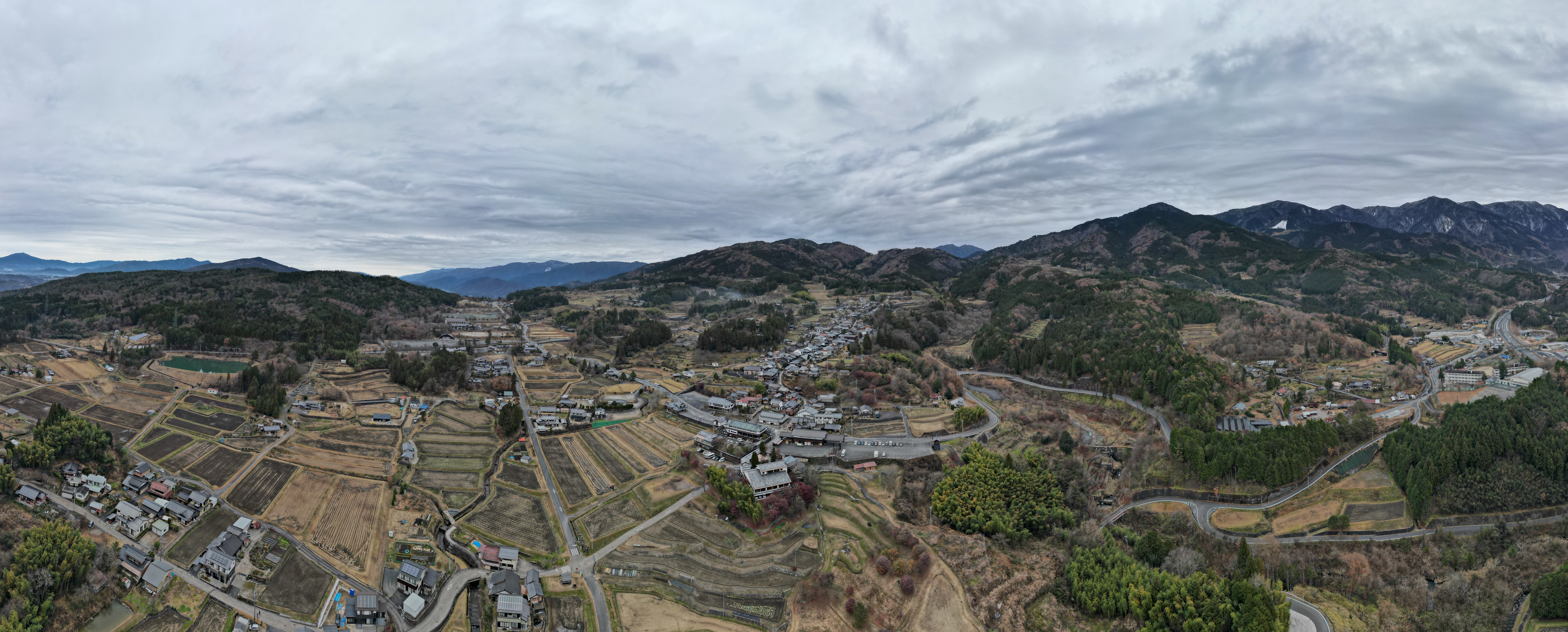
Magomejuku 馬籠宿 aerial panorama

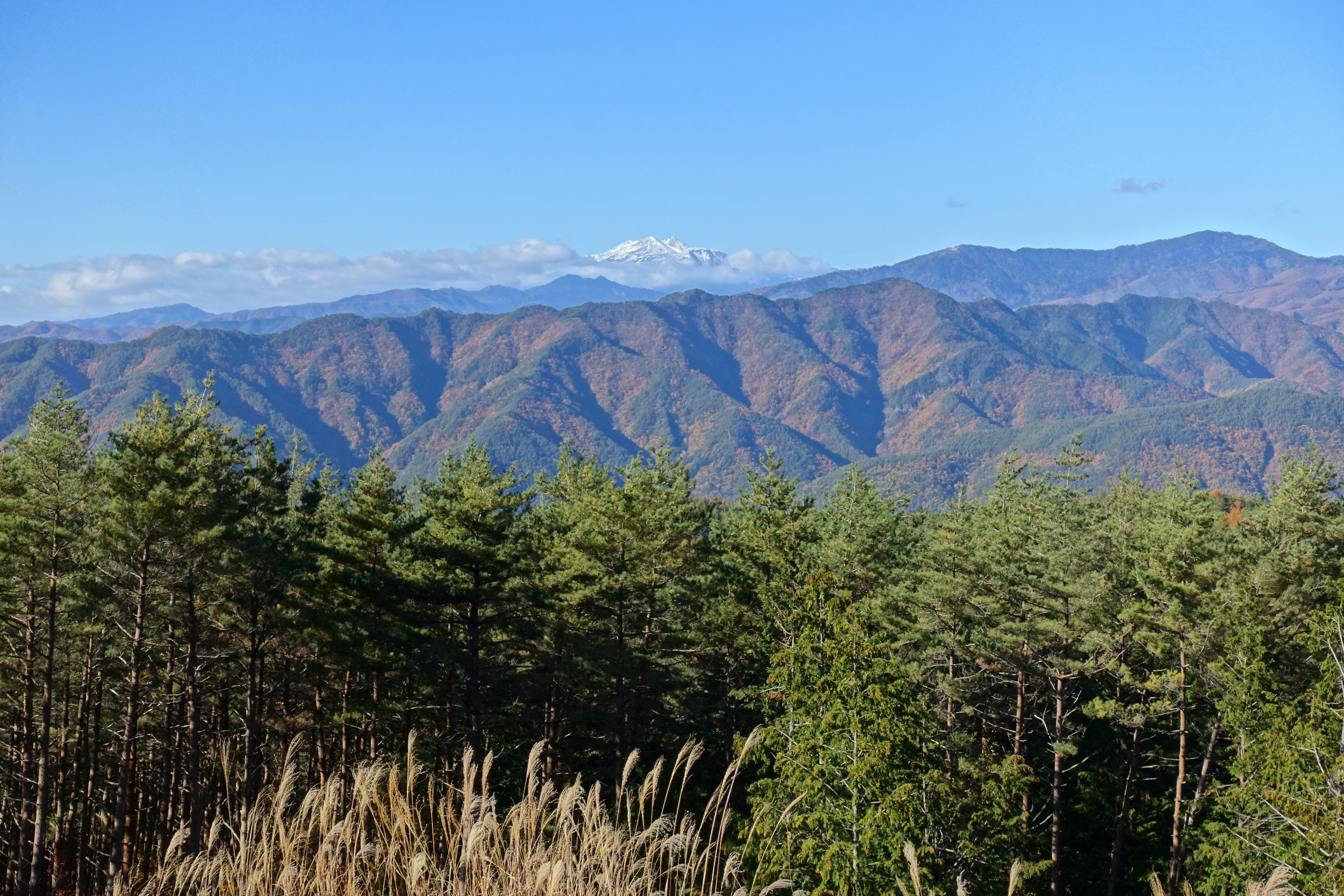
Kiso Valley and Mount Norikura

Through much of Japan's history, the Kiso Valley was used to connect the former Mino and Shinano provinces. However, it came to be known as a difficult route because of its steep climbs. The Shoku Nihongi recorded that the Kiso no Yamamichi (岐蘇山道) was opened in 702. The same route was again mentioned in a 713 article, but it was then called the Kisoji no Michi (吉蘇路). The Kisoji (木曽路) would eventually follow the same path. However the official Tōsandō did not run through the Kiso Valley; instead, it ran from Mino Province towards the Kamisaka Pass and into the Ina Valley. During Japan's Middle Ages, the Nakasendō, an old trade route, ran through the valley, which led to the creation of eleven post stations along the route. Since the Meiji period, the Chūō Main Line (for trains) and Route 19 (for vehicles) have been cutting through the valley.

== Forestry ==
Most of the land consists of steep mountains, so there is little cultivated land. The land that is cultivated can be seen on the narrow flatland along the Kiso River. The area has abundant rainfall with annual precipitation of 3000mm. Forest Industry used to be common throughout the region but since the 1980s has declined.

During the Tokugawa shogunate period, forestry development rapidly expanded. In addition, the Kiso River excavation business was promoted, making it possible to transport large amounts of timber. In the early modern times, the use of forest materials became significant and the depletion of forest resources became a concern, so the Owari-Tokugawa clan started to use forest conservation and deforestation control policies, resulting in the formation of vast cypress forests. After the Meiji era, the forest became a state-owned forest, and in 1889, it became a royal estate as a royal forest. It was designated as a national forest in 1947, after World War II and went under the jurisdiction of the Forestry Agency. After that, there was a large amount of destruction of trees by the Isewan Typhoon in 1959. At the time the forest industry used to be large, but price competition with imported foreign timber in the latter half of the 1980s, and the amount of timber harvested decreased.

== Communities ==
The following communities are part of the Kiso Valley:

Nagano Prefecture

- Kiso District (including Tsumago-juku, a former post town, 35.5753°N 137.5951°E)
- Shiojiri (36°7′N 137°57′E)

Gifu Prefecture

- Nakatsugawa (35°29′N 137°30′E), including Magome-juku, another former post town
