= Ochiai-juku =

Pre-modern Japan post-station along highway

Ochiai-juku 落合宿
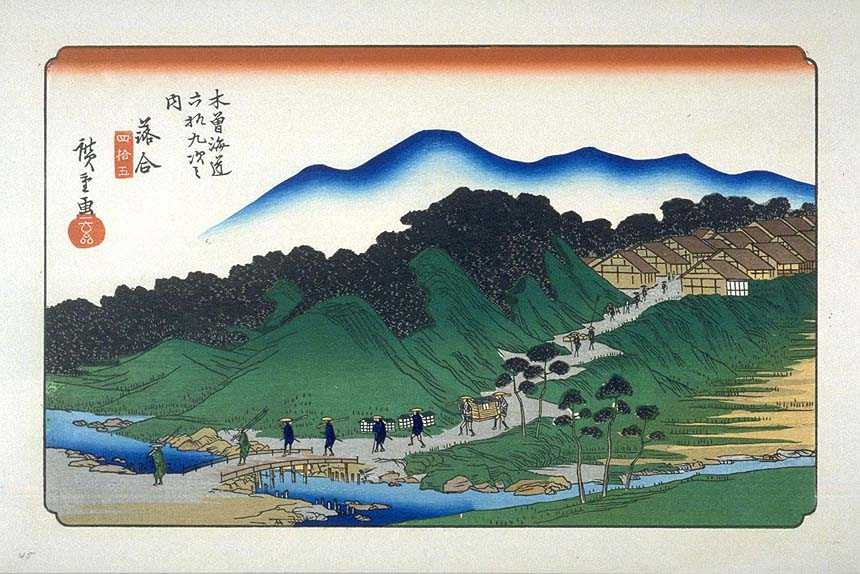
- Hiroshige's print of Ochiai-juku, part of the Sixty-nine Stations of the Kiso Kaidō series

General information
- Location: Nakatsugawa, Gifu (former Mino Province); Japan
- Coordinates: 35°30′41.8″N 137°31′52.5″E
- Elevation: 327 m (1,073 ft)
- System: post station
- Line: Nakasendō
- Distance: 331.2 km from Edo
Location
- Location within Gifu Prefecture Location within Japan

Ochiai-juku (落合宿, Ochiai-juku) was the forty-fourth of the sixty-nine stations of the Nakasendō connecting Edo with Kyoto in Edo period Japan. It is located in former Mino Province in what is now part of the city of Nakatsugawa, Gifu Prefecture, Japan.

== History ==
Ochiai-juku is separated from Magome-juku to the east by the Jikkoku Pass, which marked the informal border of the "Kiso Kaido" portion of the Nakasendō highway In the early Edo period, the system of post stations on the Nakasendō was formalized by the Tokugawa shogunate in 1602, and it became a stopping place for traveling merchants (Ōmi shōnin (近江商人)) and it was also on the sankin-kōtai route used by various western daimyō to-and-from the Shogun's court in Edo.

Per the 1843 "中山道宿村大概帳" (Nakasendō Shukuson Taigaichō) guidebook issued by the Inspector of Highways (道中奉行, Dōchu-būgyō), the town had a population of 370 people in 75 houses, including one honjin, one waki-honjin, and 14 hatago. The post station was located within Owari Domain, and was 331.2 kilometers from Edo.

The post station remains very well preserved, and unusually, both the honjin and waki-honjin have survived.

== Ochiai-juku in The Sixty-nine Stations of the Kiso Kaidō ==
Utagawa Hiroshige's ukiyo-e print of Ochiai-juku dates from 1835 -1838. The print depicts a daimyō procession departing Ochiai-juku across a rustic bridge. The daimyō is riding in a closed kago (palanquin), with a long straggling line of retainers in front and in back, some of whom are carrying his luggage. In the background is the post station, behind which are the high peaks of the Ena Mountains, indicating that the procession is heading towards home in the west.

== Neighboring post towns ==
Nakasendō
Magome-juku - Ochiai-juku - Nakatsugawa-juku

== Gallery ==
Present day view of the Nakasendo as it goes through Ochiai-juku.

Stone column commerating the visit of the Meiji Emperor to Ochiai-Juku in 1880.
