= Magome-juku =

Pre-modern Japan post-station along highway

Magome-juku 馬籠宿
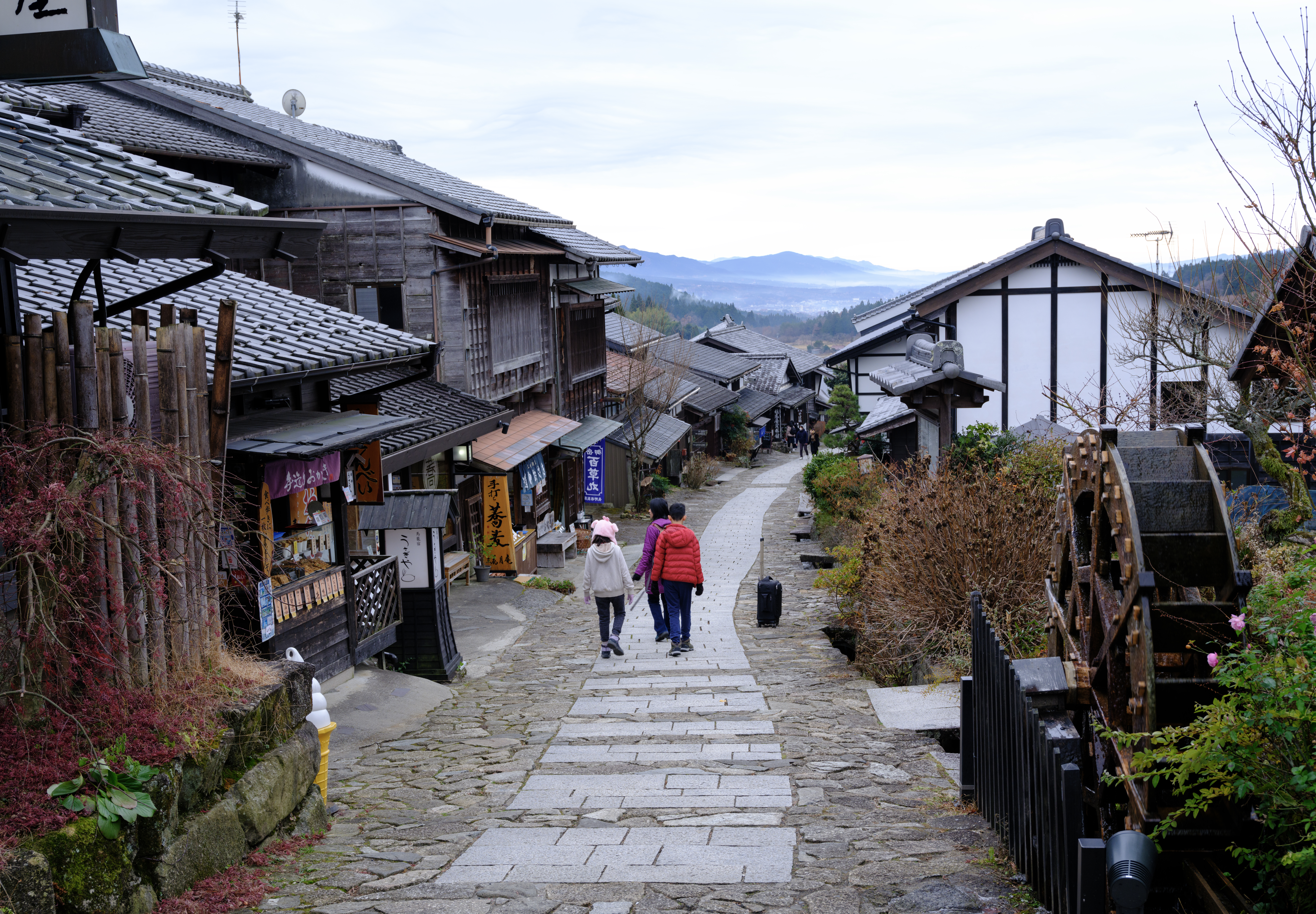

General information
- Location: Nakatsugawa, Gifu (former Mino Province); Japan
- Coordinates: 35°31′36.39″N 137°34′05.04″E
- Elevation: 611 m (2,005 ft)
- System: post station
- Line: Nakasendō
- Distance: 326.7 km from Edo
Location
- Location within Gifu Prefecture Location within Japan

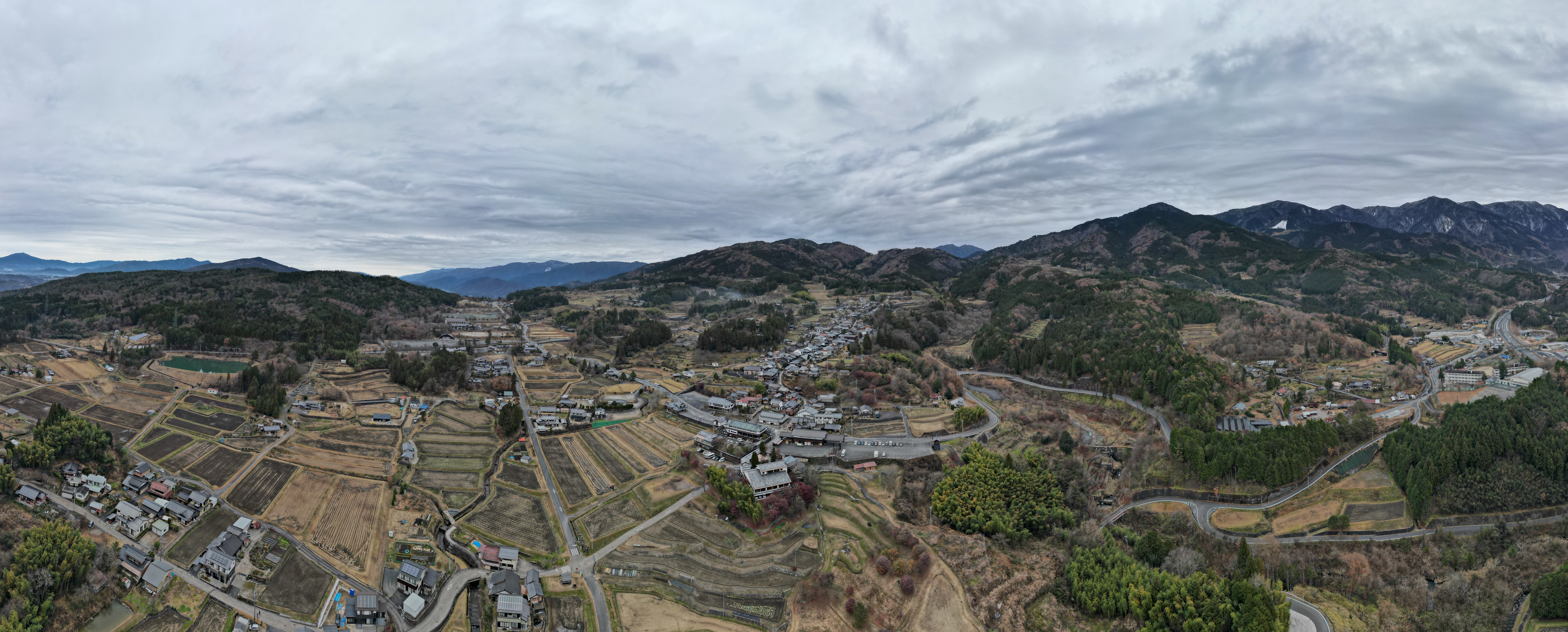
Magomejuku 馬籠宿 aerial panorama

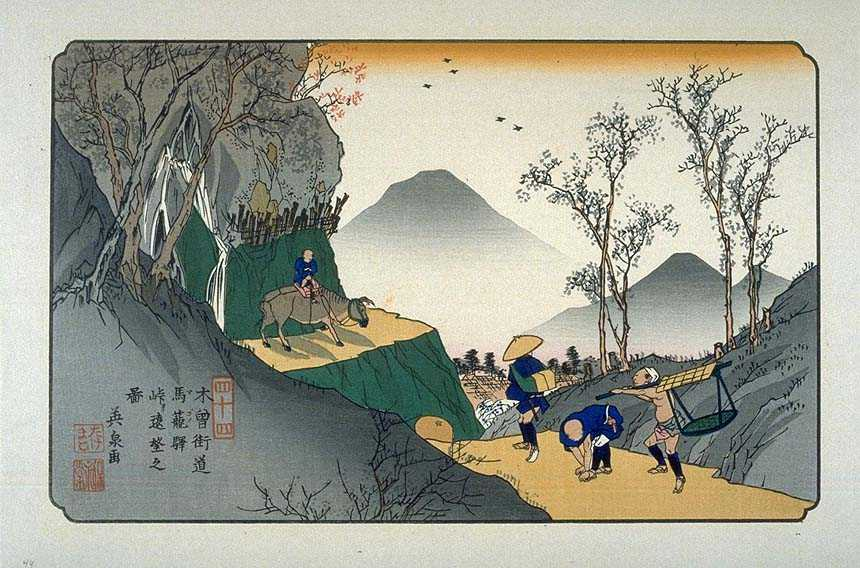
Hiroshige's print of Magome-juku, part of the Sixty-nine Stations of the Kiso Kaidō series

Magome-juku (馬籠宿, Magome-juku) was the forty-third of the sixty-nine stations of the Nakasendō connecting Edo with Kyoto in Edo period Japan. It is located in former Mino Province in what is now part of the city of Nakatsugawa, Gifu Prefecture, Japan. It was also the last of eleven stations along the Kisoji, which was the precursor to a part of the Nakasendō, running through the Kiso Valley.

== History ==
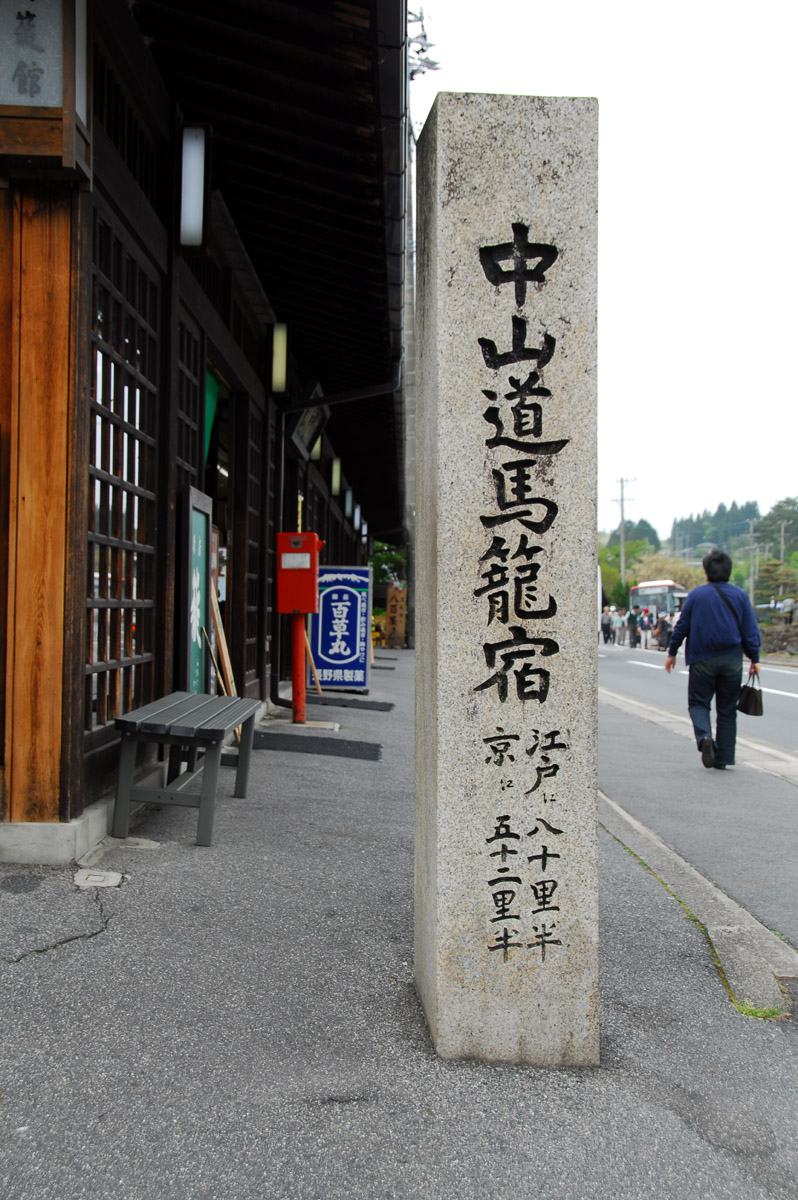
The mileage pole of Magome-juku around the street entrance.

Magome-juku is located in a very mountainous section of the highway between Mino and Shinano Province. In places, the road was very steep and in the section between Magome-juku and the next station to the east, Tsumago-juku, travelers had to navigate an 800 meter mountain pass. The village is very old, and appears in Kamakura period records dated 1215 as part of the Tōyama Shōen, which had been awarded by Minamoto no Yoritomo to Kikuhime, the half-sister of Minamoto no Yoshinaka who lived in this location. In records dated 1487, it was referred to as "Kiso Magome" or "Ena-gun Magome", although Magoma was in Mino, and not in the Kiso River valley. In the early Edo period, the system of post stations on the Nakasendō was formalized by the Tokugawa shogunate in 1602, and it became a stopping place for traveling merchants (Ōmi shōnin (近江商人)) and it was also on the sankin-kōtai route used by various western daimyō to-and-from the Shogun's court in Edo.

Per the 1843 "中山道宿村大概帳" (Nakasendō Shukuson Taigaichō) guidebook issued by the Inspector of Highways (道中奉行, Dōchu-būgyō), the town had a population of 717 people in 69 houses, including one honjin, one waki-honjin, and 18 hatago. The post station was 326.7 kilometers from Edo.

In the modern period, with the completion of the Chūō Main Line railway, it fell into obscurity and poverty; and many of its old buildings were destroyed by fires in 1895 and 1915. In recent decades, it has been restored to its appearance as an Edo period post town and is now a popular tourist destination. The central feature of Magome is its restored row of houses along the former post road, which runs at a slope between the town's low and high ends. Most were built for common people in the mid-18th century, with shops and inns for travelers along the Nakasendō. A quiet portion of the original highway has been preserved between Magome-juku and Tsumago-juku, which was also restored. It provides for a pleasant walk through forests and past waterfalls. Bus service is also provided between the two post towns, allowing visitors to easily start at either end of the path.

== Notes of interest ==
Magome was the birthplace and childhood home of noted author Shimazaki Tōson, who wrote about the Kiso region in his most famous novel, Before the Dawn, between 1929 and 1935. He is buried in the town's small cemetery.

The town also offers a fine view of Mount Ena, which rises 2,190 m (7,185 ft). Panoramic views of the surrounding mountains may be enjoyed from a vista above the main parking lot at Magome's upper end.

== Gallery ==
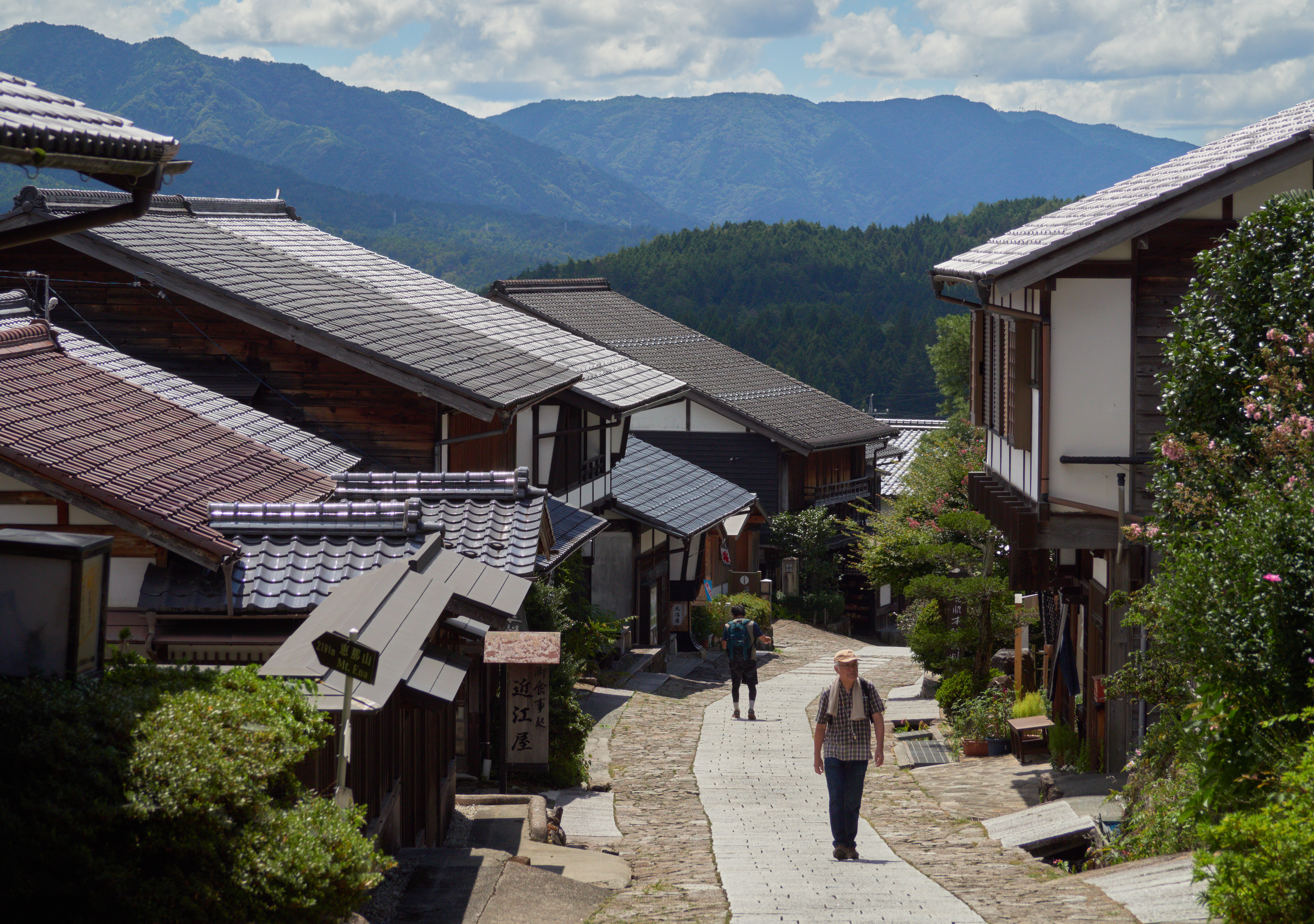
Magome-juku with Kiso mountains in the background

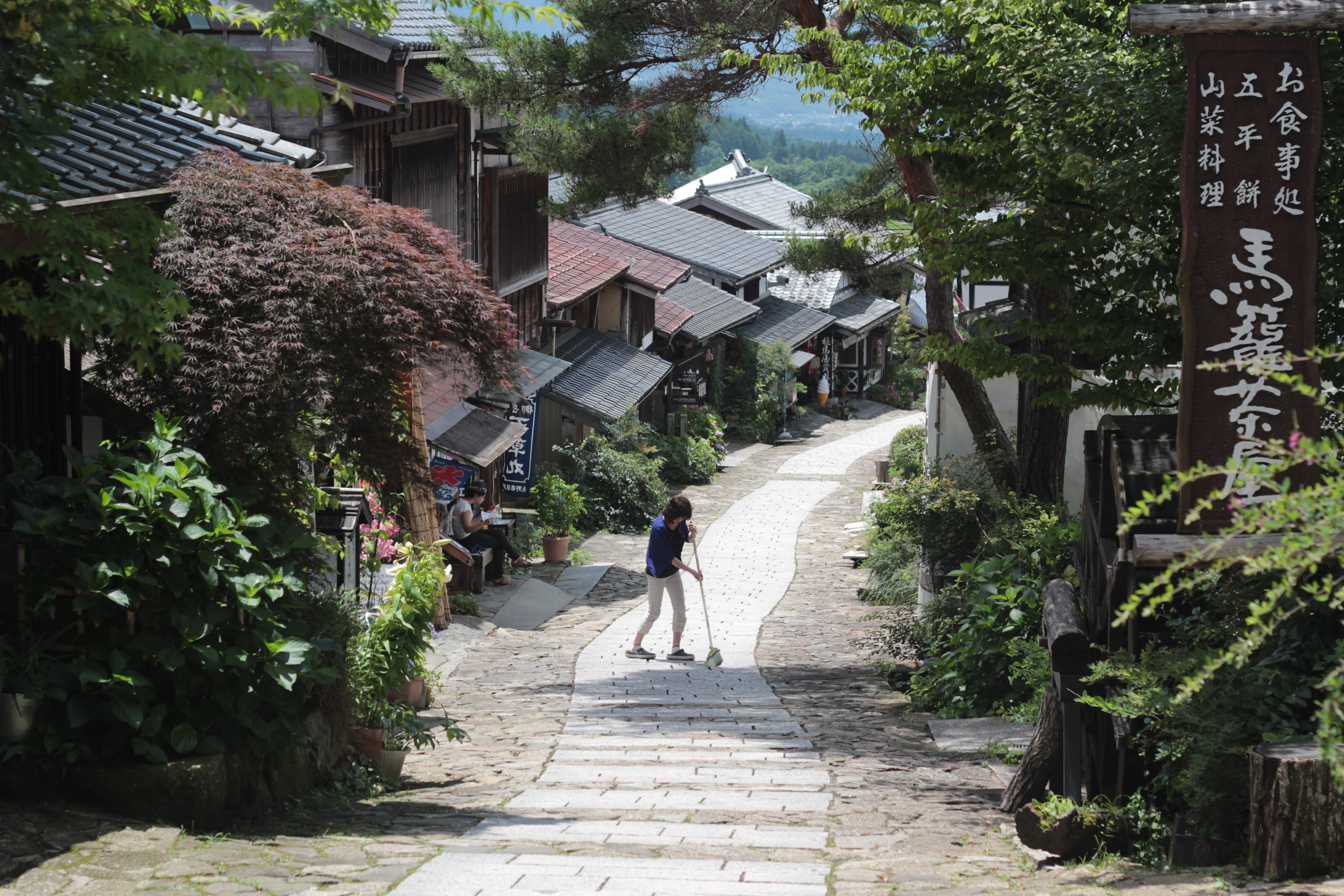
Main street of Magome-juku in summer

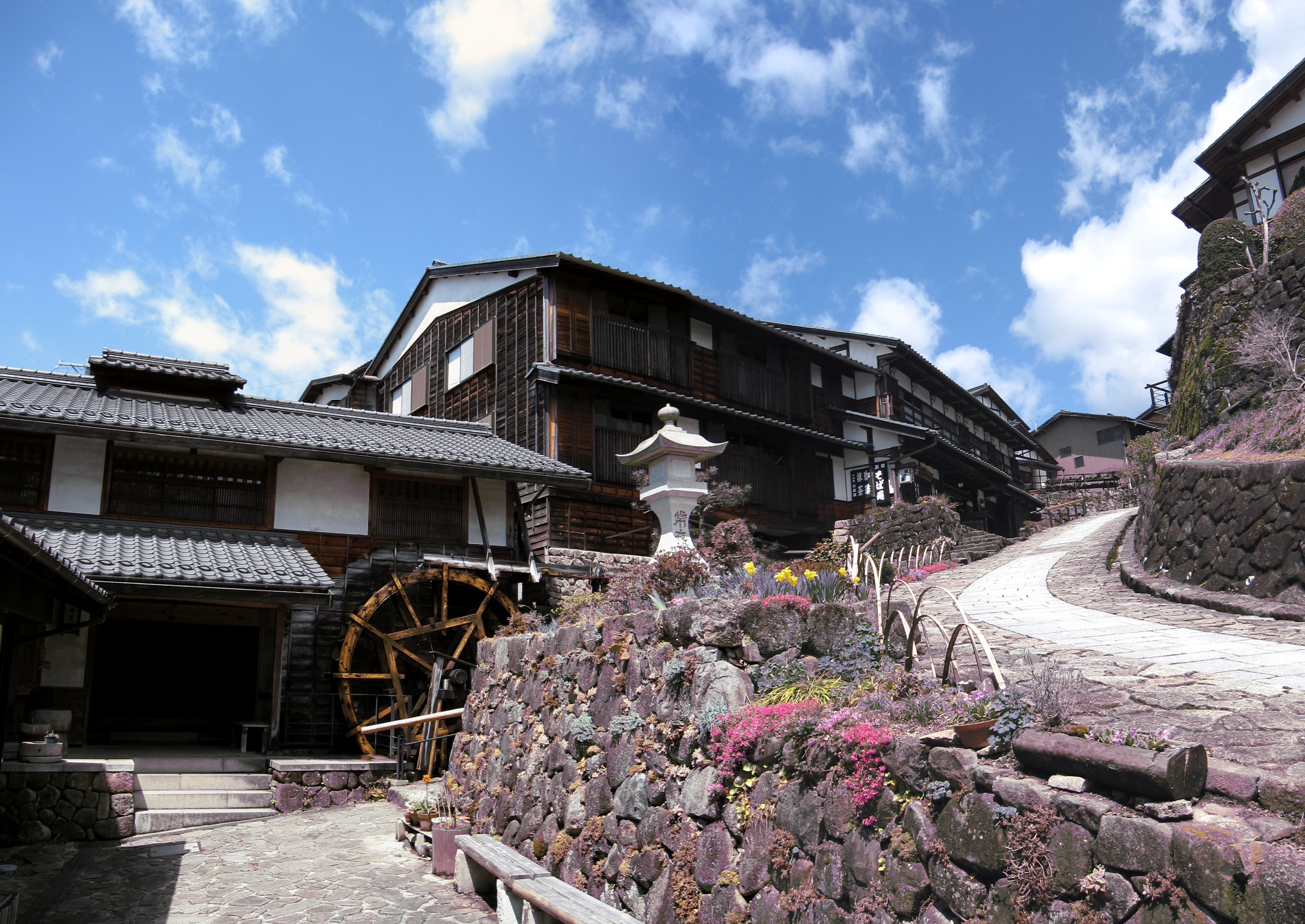
Old water mill

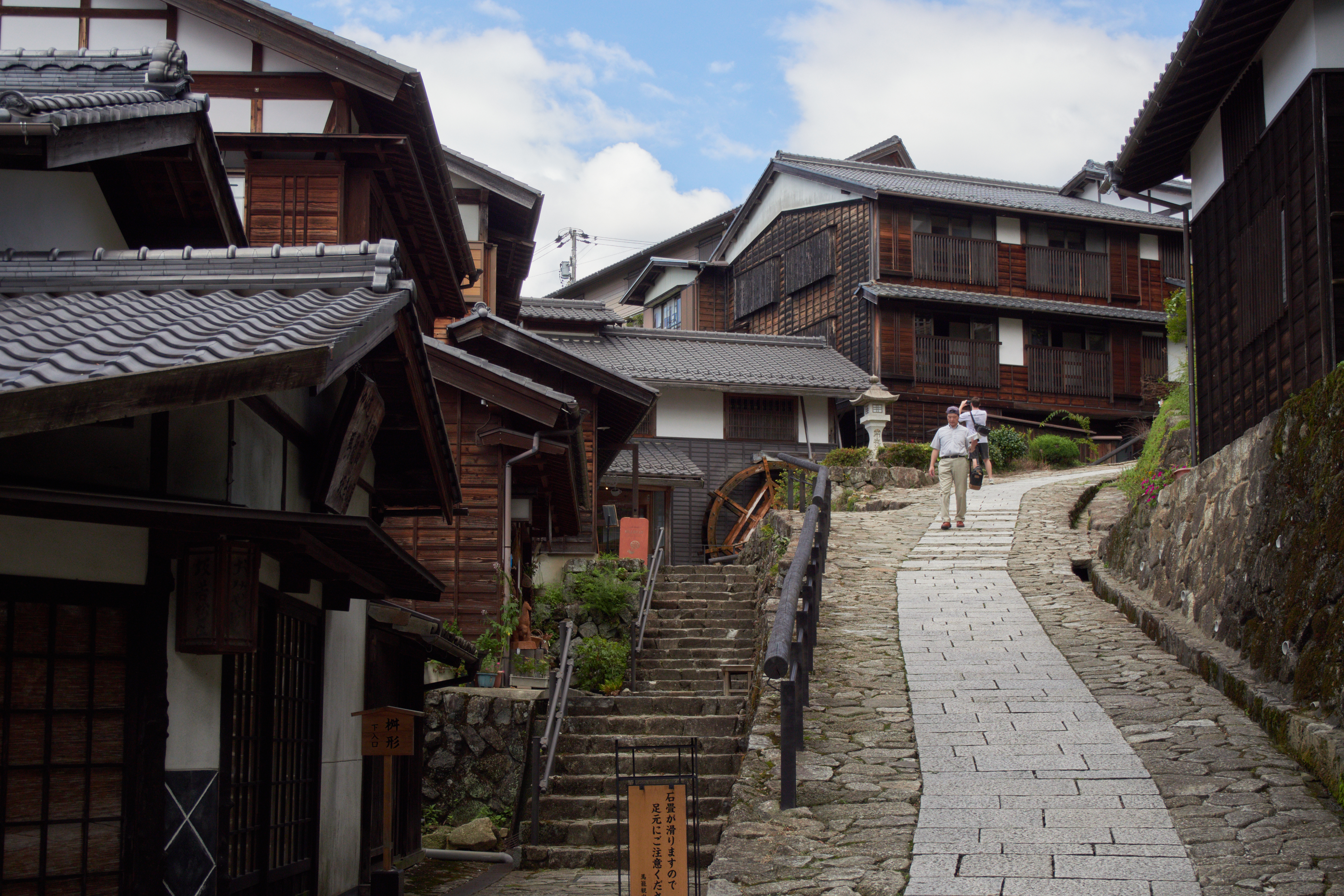

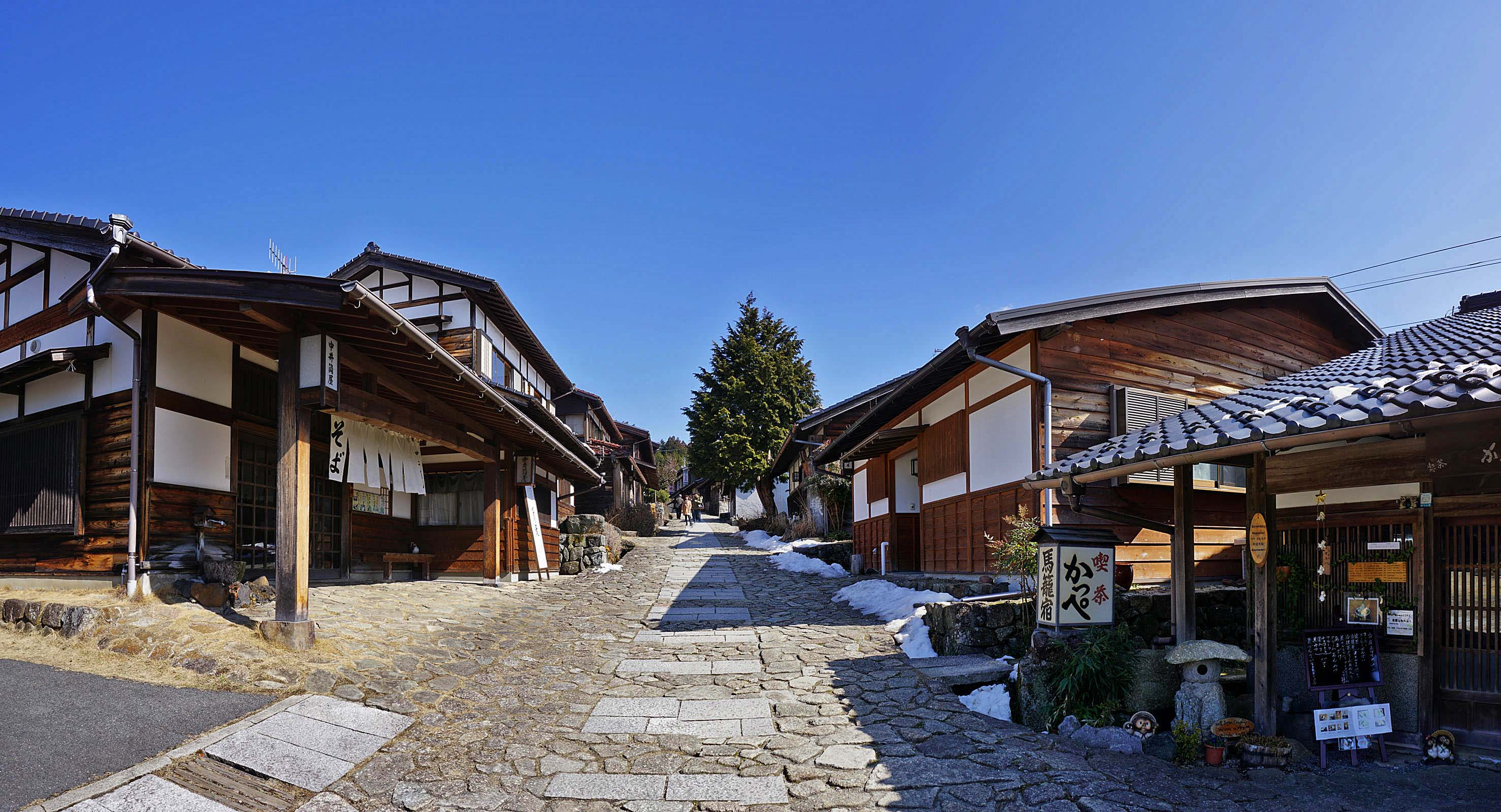
Soba (left), Coffeehouse喫茶かっぺ (right)

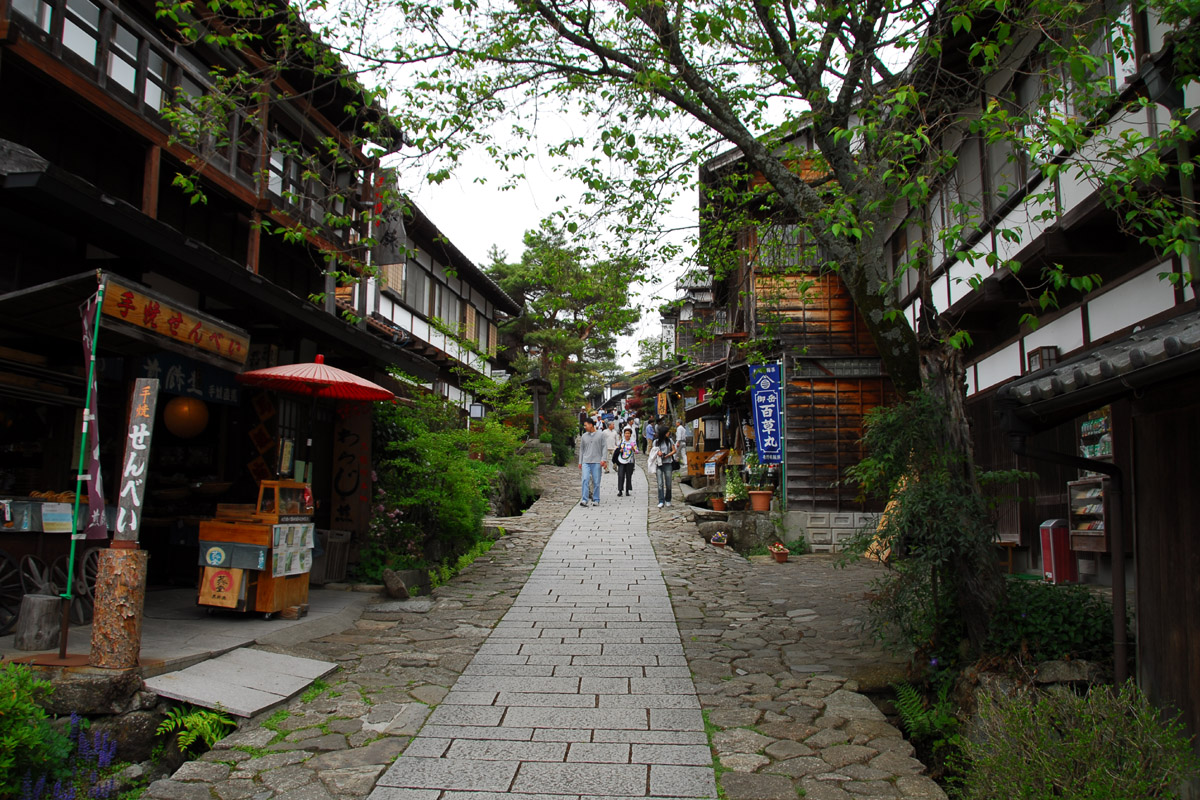
Senbei (left)

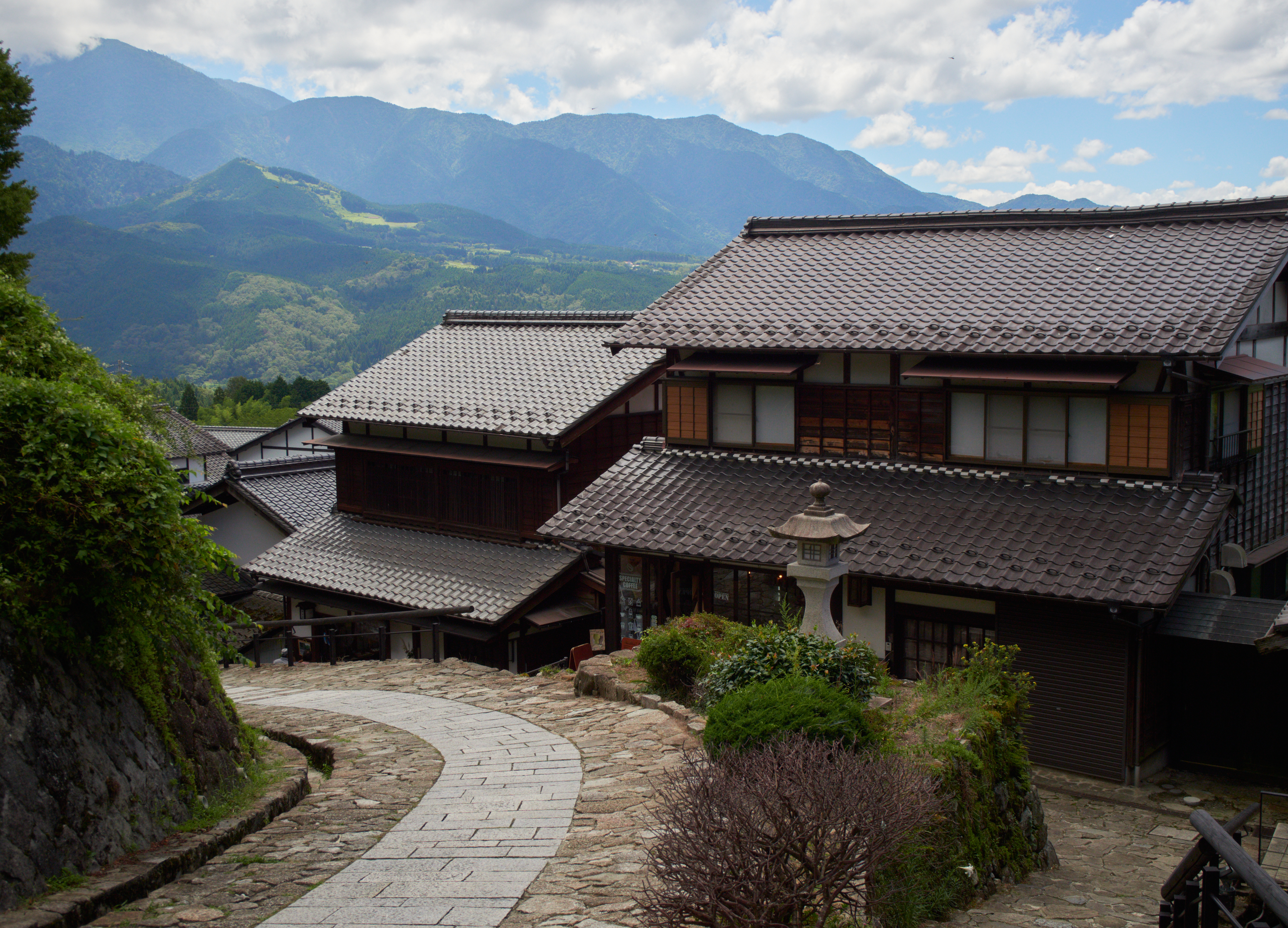

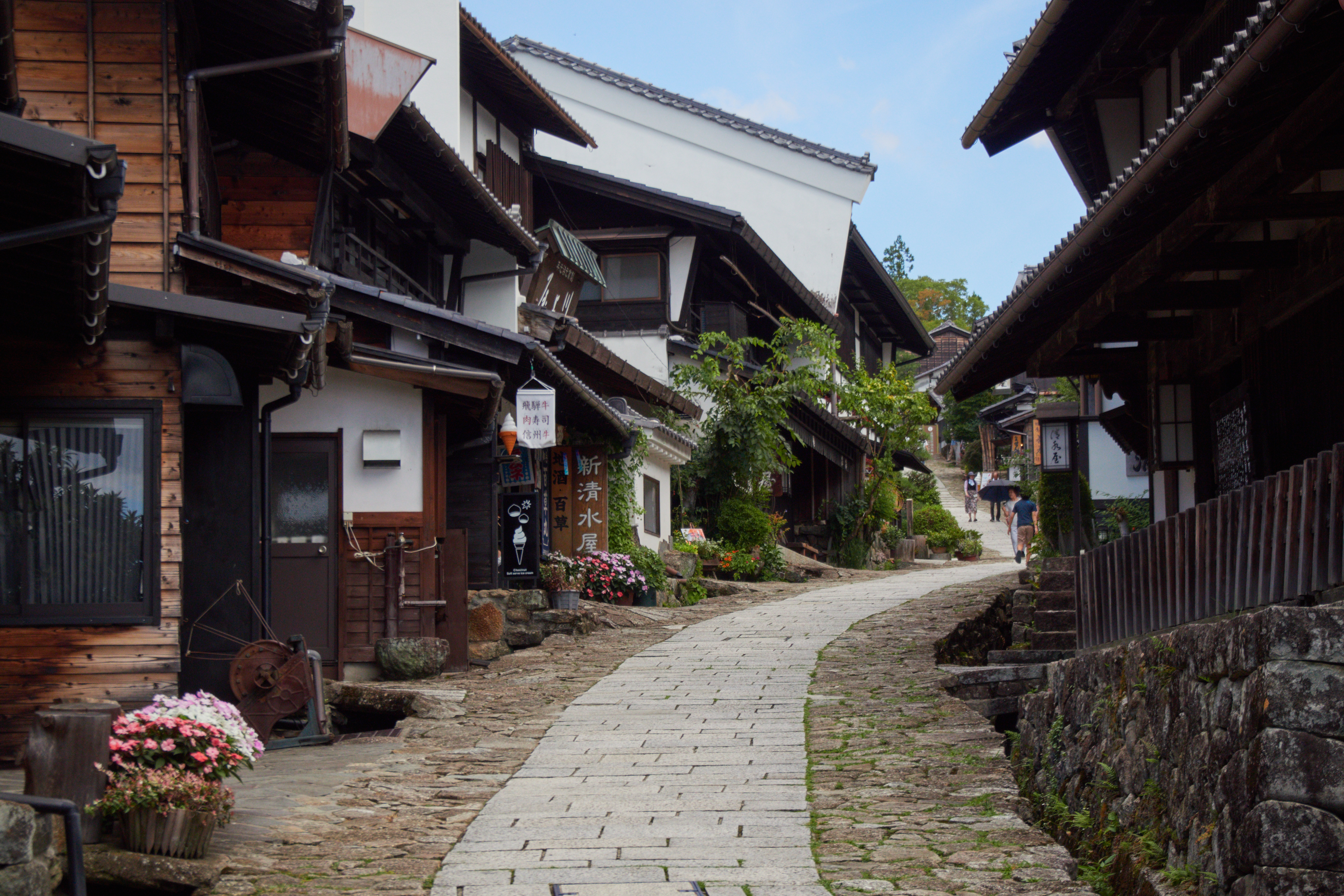

Present day view from above Magome-juku

== Magome-juku in The Sixty-nine Stations of the Kiso Kaidō ==
Utagawa Hiroshige's ukiyo-e print of Magome-juku dates from 1835 -1838. The print depicts the pass between Magome-juku and Tsumago-juku, with a narrow road wedged between the side of a mountain and a steep cliff. A man is followed by two Kago (palanquin) bearers, one of whom is carrying the empty kago by one pole on his shoulder while the other is retying his straw sandal. A man is approaching from the opposite direction, but we can see only the top of his straw hat, emphasizing the steep slope of the road. Further in the distance, an oxherd is riding his ox past a waterfall, and the roofs of the post station can be seen in the valley below. In the distance, Mount Ena looms as a grey shadow.

== Neighboring post towns ==
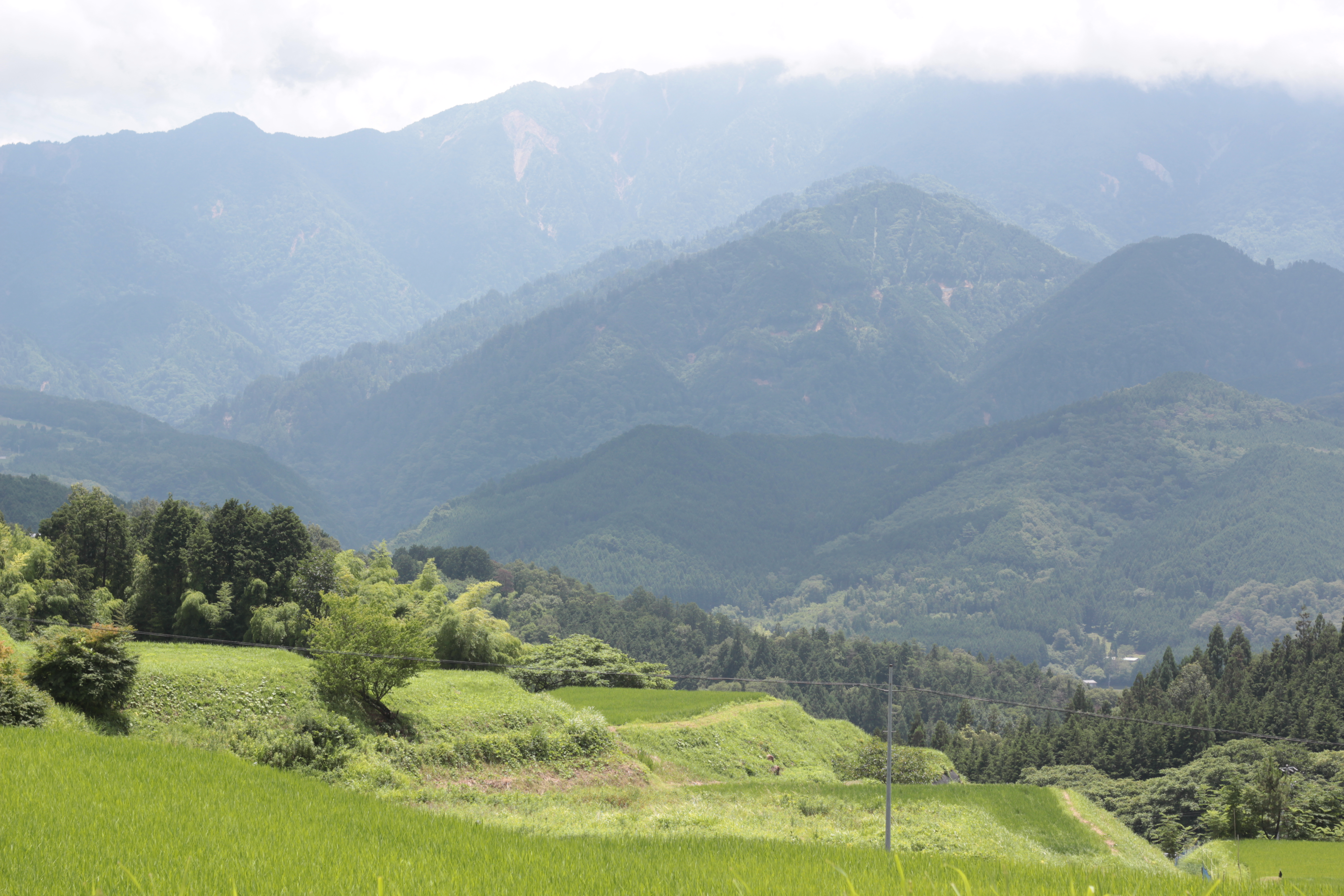
View from the top of the hill in Magome-juku

Nakasendō
Tsumago-juku - Magome-juku - Ochiai-juku
Kisoji
Tsumago-juku - Magome-juku (ending location)
