= Nojiri-juku (Nakasendō) =

Coordinates: 35°40′26.7″N 137°38′19.7″E

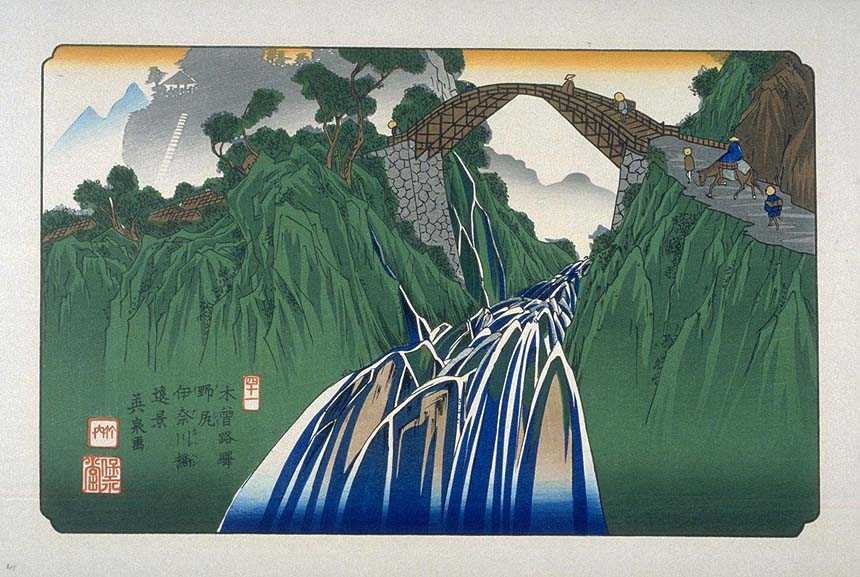
Keisai Eisen's print of Nojiri-juku, part of The Sixty-nine Stations of the Kiso Kaidō series

Nojiri-juku (野尻宿, Nojiri-juku) was the fortieth of the sixty-nine stations of the Nakasendō, as well as the eighth of eleven stations on the Kisoji. It is located in the present-day village of Ōkuwa, in the Kiso District of Nagano Prefecture, Japan.

== History ==
Nojiri-juku was the longest post town along the Kisoji, after Narai-juku. Because of all the turns in the road, though, it was often called "Nana-mawari (七回り)," which means "seven turns." However, there was a large fire in 1791, which destroyed much of the post town.

== Neighboring post towns ==
Nakasendō & Kisoji
Suhara-juku – Nojiri-juku – Midono-juku
