= Nakasendō =

One of the five routes of the Edo period (in Japan)

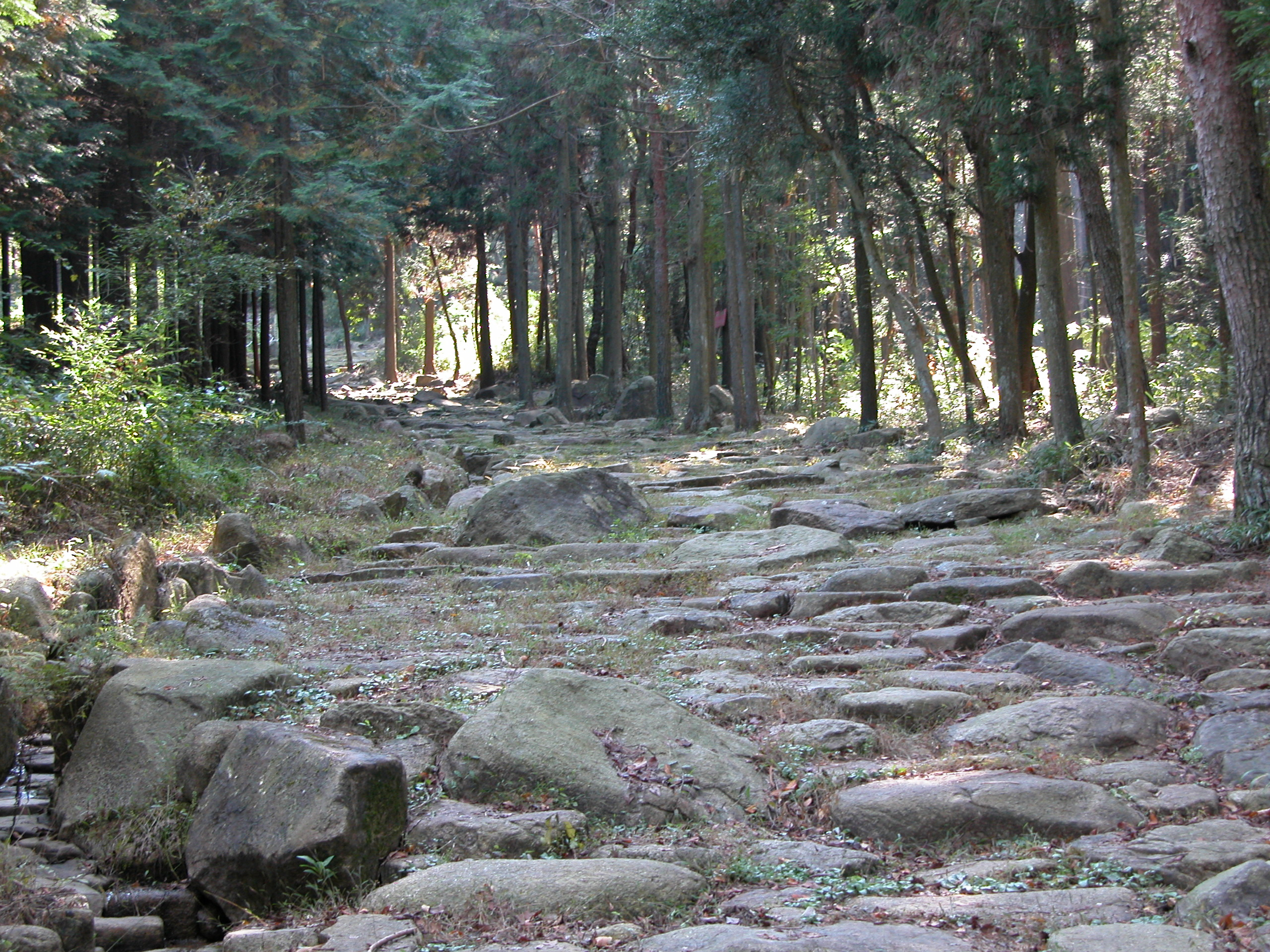
Original ishidatami (stone paving) on the Nakasendō

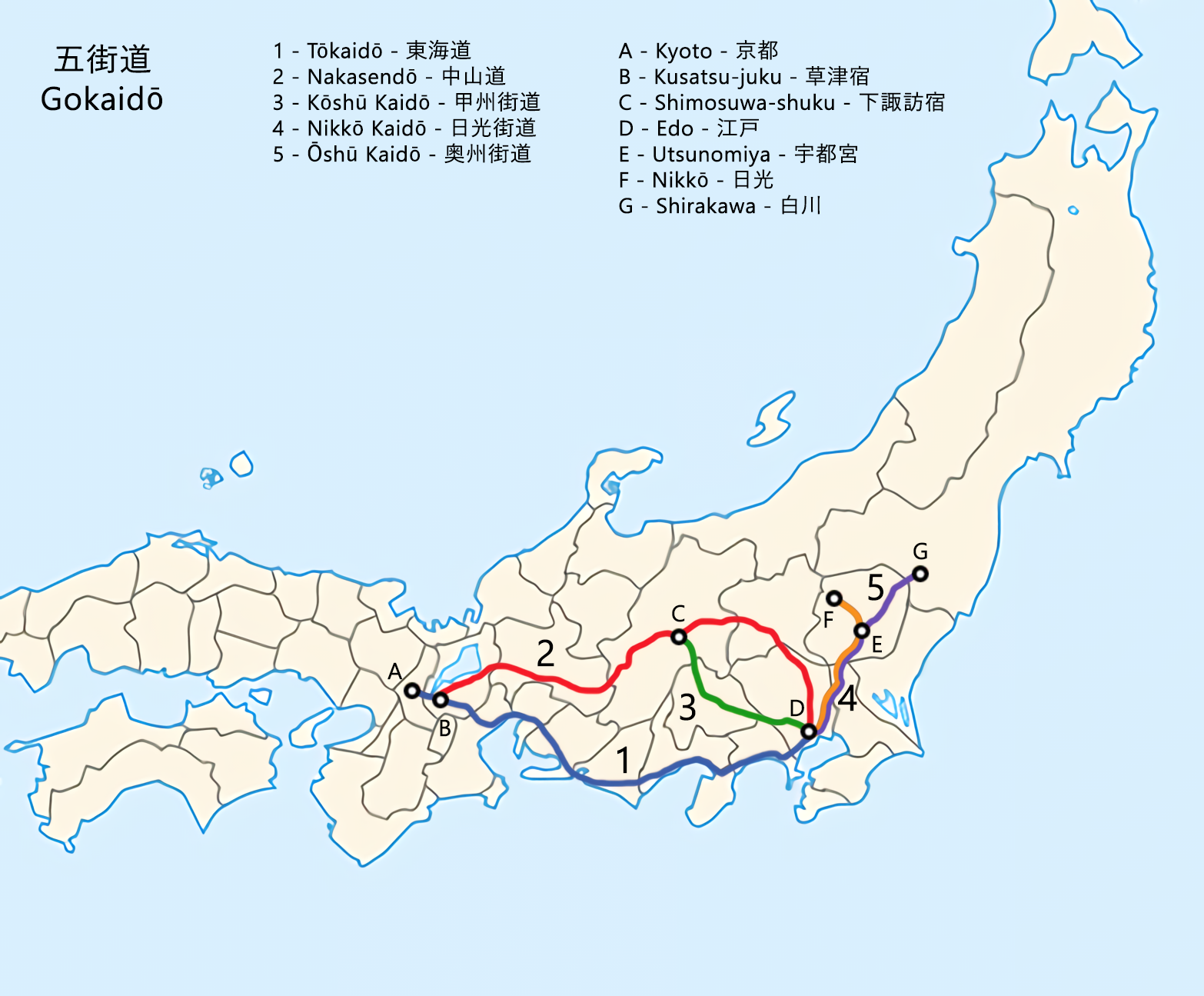
The Five Routes

The Nakasendō (中山道, Central Mountain Route), also called the Kisokaidō (木曾街道), was one of the centrally administered five routes of the Edo period, and one of the two that connected the de facto capital of Japan at Edo (modern-day Tokyo) to Kyoto. There were 69 stations (staging-posts) between Edo and Kyoto, crossing through Musashi, Kōzuke, Shinano, Mino and Ōmi provinces. In addition to Tokyo and Kyoto, the Nakasendō runs through the modern-day prefectures of Saitama, Gunma, Nagano, Gifu and Shiga, with a total distance of about 534 km (332 mi).

Unlike the coastal Tōkaidō, the Nakasendō traveled inland, hence its name, which can be translated as "中 = central; 山 = mountain; 道 = route" (as opposed to the Tōkaidō, which roughly meant "eastern sea route"). Because it was such a well-developed road, many famous persons, including the haiku master Matsuo Bashō, traveled the road. In the late 1830s Hiroshige also walked the Nakasendo, contributing 46 designs to a series of 69 views of the Nakasendo, which was later completed by Keisai Eisen.

Many people preferred traveling along the Nakasendō because it did not require travelers to ford any rivers.

In Gunma Prefecture, the Nakasendō is featured on the 'na' card in Jomo Karuta.

== Pre-Nakasendō ==
=== Ritsuryō ===
Around the beginning of the seventh century, during the beginning of Ritsuryō, the area that would eventually make up the Nakasendō was developed to connect Kinai (modern-day Kansai region, which included the former capital of Japan) with the provinces of the Tōsandō (part of the gokishichidō) that lie to the east.

=== Sengoku period ===
During the Sengoku period, which lasted from the 15th to 17th centuries, the Tōsandō was controlled by the Takeda (Kai Province), Ogasawara (Shinano Province), Kanamori (Hida Province) and Oda (Mino Province) clans. In order to connect the Tōsandō with the Tōkaidō (and Takeda's troops with Oda's), a road system was developed. This route is generally followed by the modern day national highways numbered 52, 151, 153, and 22.

== Creation of the Nakasendō ==
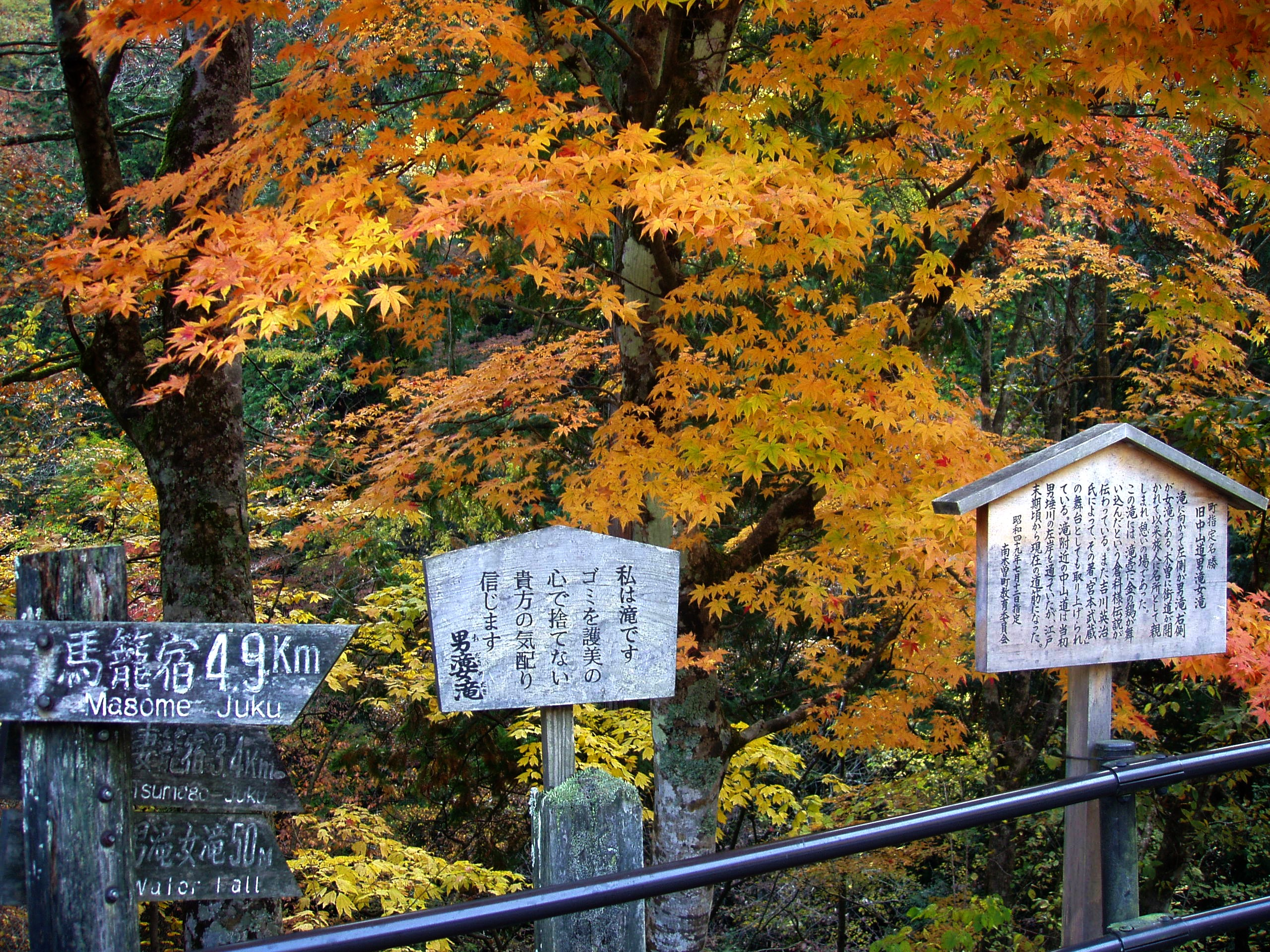
Along the Nakasendō between Tsumago and Magome.

In the early years of the Edo period, many political, legal, cultural and intellectual changes took place. Among them was the rejuvenation of Japan's thousand-year-old highway system. Five roads were formally nominated as official routes for the use of the shōgun and the other daimyō and to provide the Tokugawa shogunate with the communications network that it needed to stabilize and rule the country. One of these five roads was the Nakasendō, which stretched from Edo, from where the shogun wielded the real power, through the central mountain ranges of Honshu and on to Kyoto.

Until the establishment of these formal trade routes, many shorter routes had existed, connecting towns over various distances. For example, the Kisoji route's eleven post towns all become part of the Nakasendō (from Niekawa-juku to Magome-juku). Prior to the Edo period, the route had been called both "Sandō" (山道 "mountain route") and "Tōsandō" ("eastern mountain route"). During the Edo period, the name was changed to Nakasendō and was written as both 中山道 and 中仙道, but the Tokugawa shogunate established 中山道 as the official name in 1716.

== Today ==
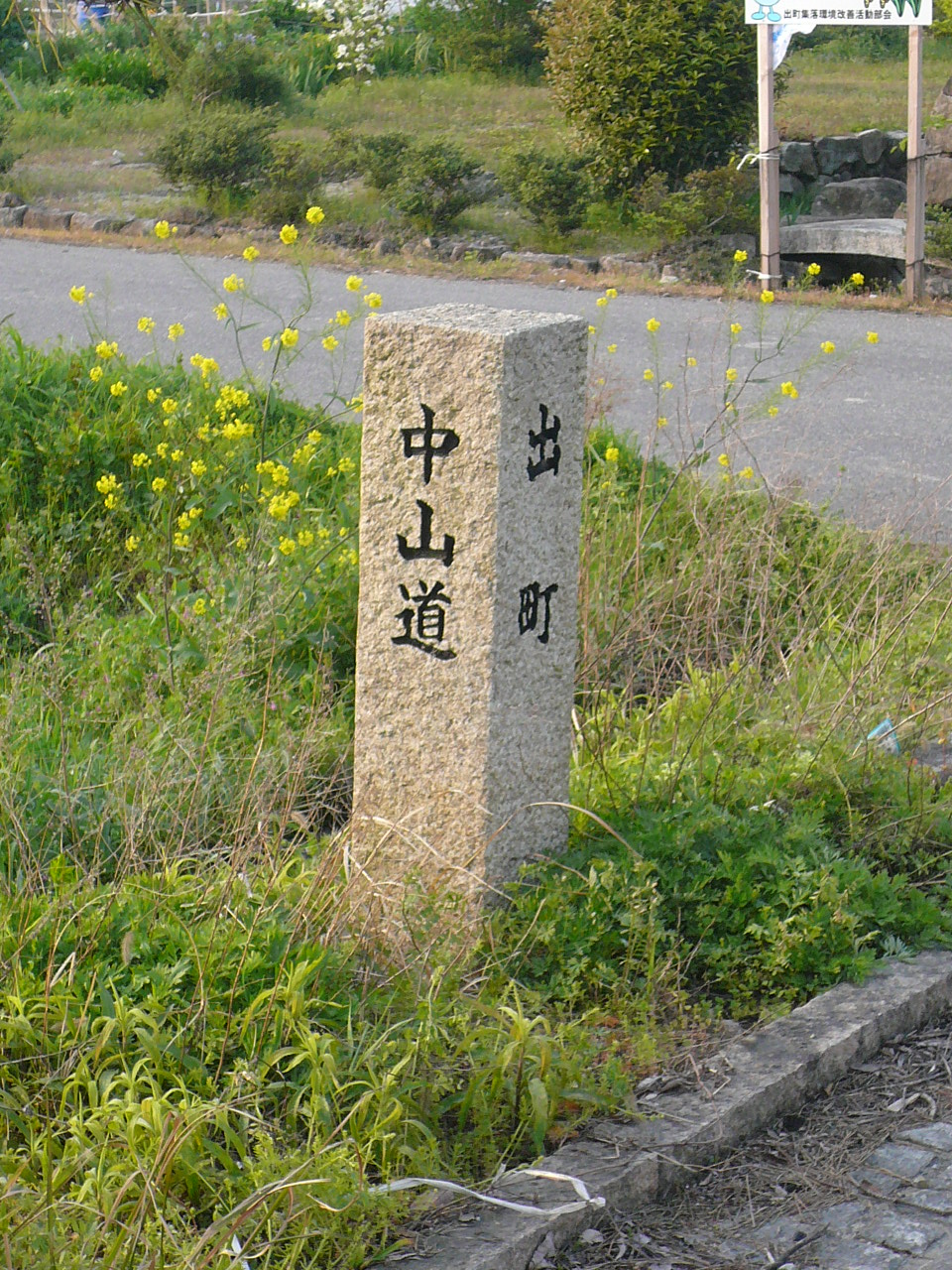
A modern-day guidepost for the Nakasendō near Takamiya-juku

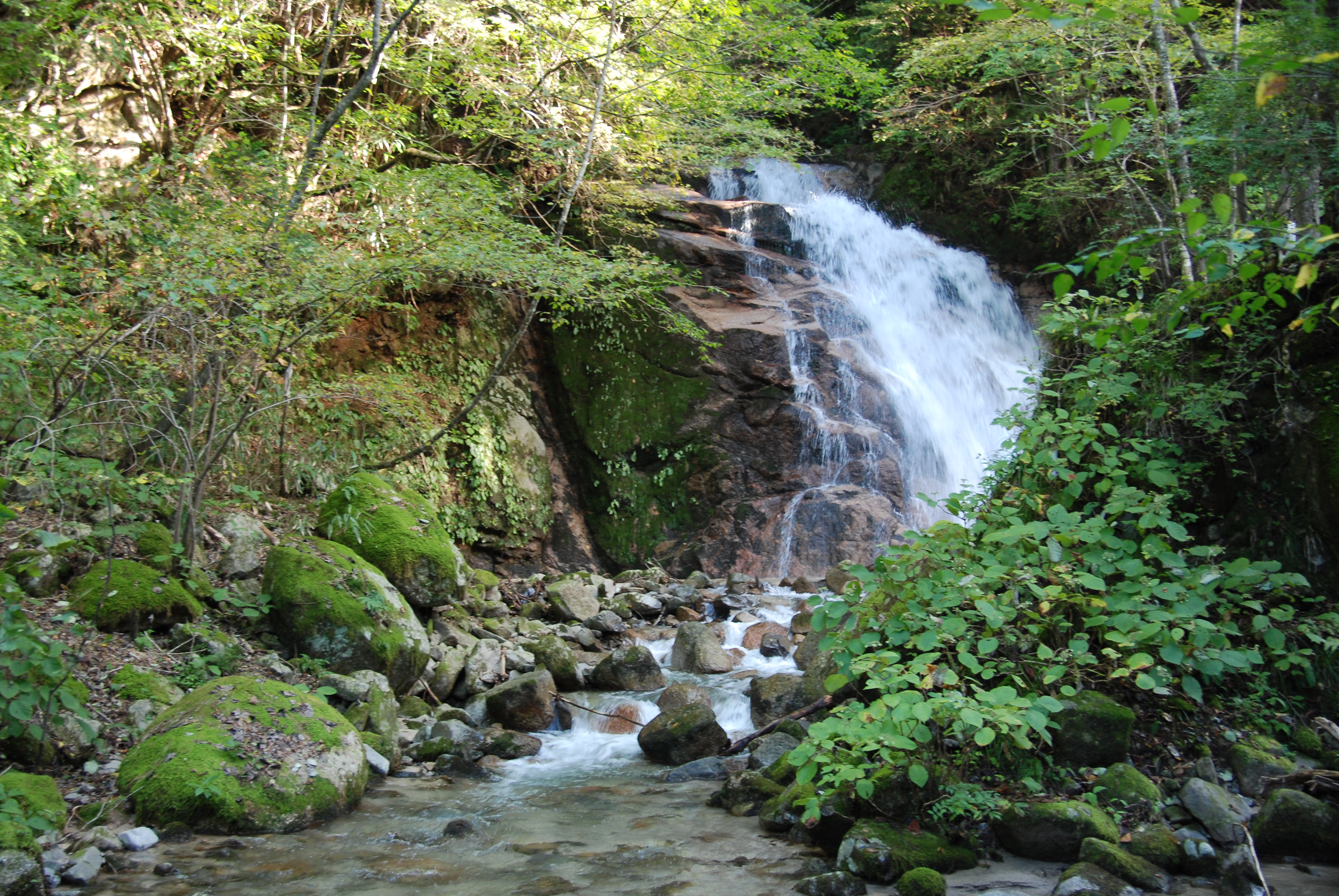
Odaki waterfall west of Tsumago-juku

Although much of the Nakasendō no longer exists in its historic form, its route is now roughly followed by modern roads. In order, they are:

- National Route 17: Tokyo to Takasaki (Gunma Prefecture)
- National Route 18: Takasaki to Karuizawa (Nagano Prefecture)
- National Route 142: Saku to Shimosuwa (Nagano Prefecture)
- National Route 20: Shimosuwa to Shiojiri (Nagano Prefecture)
- National Route 19: Shiojiri to Ena (Gifu Prefecture)
- National Route 21: Mitake (Gifu Prefecture) to Maibara (Shiga Prefecture)
- National Route 8: Maibara to Kusatsu (Shiga Prefecture)
- National Route 1: Kusatsu to Kyoto

Portions of the following railway lines approximately follow the path of the former Nakasendō:

- Takasaki Line
- Shin'etsu Main Line
- Chūō Main Line
- Taita Line
- Tōkaidō Main Line

=== National Historic Site ===
Although there has been much modern development along the Nakasendō, a few stretches remain in its original form. Three sections in Nagano Prefecture and Gifu Prefecture have been accorded National Historic Site of Japan status by the central government in 1987. These include the section between Wada-shuku and Wada Pass, the section between Shiojiri-juku and Midono-juku, and the section between Tsumago-juku and Magome-juku. The most well-known section lies in the Kiso Valley, between Tsumago-juku and Magome-juku. The area was first made famous by the early 20th-century writer Shimazaki Tōson, who chronicled the effects of the Meiji Restoration on the valley in his landmark novel Before the Dawn. This eight-kilometer section of the Nakasendō can still be travelled along comfortably by foot, and both Tsumago-juku and Magome-juku have preserved and restored the traditional architecture. The walk between the historical post towns requires two to three hours to walk, with forests, restored paving and fine views of waterfalls along the way.

== See also ==
- 69 Stations of the Nakasendō
- Kōshū Kaidō
- Ōshū Kaidō
- Nikkō Kaidō
