= Ushū Kaidō =

Edo period route

The Ushū Kaidō (羽州街道) was a subroute of the Ōshū Kaidō and the Sendaidō in Japan. It breaks off from the Sendaidō at Kōri-juku in the modern-day Koori in Fukushima Prefecture. It connects to Aburakawa-juku along Matsumaedō, the other subroute of the Ōshū Kaidō. It is traced by National Routes 13 and 7. It was established after Tokugawa Ieyasu called for the construction of routes connecting the capital of Edo (now Tokyo) with other parts of Japan.

== Stations of the Ushū Kaidō ==
The 57 post stations along the Ushū Kaidō are listed below in order and are divided by their modern-day prefecture. The present day municipality is listed afterwards in parentheses. (Actual post stations are indicated with numbers. Ai no shuku are indicated with bullets.)

=== Fukushima Prefecture ===
Starting location: Kōri-juku (桑折宿) (Koori, Date District) (also part of the Sendaidō)
1. Kosaka-juku (小坂宿) (Kunimi, Date District)

=== Miyagi Prefecture ===
2. Kamitozawa-juku (上戸沢宿) (Shiroishi)
3. Shimotozawa-juku (下戸沢宿) (Shiroishi)
4. Watarase-juku (渡瀬宿) (Shichikashuku, Katta District)
5. Seki-juku (関宿) (Shichikashuku, Katta District)
6. Nametsu-juku (滑津宿) (Shichikashuku, Katta District)
7. Tōgeta-juku (峠田宿) (Shichikashuku, Katta District)
8. Yunohara-juku (湯原宿) (Shichikashuku, Katta District)
- Hikaba-juku (干蒲宿) (Shichikashuku, Katta District)

=== Yamagata Prefecture ===
- Kanayama-juku (金山宿) (Kaminoyama)
9. Narage-juku (楢下宿) (Kaminoyama)
10. Kaminoyama-juku (上山宿) (Kaminoyama)
- Kurosawa-juku (黒沢宿) (Yamagata)
11. Matsubara-juku (松原宿) (Yamagata)
12. Yamagata-juku (山形宿) (Yamagata)
13. Tendō-juku (天童宿) (Tendō)
- Rokuta-juku (六田宿) (Higashine)
- Miyazaki-juku (宮崎宿) (Higashine)
14. Tateoka-juku (楯岡宿) (Murayama)
- Motoiida-juku (本飯田宿) (Murayama)
- Tochiuda-juku (土生田宿) (Murayama)
15. Obanazawa-juku (尾花沢宿) (Obanazawa)
16. Nakisawa-juku (名木沢宿) (Obanazawa)
17. Funagata-juku (舟形宿) (Funagata, Mogami District)
18. Shinjō-juku (新庄宿) (Shinjō)
19. Kaneyama-juku (金山宿) (Kaneyama, Mogami District)
- Nakada-juku (中田宿) (Kaneyama, Mogami District)
20. Nozoki-juku (及位宿) (Mamurogawa, Mogami District)

=== Akita Prefecture ===
21. Innai-juku (院内宿) (Yuzawa)
22. Yokobori-juku (横堀宿) (Yuzawa)
23. Yuzawa-juku (湯沢宿) (Yuzawa)
24. Yokote-juku (横手宿) (Yokote)
25. Kanezawa-juku (金沢宿) (Yokote)
26. Rokugō-juku (六郷宿) (Misato, Senboku District)
27. Ōmagari-juku (大曲宿) (Daisen)
28. Jingūji-juku (神宮寺宿) (Daisen)
29. Kariwano-juku (刈和野宿) (Daisen)
- Kamiyodokawa-juku (上淀川宿) (Daisen)
30. Sakai-juku (境宿) (Daisen)
- Wada-juku (和田宿) (Akita)
31. Toshima-juku (豊島宿) (Akita)
32. Kubota-juku (久保田宿) (Akita)
33. Tsuchizakiminato-juku (土崎湊宿) (Tsuchizaki, Akita)
34. Ōkubo-juku (大久保宿) (Katagami)
35. Abukawa-juku (虻川宿) (Katagami)
36. Ōkawa-juku (大川宿) (Gojōme, Minamiakita District)
37. Hitoichi-juku (一日市宿) (Hachirōgata, Minamiakita District)
38. Kado-juku (鹿渡宿) (Mitane, Yamamoto District)
39. Morioka-juku (森岡宿) (Mitane, Yamamoto District)
40. Toyooka-juku (豊岡宿) (Mitane, Yamamoto District)
41. Hiyama-juku (檜山宿) (Noshiro) terminus of the Ōmagoe-kaidō
42. Tsurugata-juku (鶴形宿) (Noshiro)
43. Tobine-juku (飛根宿) (Noshiro)
44. Niageba-juku (荷上場宿) (Noshiro)
45. Kotsunagi-juku (小繋宿) (Noshiro)
46. Imaizumi-juku (今泉宿) (Kitaakita)
47. Maeyama-juku (前山宿) (Kitaakita)
48. Tsuzureko-juku (綴子宿) (Kitaakita)
49. Kawaguchi-juku (川口宿) (Ōdate)
50. Ōdate-juku (大館宿) (Ōdate)
51. Shakanai-juku (釈迦内宿) (Ōdate)

=== Aomori Prefecture ===
52. Ikarigaseki-juku (碇ヶ関宿) (Hirakawa)
53. Ōwani-juku (大鰐宿) (Ōwani, Minamitsugaru District)
54. Hirosaki-juku (弘前宿) (Hirosaki)
55. Fujisaki-juku (藤崎宿) (Fujisaki, Minamitsugaru District)
56. Namioka-juku (浪岡宿) (Aomori)
57. Shinjō-juku (新城宿) (Aomori)
Ending location: Aburakawa-juku (油川宿) (Aomori) (also part of the Matsumaedō)

== National Historic Site ==
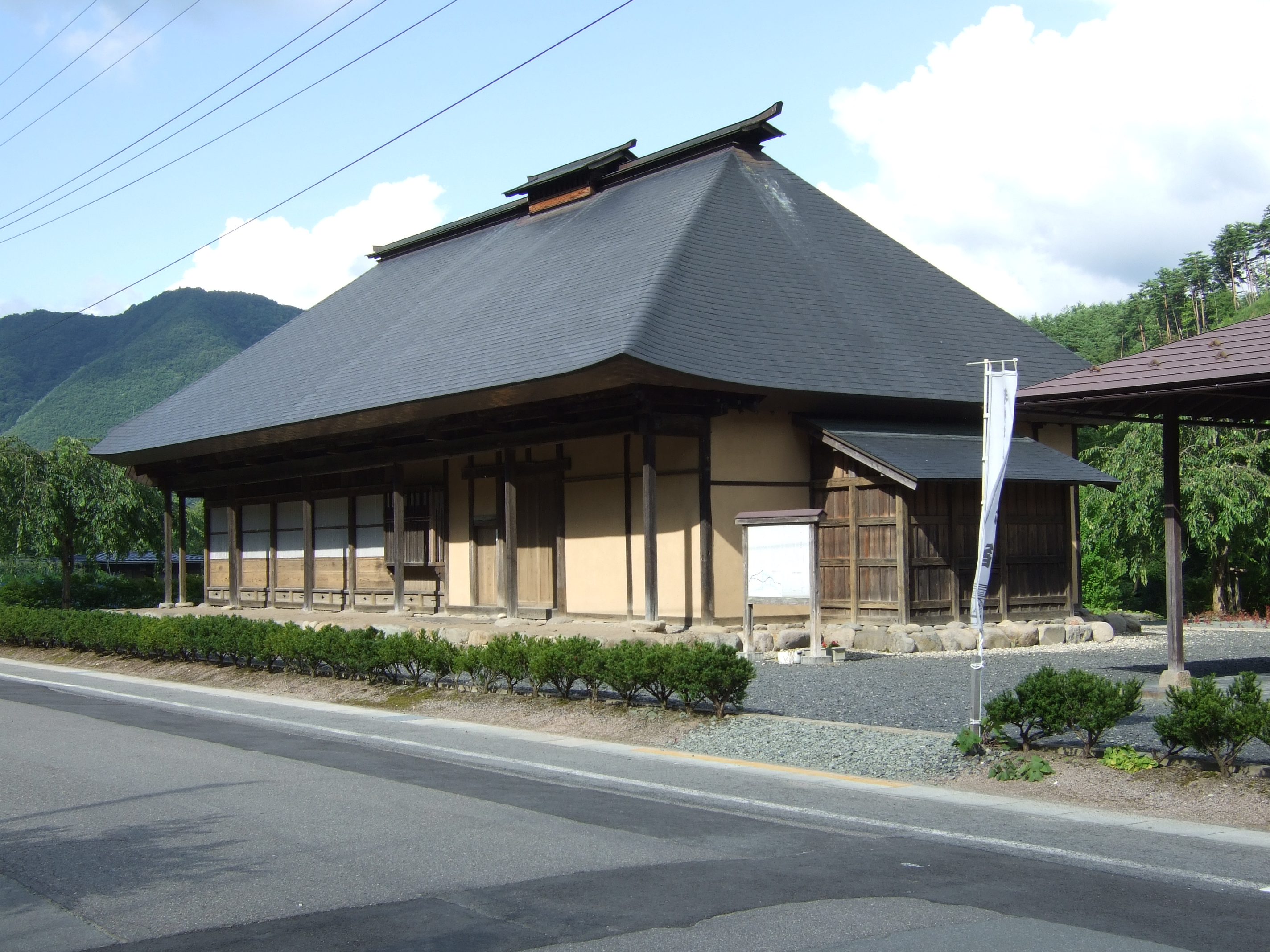
Takizawa-ya in Narage

In 1997, a well-preserved 1.9 kilometer section of the route centered on Narage-juku in the city of Kaminoyama, Yamagata and including the Kanayamagoe Pass was designated a National Historic Site of Japan. Narage-juku was the 13th post station on the route, and was often used by the sankin kōtai processions of the daimyō of the 13 feudal domains of the Ōu region en route to Edo.

== See also ==
- Edo Five Routes
- Kaidō
- List of Historic Sites of Japan (Yamagata)
