= Tanabu =

Tanabu (written: 田名部) is a Japanese surname. Notable people with the surname include:

- Masami Tanabu (1934–2025), Japanese politician and former ice hockey player and coach
- Masayo Tanabu (born 1969), Japanese politician, daughter of Masami

== See also ==
- Tanabu Kaidō, a road in the Japanese eastern Aomori Prefecture
