= Matsumaedō =

The Matsumaedō (松前道) was the continuation of the Ōshū Kaidō, one of the Edo Five Routes of Japan. It connected the Sendaidō's terminus at Sendai Castle with the northern tip of modern-day Aomori Prefecture. It was established by Tokugawa Ieyasu for government officials traveling through the area. The route is named after the Matsumae Domain, the only Edo period feudal domain to have been located in Ezo (now called Hokkaidō); Matsumae was accessible by boat from the northern terminus of the Matsumaedō.

== Travel ==
In the early Edo period, travel along the road mostly consisted of daimyō and their retainers heading to-and-from Edo under their sankin kōtai obligations. After Hakodate's development, the late Edo period saw travel further increase as a result of increasing trade with Imperial Russia.

Today, the path of the Ōshū Kaidō is followed by National Route 4, which runs parallel to the Tōhoku Expressway and the Hachinohe Expressway.

== Stations of the Matsumaedō ==
The 44 post stations along the Matsumaedō are listed below in order and are divided by their modern-day prefecture. The present day municipality is listed afterwards in parentheses. The Sendaidō connected the beginning of the Matsumaedō with the end of the Ōshū Kaidō.

=== Miyagi Prefecture ===
Starting Location: Sendai Castle (Aoba-ku, Sendai)
1. Nanakita-juku (七北田宿) (Izumi-ku, Sendai)
2. Tomiya-juku (富谷宿) (Tomiya, Kurokawa District)
3. Yoshioka-juku (吉岡宿) (Taiwa, Kurokawa District)
4. Sanbongi-juku (三本木宿) (Ōsaki)
5. Furukawa-juku (古川宿) (Ōsaki)
6. Araya-juku (荒谷宿) (Ōsaki)
7. Takashimizu-juku (高清水宿) (Kurihara)
8. Tsukidate-juku (築館宿) (Kurihara)
9. Miyano-juku (宮野宿) (Kurihara)
10. Sawabe-juku (沢辺宿) (Kurihara)
11. Kannari-juku (金成宿) (Kurihara)
12. Arikabe-juku (有壁宿) (Kurihara)

=== Iwate Prefecture ===
13. Ichinoseki-juku (一関宿) (Ichinoseki)
14. Yamanome-juku (山目宿) (Ichinoseki)
15. Hiraizumi-juku (平泉宿) (Hiraizumi, Nishiiwai District)
16. Maesawa-juku (前沢宿) (Ōshū)
17. Mizusawa-juku (水沢宿) (Ōshū)
18. Kanegasaki-juku (金ヶ崎宿) (Kanegasaki, Isawa District)
19. Aisari-juku (相去宿) (Kitakami)
- Kurosawajiri-juku (黒沢尻宿) (Kitakami) (ai no shuku)
20. Hanamaki-juku (花巻宿) (Hanamaki)
21. Ishidoriya-juku (石鳥谷宿) (Hanamaki)
22. Hizumekōriyama-juku (日詰郡山宿) (Shiwa, Shiwa District)
23. Morioka Castle (盛岡城) (Morioka)
24. Shibutami-juku (渋民宿) (Morioka)
25. Numakunai-juku (沼宮内宿) (Iwate, Iwate District)
26. Ichinohe-juku (一戸宿) (Ichinohe, Ninohe District)
27. Fukuoka-juku (福岡宿) (Ninohe)
28. Kindaichi-juku (金田一宿) (Ninohe)

=== Aomori Prefecture ===
29. Sannohe-juku (三戸宿) (Sannohe, Sannohe District)
30. Gonohe-juku (五戸宿) (Gonohe, Sannohe District)
31. Denbōji-juku (伝法寺宿) (Towada)
32. Fujishima-juku (藤島宿) (Towada)
33. Shichinohe-juku (七戸宿) (Shichinohe, Kamikita District)
34. Noheji-juku (野辺地宿) (Noheji, Kamikita District) terminus of the Tanabu Kaidō
35. Makado-juku (馬門宿) (Noheji, Kamikita District)
36. Kominato-juku (小湊宿) (Hiranai, Higashitsugaru District)
37. Nonai-juku (野内宿) (Aomori)
38. Aomori-juku (青森宿) (Aomori)
39. Aburakawa-juku (油川宿) (Aomori) (also part of the Ushū Kaidō)
40. Yomogita-juku (蓬田宿) (Yomogita, Higashitsugaru District)
41. Kanita-juku (蟹田宿) (Sotogahama, Higashitsugaru District)
42. Tairadate-juku (平舘宿) (Sotogahama, Higashitsugaru District)
43. Imabetsu-juku (今別宿) (Imabetsu, Higashitsugaru District)
44. Minmaya-juku (三厩宿) (Sotogahama, Higashitsugaru District)
Ending Location: Tappisaki (竜飛崎) (Minmaya, Higashitsugaru District)

== National Historic Site ==
In the year 2010, seven surviving portions of the highway with a total length of 8.86 kilometers in the towns of Ichinohe, Iwate and Iwate, Iwate received protection as a National Historic Site of Japan. These surviving sections contain four of the original ichirizuka milestones of the highway.

== See also ==
- Edo Five Routes
- Kaidō
