= Tateshina =

Tateshina may refer to

- Tateshina, Nagano a town in Japan
- Mount Tateshina, a volcano in Japan
- 11149 Tateshina, a minor planet named after the volcano
