= Sendaidō =

The Sendaidō (仙台道) was a subroute of the Ōshū Kaidō, one of the Edo Five Routes of Japan. It connected the Ōshū Kaidō's terminus in Shirakawa and Mutsu Province with Sendai. It was established by Tokugawa Ieyasu for government officials traveling through the area.

== Stations of the Sendaidō ==
The 41 post stations along the Sendaidō are listed below in order and are divided by their modern-day prefecture. The present day municipality is listed afterwards in parentheses. The Matsumaedō connects the end of the Sendaidō with the northern tip of modern-day Aomori Prefecture.

=== Fukushima Prefecture ===
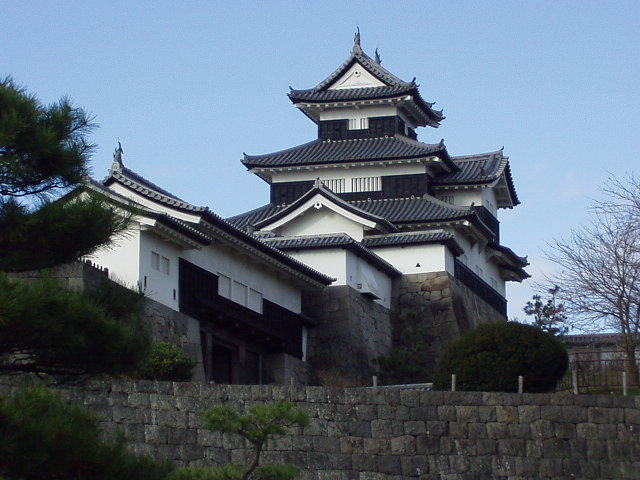
Shirakawa Castle

Starting Location: Shirakawa Castle (白河城) (Shirakawa)
1. Neda-juku (根田宿) (Shirakawa)
2. Kotagawa-juku (小田川宿) (Shirakawa)
3. Ōtagawa-juku (太田川宿) (Izumizaki, Nishishirakawa District)
4. Fumase-juku (踏瀬宿) (Izumizaki, Nishishirakawa District)
5. Yamatoku-juku (大和久宿) (Yabuki, Nishishirakawa District)
6. Nakahatashinden-juku (中畑新田宿) (Yabuki, Nishishirakawa District)
7. Yabuki-juku (矢吹宿) (Yabuki, Nishishirakawa District)
8. Kyūraishi-juku (久来石宿) (Kagamiishi, Iwase District)
9. Kasaishi-juku (笠石宿) (Kagamiishi, Iwase District)
10. Sukagawa-juku (須賀川宿) (Sukagawa)
11. Sasagawa-juku (笹川宿) (Kōriyama)
12. Hinodeyama-juku (日出山宿) (Kōriyama)
13. Koharada-juku (小原田宿) (Kōriyama)
14. Kōriyama-juku (郡山宿) (Kōriyama)
15. Fukuhara-juku (福原宿) (Kōriyama)
16. Hiwada-juku (日和田宿) (Kōriyama)
17. Takakura-juku (高倉宿) (Kōriyama)
18. Motomiya-juku (本宮宿) (Motomiya)

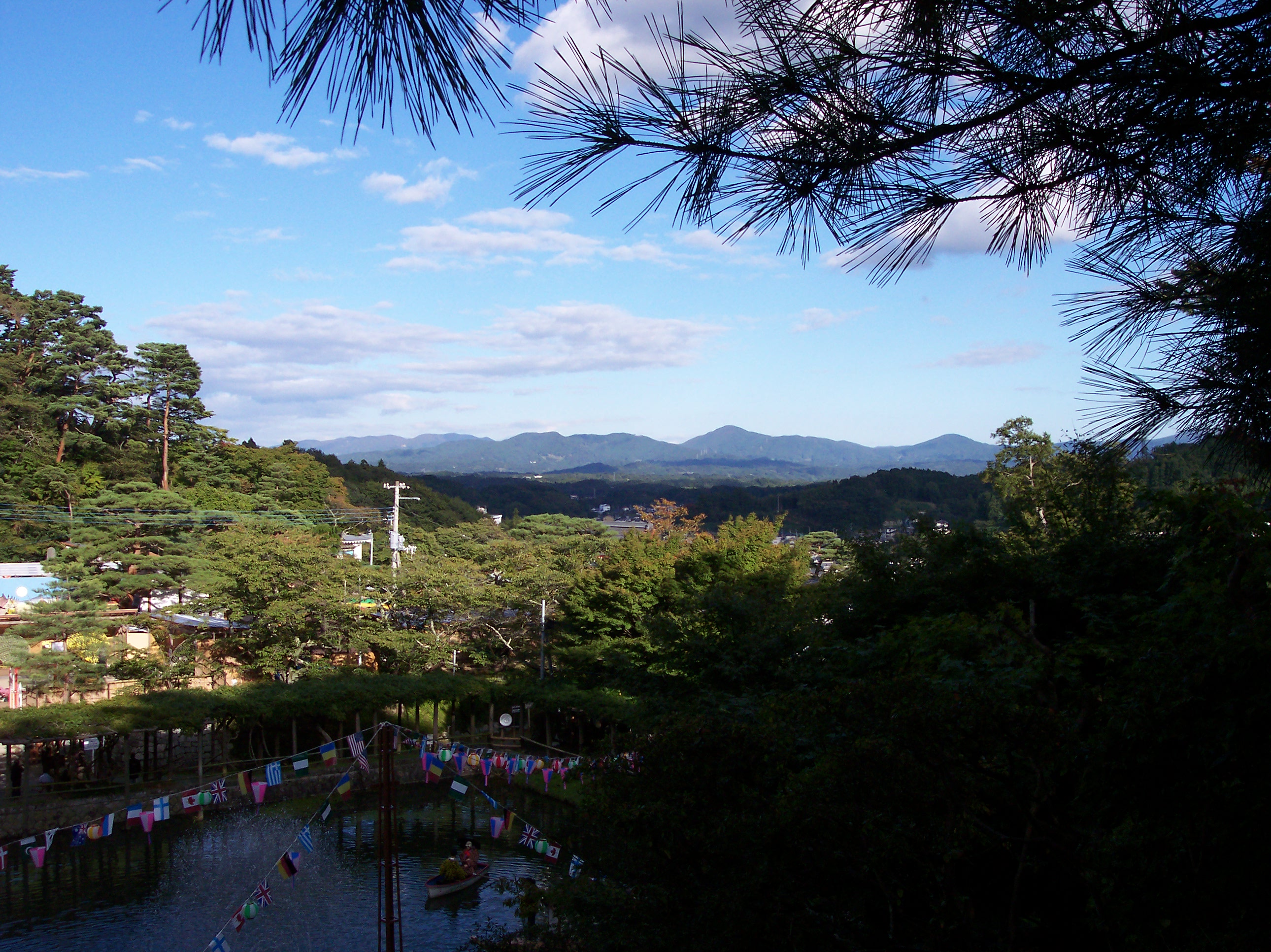
Nihonmatsu

19. Minamisugita-juku (南杉田宿) (Nihonmatsu)
20. Kitasugita-juku (北杉田宿) (Nihonmatsu)
21. Nihonmatsu-juku (二本松宿) (Nihonmatsu)
22. Nihonyanagi-juku (二本柳宿) (Nihonmatsu)
23. Hatchōme-juku (八丁目宿) (Fukushima)
- Asakawashinden-juku(浅川新町宿) (Fukushima) (ai no shuku)
24. Shimizuchō-juku (清水町宿) (Fukushima)
25. Fukushima-juku (福島宿) (Fukushima)
26. Senoue-juku (瀬上宿) (Fukushima)
27. Kōri-juku (桑折宿) (Koori, Date District) (also part of the Ushū Kaidō)
28. Fujita-juku (藤田宿) (Kunimi, Date District)
29. Kaida-juku (貝田宿) (Kunimi, Date District)

=== Miyagi Prefecture ===
30. Kosugō-juku (越河宿) (Shiroishi)
31. Saikawa-juku (斎川宿) (Shiroishi)
32. Shiroishi Castle (白石城) (Shiroishi)
33. Miya-juku (宮宿) (Zaō, Katta District)
34. Kanagase-juku (金ヶ瀬宿) (Ōgawara, Shibata District)
35. Ōgawara-juku (大河原宿) (Ōgawara, Shibata District)
36. Funabasama-juku (船迫宿) (Shibata, Shibata District)
37. Tsukinoki-juku (槻木宿) (Shibata, Shibata District)
38. Iwanuma-juku (岩沼宿) (Iwanuma)
39. Masuda-juku (増田宿) (Natori)
40. Nakada-juku (中田宿) (Taihaku-ku, Sendai)
41. Nagamachi-juku (長町宿) (Taihaku-ku, Sendai)
Ending Location: Sendai Castle (Aoba-ku, Sendai)

== See also ==
- Edo Five Routes
- Kaidō
