= Nagakubo-shuku =

Coordinates: 36.2538°N 138.2675°E

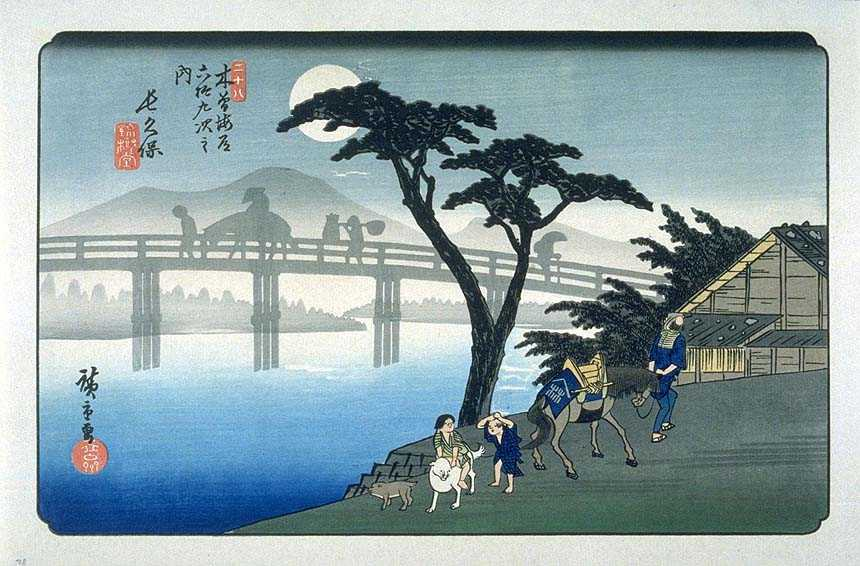
Hiroshige's print of Nagakubo-shuku, part of The Sixty-nine Stations of the Kiso Kaidō series. The title of this print is "Man on Horseback Crossing a Bridge." It is the Wada Bridge across the Yoda River.

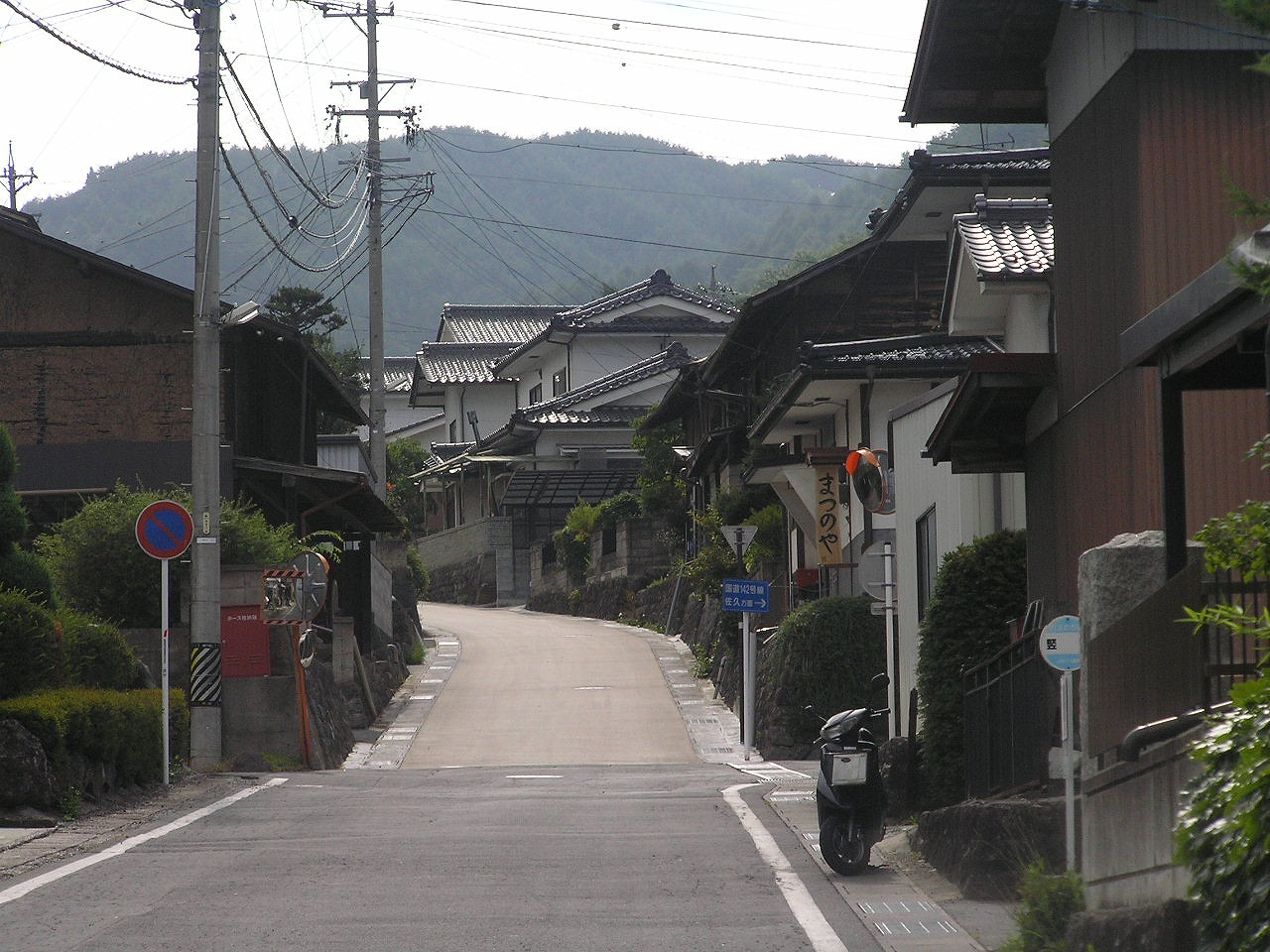
modern-day Nagakubo-shuku

Nagakubo-shuku (長久保宿, Nagakubo-shuku) was the twenty-sixth of the sixty-nine stations of the Nakasendō highway connecting Edo with Kyoto during the Edo period. It is located in the present-day town of Nagawa, in the Chiisagata District of Nagano Prefecture, Japan.

== History ==
Located between the Wada Pass and the Kasadori Pass, two difficult parts along the Nakasendō, Nagakubo flourished as a post town under the Tokugawa shogunate. Much of the original town was destroyed by a flood in 1631, and relocated a slight distance to higher ground. As the town developed, its row houses eventually spread to side streets, giving it the rare shape of a key. It is located approximately six kilometers from Ashida-shuku.

Per an 1843 guidebook issued by the Inspector of Highways (道中奉行, Dōchu-būgyō), there were over 187 inns in which travelers could rest, including one honjin, one waki-honjin, and 43 hatago, with a total resident population of 721 people.

Many of the buildings of Nagakubo-shuku have been preserved, and the area is a tourist attraction within the town of Nagawa.

== Nagakubo-shuku in The Sixty-nine Stations of the Kiso Kaidō ==
Hiroshige's ukiyo-e print of Nagakubo-shuku dates from 1835 to 1838. The scene depicts the Wada bridge, located just past the post station. In the front of the picture, two children are playing and a traveler is leading his packhorse towards an inn. As was common in the series of prints, the publisher's name appears on the saddlecloth on the horse. The roof of the inn is shown with stones on the tiles to help secure the roof against strong winds - this was a typical method of construction for the region.

== Neighboring post towns ==
Nakasendō
Ashida-shuku - Nagakubo-shuku - Wada-shuku
