= Shinkanō-juku =

Pre-modern Japan post-station along highway

Shinkanō-juku (新加納宿, Shinkanō-juku) was a mid-station along the Nakasendō in Edo period Japan. It was in between the post stations of Unuma-juku and Kanō-juku. It is located in the present-day town of Kakamigahara, Gifu Prefecture, Japan.

== Neighboring post towns ==
Nakasendō
Unuma-juku - Shinkanō-shuku - Kanō-juku
