= Lake Megami =

Lake in Japan

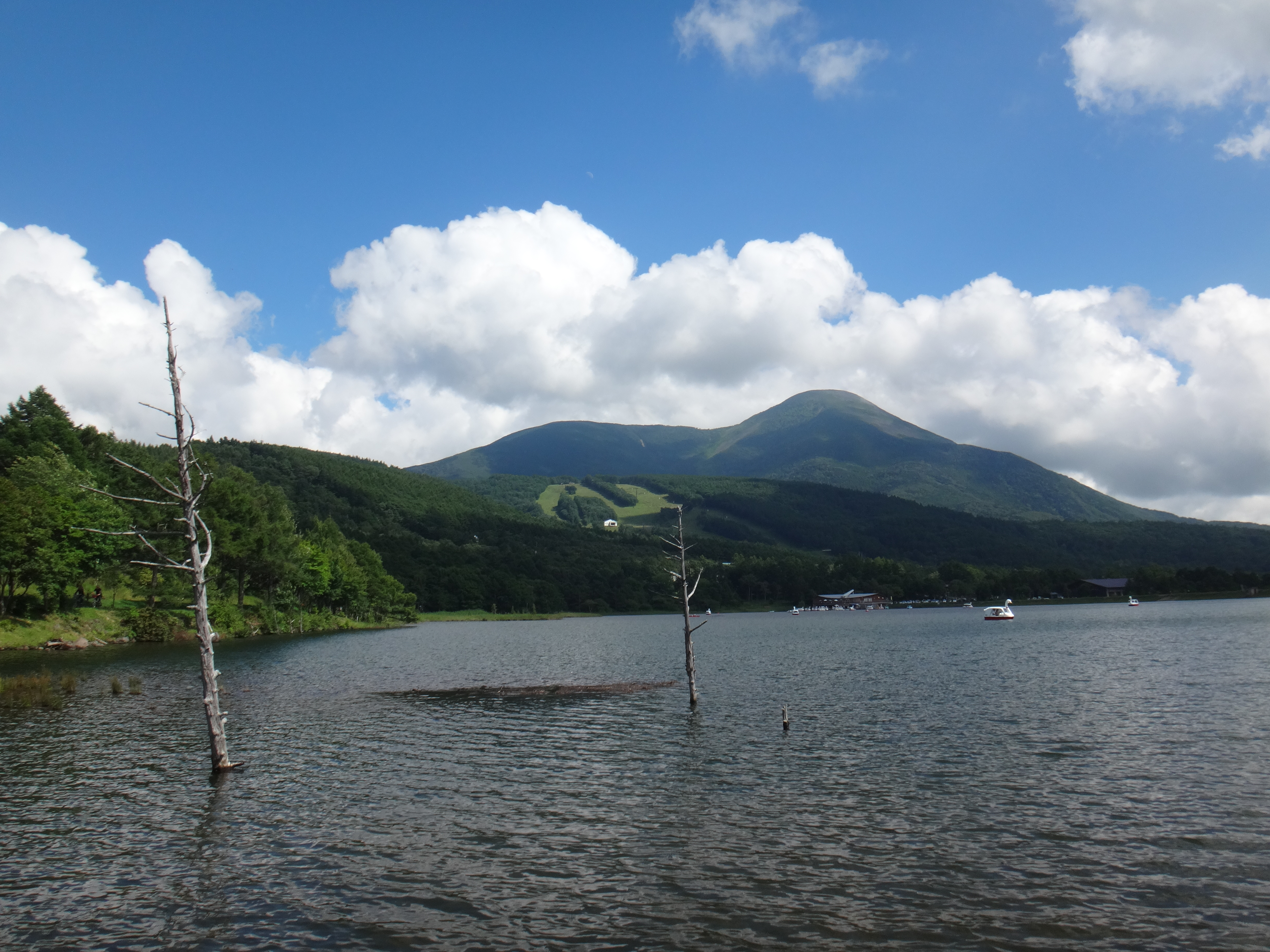
- Mt.Tateshina from Lake Megami

- Location within Nagano Prefecture
- Coordinates: 36°08′12″N 138°16′06″E
- Surface area: 12 ha (30 acres)
- Average depth: 4 m (13 ft)
- Water volume: 320,000 m^{3} (260 acre⋅ft)
- Shore length^{1}: 1.5 km (0.93 mi)
- Surface elevation: 1,540 m (5,050 ft)
- ^{1} Shore length is not a well-defined measure.

Megami Lake (Japanese: 女神湖, Hepburn: Megami-ko) is a lake located in Tateshina, Nagano Prefecture. An artificial lake constructed for agricultural purposes, it is also known as Akanuma Reservoir. A development to make it into a resort site is also underway. It is in Yatsugatake-Chūshin Kōgen Quasi-National Park.

== Geography ==
The lake is positioned about four kilometres to the northwest of Mount Tateshina. The lake's surface is 1540 metres above sea level, has a surface area of 0.12 square kilometres, a circumference of 1.5 kilometres and an average depth of 4 metres.

In 1966, the warm water reservoir was completed on the site of a wetland called Akanuma. It was constructed as part of a plan to improve an agricultural irrigation channel from the Edo period. Holding 320, 000 cubic metres, it provides water to 1537.3 hectares of farmland downstream. As Mount Tateshina is sometimes known as Menokami-yama ('Goddess mountain'), the lake was named Megami-ko ('Goddess lake') after it.

The Venus Line road opened in 1967 and connected the lake to Lake Shirakaba, which was a more established tourist destination. Seizing the opportunity, Tateshina then got a licence to use the surface of the lake and further developed the lake as a tourist attraction, building several accommodation and leisure facilities, In the area around the lake there natural woods of Japanese white birch and Japanese larch, and in spring and early summer one can see eastern skunk cabbage and Japanese azalea at their peaks, respectively. Boats can be seen on the lake in summer, and in August the Shirakaba Kōgen Firework Display is held. The red leaves of autumn have also been praised for their beauty. In winter, the frozen lake surface is turned into a race track, which is used to hold courses in road safety as well as to test drive cars in development.

With the help of English literature scholar Kimie Imura, the Lake Megami Fairy Festival has been held since 2010. The area's abundant nature is said to be popular with the fairies spoken of in European folklore, and the event is held to coincide with periods when fairies are supposedly close to the human world (in the fiscal year of 2011, it was held in May, June, October and February). It was conceived as a plan to revitalise the area, and by making fairies the theme it has a high degree of originality and newsworthiness. As well as this, the event takes place between the summer and winter tourist seasons, with an aim to increase visitor numbers in that period.

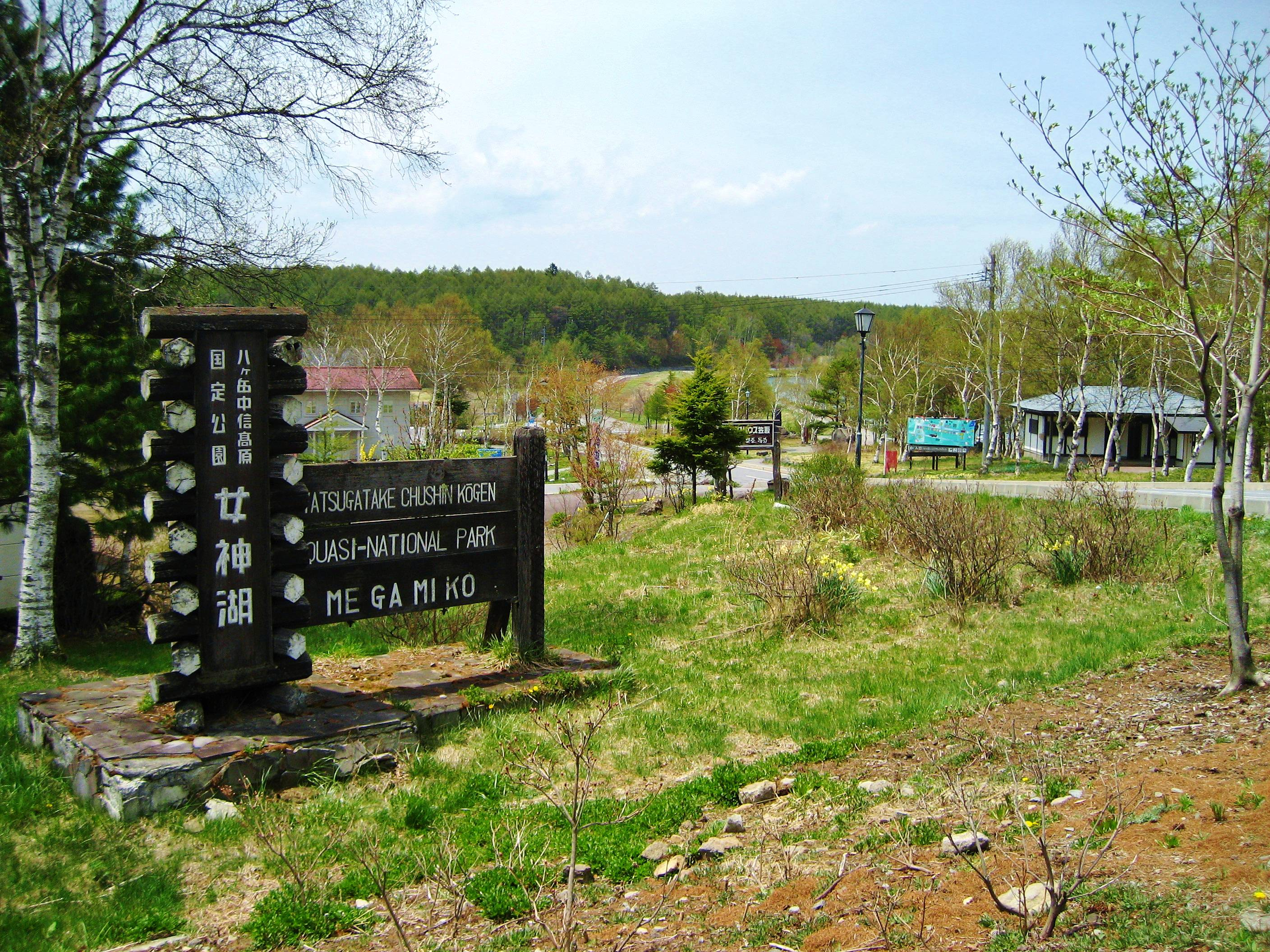
Entrance to Lake Megami

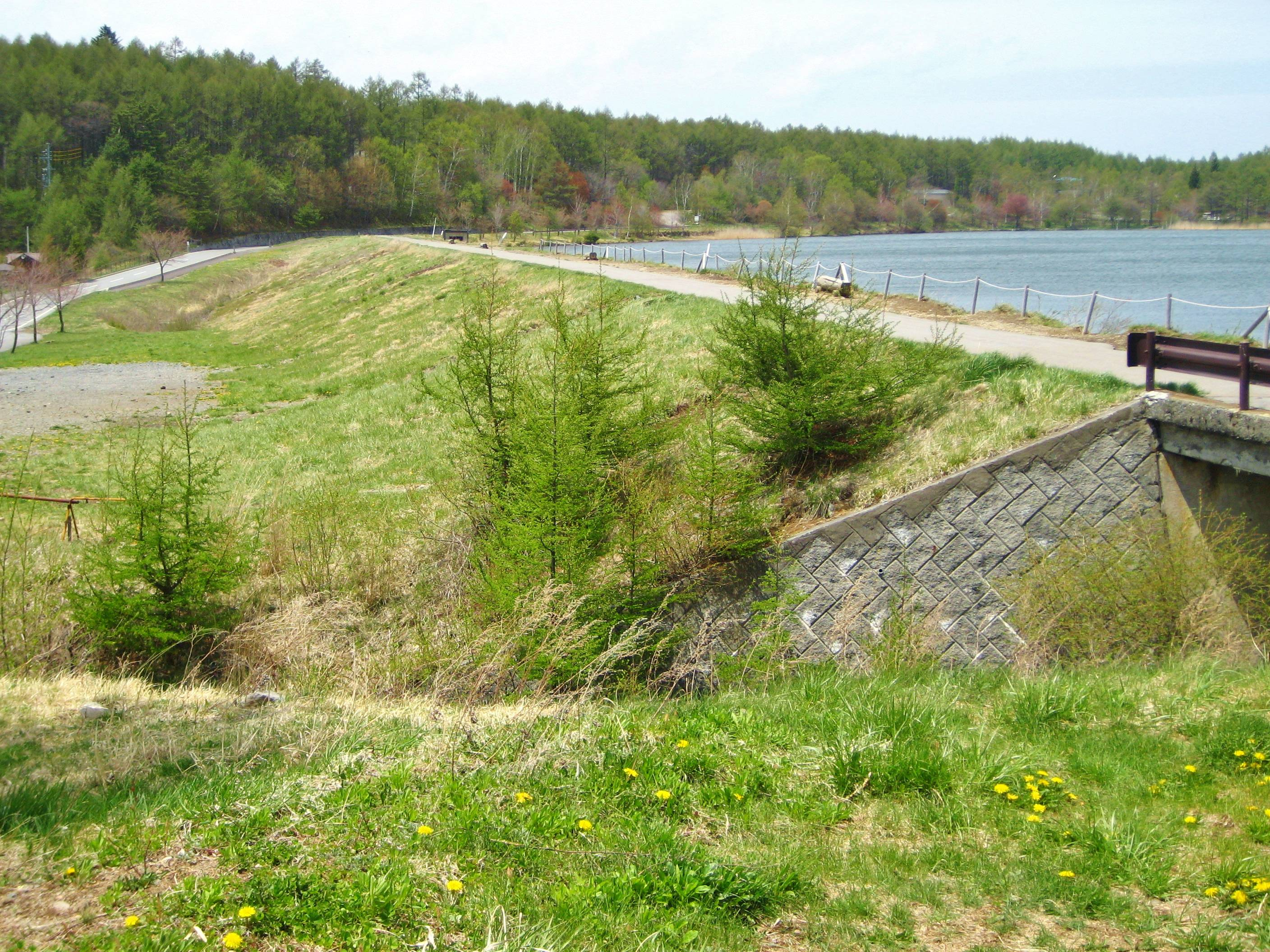
Dam at Lake Megami

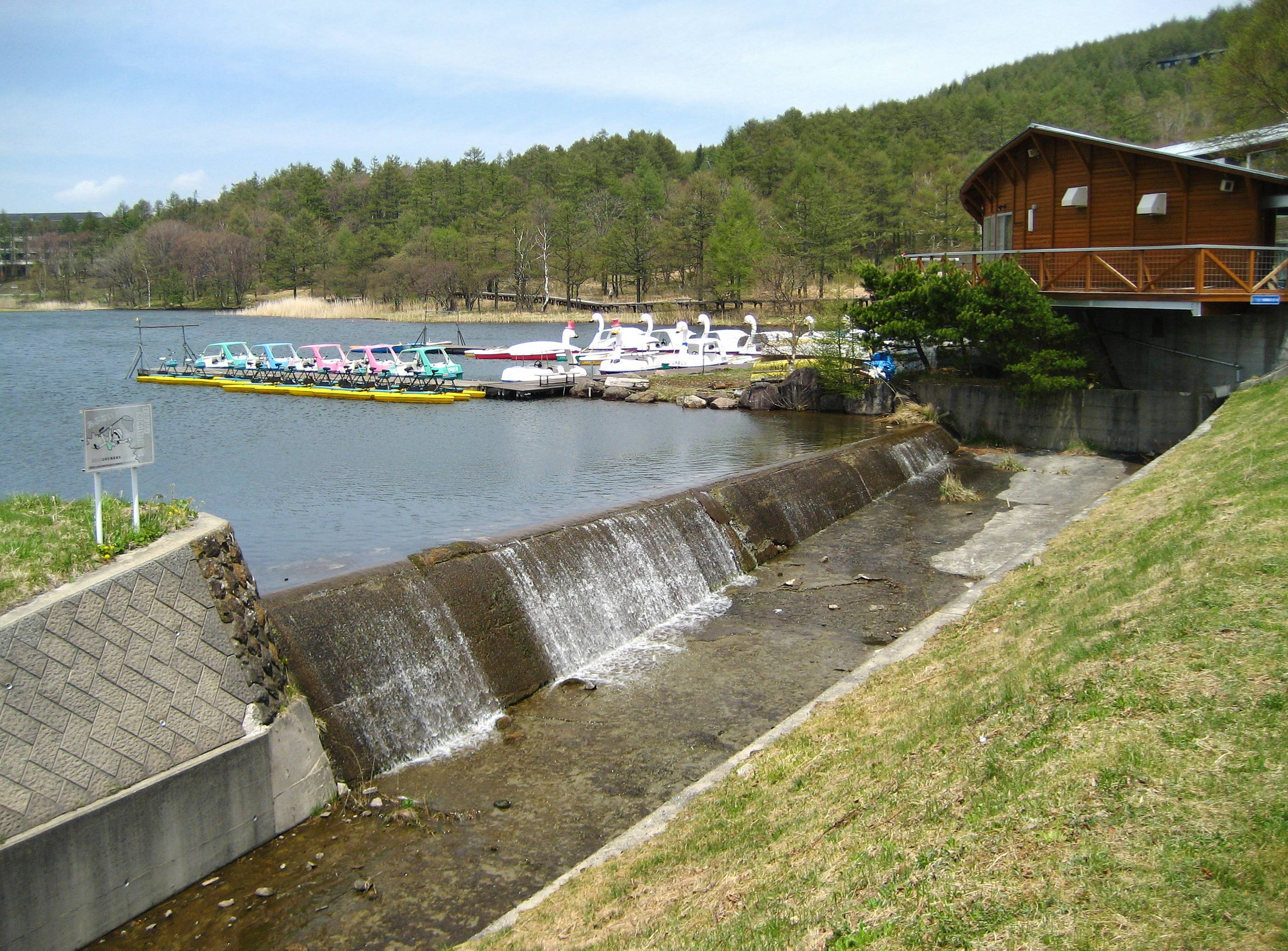
Spillway at Lake Megami

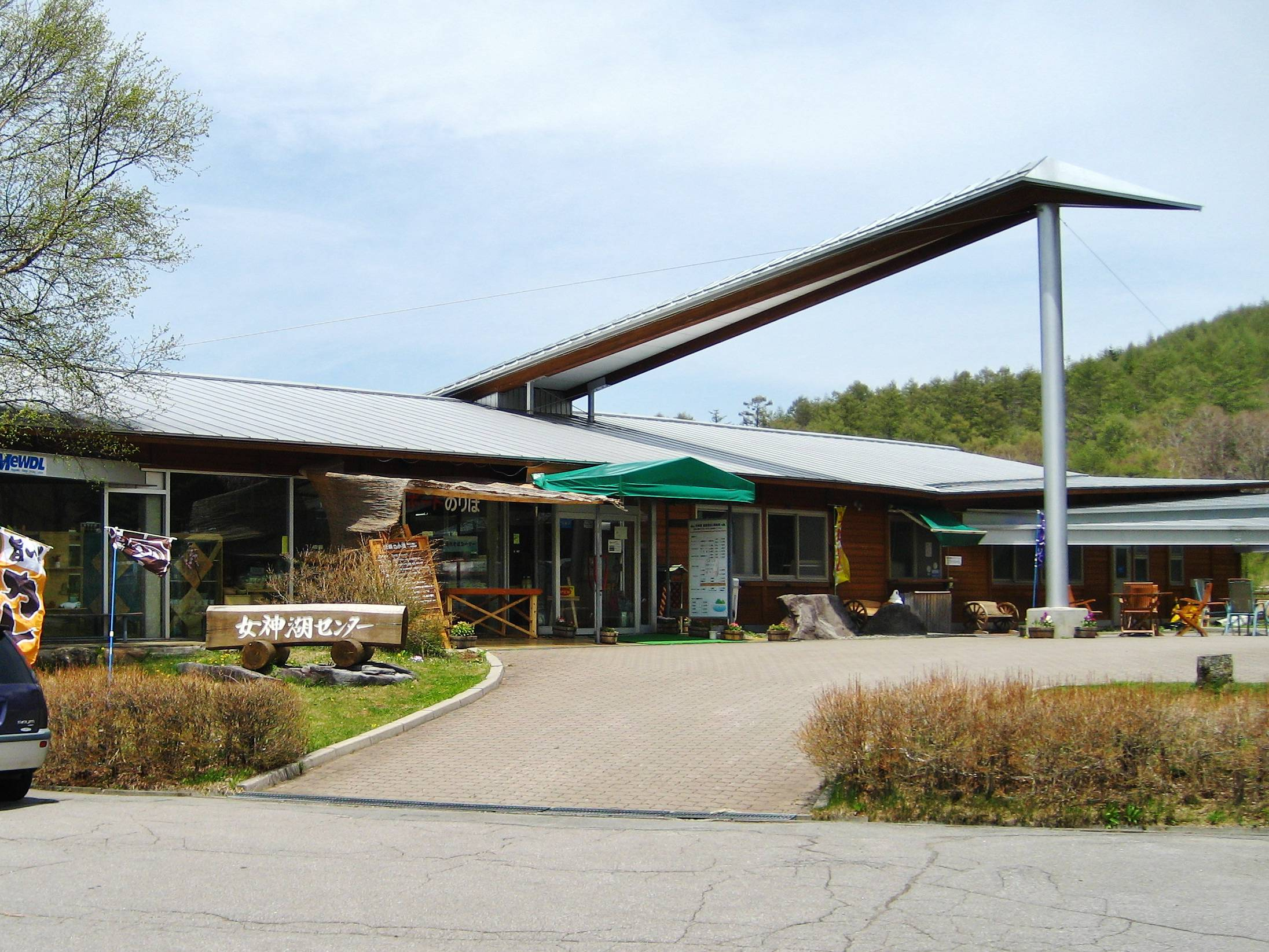
Lake Megami Centre

== Shiozawa-segi ==
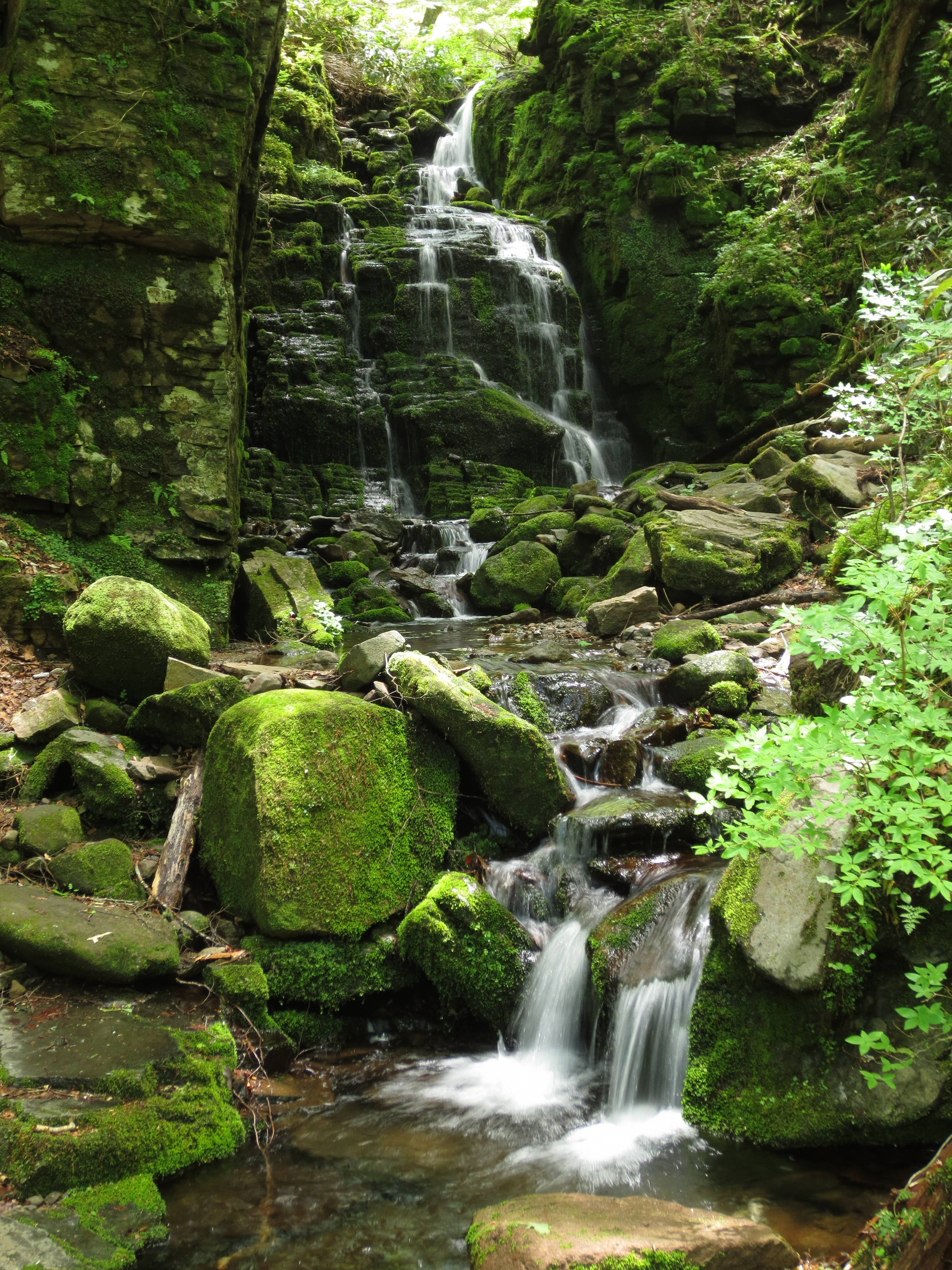
Ryōsen Falls in Gosensui Natural Garden. Its source is in Mizuide.

Shiozawa-segi (Japanese: 塩沢堰) is an irrigation channel that flows through Tateshina. Along with Uyama-segi and Yaebara-segi, it is considered one of the three major irrigation channels of Tateshina. It is also registered on the Sosui Hyakusen, a list of the best one hundred in Japan.

It was originally built by Rokugawa Chōsaburō, work began in 1644 and finished in 1646. Its sources are located in the mountains, at Benzaiten (1680 metres above sea level) and Mizuide (1660 metres above sea level) amongst others. Before this time the feudal domain had a kokudaka of a little over fifty koku, but after the completion of Shiozawa-segi this increased rapidly. In 1672 it had reached as much as 662 koku. Rokugawa Chōsaburō's name, along with his great power, was passed down for many generations. The family was responsible for maintaining and managing the irrigation channel, controlling the amount of water supplied.

Lake Megami was constructed with the objective of storing excess water from Shiozawa-segi to make up for water shortages. Construction began in April 1942 to improve the water supply for agriculture in the six villages of Ashida, Yokotori, Mitsuwa, Motomaki, Kitamaki and Shiokawa (present day Tateshina, Saku, Tōmi and Ueda). Pupils from Tateshina Agricultural School (now Tateshina High School) were mobilised to work on it. From 1946, construction went ahead under the authorisation of the Supreme Commander for the Allied Powers, but due to a lack of materials and food, construction was suspended in 1949.

In 1961, work began on the Prefectural Mimakihara Agricultural Water Supply Improvement Project. The work of upgrading to the current method of supplying water from Araido Weir that comes from each water source started. Adding to the practical use of an already existing irrigation channel, a new tunnel was dug up and maintenance of the main waterway was promoted. Work on suspended Lake Megami project resumed, and while construction was delayed due to difficult terrain, it was completed in 1966. The whole of the Prefectural Mimakihara Agricultural Water Supply Improvement Project was finished in 1976. The construction cost totalled 1.4 billion yen. There were also plans for a hydroelectric power station, but they were not implemented.

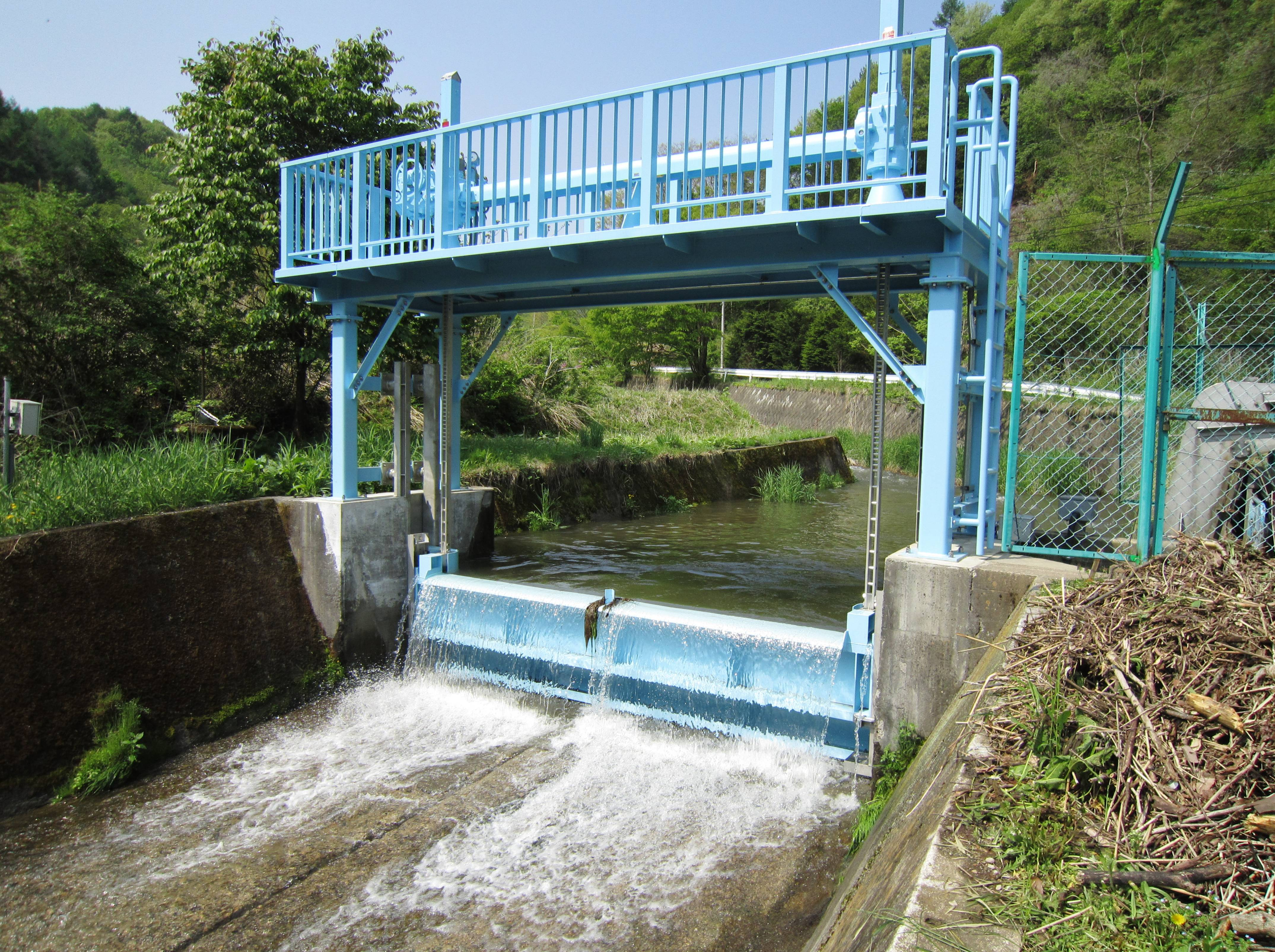
Araido Weir as it stands today (taken in 2010)

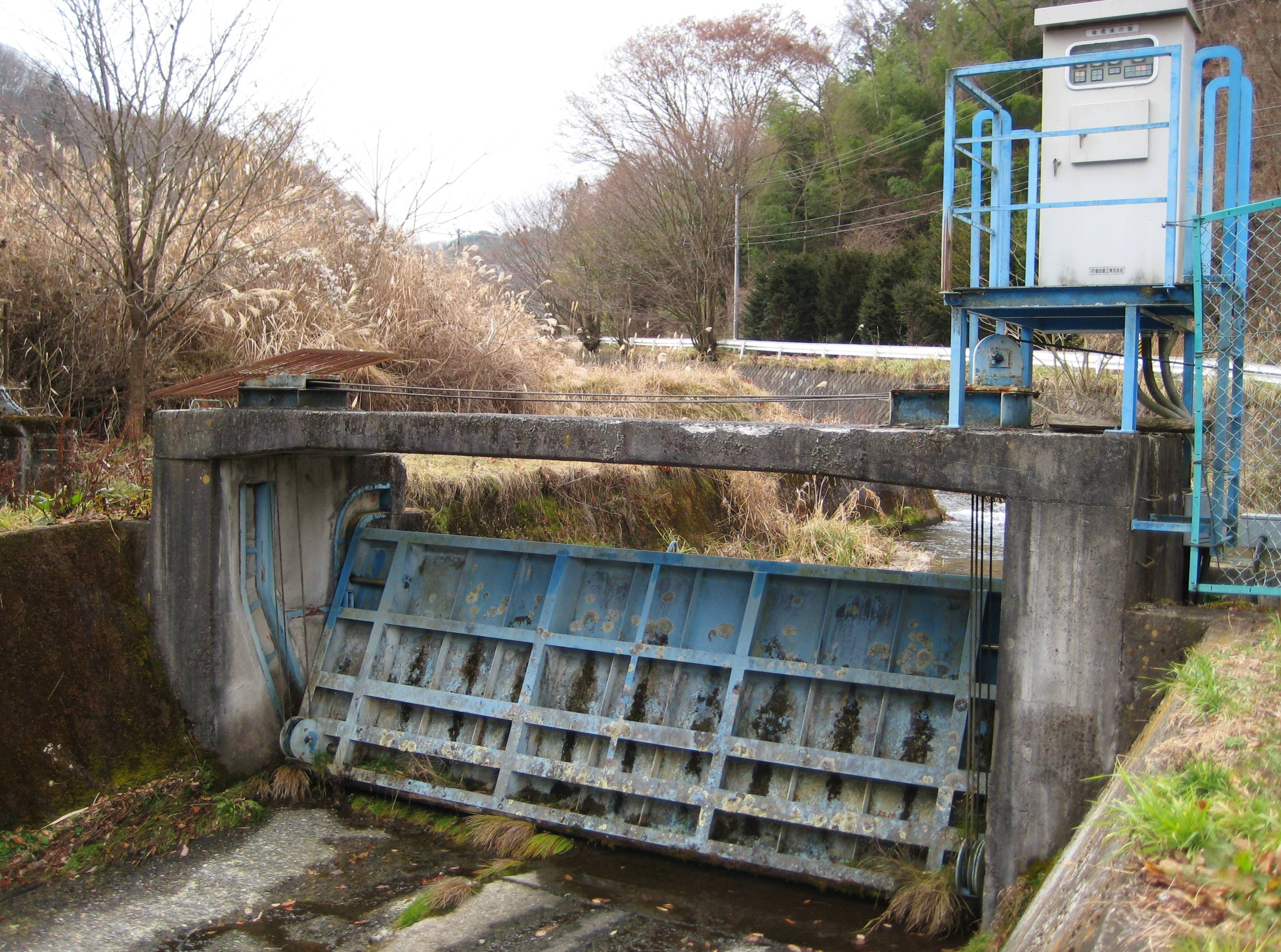
Araido Weir before renovation (taken in 2009)

== Folklore ==
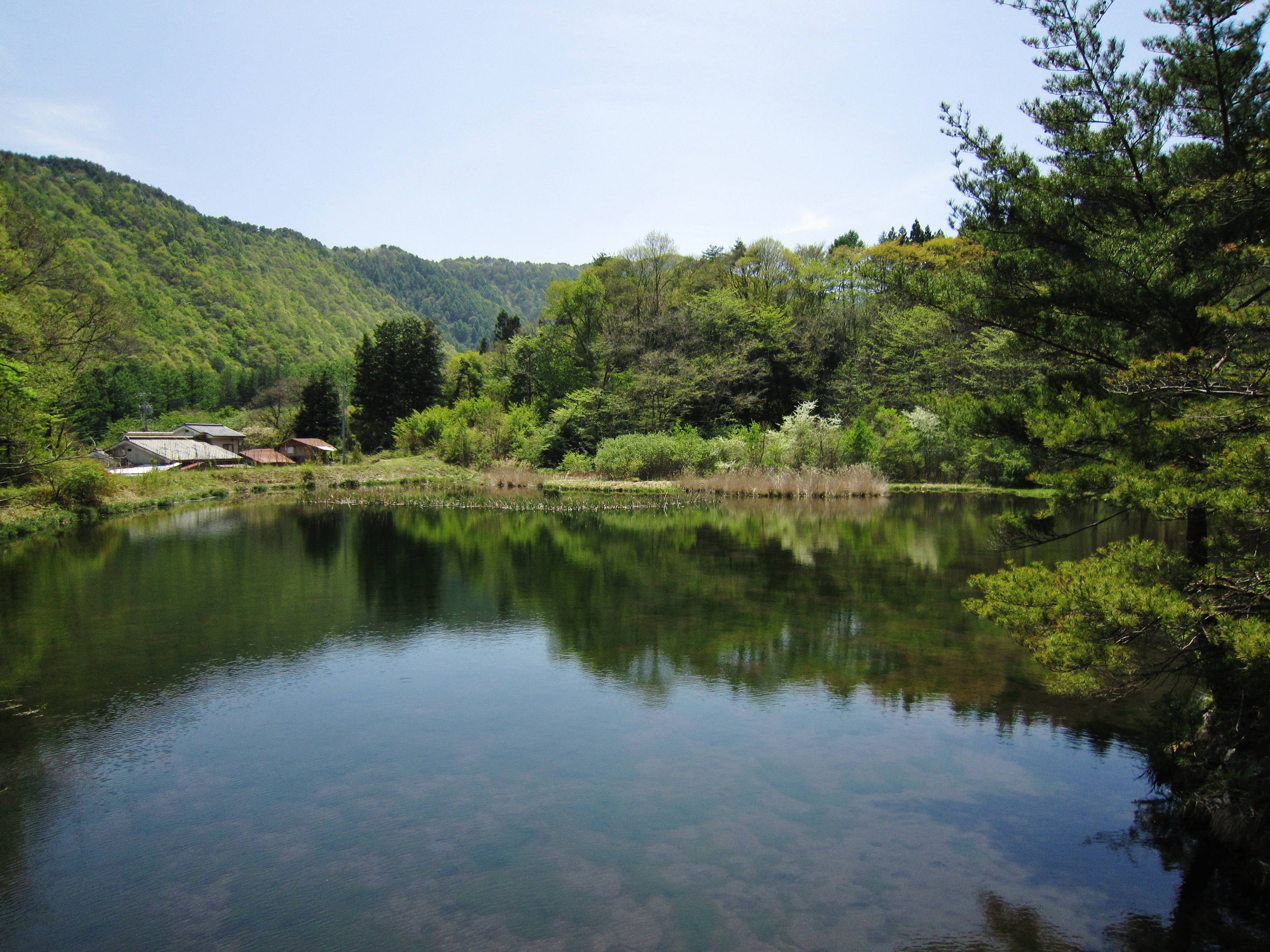
Yo no Ike in Nagawa, Chiisagata District

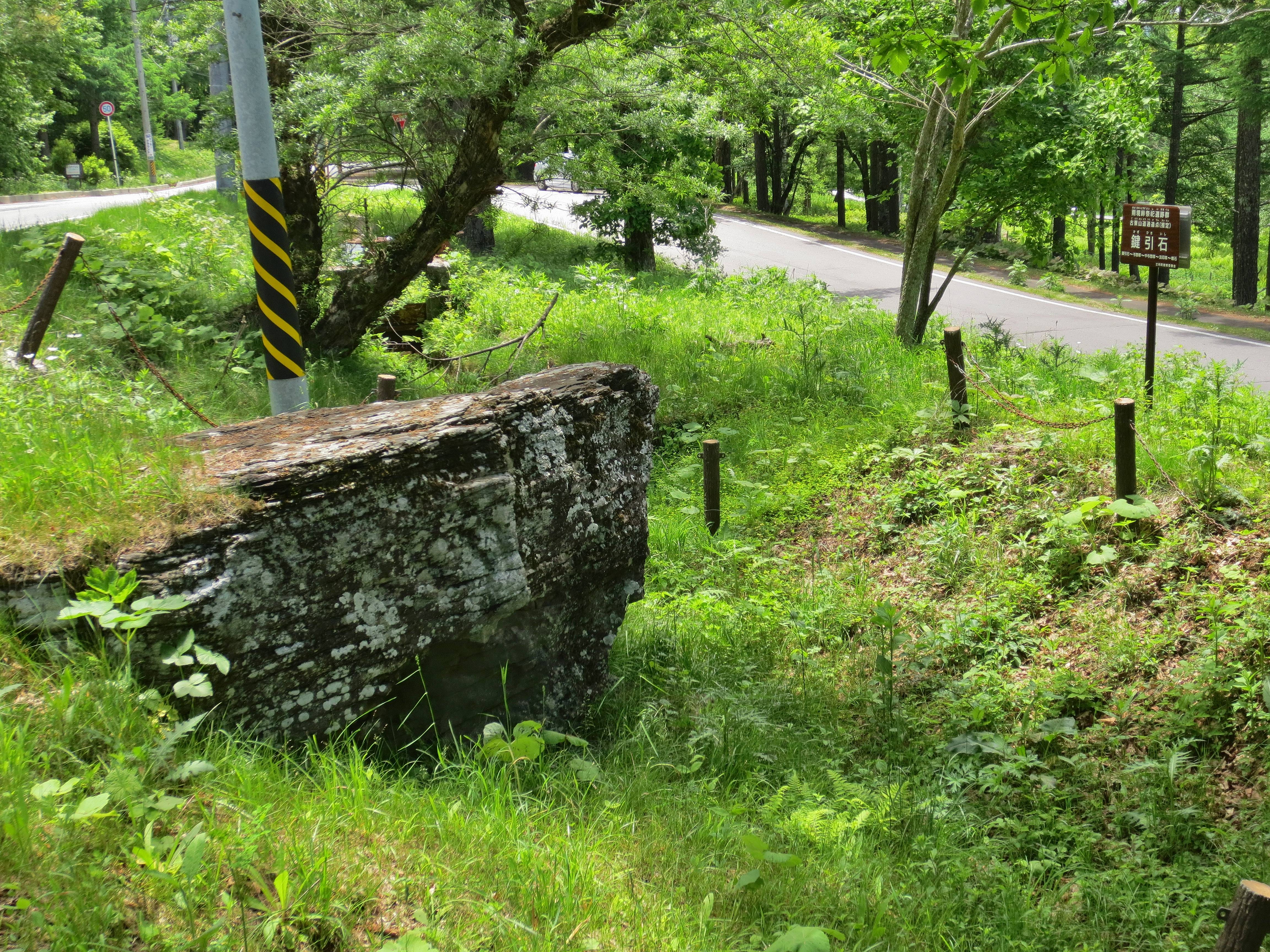
Kagihikiishi

=== Tales of kappa ===
Where Lake Megami now lies, there was once a pond called Akanuma Pond, in which a kappa called Kawatarō is said to have lived. The wicked Kawatarō would drag passersby into the water. When the samurai Suwa Yoritō heard of this, he went there and expelled the monster. Kawatarō promised to no longer do evil, and that night he left Akanuma Pond and went to live in a pond he made behind Wada-shuku. As the pond appeared overnight, it came to be known as Yo no Ike ('the Night Pond'), while Akanuma Pond dried up.

=== Kagihikiishi ===
Kagihikiishi is a giant stone near Megami Lake. Long ago travellers supposedly prayed at the stone for a safe journey. A historic landmark, today the stone is designated as one of Tateshina's cultural assets.

The kappa from the above story is said to have sat on this stone. Kawatarō would take the shape of a human child and sit upon the stone, inviting passersby to a game of kagihiki ('key (or hook) pulling'). In the game, the players makes their fingers into the shape of a hook (the Japanese words for 'key' and 'hook' are pronounced the same way), join them up with the other player and pull each other. Those unfortunate enough to play the game with Kawatarō would be dragged into the water by force once they locked fingers with him.

== Access ==
=== Public transport ===
Taking the Hokuriku Shinkansen to Sakudaira, the lake is a fifty-nine minute bus ride and two minute walk away.

From Chino on the Chuō Main Line, one can take the bus for forty-five minutes, change to another for ten minutes, then walking two minutes to the lake.

Nearby are the bus stops 'Megami-ko' (Lake Megami) and 'Kagihikiishi'.

=== Car ===
It takes fifty minutes to cover the thirty-seven kilometres from Saku Interchange on the Jōshin-etsu Expressway.

It takes forty minutes to cover the thirty kilometres from Suwa Interchange on the Chūō Expressway.

There is a car park that holds 250 cars and 80 coaches.
