= Motai-shuku =

Former mid-station on the Nakasendō, Japan

Coordinates: 36.273432°N 138.338391°E

Motai-shuku (茂田井宿, Motai-shuku) was a mid-station along the Nakasendō in Edo period Japan. An ainoshuku refers to a rest station, rather than a post town with lodging. It was in between the post stations of Mochizuki-shuku and Ashida-shuku. It is located in the present-day town of Saku, Nagano Prefecture, Japan. The head of the village, Ichirozaemon, began brewing sake in 1689 and there are two sake breweries still operating in the area.

== Neighboring post towns ==
Nakasendō
Mochizuki-shuku - Motai-shuku - Ashida-shuku

== Gallery ==
Motai Shuku showing traditional buildings along the Nakasendo

Motai shuku side street
