= Yawata-shuku =

Coordinates: 36.2735°N 138.3947°E

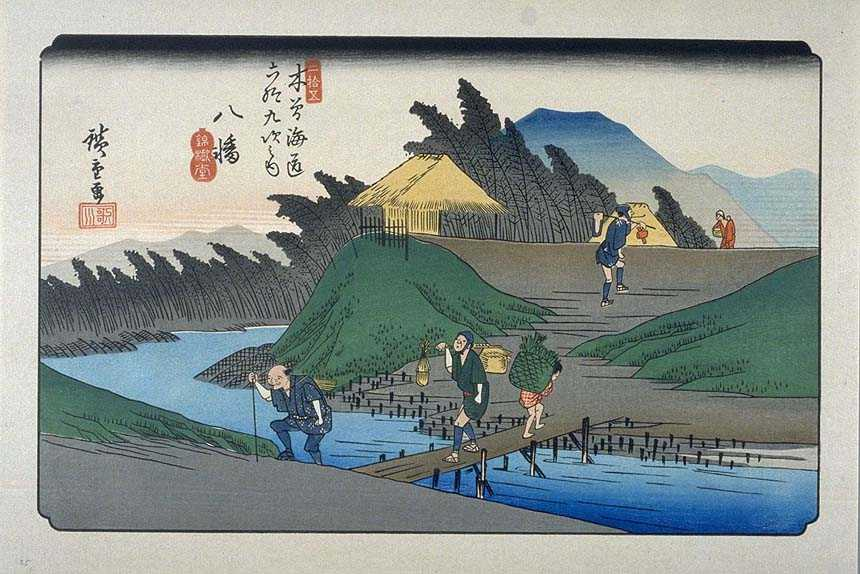
Hiroshige's print of Yawata-shuku, part of the series The Sixty-nine Stations of the Kiso Kaidō

Yawata-shuku (八幡宿, Yawata-shuku) was the twenty-fourth of the sixty-nine stations of the Nakasendō. It is located in the present-day city of Saku, in Nagano Prefecture, Japan.

== History ==
Yawata-shuku is located on the west bank of the Shinano River, just across from Shionada-shuku, the preceding post town. Though these two post towns are located not much more than 500 meters away, Yawata-shuku was able to develop during the Keichō era in the early Edo period. It was a comparatively small post town, but its prosperity came from it serving as a rest area at times when the Shinano River could not be crossed and as a distribution center for rice.

== Neighboring post towns ==
Nakasendō
Shionada-shuku - Yawata-shuku - Mochizuki-shuku
