= Mochizuki-shuku =

Coordinates: 36.2658°N 138.3622°E

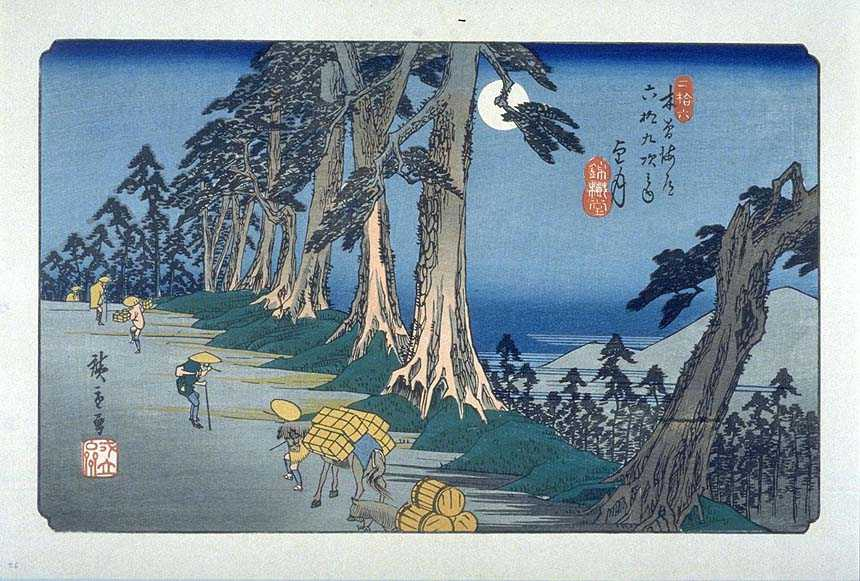
Hiroshige's print of Mochizuki-shuku, part of The Sixty-nine Stations of the Kiso Kaidō series

Mochizuki-shuku (望月宿, Mochizuki-shuku) was the twenty-fifth of the sixty-nine stations of the Nakasendō. It is located in the present-day city of Saku, in Nagano Prefecture, Japan.

== History ==
Located at the base of Mount Tateshina, Mochizuki has long been known for its horses. The area received its name, which roughly means "desirable moon," because it used to give horses to the Imperial Court and the shogunate on the day of the full moon on the fifteenth day of the eighth month, according to the old calendar.

Mimakigahara was located to the northeast of the post town. During the Heian and Kamakura periods of Japan, Mimakigahara was an imperial pasture.

== Neighboring Post Towns ==
Nakasendō
Yawata-shuku - Mochizuki-shuku - Ashida-shuku
(Motai-shuku was an ai no shuku located between Mochizuki-shuku and Ashida-shuku.)
