= Ashida-shuku =

Coordinates: 36.2732°N 138.3146°E

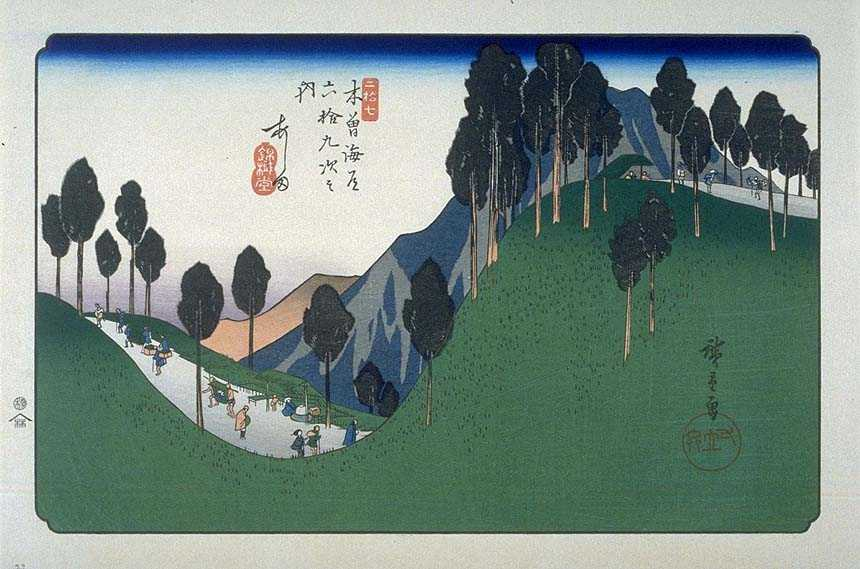
Hiroshige's print of Ashida-shuku, part of The Sixty-nine Stations of the Kiso Kaidō series

Ashida-shuku (芦田宿, Ashida-shuku) was the twenty-sixth of the sixty-nine stations of the Nakasendō. It is located in the present-day town of Tateshina, in the Kitasaku District of Nagano Prefecture, Japan.

== History ==
Ashida-shuku was formed in 1601 (425 years ago), during the Edo period, when the Nakasendō's route was altered and the government ordered creation of new post towns. It was located near the eastern entrance to the Kasadori Pass and was well known for its silk production.

== Neighboring post towns ==
Nakasendō
Mochizuki-shuku - Ashida-shuku - Nagakubo-shuku
(Motai-shuku was an ai no shuku located between Mochizuki-shuku and Ashida-shuku.)

== Gallery ==
Present day view of the Ashida-juku honjin along the Nakasendo.

View of the Ashida-juku honjin gate.

Present day interior view of the Ashida-juku honjin garden.
