= Shionada-shuku =

Coordinates: 36°16′16.4″N 138°25′18.6″E

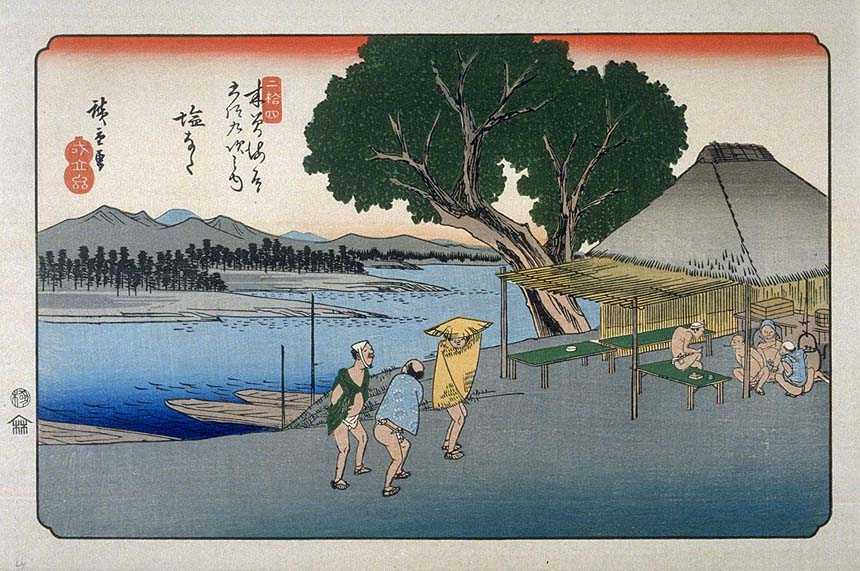
Hiroshige's print of Shionada-shuku, part of the series The Sixty-nine Stations of the Kiso Kaidō

Shionada-shuku (塩名田宿, Shionada-shuku) was the twenty-third of the sixty-nine stations of the Nakasendō. It is located in the present-day city of Saku, in Nagano Prefecture, Japan.

== History ==
Shionada-shuku is located on the eastern bank of the Shinano River, just across from Yawata-shuku. Both Shionada-shuku and Yawata-shuku were first developed under the orders of Tokugawa Ieyasu after the Battle of Sekigahara, and then were further developed after the development of the Tōkaidō and the Nakasendō. At its peak, the post town had about 10 minor inns, and in 1844, it was recorded to have two honjin and one sub-honjin.

There was a bridge which connected Shionada and Yawata, but it was washed away by a flood and never rebuilt. Instead, the river was crossed with ferry service or by fording.

== Neighboring post towns ==
Nakasendō
Iwamurada-shuku - Shionada-shuku - Yawata-shuku
