= Ōshū Kaidō =

Major route in Edo period

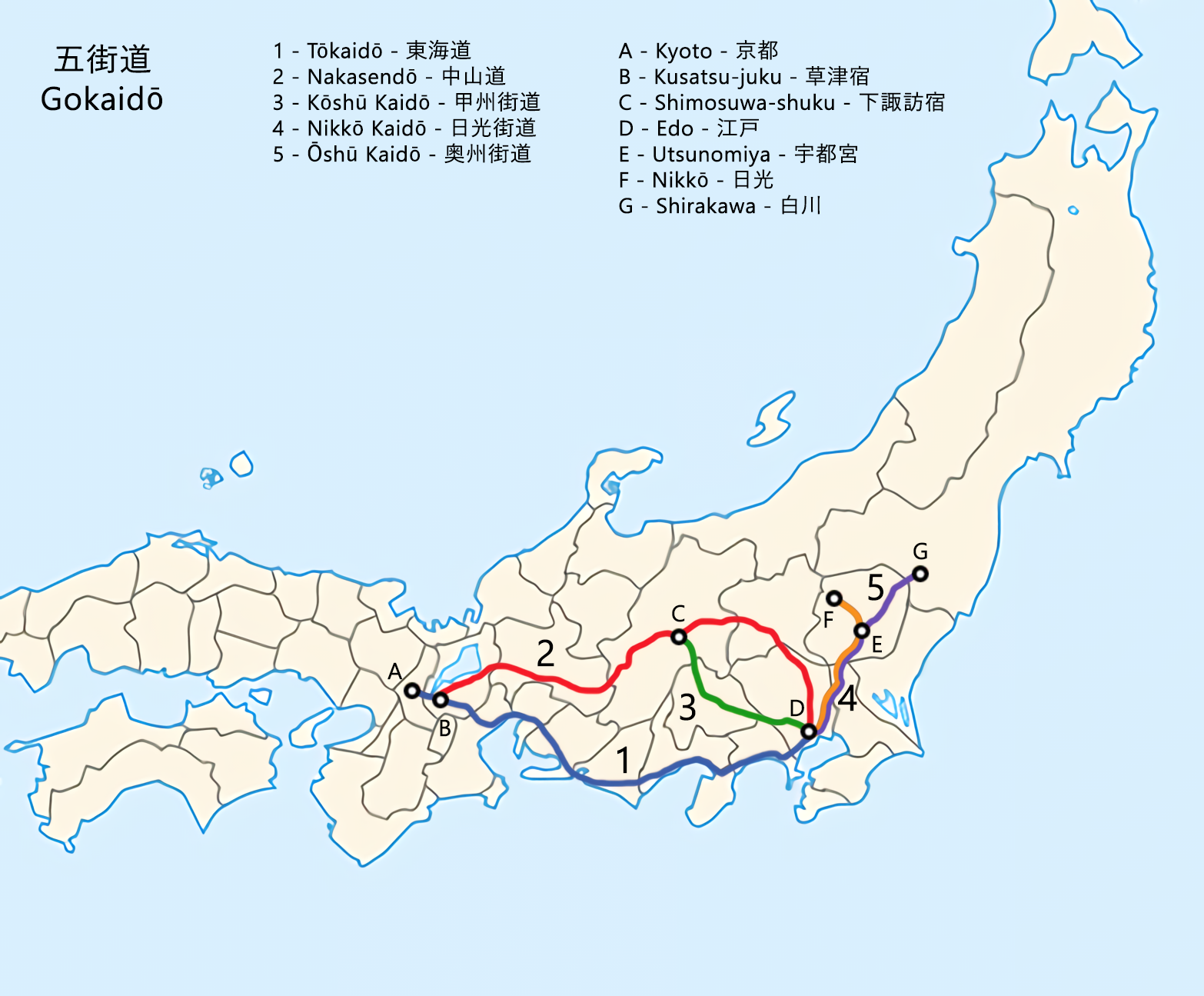
The Five Routes

The Ōshū Kaidō (奥州街道) was one of the centrally administered five routes of the Edo period. It was built to connect the de facto capital of Japan at Edo (modern-day Tokyo) with Mutsu Province and the present-day city of Shirakawa, Fukushima Prefecture, Japan. It was established by Tokugawa Ieyasu for government officials traveling through the area.

== Subroutes ==
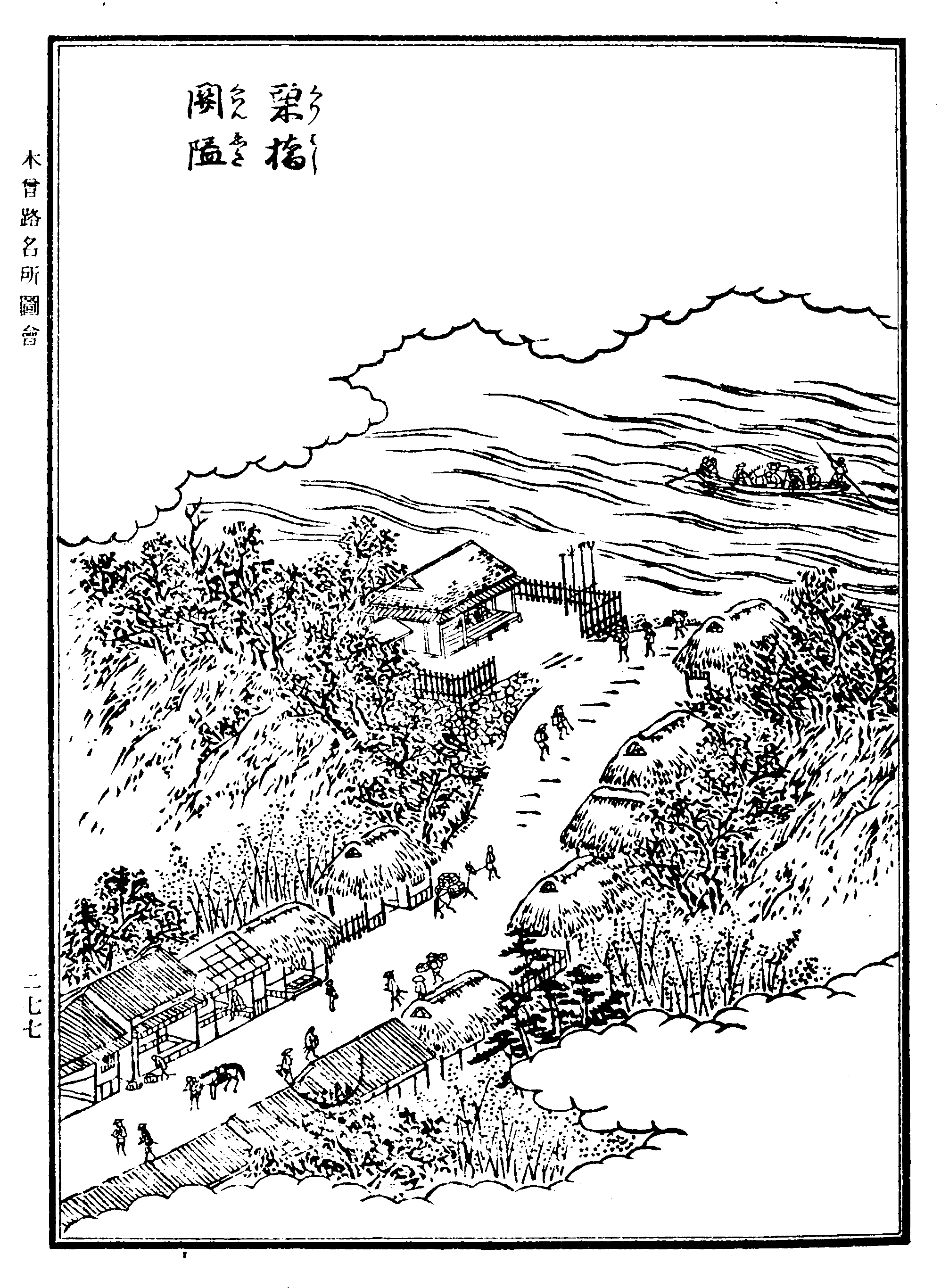
Illustration of the Ōshū Kaidō from the Edo period

In addition to the established use of traveling from Edo to Mutsu Province, there were also many roads that connected from the Ōshū Kaidō. One such sub-route was the Sendaidō (仙台道), which connected Mutsu Province with Sendai. The terminus for the Sendaidō is in Aoba-ku in modern Sendai. From there, the Matsumaedō (松前道) connected Sendai with Hakodate, Hokkaidō. Though the Ōshū Kaidō has only 27 post stations, there were over 100 designated post stations when the subroutes are included.

== Travel ==
In the early Edo period, travel along the road mostly consisted of magistrates heading towards Edo in order to take part in sankin kōtai. After Hakodate's development, the late Edo period saw travel further increase as a result of increasing trade with Russia.

Nowadays, the path of the Ōshū Kaidō and its extensions is followed by National Route 4 from Tokyo to Aomori via Sendai and National Route 280 from Aomori to Minamya.

== Stations of the Ōshū Kaidō ==
The 27 stations of the Ōshū Kaidō are listed below in order and are divided by their modern-day prefecture. The first seventeen stations are shared with the Nikkō Kaidō. The present day municipality is listed afterwards in parentheses.

=== Tokyo ===
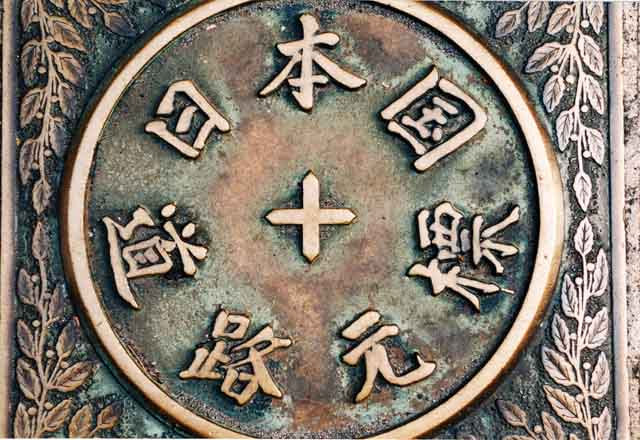
Nihonbashi's highway distance marker

Starting Location: Nihonbashi (日本橋) (Chūō-ku)
1. Senju-shuku (千住宿) (Adachi-ku)

=== Saitama Prefecture ===
2. Sōka-shuku (草加宿) (Sōka)
3. Koshigaya-shuku (越ヶ谷宿) (Koshigaya)
4. Kasukabe-shuku (粕壁宿) (Kasukabe)
5. Sugito-shuku (杉戸宿) (Sugito, Kitakatsushika District)
6. Satte-shuku (幸手宿) (Satte)
7. Kurihashi-shuku (栗橋宿) (Kuki)

=== Ibaraki Prefecture ===
8. Nakada-shuku (中田宿) (Koga)
9. Koga-shuku (古河宿) (Koga)

=== Tochigi Prefecture ===
10. Nogi-shuku (野木宿) (Nogi, Shimotsuga District)
11. Mamada-shuku (間々田宿) (Oyama)
12. Oyama-shuku (小山宿) (Oyama)
13. Shinden-shuku (新田宿) (Oyama)
14. Koganei-shuku (小金井宿) (Shimotsuke)
15. Ishibashi-shuku (石橋宿) (Shimotsuke)
16. Suzumenomiya-shuku (雀宮宿) (Utsunomiya)
17. Utsunomiya-shuku (宇都宮宿) (Utsunomiya)
18. Shirosawa-shuku (白澤宿) (Utsunomiya)
19. Ujiie-shuku (氏家宿) (Sakura)
20. Kitsuregawa-shuku (喜連川宿) (Sakura)
21. Sakuyama-shuku (佐久山宿) (Ōtawara)
- Yagisawa-shuku (八木沢宿) (Ōtawara) (ai no shuku)
22. Ōtawara-shuku (大田原宿) (Ōtawara)
23. Nabekake-shuku (鍋掛宿) (Nasushiobara)
24. Koebori-shuku (越堀宿) (Nasushiobara)
- Terago-shuku (寺子宿) (Nasushiobara) (ai no shuku)
25. Ashino-shuku (芦野宿) (Nasu, Nasu District)
- Tani-shuku (谷宿) (Nasu, Nasu District) (ai no shuku)
- Yorii-shuku (寄居宿) (Nasu, Nasu District) (ai no shuku)

=== Fukushima Prefecture ===
26. Shirosaka-shuku (白坂宿) (Shirakawa)
27. Shirakawa-shuku (白河宿) (Shirakawa)
Ending Location: Shirakawa Castle (白河城) (Shirakawa)

== See also ==
- Edo Five Routes
  - Tōkaidō (or 53 Stations of the Tōkaidō)
  - Nakasendō (or 69 Stations of the Nakasendō)
  - Kōshū Kaidō
  - Nikkō Kaidō
- Other routes
  - Hokkoku Kaidō
  - Kisoji
  - Mikuni Kaidō
  - Tanabu Kaidō
