= Unuma-juku =

Pre-modern Japan post-station along highway

Unuma-juku 鵜沼宿
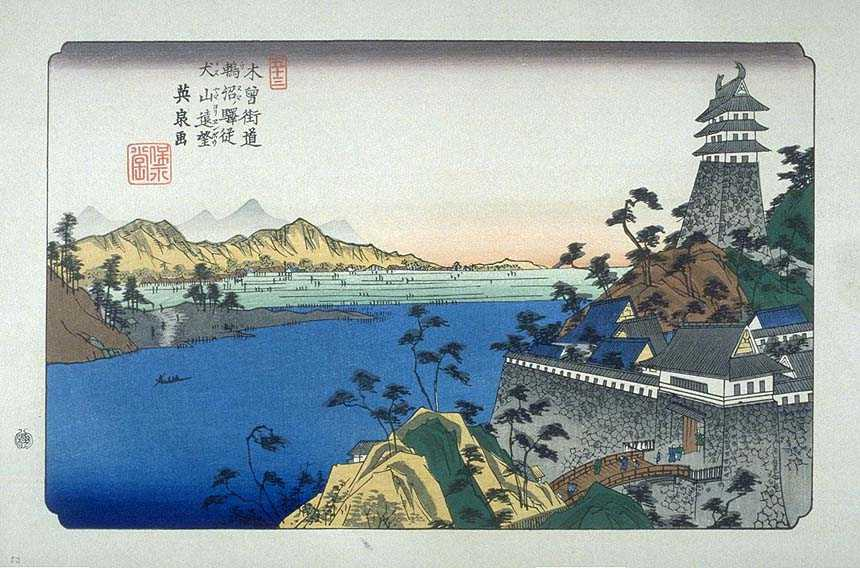
- Hiroshige's print of Unuma-juku, part of the Sixty-nine Stations of the Kiso Kaidō series

General information
- Location: Kakamigahara, Gifu (former Mino Province); Japan
- Coordinates: 35°24′16.7″N 136°56′14″E
- Elevation: 58 m (190 ft)
- System: post station
- Line: Nakasendō
- Distance: 396.0 km from Edo
Location
- Location within Gifu Prefecture Location within Japan

Unuma-juku (鵜沼宿, Unuma-juku) was the fifty-second of the sixty-nine stations of the Nakasendō connecting Edo with Kyoto in Edo period Japan. It is located in former Mino Province in what is now part of the city of Kakamigahara, Gifu Prefecture, Japan.

== History ==
Unuma was an important junction linking the routes that connected the provinces of Mino and Owari. It is of ancient origin, having been a stop on the old Tōsandō road, that predated the creation of the Nakasendō. It was also the last post station on the Inagi Kaidō, which was a side road connecting Inuyama with what is now central Nagoya. The eastern and western portions of the old post town joined together to become a formal post station in 1651. During the Edo period, it was part of the territory of the Owari Domain, governed via Inuyama Castle, located on the opposite bank of the Kiso River, about two kilometers south.

Per the 1843 "中山道宿村大概帳" (Nakasendō Shukuson Taigaichō) guidebook issued by the Inspector of Highways (道中奉行, Dōchu-būgyō), the town had a population of 246 people in 68 houses, including one honjin, one waki-honjin, and 25 hatago. Unuma-juku is 396.0 kilometers from Edo and approximately six kilometers from the preceding post town, Ōta-juku.

Modern Unuma-juku has been preserved with restoration of several of its surviving old buildings, including the waki-honjin, as well as several machiya, a sake brewery and other structures, and (unusually for Japanese towns), the electrical and telephone wires were buried underground. Restoration work was completed in 2013 and the area is now a popular tourist destination. The old post town contains such historical treasures as Kuan-ji Temple, the ancient tomb of Ishozuka, and haiku-engraved monuments left by Matsuo Bashō.

== Unuma-juku in The Sixty-nine Stations of the Kiso Kaidō ==
Utagawa Hiroshige's ukiyo-e print of Unuma-juku dates from 1835 -1838. The print depicts a dramatic and rather stylized view of Inuyama Castle from the Owari side of the Kiso River. Travelers are crossing a wooden bridge over a moat, towards a ferry landing. The post station itself is barely visible in the far distance across a wide river.

== Gallery ==
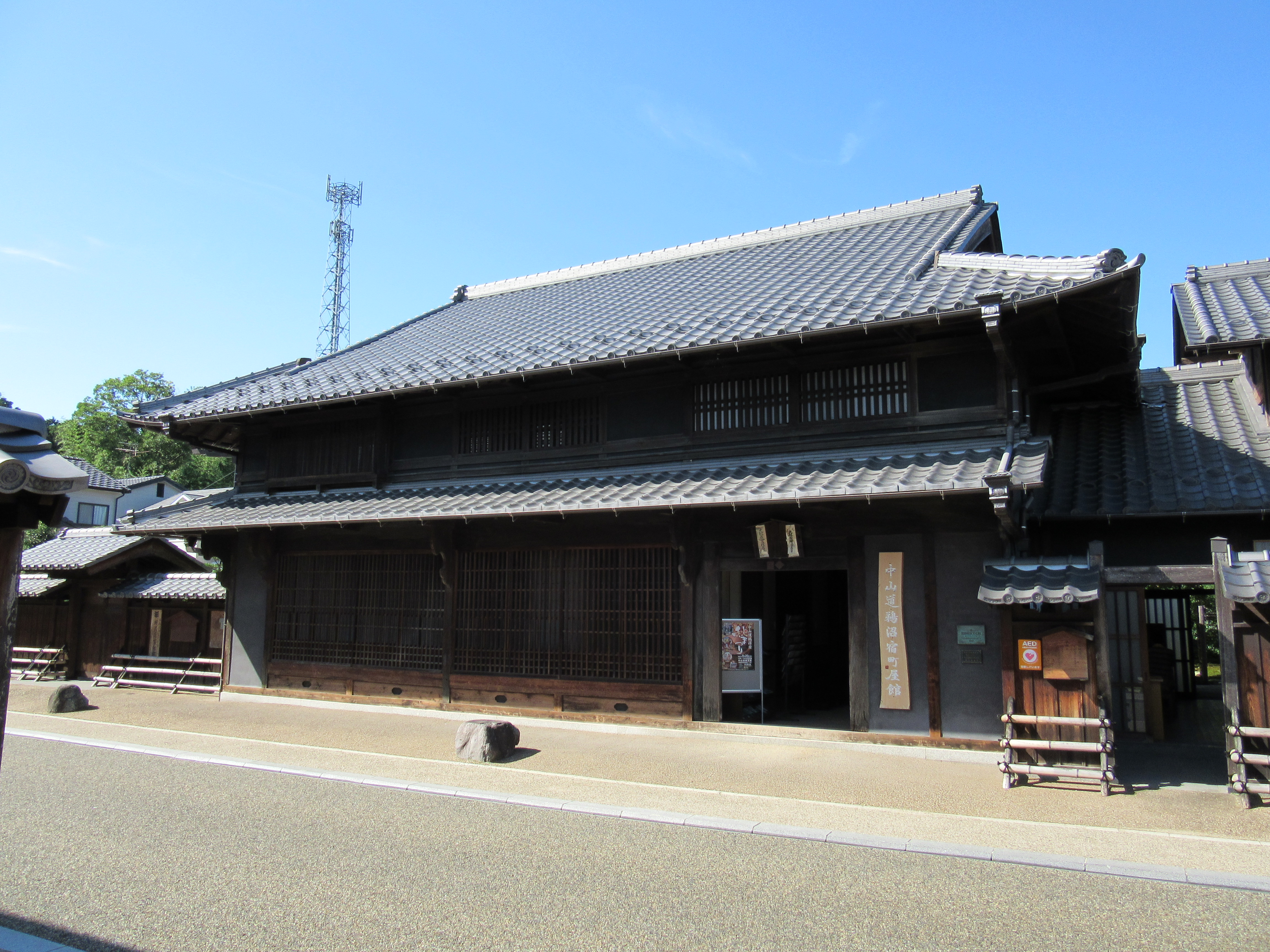
restored machiya

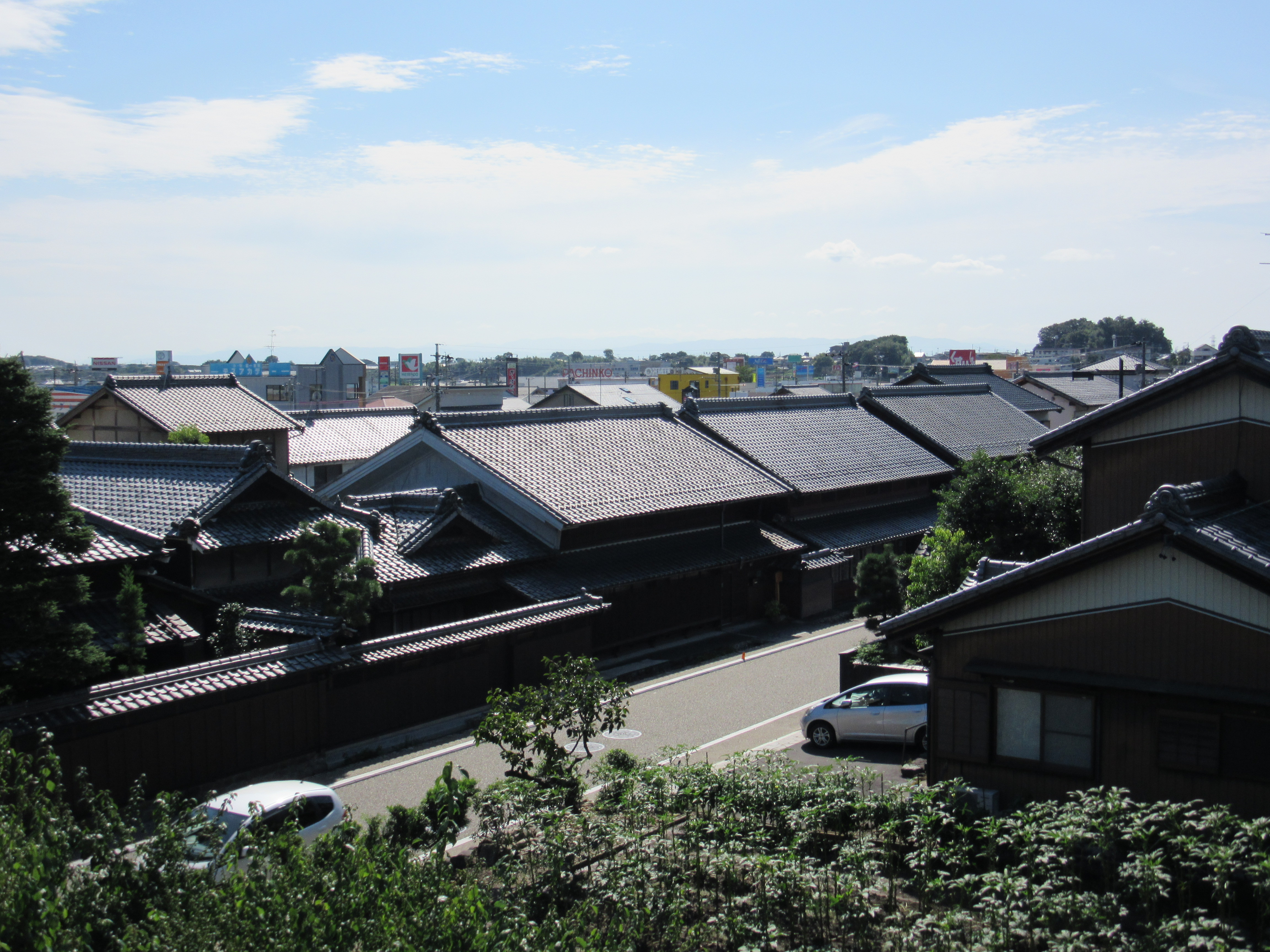
View from Ninomiya Jinja

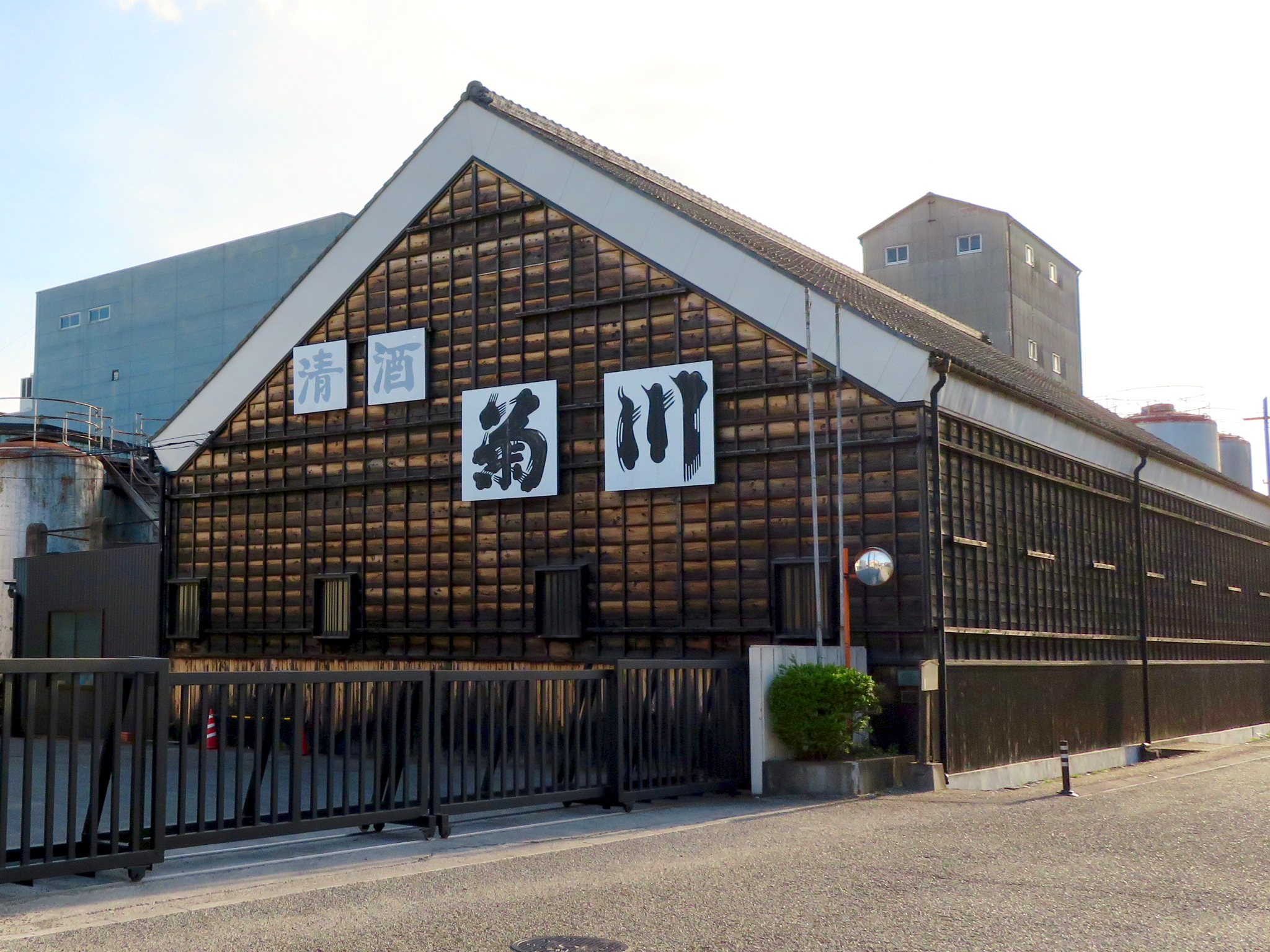
Kikugawa sake brewery

== Neighboring Post Towns ==
Nakasendō
Ōta-juku - Unuma-juku - Kanō-juku
(Shinkanō-juku was an ai no shuku located between Unuma-juku and Kanō-juku.)

Inagi Kaidō
Unuma-juku - Inuyama-juku
