= Kanō-juku =

Pre-modern Japan post-station along highway

Kanō-juku 加納宿
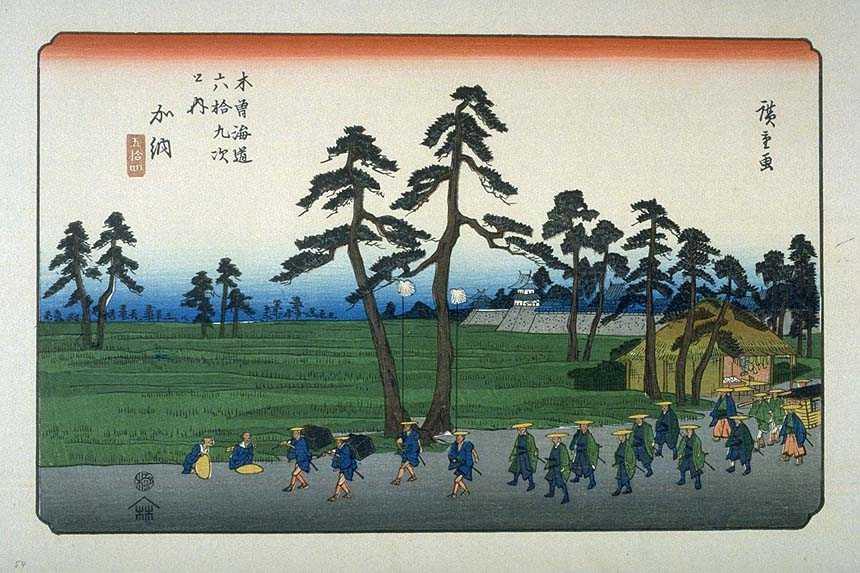
- Hiroshige's print of Kanō-juku, part of the Sixty-nine Stations of the Kiso Kaidō series

General information
- Location: Gifu Gifu Prefecture (former Mino Province); Japan
- Coordinates: 35°24′20″N 136°45′34″E
- Elevation: 14 m (46 ft)
- System: post station
- Line: Nakasendō
- Distance: 412.8 km from Edo
Location
- Location within Gifu Prefecture Location within Japan

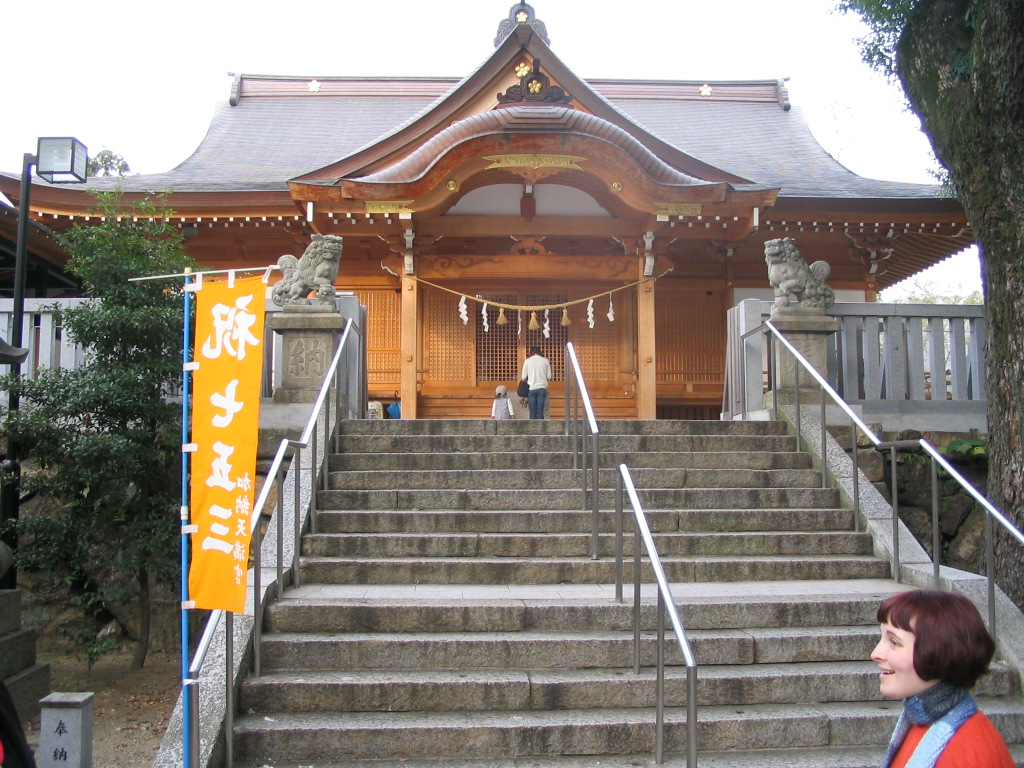
Kanō Tenmangu Shrine in Kanō-juku

Kanō-juku (加納宿, Kanō-juku) was the fifty-third of the sixty-nine stations of the Nakasendō connecting Edo with Kyoto in Edo period Japan. It is located in former Mino Province in what is now part of the city of Gifu, Gifu Prefecture, Japan.

== History ==
Kanō-juku is located just south of JR Gifu Station in Japan, and was a castle town for Kanō Castle. The first construction of Kanō Castle began in 1445 by Saitō Toshinaga, who was a vassal of the Toki clan; however, this castle was abandoned by 1538. Following the Battle of Sekigahara, the victorious Tokugawa Ieyasu awarded Gifu Castle to his son-in-law, Okudaira Nobumasa. However, due to its poor state of repair, Nobumasa decided to abolish Gifu Castle and to relocate to a new castle built on the site of the old Kanō Castle. This new structure was completed in 1603 in record time, as Ieyasu had ordered various daimyō to contribute materials, labor and money for its construction, and the largest three-story yagura was transferred from Gifu Castle to be its tenshu. The design of the castle was also kept simple, with a minimal number of towers, as the castle was being constructed as a center of local administration in peacetime.

Per the 1843 "中山道宿村大概帳" (Nakasendō Shukuson Taigaichō) guidebook issued by the Inspector of Highways (道中奉行, Dōchu-būgyō), the town had a population of 2728 people in 805 houses, including one honjin, one waki-honjin, and 35 hatago. It extended for approximately 2.3 km (1.4 mi) along the highway, making it the largest post town in Mino Province. The town was noted for its production of washi (Japanese paper). It is located 412.8 kilometers from Edo. During the Bakumatsu period, Princess Kazu-no-miya stayed at the honjin in Kanō-juku in 1861 en route to marry Shogun Tokugawa Iemochi in Edo.

The 1891 Mino–Owari earthquake and the 1945 Bombing of Gifu in World War II destroyed all of the old buildings at Kanō-juku, with the exception of some structures of the Kanō Tenman-gū, which had originally been built to serve as a place of worship for the castle's residents.

== Kanō-juku in The Sixty-nine Stations of the Kiso Kaidō ==
Utagawa Hiroshige's ukiyo-e print of Kanō-juku dates from 1835 -1838. The print depicts a daimyō procession on sankin kōtai departing Kanō Castle at dawn. The tenshu of Kanō Castle had burned down in 1728 and was never rebuilt, and Hiroshige depicts the castle accurately with low stone walls and a corner yagura watchtower. The road is lined with pine trees, and the kago containing the daimyō himself can just be seen at the far right side of the composition.

== Neighboring post towns ==
Nakasendō
Unuma-juku - Kanō-juku - Gōdo-juku
(Shinkanō-juku was an ai no shuku located between Unuma-juku and Kanō-juku.)
