= Tanabu Kaidō =

- Tanabu Highway (田名部街道)

Route information
- Established by Nanbu clan, Tokugawa shogunate
- Time period: Edo
- Related routes: Matsumaedō; Ōshū Kaidō; National Route 279; National Route 338
- Restrictions: Permit required to travel beyond each check station

Major junctions
- South end: Matsumaedō at Noheji-shukuba in Noheji
- North end: Tanabu-shukuba in Tanabu

Location
- Country: Japan

Highway system
- National highways of Japan; Expressways of Japan

The Tanabu Kaidō (田名部街道) is a road in eastern Aomori Prefecture that connects the town of Noheji in the south, to the city of Mutsu to the north. It was established by the Nanbu clan as an extension of the Matsumaedō a sub-route of the Ōshū Kaidō, one of the five routes established by Tokugawa Ieyasu for traveling government officials during the Edo period.

== Stations of the Tanabu Kaidō ==
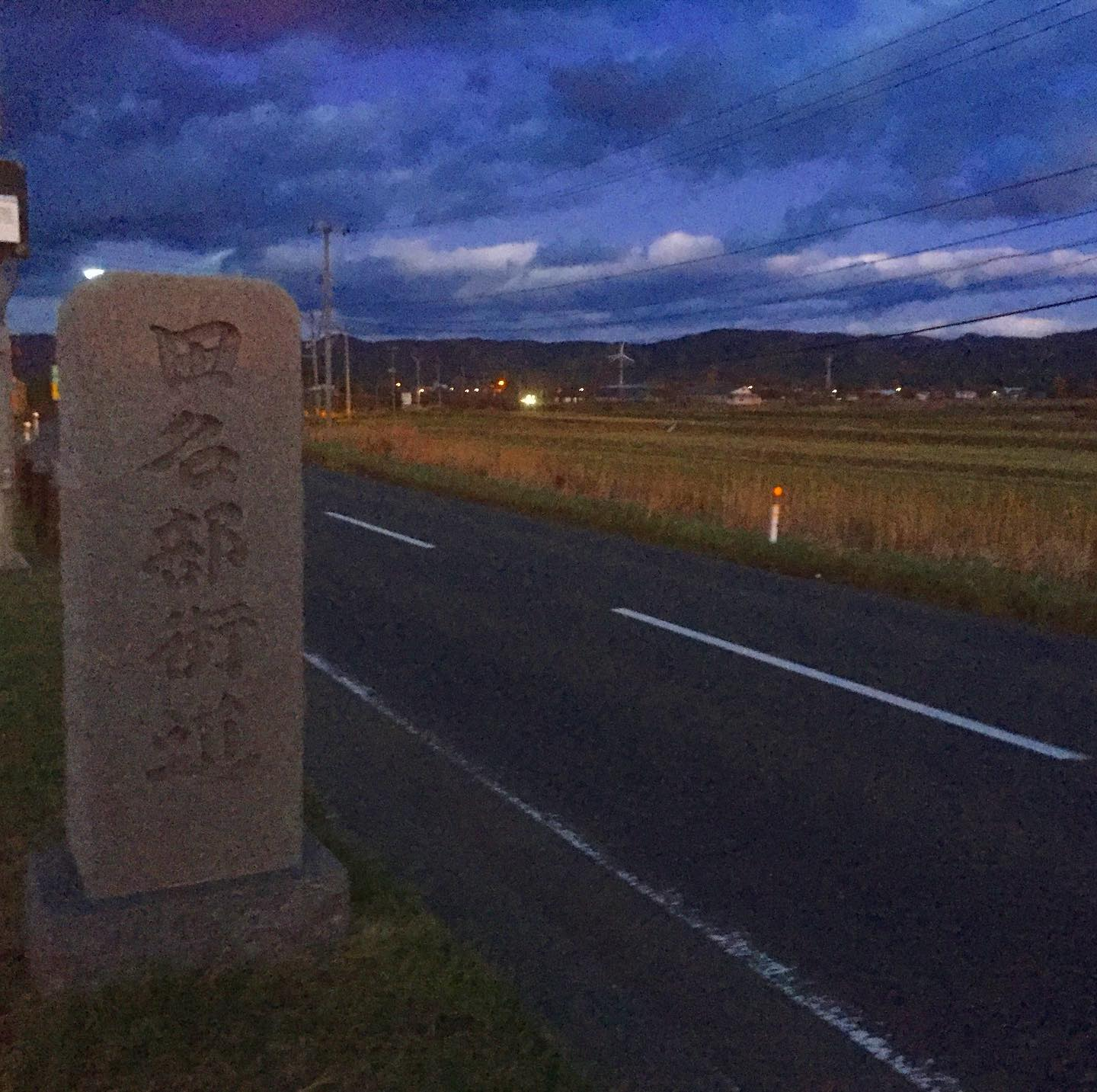
A stone marker denoting the path of the Tanabu-kaido in Yokohama

The 5 stations of the Tanabu Kaidō are listed below from south to north. The present-day municipality is listed afterwards in parentheses.

1. Noheji-shukuba (野辺地宿) (Noheji)
2. Arito (有戸) (Noheji)
3. Yokohama-shukuba (横浜宿) (Yokohama)
4. Nakanosawa (中野沢) (Mutsu)
5. Tanabu-shukuba (田名部宿) (Mutsu)

== History ==
The Tanabu Kaidō was established by the Nanbu clan during the Edo period between Noheji-shukuba and the Buddhist temple and folk religion pilgrimage destination at Mount Osore, a caldera believed in Japanese mythology to be a gate to the underworld, near the former town of Tanabu (now part of Mutsu). The road was a branch of the longer Ōshū Kaidō (now known as National Route 4) that was located entirely within the northern Morioka Domain. Pilgrimages along what was to become the road to Mount Osore date back to 862, but its uncertain if the establishment of a maintained road took place before the Nanbu built the Tananbu-kaidō. The Nanbu had a large military camp in Tanabu, so quick movement to the commercial port and border town of Noheji was crucial to the defense of their domain. In the later Edo period, the road gained further defensive significance when foreign ships began to be spotted in the Tsugaru Strait and Mutsu Bay near Shimokita Peninsula. As a result of this, the shogunate ordered the road to be extended to Sai in 1803. In 1808, the Tokugawa shogunate assigned the Nanbu clan responsibility for the defense of a portion of southern Ezo, further increasing the road's defensive importance to the shogunate and the clan.

National Route 279 was established by the Cabinet of Japan along the Tananbu Kaidō between Noheji and Ōma in 1970.
