= Tateshina, Nagano =

Town in Nagano Prefecture, Japan

Tateshina 立科町
- Town
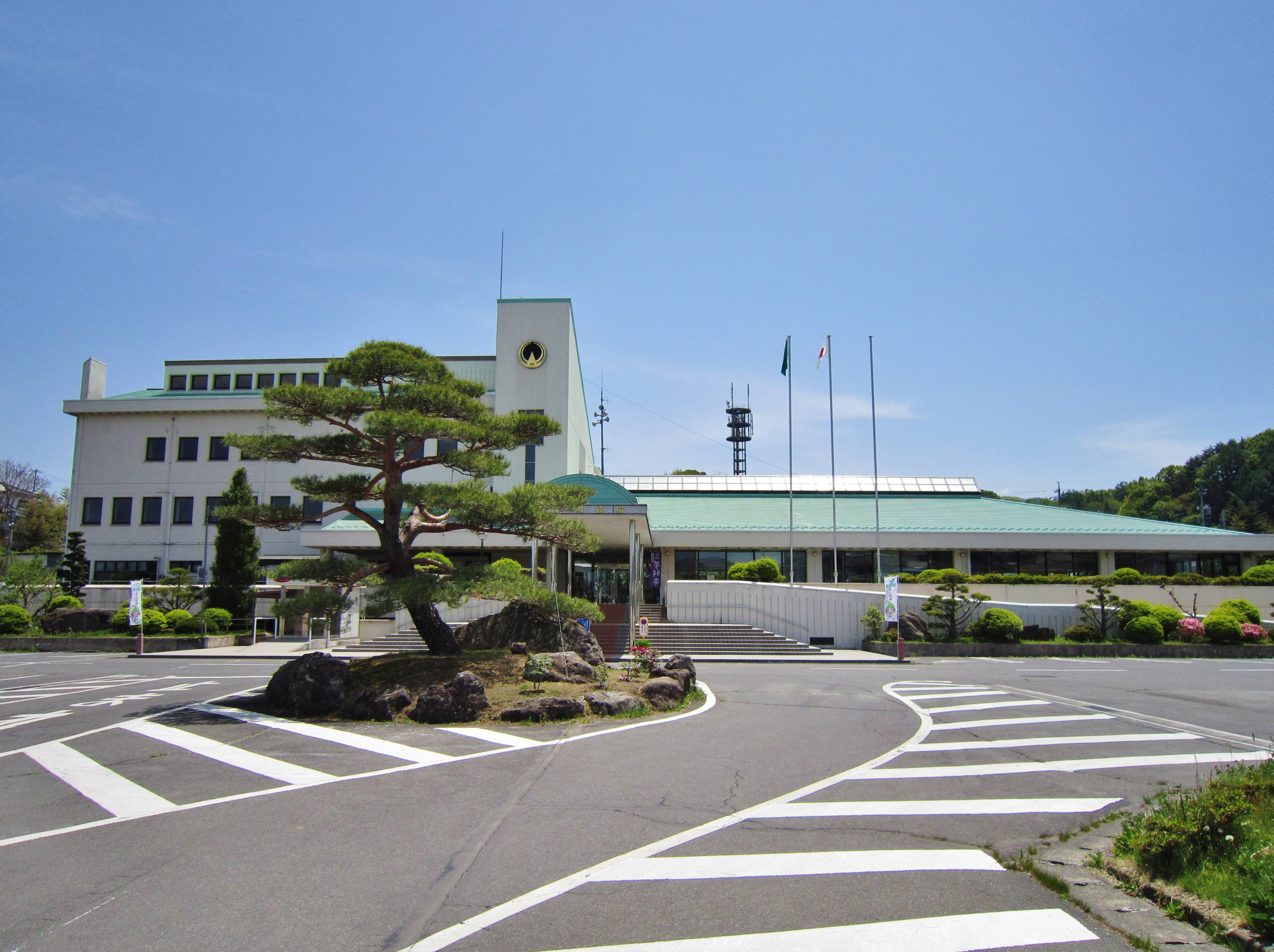
- Tateshina Town Hall

- Flag Seal

- Location of Tateshina in Nagano Prefecture

- Coordinates: 36°16′19.2″N 138°18′57.3″E
- Country: Japan
- Region: Chūbu (Kōshin'etsu)
- Prefecture: Nagano
- District: Kitasaku

Area
  - Total: 66.87 km^{2} (25.82 sq mi)

Population (April 2019)
  - Total: 7,147
  - Density: 106.9/km^{2} (276.8/sq mi)
- Time zone: UTC+9 (Japan Standard Time)
- Phone number: 0267-57-2311
- Address: 2532 Ashida, Tateshina-machi, Kitasaku-gun, Nagano-ken 384-2305, Japan
- Climate: Dfa
- Website: Official website
- Symbols
- Bird: Green pheasant
- Flower: Lily of the valley
- Tree: Betula platyphylla

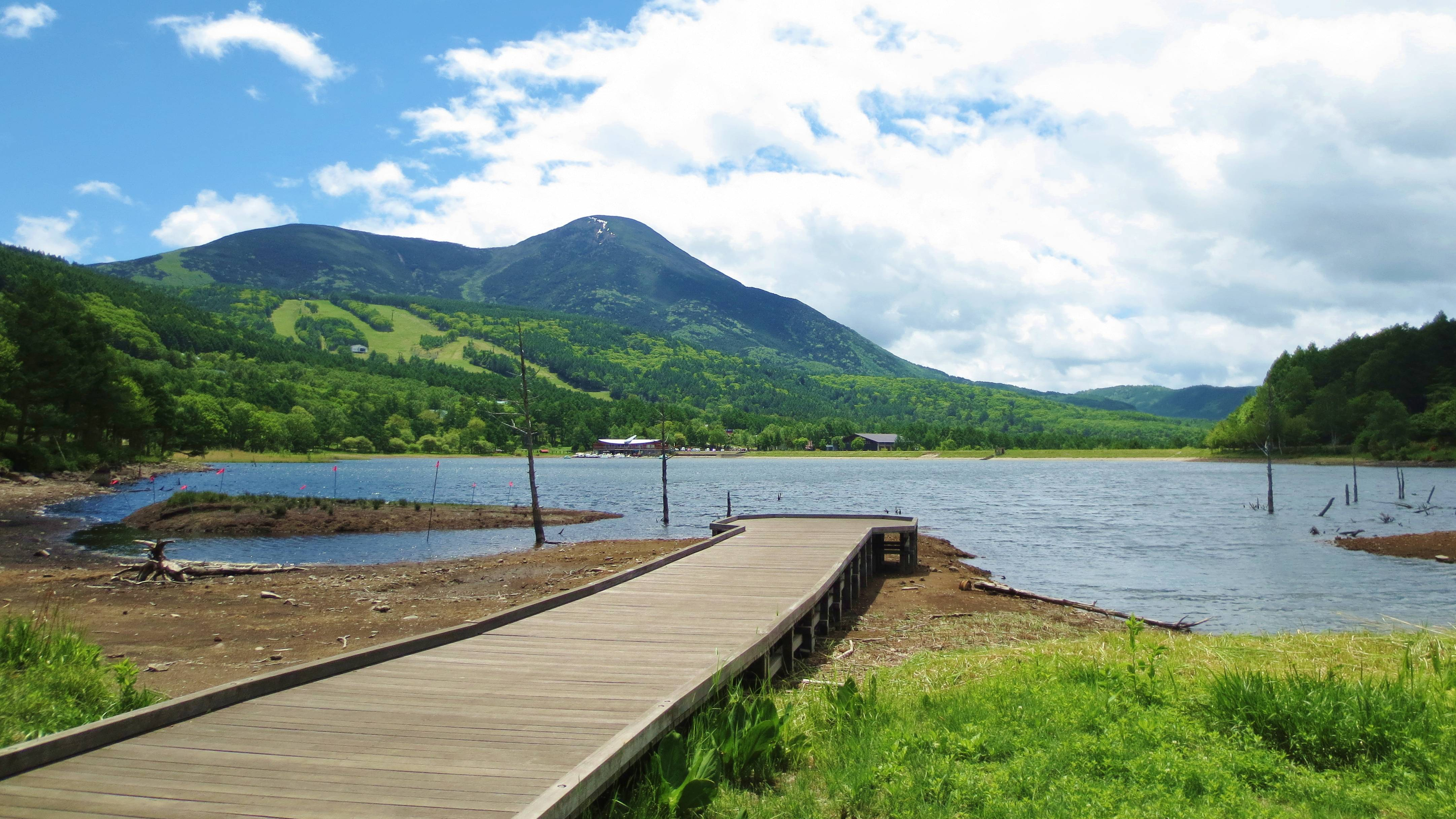
Lake Megami in Tateshina

Tateshina (立科町, Tateshina-machi) is a town located in Nagano Prefecture, Japan. As of 1 April 2019, the town had an estimated population of 7,147 in 2834 households, and a population density of 110 persons per km^{2}. The total area of the town is 66.87 square kilometres (25.82 sq mi). Tateshina is famous for its apple orchards.

== Geography ==
Tateshina is located in the Tateshina Mountainous of central Nagano Prefecture.

=== Surrounding municipalities ===
- Nagano Prefecture
  - Chino
  - Nagawa
  - Saku
  - Tōmi
  - Ueda

=== Climate ===
The town has a climate characterized by hot and humid summers, and cold winters (Köppen climate classification Dwa). The average annual temperature in Tateshina is 10.4 °C (50.7 °F). The average annual rainfall is 1,069.8 mm (42.12 in) with September as the wettest month. The temperatures are highest on average in August, at around 23.0 °C (73.4 °F), and lowest in January, at around −2.1 °C (28.2 °F).

Climate data for Tateshina (1991−2020 normals, extremes 1978−present)
Month	Jan	Feb	Mar	Apr	May	Jun	Jul	Aug	Sep	Oct	Nov	Dec	Year
Record high °C (°F)	15.7 (60.3)	19.4 (66.9)	26.2 (79.2)	29.6 (85.3)	32.7 (90.9)	34.6 (94.3)	36.0 (96.8)	35.6 (96.1)	33.9 (93.0)	29.6 (85.3)	25.0 (77.0)	21.7 (71.1)	36.0 (96.8)
Mean daily maximum °C (°F)	3.3 (37.9)	4.6 (40.3)	9.4 (48.9)	16.1 (61.0)	21.5 (70.7)	24.4 (75.9)	28.3 (82.9)	29.4 (84.9)	24.4 (75.9)	18.2 (64.8)	12.5 (54.5)	6.5 (43.7)	16.6 (61.8)
Daily mean °C (°F)	−2.1 (28.2)	−1.2 (29.8)	2.8 (37.0)	8.9 (48.0)	14.6 (58.3)	18.5 (65.3)	22.3 (72.1)	23.0 (73.4)	18.6 (65.5)	12.2 (54.0)	6.2 (43.2)	0.7 (33.3)	10.4 (50.7)
Mean daily minimum °C (°F)	−8.0 (17.6)	−7.3 (18.9)	−3.3 (26.1)	1.8 (35.2)	8.3 (46.9)	13.8 (56.8)	17.9 (64.2)	18.5 (65.3)	14.2 (57.6)	7.4 (45.3)	0.5 (32.9)	−4.7 (23.5)	4.9 (40.9)
Record low °C (°F)	−19.0 (−2.2)	−20.7 (−5.3)	−15.6 (3.9)	−11.2 (11.8)	−2.9 (26.8)	3.9 (39.0)	9.6 (49.3)	9.7 (49.5)	2.4 (36.3)	−3.4 (25.9)	−10.9 (12.4)	−17.4 (0.7)	−20.7 (−5.3)
Average precipitation mm (inches)	33.7 (1.33)	35.9 (1.41)	67.8 (2.67)	69.7 (2.74)	90.7 (3.57)	130.6 (5.14)	150.6 (5.93)	118.8 (4.68)	159.5 (6.28)	132.1 (5.20)	50.9 (2.00)	29.7 (1.17)	1,069.8 (42.12)
Average precipitation days (≥ 1.0 mm)	5.1	5.7	8.3	8.5	9.2	11.5	13.3	10.3	10.6	8.6	6.3	5.5	102.9
Mean monthly sunshine hours	183.1	182.3	195.5	206.1	216.3	161.5	169.1	200.0	149.8	157.6	171.3	172.4	2,164.8
Source: Japan Meteorological Agency

== History ==
The area of present-day Tateshina was part of ancient Shinano Province, and Ashida-shuku developed as a post station on the Nakasendō highway connecting Edo with Kyoto. The village of Ashida, Yokotori and Mitsuwa were created with the establishment of the modern municipalities system on April 1, 1889. These three villages merged to form the village of Tateshina on April 1, 1955. Tateshina was raised to town status on October 1, 1953.

== Demographics ==
Per Japanese census data, the population of Tateshina has declined in recent decades.

Historical population
Year	Pop.	±%
1960	9,756	—
1970	8,301	−14.9%
1980	8,347	+0.6%
1990	8,680	+4.0%
2000	8,609	−0.8%
2010	7,709	−10.5%
2020	6,612	−14.2%

== Education ==
Tateshina has one public elementary school and one public middle school operated by the town government, and one high school operated the Nagano Prefectural Board of Education.

== Transportation ==
=== Railway ===
- The town does not have any passenger rail service.

=== Highway ===
- National Route 142
- National Route 254

== Sister City ==
- (United States) - Oregon City, Oregon, USA, sister city

== Local attractions ==
- Ashida-shuku, post station on the Nakasendo
- Lake Megami
