= Ai no shuku =

Rest areas along pre-modern Japanese roads

Ai no Shuku (間の宿, mid-station) were unofficial post stations along historical routes in Japan. These post stations formed organically along routes (such as the Tōkaidō and the Nakasendō) when the distance between two places was too far or when there were difficult passes nearby. Because they were not officially designated rest areas, travelers along the roads were not allowed to stay in these post stations. Sometimes the Japanese is shortened to 間宿.

== Notable ai no shuku ==
=== Tōkaidō ===
- Ninomiya-shuku (二宮宿) (between Ōiso-juku and Odawara-juku) (Ninomiya, Kanagawa Prefecture)
- Hatake-shuku (畑宿) (between Odawara-juku and Hakone-juku) (Hakone, Kanagawa Prefecture)
- Iwabuchi-shuku (岩淵宿) (between Yoshiwara-juku and Kanbara-juku) (Fujikawa, Shizuoka Prefecture)
- Kikugawa-shuku (菊川宿) (between Kanaya-juku and Nissaka-shuku) (Shimada, Shizuoka Prefecture)
- Moto-juku (本宿) (between Akasaka-juku and Fujikawa-shuku) (Okazaki, Aichi Prefecture)
- Arimatsu-shuku (有松宿) (between Chiryū-juku and Narumi-juku) (Nagoya, Aichi Prefecture)

=== Nakasendō ===
- Fukiage-shuku (吹上宿) (between Kōnosu-shuku and Kumagai-shuku) (Kōnosu, Saitama Prefecture)
- Motai-shuku (茂田井宿) (between Mochizuki-shuku and Ashida-shuku) (Saku, Nagano Prefecture)
- Shinkanō-juku (新加納宿) (between Unuma-juku and Kanō-juku) (Kakamigahara, Gifu Prefecture)

=== Other routes ===
- Chino-shuku (茅野宿) (between the Kōshū Kaidō's Shimosuwa-shuku and Kanazawa-shuku) (Chino, Nagano Prefecture)
- Mahashi-shuku (馬橋宿) (between the Mito Kaidō's Matsudo-shuku and Kogane-shuku) (Matsudo, Chiba Prefecture)
- Funabashi-shuku (船橋宿) (between the Narita Kaidō's Ichikawa-shuku and Teradai-shuku) (Funabashi, Chiba Prefecture)

== See also ==
- Shukuba
- Kaidō
