= Kawasaki-juku =

Second of 53 stations of the Tōkaidō in Japan

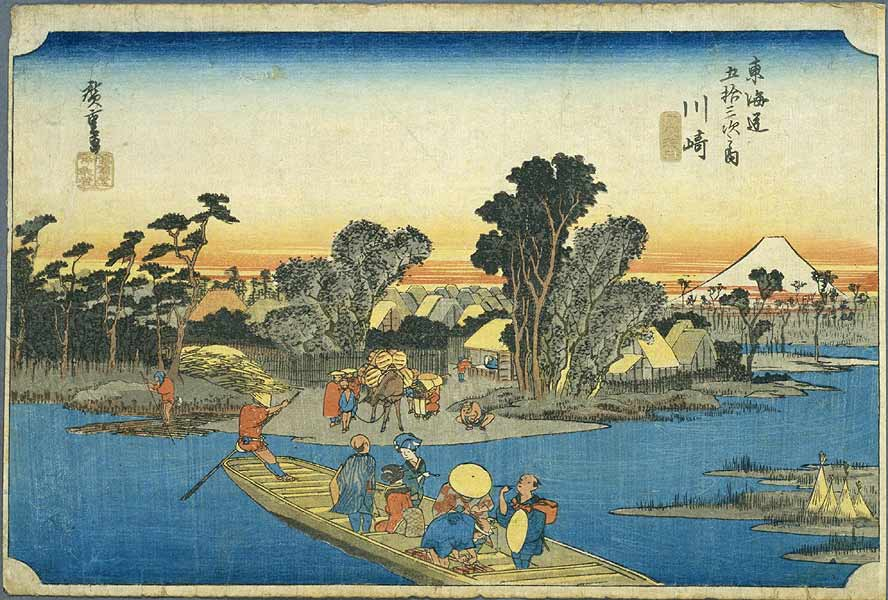
Kawasaki-juku in the 1830s, as depicted by Hiroshige in the Hōeidō edition of The Fifty-three Stations of the Tōkaidō (1831–1834)

Kawasaki-juku (川崎宿, Kawasaki-shuku) was the second of the fifty-three stations of the Tōkaidō. It is located in Kawasaki-ku in the present-day city of Kawasaki, Kanagawa Prefecture, Japan.

== History ==
Kawasaki-juku was established as a post station in 1623, by the local magistrate Koizumi Yoshikatsu. It was the last post station to be built along the Tōkaidō. It was located near Heiken-ji, a famous Buddhist temple, so it was often used by travelers coming to pray.

The classic ukiyo-e print by Andō Hiroshige (Hōeidō edition) from 1831–1834 depicts travelers in a ferry-boat crossing the Tama River, and passengers waiting on the further bank. Mount Fuji is depicted in the far distance.

== Neighboring post towns ==
Tōkaidō
Shinagawa-juku - Kawasaki-juku - Kanagawa-juku
