= 53 Stations of the Tōkaidō =

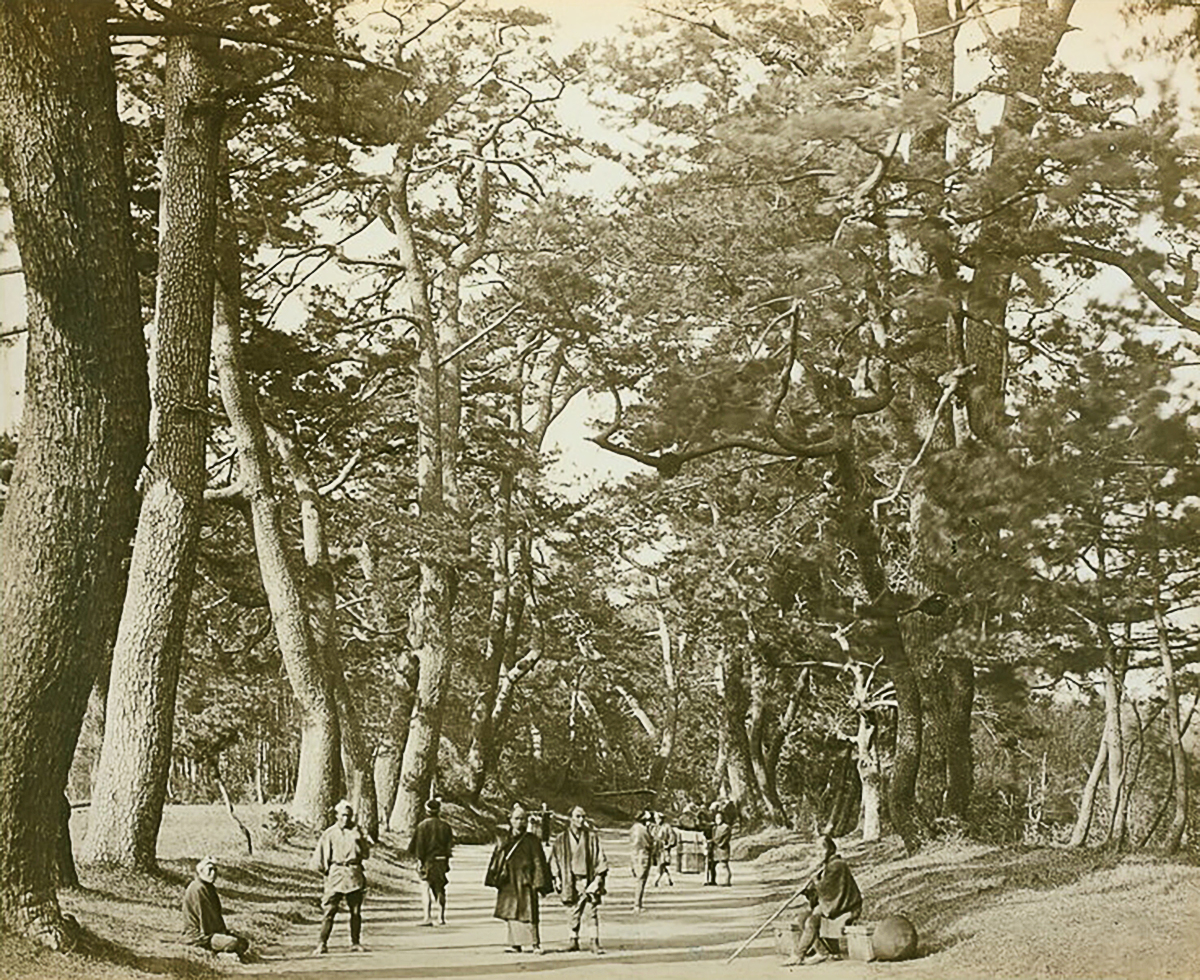
The Tōkaidō in 1865.

The 53 Stations of the Tōkaidō (東海道五十三次, Tōkaidō Gojūsan-tsugi) are the rest areas along the Tōkaidō, which was a coastal route that ran from Nihonbashi in Edo (modern-day Tokyo) to Sanjō Ōhashi in Kyoto. There were originally 53 government post stations along the Tōkaidō, where travelers had to present traveling permits at each station if wanting to cross.

In 1619, the Ōsaka Kaidō (大阪街道) was developed to extend the Tōkaidō so that it would reach Kōraibashi in modern-day Osaka. Instead of going to Sanjō Ōhashi, travelers would leave from Ōtsu-juku and travel towards Fushimi-juku. Because of the addition of these four post towns, the Tōkaidō is occasionally referred to as having 57 stations. Another name for this extension was Kyōkaidō (京街道).

The inland Nakasendō also started at Nihonbashi, and converged with the Tōkaidō at Kusatsu-juku. Shio no Michi intersected with the Tōkaidō at Okazaki-shuku.

== Stations of the Tōkaidō ==
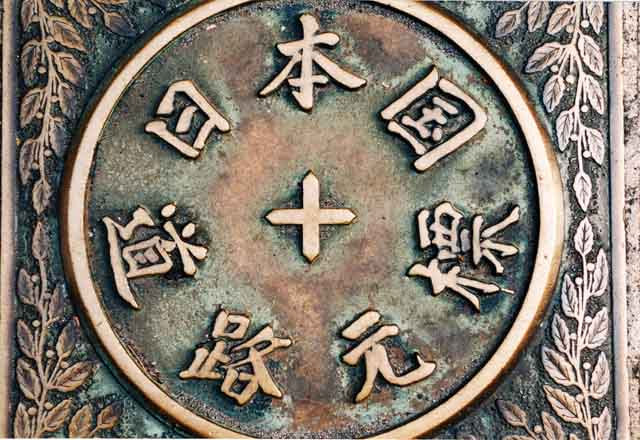
Nihonbashi's highway distance marker, from which modern highway distances are measured

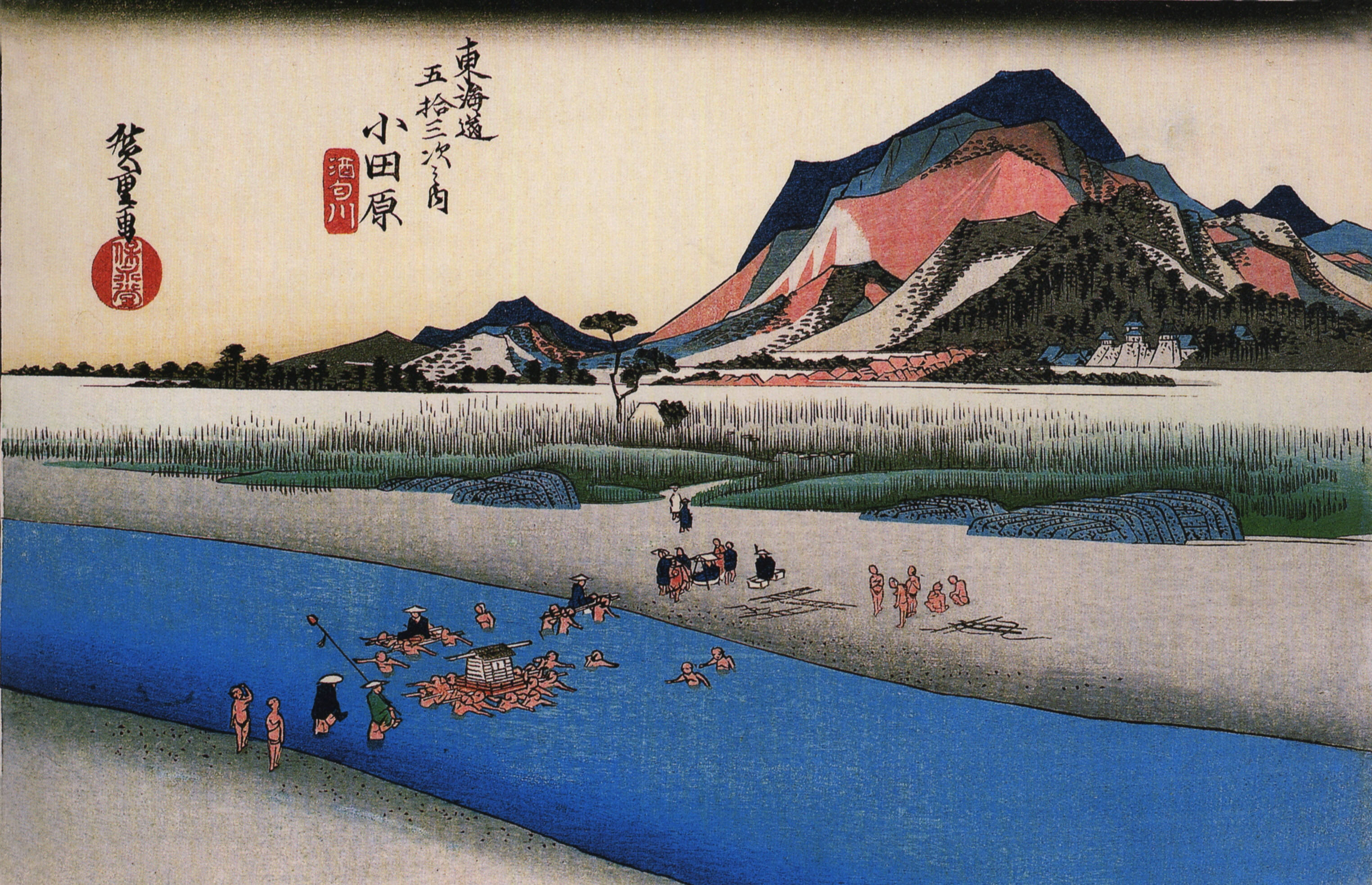
Odawara-juku in the 1830s, as depicted by Hiroshige in The Fifty-three Stations of the Tōkaidō

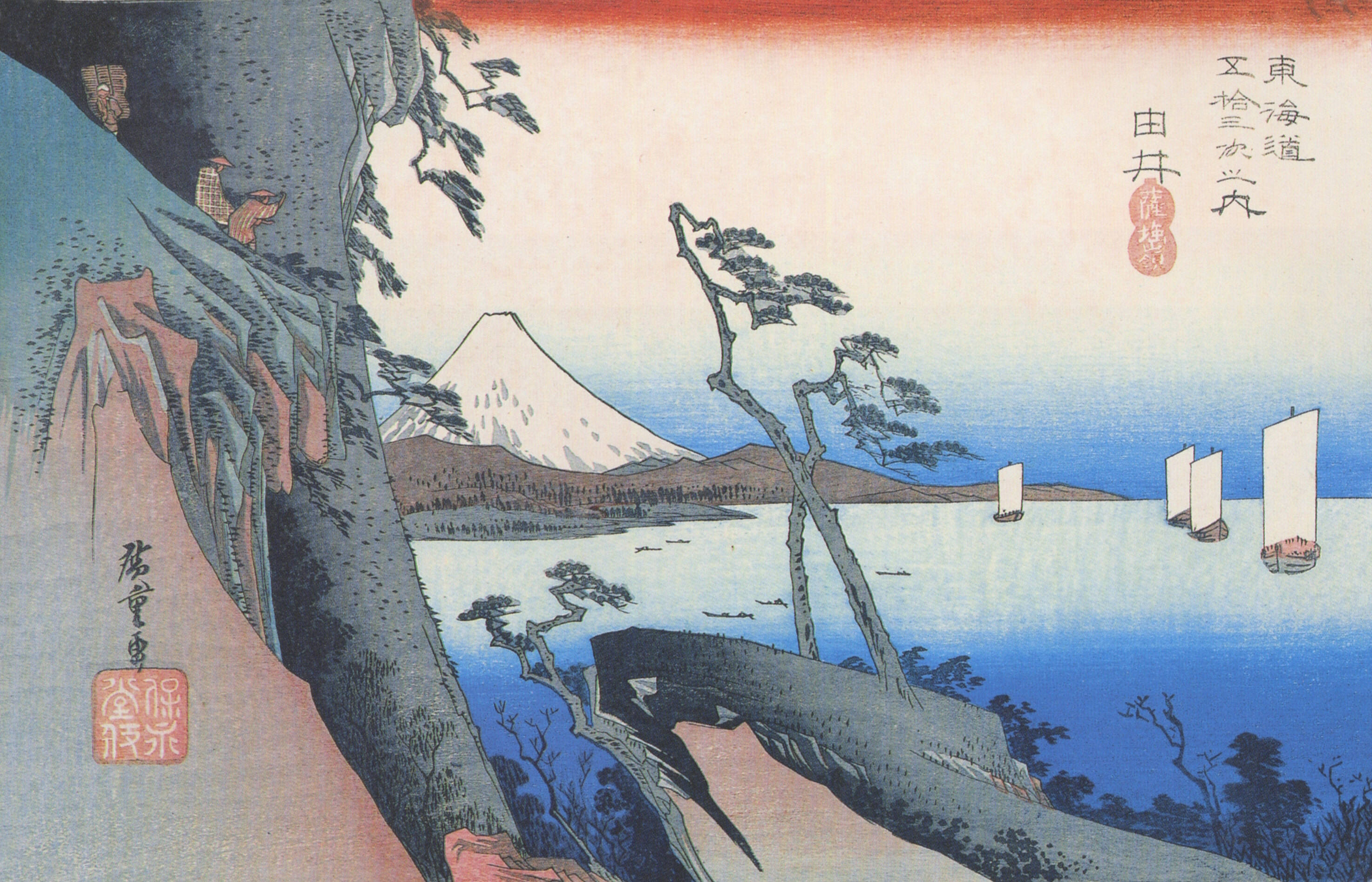
The countryside around Yui-shuku in the 1830s

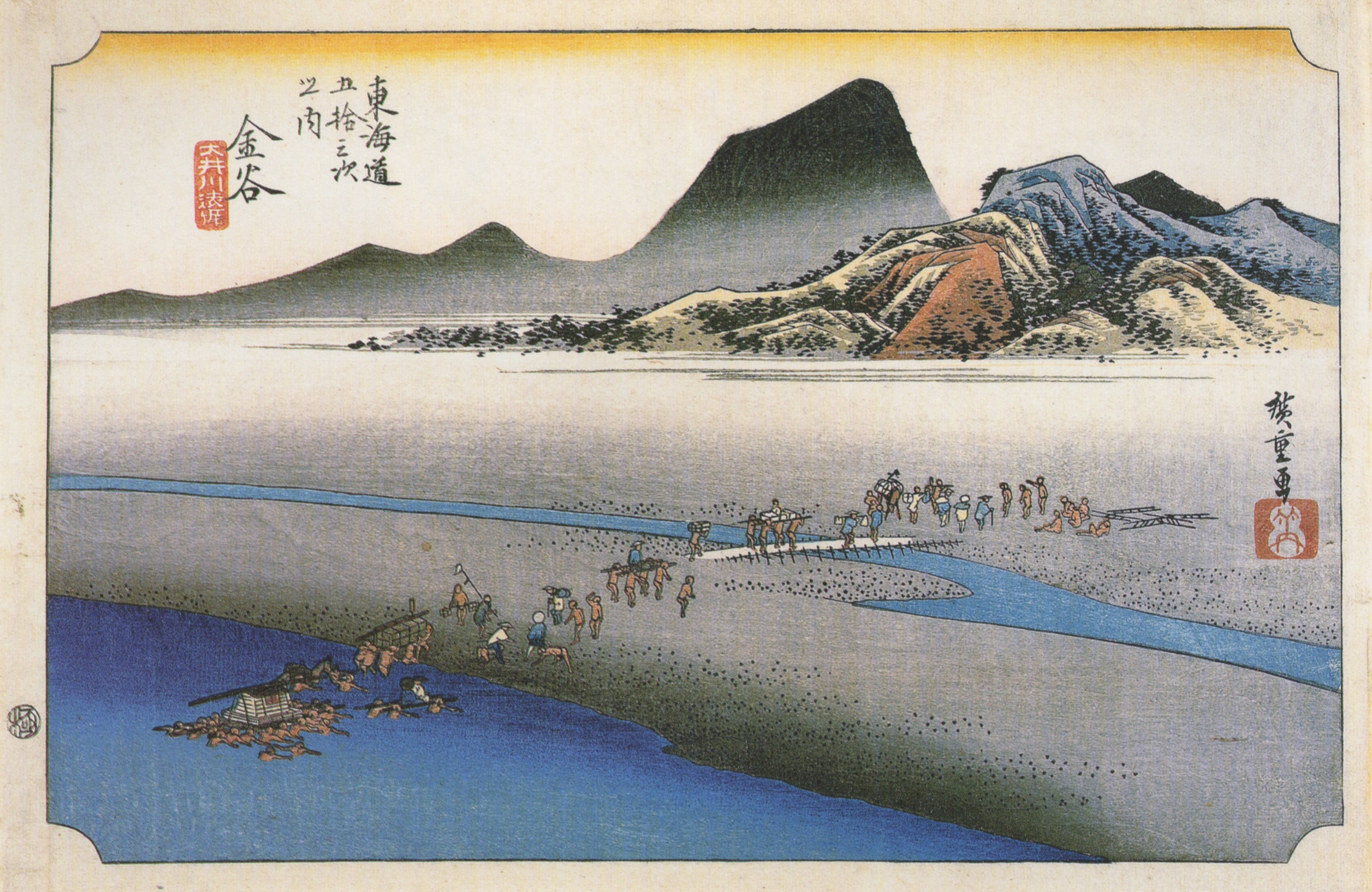
Kanaya-juku bordering the Ōi River in the 1830s

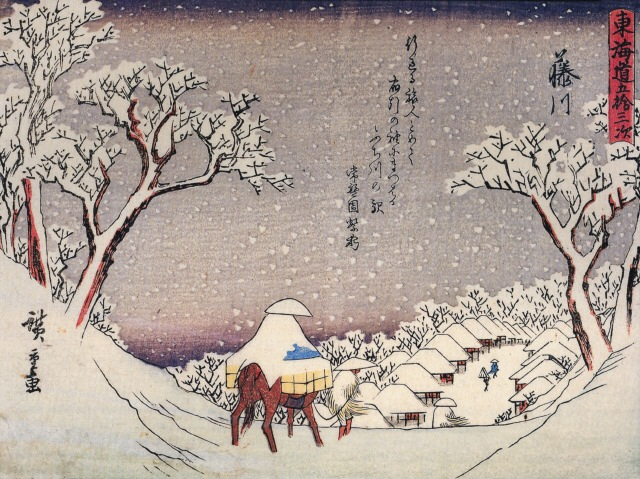
Fujikawa-shuku in the 1830s

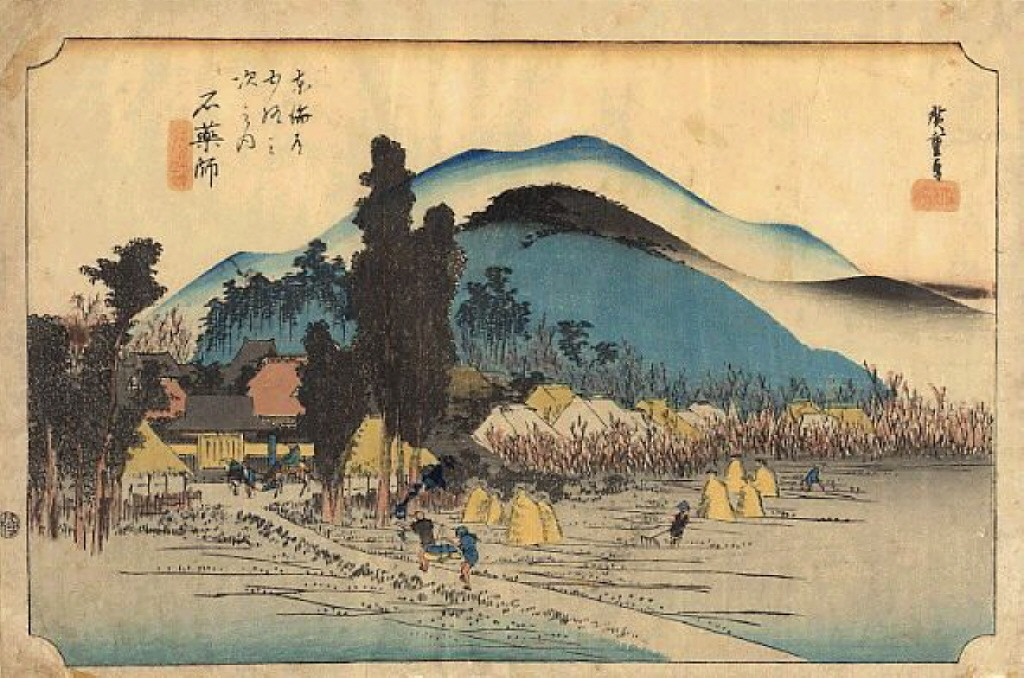
Ishiyakushi-juku in the 1830s

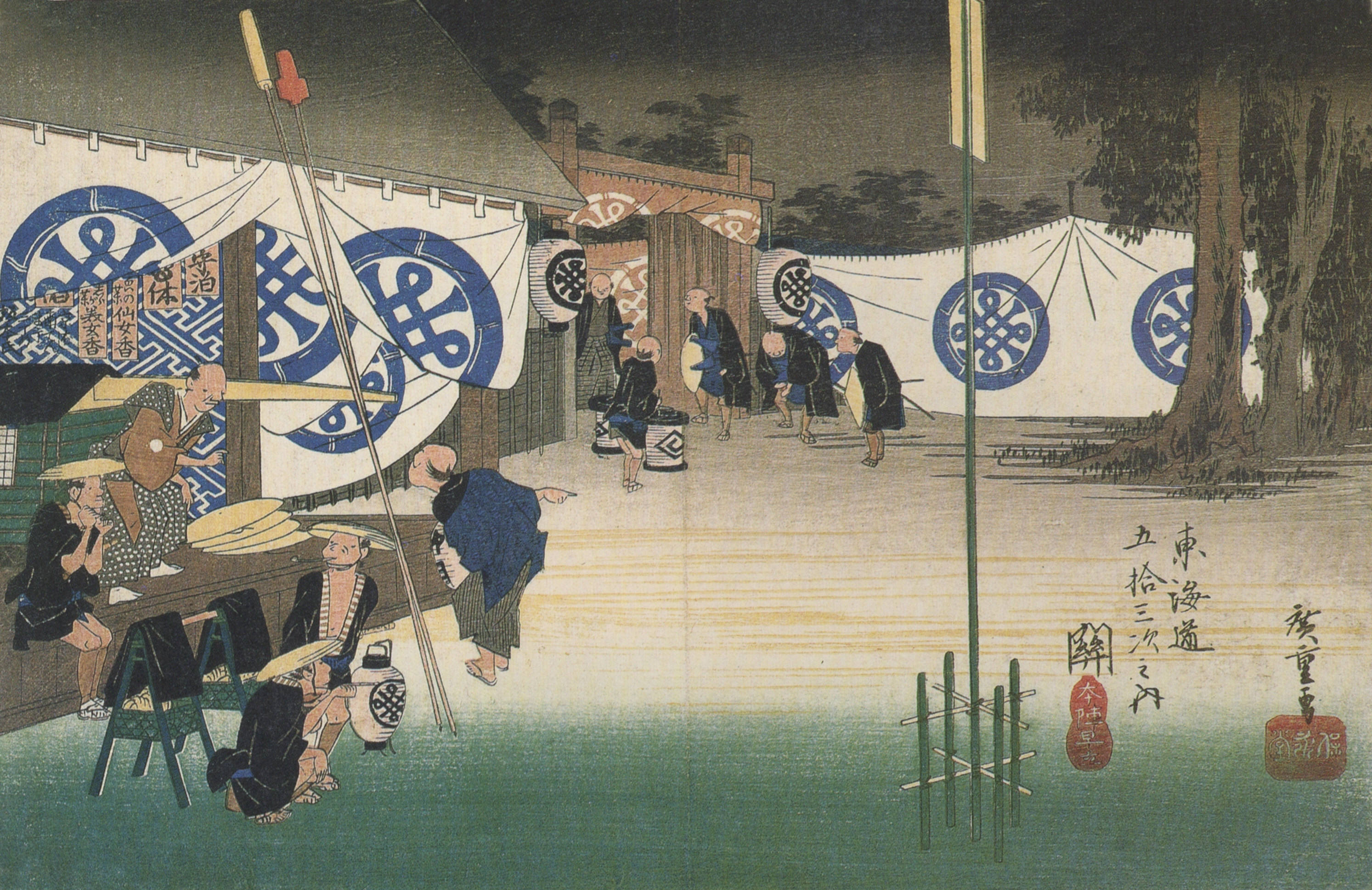
Seki-juku in the 1830s

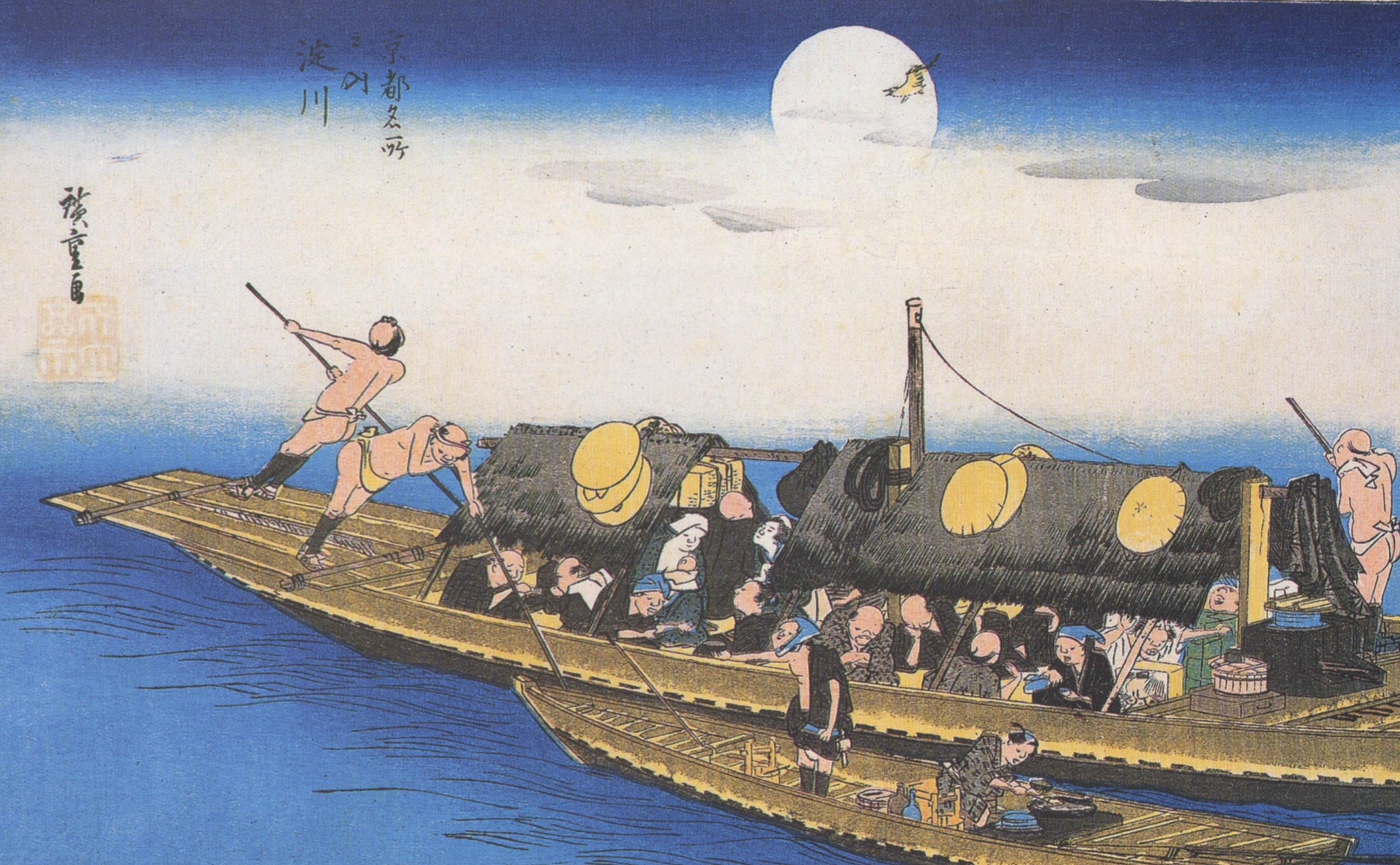
A boat going down the Yodo River towards Kōraibashi

No.	Name	Japanese	Station (km)	Distance (km)	Historical Location		Modern Location	
No.	Name	Japanese	Station (km)	Distance (km)	Province	District	Prefecture	Municipality
–	Nihonbashi	日本橋	0.0	0.0	Musashi	Toshima	Tokyo	Chūō
1	Shinagawa-juku	品川宿	7.9	7.9	Musashi	Ebara	Tokyo	Shinagawa
2	Kawasaki-juku	川崎宿	9.8	17.7	Musashi	Tachibana	Kanagawa	Kawasaki
3	Kanagawa-juku	神奈川宿	9.8	27.5	Musashi	Tachibana	Kanagawa	Yokohama
4	Hodogaya-juku	程ヶ谷宿	4.9	32.4	Musashi	Tachibana	Kanagawa	Yokohama
5	Totsuka-juku	戸塚宿	8.8	41.2	Sagami	Kamakura	Kanagawa	Yokohama
6	Fujisawa-shuku	藤沢宿	7.9	49.1	Sagami	Kōza	Kanagawa	Fujisawa
7	Hiratsuka-juku	平塚宿	13.7	62.8	Sagami	Ōsumi	Kanagawa	Hiratsuka
8	Ōiso-juku	大磯宿	2.9	65.8	Sagami	Yurugi	Kanagawa	Ōiso
9	Odawara-juku	小田原宿	15.7	81.5	Sagami	Ashinoshimo	Kanagawa	Odawara
10	Hakone-juku	箱根宿	16.6	98.1	Sagami	Ashinoshimo	Kanagawa	Hakone
11	Mishima-shuku	三島宿	14.8	112.9	Izu	Kimisawa	Shizuoka	Mishima
12	Numazu-juku	沼津宿	5.9	118.8	Suruga	Suntō	Shizuoka	Numazu
13	Hara-juku	原宿	5.9	124.7	Suruga	Suntō	Shizuoka	Numazu
14	Yoshiwara-juku	吉原宿	11.8	136.5	Suruga	Fuji	Shizuoka	Fuji
15	Kanbara-juku	蒲原宿	11.2	147.7	Suruga	Ihara	Shizuoka	Shizuoka
16	Yui-shuku	由比宿	3.9	151.6	Suruga	Ihara	Shizuoka	Shizuoka
17	Okitsu-juku	興津宿	9.2	160.8	Suruga	Ihara	Shizuoka	Shizuoka
18	Ejiri-juku	江尻宿	4.1	164.9	Suruga	Ihara	Shizuoka	Shizuoka
19	Fuchū-shuku	府中宿	10.6	175.5	Suruga	Udo	Shizuoka	Shizuoka
20	Mariko-juku	鞠子宿	5.7	181.2	Suruga	Udo	Shizuoka	Shizuoka
21	Okabe-juku	岡部宿	7.9	189.0	Suruga	Shida	Shizuoka	Fujieda
22	Fujieda-juku	藤枝宿	6.8	195.8	Suruga	Shida	Shizuoka	Fujieda
23	Shimada-juku	島田宿	8.7	204.5	Suruga	Shida	Shizuoka	Shimada
24	Kanaya-juku	金谷宿	3.9	208.4	Tōtōmi	Haibara	Shizuoka	Shimada
25	Nissaka-shuku	日坂宿	6.5	215.0	Tōtōmi	Saya	Shizuoka	Kakegawa
26	Kakegawa-juku	掛川宿	7.1	222.1	Tōtōmi	Saya	Shizuoka	Kakegawa
27	Fukuroi-juku	袋井宿	9.6	231.7	Tōtōmi	Yamana	Shizuoka	Fukuroi
28	Mitsuke-juku	見附宿	5.9	237.6	Tōtōmi	Iwata	Shizuoka	Iwata
29	Hamamatsu-juku	浜松宿	16.5	254.0	Tōtōmi	Fuchi	Shizuoka	Hamamatsu
30	Maisaka-juku	舞阪宿	10.9	265.0	Tōtōmi	Fuchi	Shizuoka	Hamamatsu
31	Arai-juku	新居宿	5.9	270.8	Tōtōmi	Fuchi	Shizuoka	Kosai
32	Shirasuka-juku	白須賀宿	6.5	277.4	Tōtōmi	Hamana	Shizuoka	Kosai
33	Futagawa-juku	二川宿	5.8	283.2	Mikawa	Atsumi	Aichi	Toyohashi
34	Yoshida-juku	吉田宿	6.1	289.3	Mikawa	Atsumi	Aichi	Toyohashi
35	Goyu-shuku	御油宿	10.3	299.5	Mikawa	Hoi	Aichi	Toyokawa
36	Akasaka-juku	赤坂宿	1.7	301.3	Mikawa	Hoi	Aichi	Toyokawa
37	Fujikawa-shuku	藤川宿	8.8	310.1	Mikawa	Nukata	Aichi	Okazaki
38	Okazaki-shuku	岡崎宿	6.7	316.8	Mikawa	Nukata	Aichi	Okazaki
39	Chiryū-juku	池鯉鮒宿	15.0	331.8	Mikawa	Hekikai	Aichi	Chiryū
40	Narumi-juku	鳴海宿	11.1	342.9	Owari	Aichi	Aichi	Nagoya
41	Miya-juku	宮宿	6.5	349.4	Owari	Aichi	Aichi	Nagoya
42	Kuwana-juku	桑名宿	27.5	376.9	Ise	Kuwana	Mie	Kuwana
43	Yokkaichi-juku	四日市宿	12.7	389.6	Ise	Mie	Mie	Yokkaichi
44	Ishiyakushi-juku	石薬師宿	10.8	400.4	Ise	Suzuka	Mie	Suzuka
45	Shōno-juku	庄野宿	2.7	403.1	Ise	Suzuka	Mie	Suzuka
46	Kameyama-juku	亀山宿	7.9	411.0	Ise	Suzuka	Mie	Kameyama
47	Seki-juku	関宿	5.9	416.9	Ise	Suzuka	Mie	Kameyama
48	Sakashita-juku	坂下宿	6.5	423.4	Ise	Suzuka	Mie	Kameyama
49	Tsuchiyama-juku	土山宿	9.8	433.2	Ōmi	Kōka	Shiga	Kōka
50	Minakuchi-juku	水口宿	10.6	443.8	Ōmi	Kōka	Shiga	Kōka
51	Ishibe-juku	石部宿	13.7	457.5	Ōmi	Kōka	Shiga	Konan
52	Kusatsu-juku	草津宿	11.8	469.3	Ōmi	Kurita	Shiga	Kusatsu
53	Ōtsu-juku	大津宿	14.4	483.7	Ōmi	Shiga	Shiga	Ōtsu
–	Sanjō Ōhashi	三条大橋	11.8	495.5	Yamashiro	Otagi	Kyoto	Kyoto
Ōsaka Kaidō (from Ōtsu-juku)
53	Ōtsu-juku	大津宿	0.0	483.7	Ōmi	Shiga	Shiga	Ōtsu
54	Fushimi-juku	伏見宿	16.6	500.3	Yamashiro	Kii	Kyoto	Kyoto
55	Yodo-juku	淀宿	5.5	505.8	Yamashiro	Kuse	Kyoto	Kyoto
56	Hirakata-juku	枚方宿	13.1	518.8	Kawachi	Matta	Osaka	Hirakata
57	Moriguchi-juku	守口宿	11.8	530.6	Kawachi	Matta	Osaka	Moriguchi
–	Kōraibashi	高麗橋	15.7	546.3	Settsu	Nishinari	Osaka	Osaka

== See also ==
- Edo Five Routes
  - 69 Stations of the Nakasendō
  - 44 Stations of the Kōshū Kaidō
  - 27 Stations of the Ōshū Kaidō
  - 21 Stations of the Nikkō Kaidō
- Other Routes
  - 17 Stations of the Hokkoku Kaidō
  - 11 Stations of the Kisoji
