= Fushimi-juku =

Fushimi-juku (伏見宿) is the name of two post stations in Japan during the Edo period.

- Fushimi-juku (Tōkaidō) was the fifty-fourth station on the Tōkaidō and the first station of the Ōsaka Kaidō
- Fushimi-juku (Nakasendō) was the fiftieth station on the Nakasendō
