= Kusatsu-juku =

Fifty-second of the 53 stations of the Tōkaidō

Kusatsu-juku 草津宿
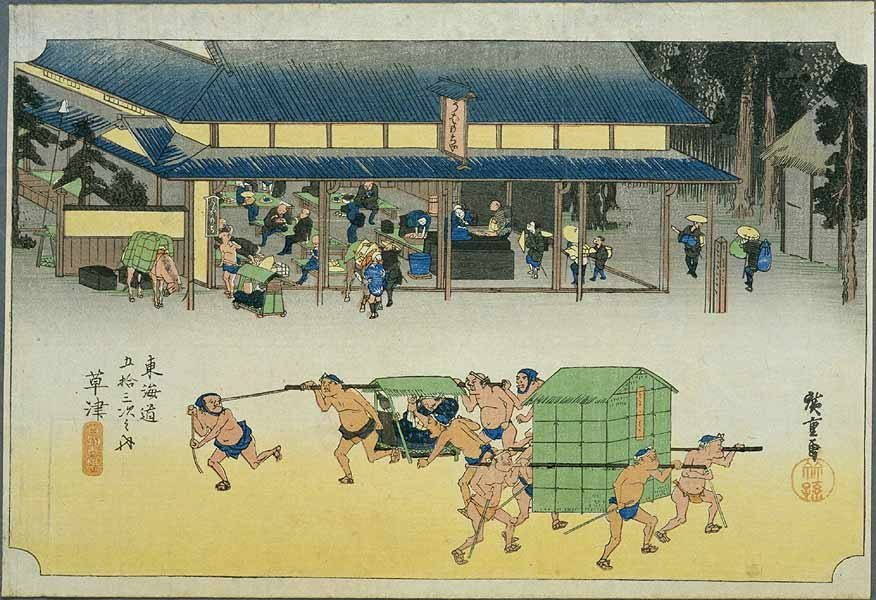
- Hiroshige's print of Kusatsu-juku, in the Sixty-nine Stations of the Kiso Kaidō series

General information
- Location: Kusatsu, Shiga (former Ōmi Province); Japan
- Coordinates: 35°01′03.6″N 135°57′37.7″E
- Elevation: 127 m (417 ft)
- System: post station
- Lines: Tōkaidō; Nakasendō
- Distance: 457.5 km from Edo
Location
- Location within Shiga Prefecture Location within Japan
Notes
- National Historic Site of Japan

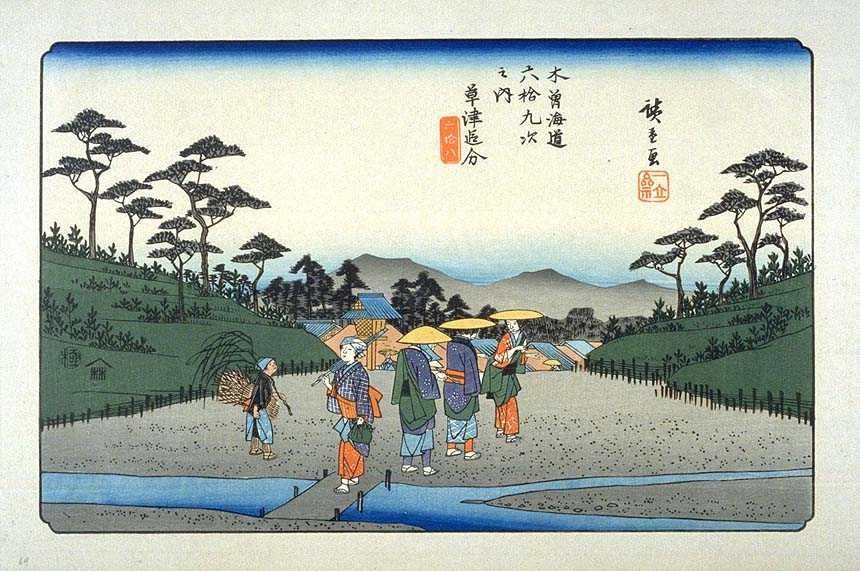
Hiroshige's print of Kusatsu-juku, part of the Sixty-nine Stations of the Kiso Kaidō series

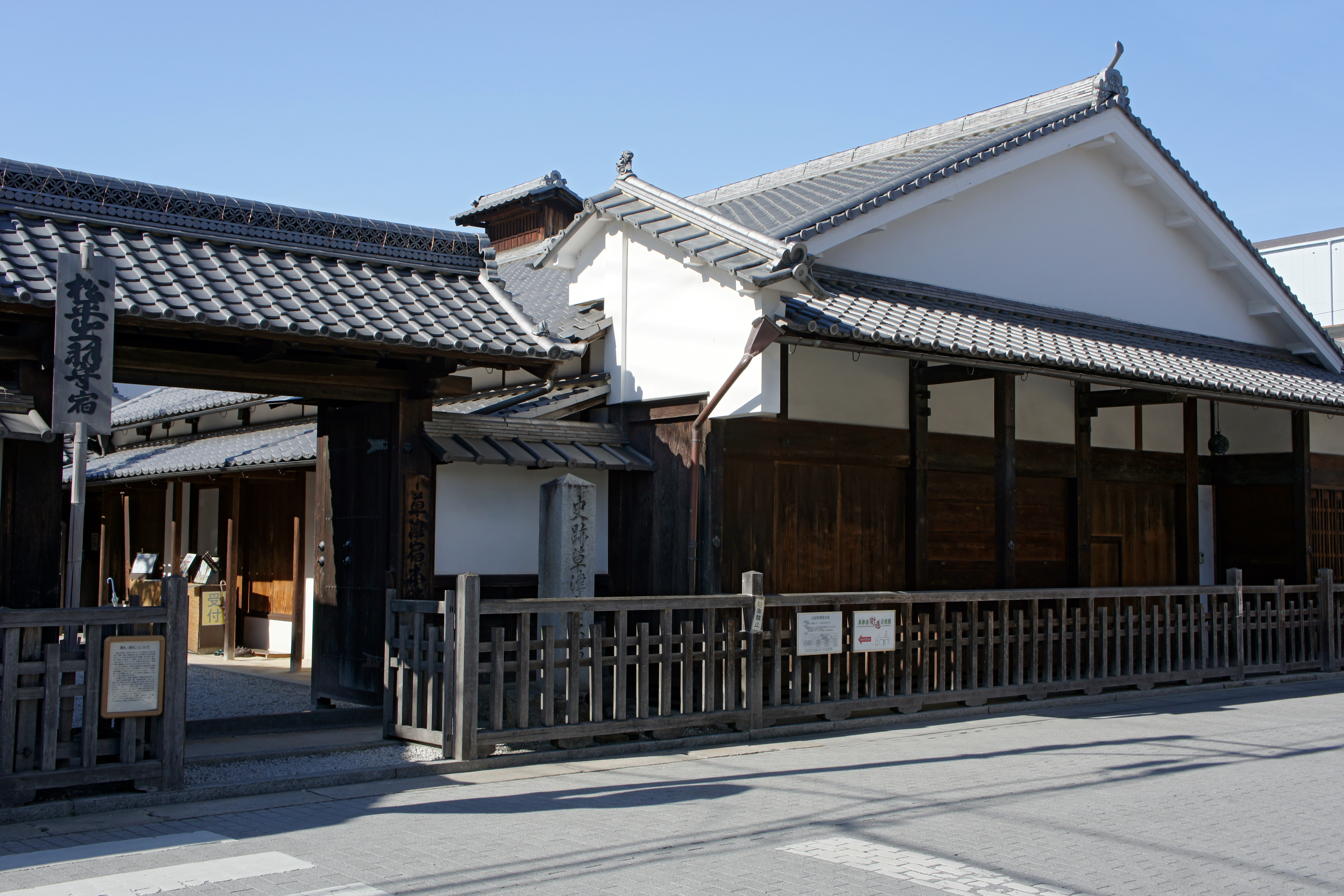
Kusatsu-juku's honjin

Kusatsu-juku (草津宿, Kusatsu-juku) was the fifty-second of the fifty-three stations of the Tōkaidō as well as the sixty-eighth of the sixty-nine stations of the Nakasendō. It is located in the downtown area of the present-day city of Kusatsu, Shiga Prefecture, Japan.

== History ==
Kusatsu has been a transportation hub for east–west travel on the ancient Tōsandō and Tōkaidō highways connecting the capital of Heian-kyō with the provinces of eastern Japan from the end of the Nara period onwards. During the Muromachi period, it developed as a relay point between Kyoto and the Ise Grand Shrines. In 1422, when Shogun Ashikaga Yoshimochi made a pilgrimage to Ise, he built a palace, the "Kusatsu Goshō" in this location. Around 1568, Oda Nobunaga forced Ashikaga Yoshiaki to cede the Kusatsu area, which he viewed as strategically critical to controlling the approaches to Kyoto. Nobunaga made extensive road repairs and reconstructed the Seta Bridge. In the early Edo period, the system of post stations on the Nakasendō and Tōkaidō was formalized by the Tokugawa shogunate in 1602. Kusatsu-juku developed at the junction of these two highways as a post town from around this time. It was on the sankin-kōtai route by the Kishū Tokugawa clan and other western daimyō to-and-from the Shogun's court in Edo.

Coming from Moriyama-juku, the borders of Kusatsu-juku started at the banks of the Kusatsu River and extended to the present-day Miya-chō in Kusatsu.Per the 1843 "東海道宿村大概帳" (Tōkaidō Shukuson Taigaichō) guidebook issued by the Inspector of Highways (道中奉行, Dōchu-būgyō), the town had a population of 2351 in 586 houses, including two honjin, two waki-honjin, and 72 hatago.

Of the two honjin, one was constructed in 1635 and stood until 1870. That honjin was later repaired and opened as a museum in 1996.

== Kusatsu-juku Honjin ==
Kusatsu-juku had two honjin, both of which were owned by the Tanaka family. The head of the family always had the name of "Tanaka Shichizaemon". One of the honjin was named the "Tanaka Shichizaemon Honjin" and since the family was also in the lumber business, the second was named the "Kiya Honjin" Only the "Tanaka Shichizaemon Honjin" survives and was designated as a National Historic Site in 1949. It covers a 4719 square meter site, with a floor area of 1547 square meters. It is adjacent to the Kusatsu River on one side, and protected by moats and high walls on the other sides.

The first honjin was built by the Tanaka Shichizaemon family in 1635. In June 1699, the two main players of the Akō incident, Kira Yoshinaka and Asano Naganori stayed at the same honjin but only nine days apart. This was three years before the famous vendetta. Kira Yoshinaka had stayed at the honjin on several occasions (the last of which was in 1701) as his official duties required him to visit Kyoto or the Ise Grand Shrine on occasion. However, the building where they stayed was destroyed in a fire which swept through Kusatsu-juku in 1718, and the current buildings were constructed shortly after that disaster. Another crisis occurred in 1839, when Shimazu Tadayuki, daimyō of Sadowara Domain died of illness at the Tanaka Shichizaemon Honjin while on sankin-kōtai. As he had no heir, this placed the domain in imminent danger of attainder, and Tanaka Shichizaemon assisted the Shimazu clan in concealing the death from officials of the Tokugawa shogunate for over two months, claiming that the daimyō was simply resting. In 1861, Princess Kazu-no-miya had breakfast at the honjin while en route to Edo to marry Shogun Tokugawa Iemochi and in September 1868, Emperor Meiji stopped for lunch at the honjin en route to Tokyo, but neither spend the night. The honjin was closed in 1870. From July 1947, it was used as a local community center. In April 1996, it was reopened to the public as a museum. It is located about a ten-minute walk from Kusatsu Station on the JR West Biwako Line.

== Kusatsu-juku in The Sixty-nine Stations of the Kiso Kaidō ==
Utagawa Hiroshige's ukiyo-e print of Kusatsu-juku dates from 1835 -1838. The print depicts a woman crossing a narrow wooden footbridge across the Kusatsu River, depicted here as little more than a small creek. He is a local resident, as she has a rolled up parasol in one hand and a furoshiki in the other, indicating that she is on a social call. Heading in the opposite direct behind her are three women in traveling attire, with a child wood gathering trailing behind them. A large lantern marks the entrance to the post station, whose tiled roofs are visible. In the background is the mass of Mount Hiei.

== Kusatsu-juku in The Fifty-three Stations of the Tōkaidō ==
Utagawa Hiroshige's ukiyo-e Hōeidō edition print of Kusatsu-juku dates from 1833 -1834. The print depicts a busy scene within the post station itself in front of the open-fronted Yōrō-tei (養老亭) tea house in which many patrons are enjoying Ubagamochi (姥が餅), a sweetened sticky rice cake which was a speciality of Kusatsu-juku. The tea house was so named by Tokugawa Ieyasu after he stopped here following his victory at the Battle of Sekigahara and was presented with a rice cake by proprietor, an 84-year old former wet nurse of the Sasaki clan who had escaped the destruction of her clan at the hands of Oda Nobunaga. Afterwards, the tea house was mentioned by Matsuo Basho, Yosa Buson and other noted travelers. In front of the tea house, on the highway itself, a passenger in an open kago (palanquin) holds on to a rope as the porters rush to his destination, while a larger, covered kago, presumably for a high status passenger, heads in the opposite direction.

== Neighboring post towns ==
Nakasendō
Moriyama-juku - Kusatsu-juku - Ōtsu-juku
Tōkaidō
Ishibe-juku - Kusatsu-juku - Ōtsu-juku
