= Yodo-juku =

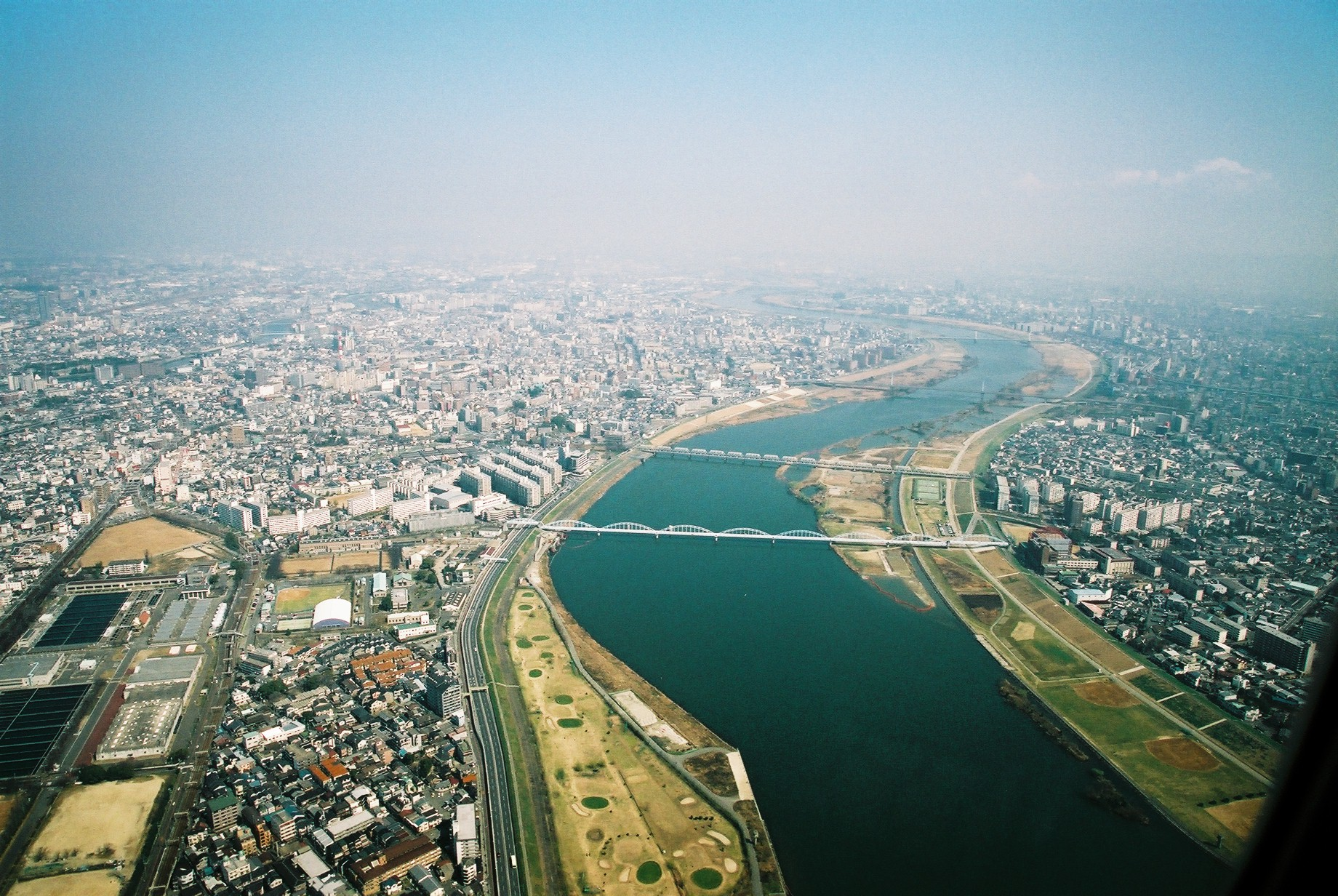
The Yodo River

Yodo-juku (淀宿, Yodo-juku) was the second station on the Ōsaka Kaidō (or fifty-fifth of the fifty-seven stations of the Tōkaidō). It is located in the southern part of Fushimi-ku in the present-day city of Kyoto, Kyoto Prefecture, Japan.

== History ==
Located between the Yodo and Katsura rivers, Yodo-juku was founded in 1619. During the Edo period, it was part of the castle town that surrounded Yodo Castle, which was constructed in 1623.

== Neighboring post towns ==
Ōsaka Kaidō (extended Tōkaidō)
Fushimi-juku – Yodo-juku – Hirakata-juku
