= Ishibe-juku =

Fifty-first of the 53 stations of the Tōkaidō

Ishibe-juku 石部宿
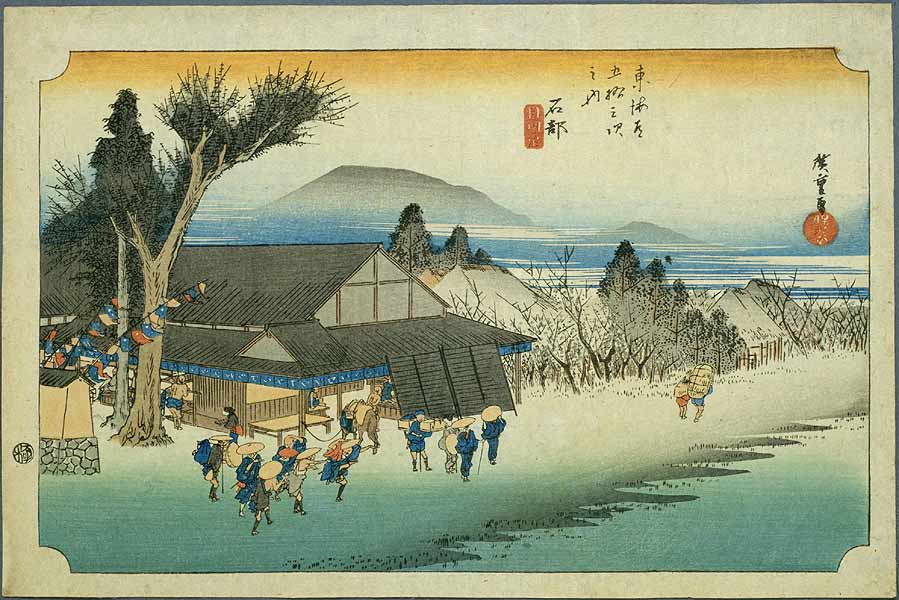
- Hiroshige's print of Ishibe-juku, part of the Hōeidō edition The Fifty-three Stations of the Tōkaidō series

General information
- Location: Konan, Shiga (former Ōmi Province); Japan
- Coordinates: 35°00′37.57″N 136°03′17.58″E
- Elevation: 127 m (417 ft)
- System: post station
- Line: Tōkaidō
- Distance: 457.5 km from Edo
Location
- Location within Shiga Prefecture Location within Japan

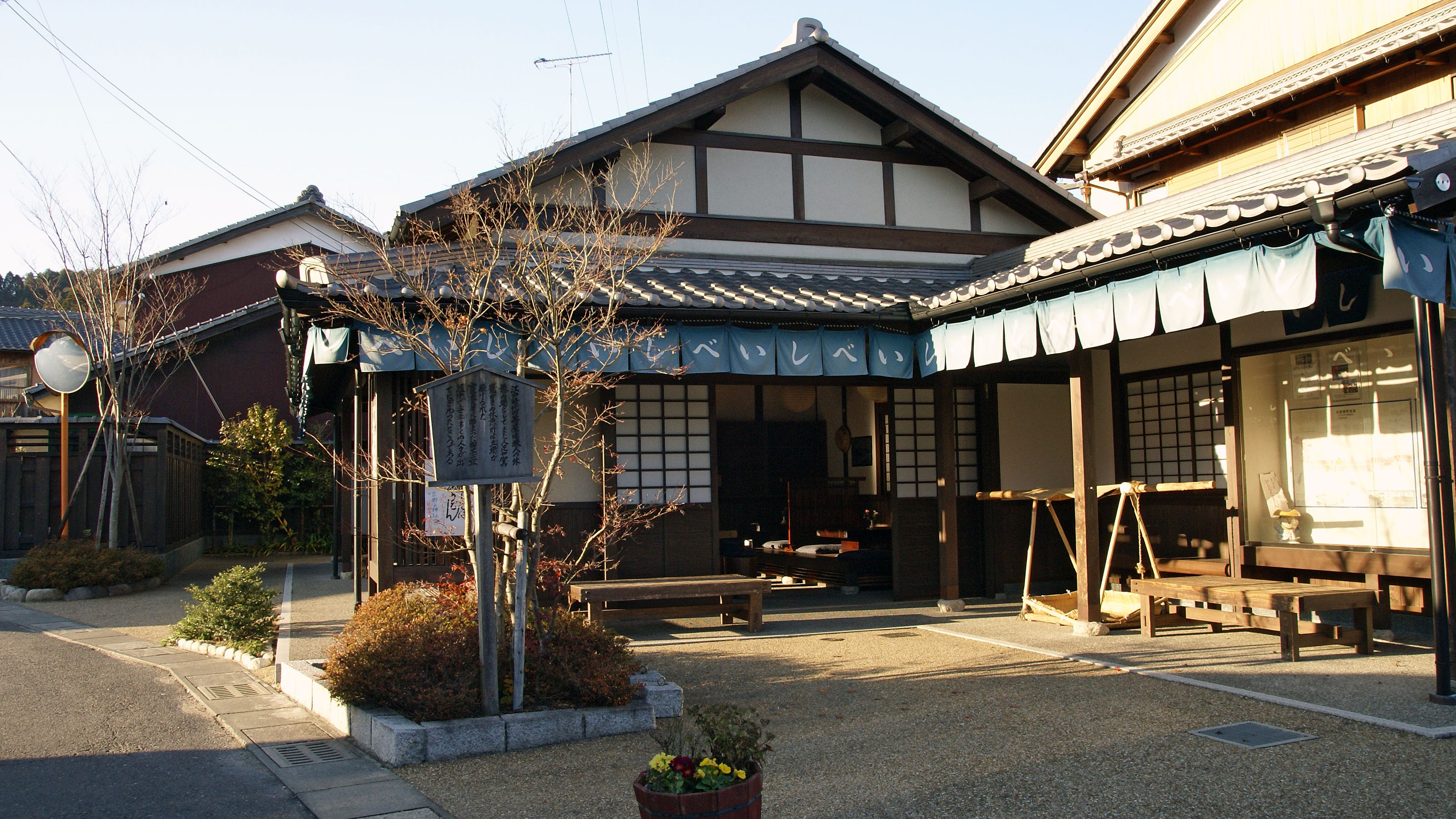
Reconstructed building based on Hiroshige's print

Ishibe-juku (石部宿) was the fifty-first of the fifty-three stations of the Tōkaidō highway connecting Edo with Kyoto in Edo period Japan. It was located in the present-day city of Konan, Shiga Prefecture, Japan.

== History ==
Ishibe-juku was originally formed in 1571, when Oda Nobunaga formed the town of Ishibe (石部町 Ishibe-machi) by joining the five nearby hamlets. In 1597, Toyotomi Hideyoshi further developed the post station to be used for the shipment of goods by travelers on their way to Zenkō-ji In Shinano Province. In the early Edo period, the system of post stations on the Tōkaidō was formalized by the Tokugawa shogunate in 1601, Ishibe-juku became an official post station. It was on the sankin-kōtai route by many western daimyō to-and-from the Shogun's court in Edo. Ishibe-juku was a popular as the first night's stop for travelers en route from Kyoto to Edo. It is 457.5 kilometers from Edo and 38 kilometers from Kyoto.

Per the 1843 "東海道宿村大概帳" (Tōkaidō Shukuson Taigaichō) guidebook issued by the Inspector of Highways (道中奉行, Dōchu-būgyō), the town had a population of 929 in 458 houses, including two honjin (the Kojima Honjin and the Sandaiji Honjin), and 32 hatago, and extended for 1.6 kilometers along the highway. It had one toiya, for the stabling of packhorses and warehousing of goods, and one kōsatsu for the display of official notifications.

In 1864, Shogun Tokugawa Iemochi, stayed at Ishibe-juku, though his visit was preceded in 1863 by Tokugawa Yoshinobu, who later became the fifteenth and final shōgun of Japan. Both stayed at the Kojima-honjin.

== Modern Ishiba-juku ==
Modern Ishibe-juku is poorly-preserved, as most of its buildings have been lost to modern redevelopment. The Ishibashuku-no-sato (石部宿場の里) is an open-air museum with a number of preserved and reconstructed farmhouses, tea houses and shops. It is connected with the Tōkaidō Ishibe Historical Museum (東海道石部宿歴史民俗資料館, Tōkaidō ishibeshuku rekishi minzoku shiryōkan) operated by Konan City. Both facilities are located a couple of kilometers from the site of the original Ishiba-juku.

== Ishibe-juku in The Fifty-three Stations of the Tōkaidō ==
Utagawa Hiroshige's ukiyo-e Hōeidō edition print of Ishibe-juku dates from 1833–1834. The print does not actually show the post station at all, but instead shows a tea house called "Ise-ya", located at "Megawa no Sato", which was on the highway between Kusatsu-juku and Ishiba-juku, but actually closer to Kusatsu-juku. This shop was famous for its tokoroten, a gelatinous sweet made from agar, and kuromitsu, a black sugar syrup. A group of travelers are dancing and cavorting in front of the shop while three women with traveling hats and walking sticks look on in amusement. A couple of other travelers, heavily laden, are some distance further down the road.

== Neighboring post towns ==
Tōkaidō
Minakuchi-juku – Ishibe-juku – Kusatsu-juku
