= Ōtsu-juku =

Last station of the Tōkaidō and the Nakasendō

Ōtsu-juku 大津宿
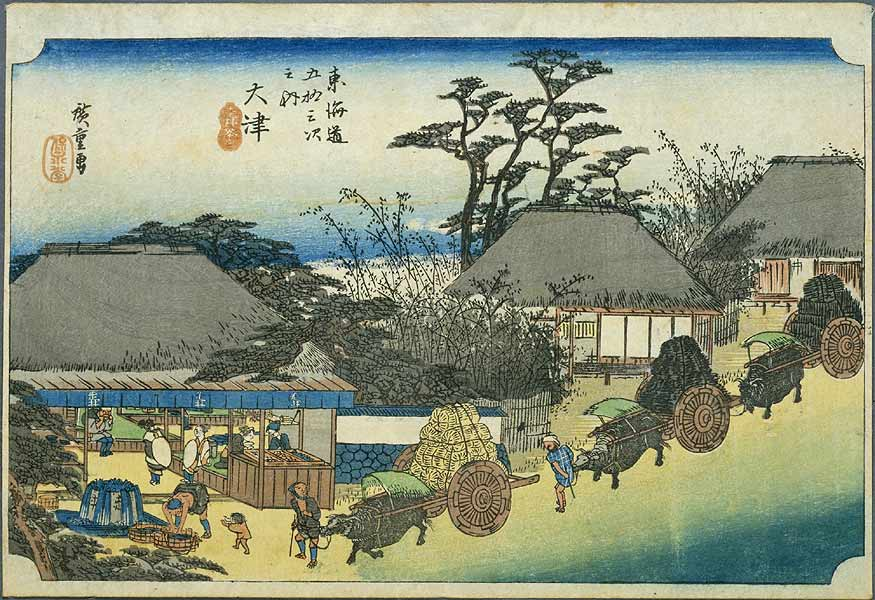
- Hiroshige's print of Ōtsu-juku, in The Fifty-three Stations of the Tōkaidō series

General information
- Location: Ōtsu, Shiga (former Ōmi Province); Japan
- Coordinates: 35°00′21.5″N 135°51′41.1″E
- Elevation: 105 m (344 ft)
- System: post station
- Lines: Tōkaidō; Nakasendō
- Distance: 495.5 km from Edo
Location
- Location within Shiga Prefecture Location within Japan

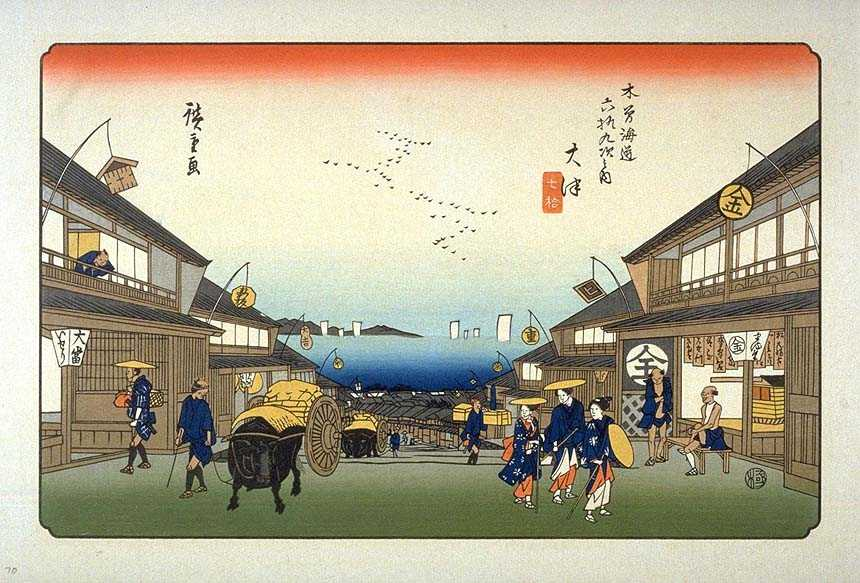
Hiroshige's print of Ōtsu-juku, part of the Sixty-nine Stations of the Kiso Kaidō series

Ōtsu-juku (大津宿, Ōtsu-juku) was the last of the sixty-nine stations of the Nakasendō, as well as the last of the fifty-three stations of the Tōkaidō. It was 14 km (9 mi) from the previous post town, Kusatsu-juku, and was located in Ōmi Province. It is currently located in the present-day city of Ōtsu, Shiga Prefecture, Japan.

== History ==
The road through Ōtsu-juku is flat and runs along the bank of Lake Biwa, passing the jōkamachi of Zeze Domain. Before entering Ōtsu-juku, the road made several double-bends intended to slow down any attacker in front of Zeze Castle. Ōtsu had been the capital of Japan briefly in the 7th century and was an important town due to its location on the outlet Lake Biwa via the Seta River, which becomes the "Uji River" is Kyoto and the "Yodo River" in Osaka. A famous ancient Chinese-style bridge crossed the river at this point. This bridge was much celebrated in literature and marked the edge of the capital region.

Per the 1843 "東海道宿村大概帳" (Tōkaidō Shukuson Taigaichō) guidebook issued by the Inspector of Highways (道中奉行, Dōchu-būgyō), the town had a population of 14,892 in 350 houses, including two honjin, one waki-honjin, and 71 hatago.

Ōtsu-juku was also the starting point for the Ōsaka Kaidō, an extension of the Tōkaidō which bypassed Kyoto and passed through Fushimi, Hirakata and Moriguchi to central Osaka.

== Ōtsu-juku in The Sixty-nine Stations of the Kiso Kaidō ==
Utagawa Hiroshige's ukiyo-e print of Ōtsu-juku dates from 1835–1838. The print depicts the main street of Ōtsu-juku, Hacho-dori, which slopes down to Lake Biwa. Heavily-laden oxcarts are ascending the street, which draw the attention of three traveling women heading in the opposite direction. The opened-fronted shop of the left contains a kago (palanquin), with two bearers in front, hoping for customers. The shops on both sides of the street have signs with various letters or symbols representing Hiroshige and/or his publisher. Overhead, migrating flocks of birds indicate that the scene is set in autumn.

== Ōtsu-juku in The Fifty-three Stations of the Tōkaidō ==
Utagawa Hiroshige's ukiyo-e Hōeidō edition print of Ōtsu-juku dates from 1833–1834. The print again depicts oxcarts, heavily laden with bushels of rice or charcoal, but this time descending the street. The oxcarts pass in front of the open front of the Hashirii teahouse, which was a popular resting point on the highway, and which served Hashirii Mochi (走り井餅), sweet rice cake which remains a local specialty of Ōtsu to this day. In front of the teahouse is a well from which fresh water gushes out. The Hashirii teahouse survived to the early Meiji period, and was later purchased for use as a villa by the nihonga painter Hashimoto Kansetsu in 1915. After his death, it became a Bushiest temple called Gesshin-ji. It is located between Oiwake Station and Ōtani Station on the Keihan Keishin Line.

== Neighboring post towns ==
Nakasendō & Tōkaidō
Kusatsu-juku - Ōtsu-juku - Sanjō Ōhashi
Ōsaka Kaidō (extended Tōkaidō)
Kusatsu-juku - Ōtsu-juku - Fushimi-juku
