= Shinagawa-juku =

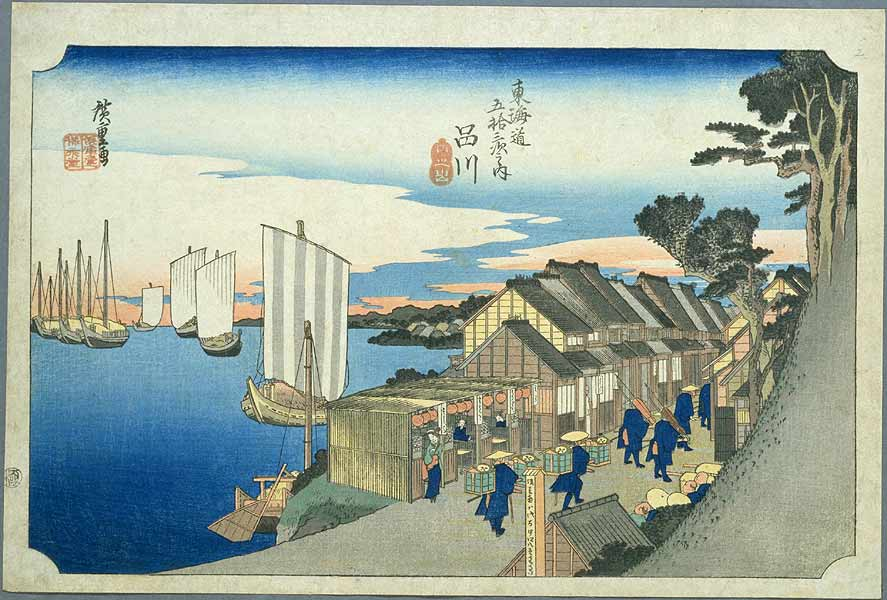
Shinagawa-juku in the 1830s, as depicted by Hiroshige in The Fifty-three Stations of the Tōkaidō

Shinagawa-shuku (品川宿, Shinagawa-shuku) was one of the fifty-three stations of the Tōkaidō. It is located in Shinagawa, Tokyo, Japan. Along with Itabashi-shuku (Nakasendō), Naitō Shinjuku (Kōshū Kaidō) and Senju-shuku (Nikkō Kaidō and Ōshū Kaidō), it was one of the Four Stations of Edo (江戸四宿 Edo Shishuku). It was located in the present-day Shinagawa Port area near Shinagawa Station.

== Neighboring post towns ==
Tōkaidō
Nihonbashi (starting point) - Shinagawa-juku - Kawasaki-juku
