= Stone routes =

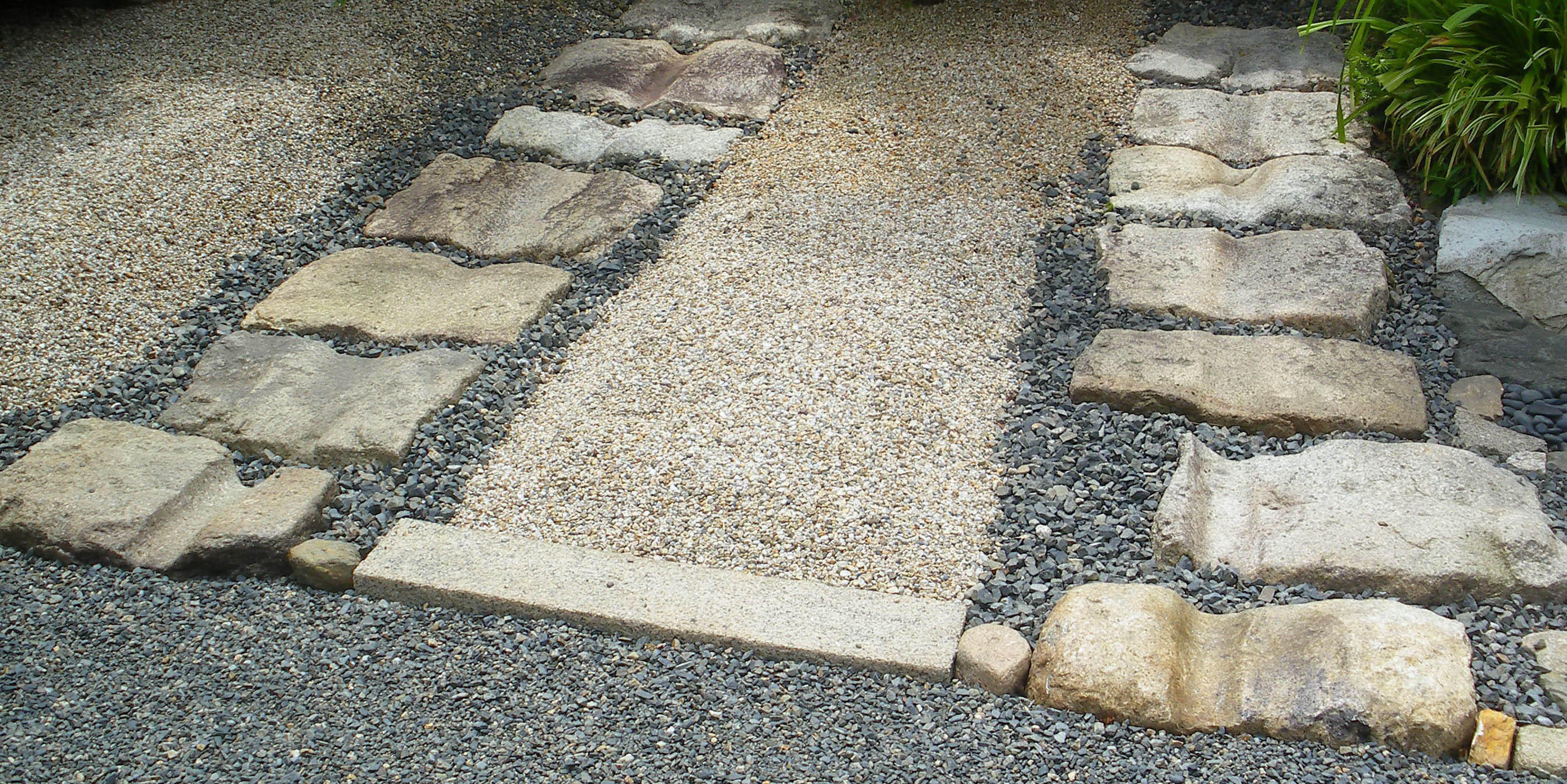
The stone route reconstructed at Kansei Temple (Japanese: 閑栖寺) in Otsu, Shiga, Japan

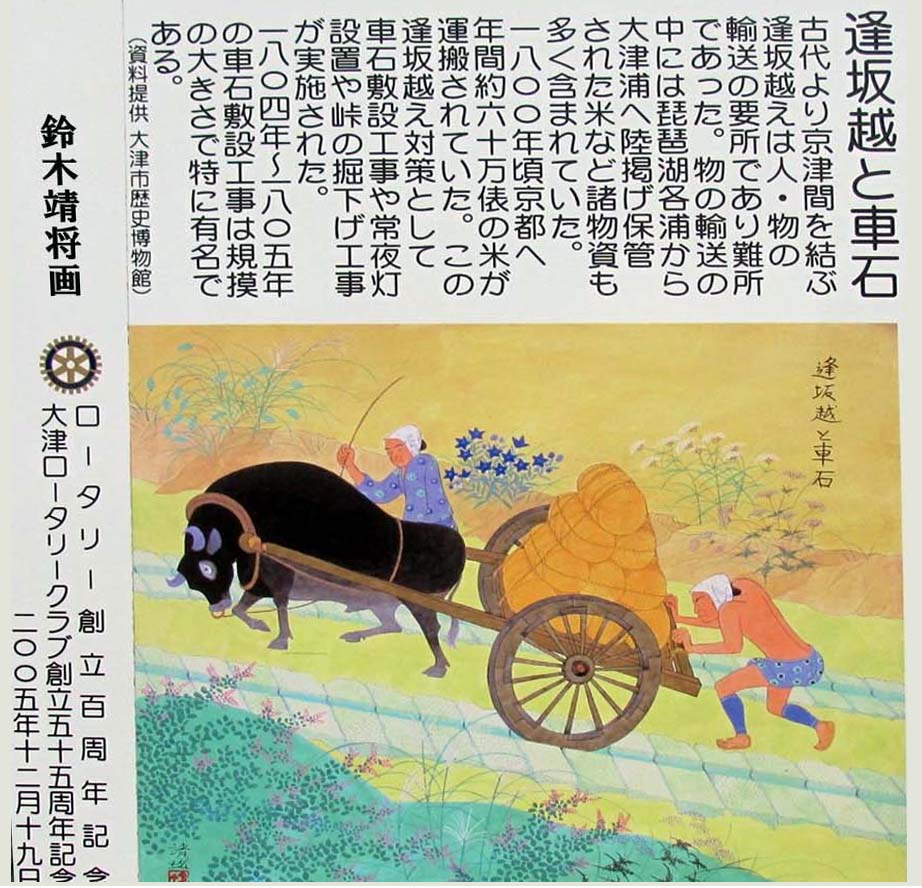
An ox-drawn cart on the stone route over the Osaka mountain pass (逢坂峠) of the Tokaido Highway (From the stele erected at Ōtsu Station Plaza.

The Stone routes (Japanese: 車道 = Kuruma-michi), also called the Vehicle stones (Japanese: 車石 = Kuruma-ishi), were a pair of stone-paved "rails" that were placed on either sides of the three main highways leading to Kyoto, Japan, so that the oxcarts could ride on them during the 18th–19th century of the Edo period.

== Overview ==
Since Kyoto was located in the interior of Honshu island, unlike Tokyo and Osaka, it was difficult to cart materials into the city. During the 18th–19th century during the Edo period, the stone routes were placed on the side of the three main highways leading to Kyoto, so that oxcarts or bullock carts could ride on them, especially useful over the mountain passes when it rained and would have caused muddy conditions.

A stone route was typically 2.7 meters (9 shaku) wide, with the two rows of stones of 30 cm x 60 cm × 25 cm size on both sides and a 90 cm (3 shaku) wide center for the bulls to walk. When the railways were introduced in the 19th century, the vehicle stone were dismantled and used for other purposes and, therefore, they came to mean the stone routes.

The three highways were: the Tokaido, Takeda-Kaido (竹田街道) and Toba-Kaido (鳥羽街道).

In 2013, the Association of Vehicle Stones and Stone Routes Research (Japanese: 車石・車道研究会) was established.
