= Shukuba =

Post stations of Japan in the Edo period

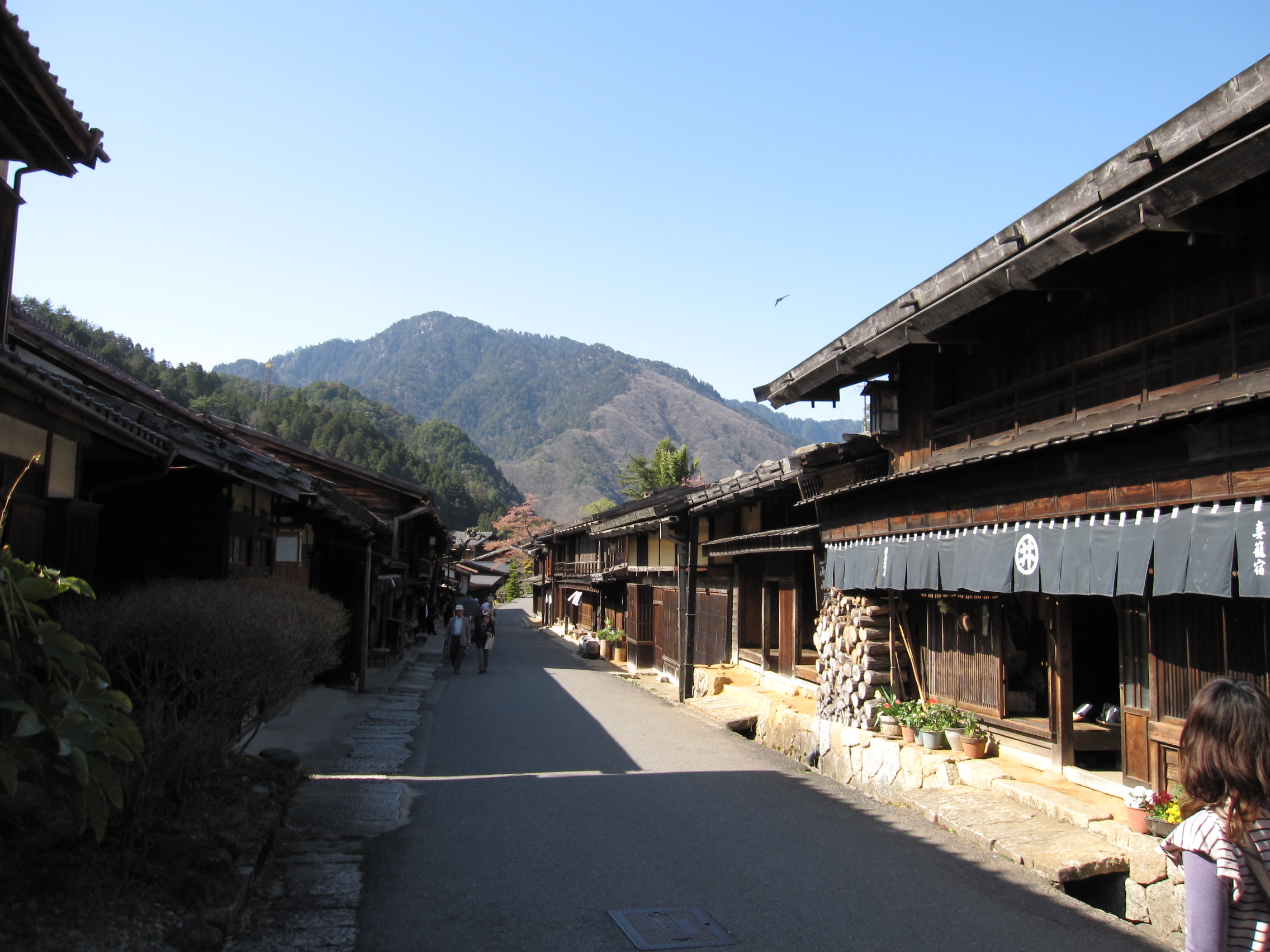
Nakasendō's Tsumago-juku

Shukuba (宿場) were staging post stations during the Edo period in Japan, generally located on one of the Edo Five Routes or one of its sub-routes. They were also called shuku-eki (宿駅). These stage stations, or "stage station towns (宿場町, shukuba-machi)" developed around them, were places where travelers could rest on their journey around the nation. They were created based on policies for the transportation of goods by horseback that were developed during the Nara and Heian periods.

== History ==
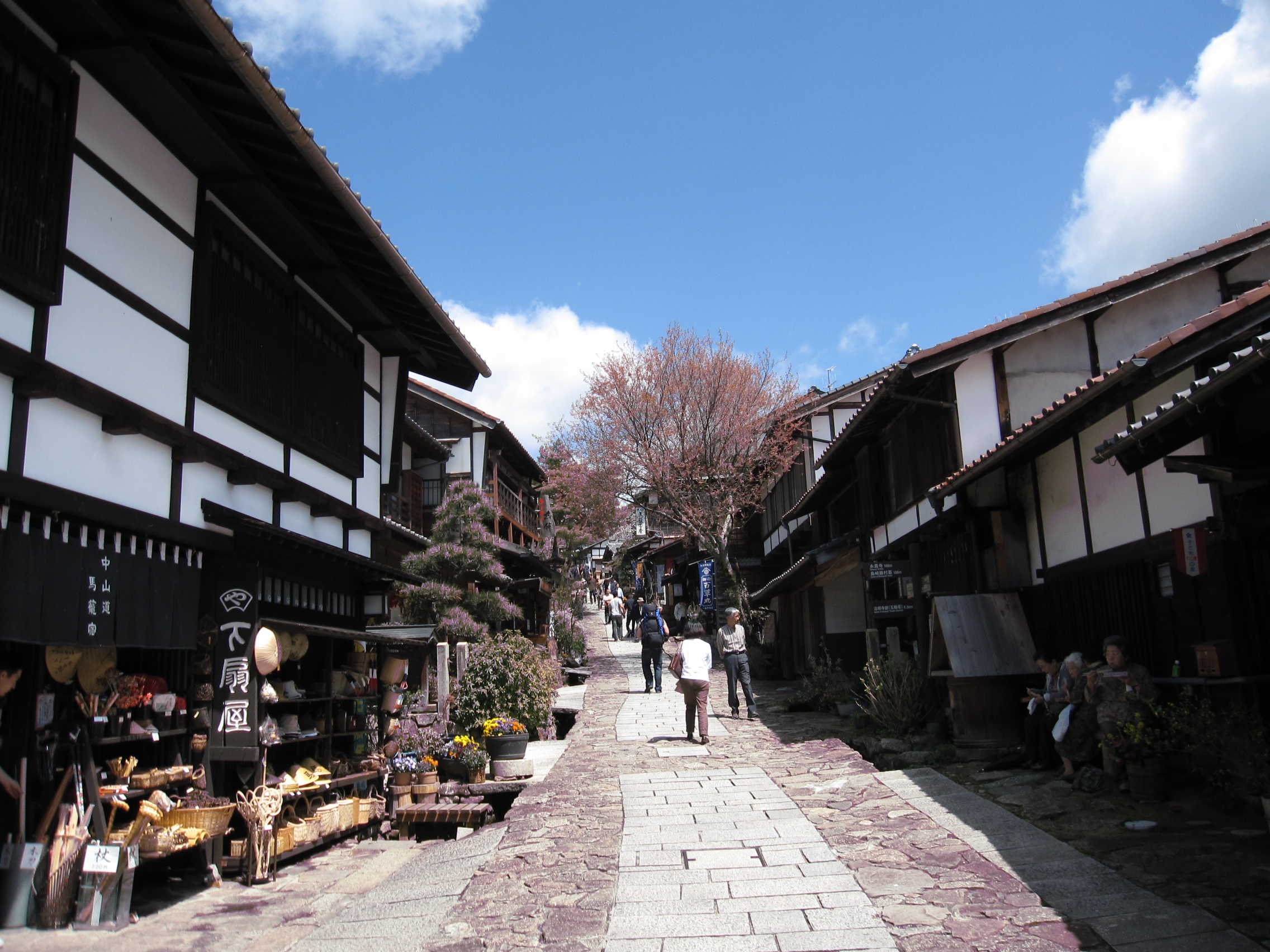
Nakasendō's Magome-juku

These stations were first established by Tokugawa Ieyasu shortly after the end of the Battle of Sekigahara. The first stations were developed along the Tōkaidō (followed by stations on the Nakasendō and other routes). In 1601, the first of the Tōkaidō's fifty-three stations were developed, stretching from Shinagawa-juku in Edo to Ōtsu-juku in Ōmi Province. Not all the post stations were built at the same time, however, as the last one was built in 1624.

The lodgings in the post stations were established for use by public officials and, when there were not enough lodgings, nearby towns were also put into use. The post station's toiyaba, honjin and sub-honjin were all saved for the public officials. It was hard to receive a profit as the proprietor of these places, but the shōgun provided help in the form of various permits, rice collection and simple money lending, making it possible for the establishments to stay open. The hatago, retail stores, tea houses, etc., which were designed for general travelers, were able to build a profit. Ai no shuku were intermediate post stations; though they were unofficial resting spots, they had many of the same facilities.

Generally speaking, as the Meiji period arrived and brought along the spread of rail transport, the number of travelers visiting these post stations greatly declined, as did the prosperity of the post stations.

== Post station facilities ==
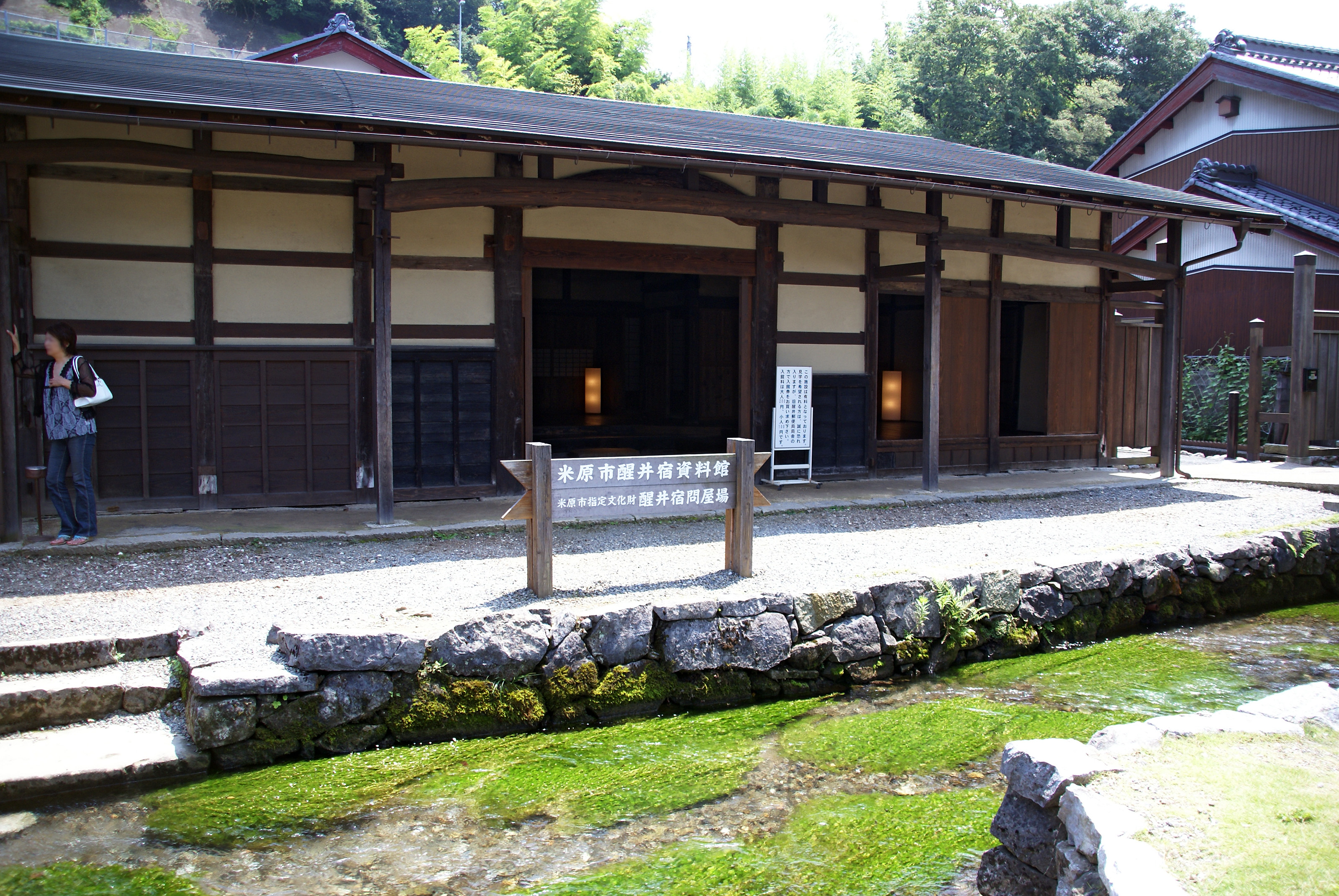
Samegai-juku's toiyaba

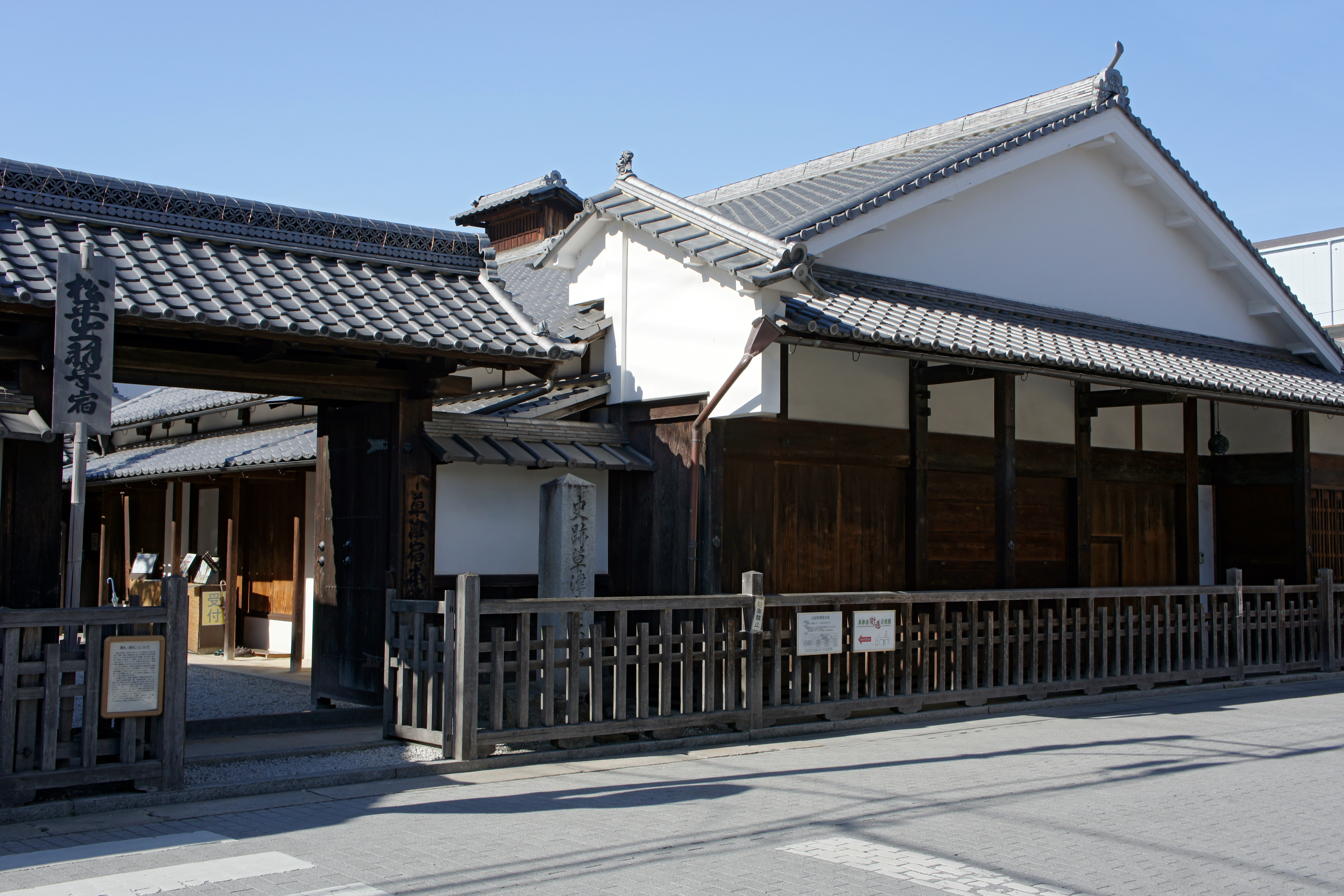
Kusatsu-juku's honjin

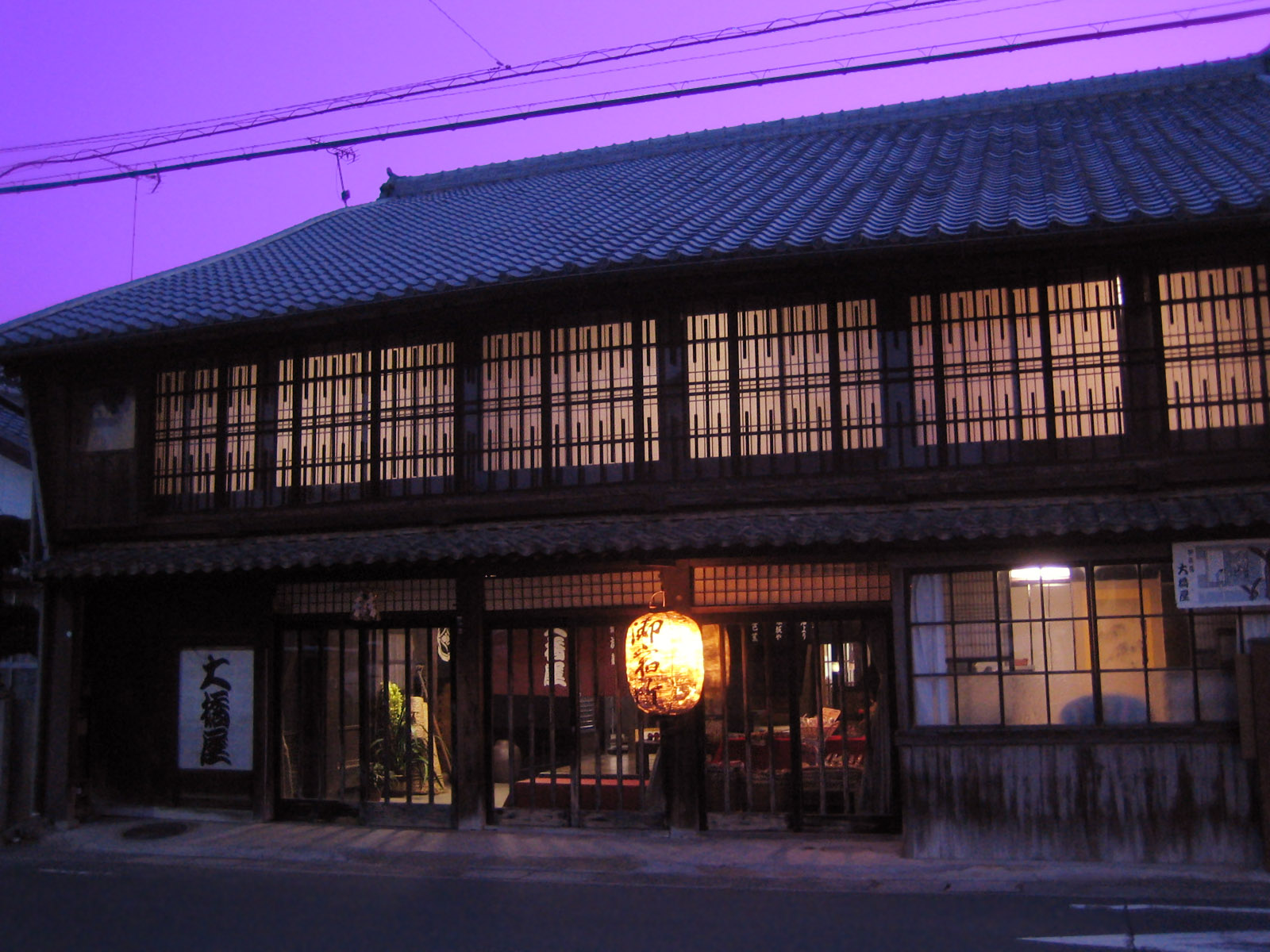
Akasaka-juku's hatago

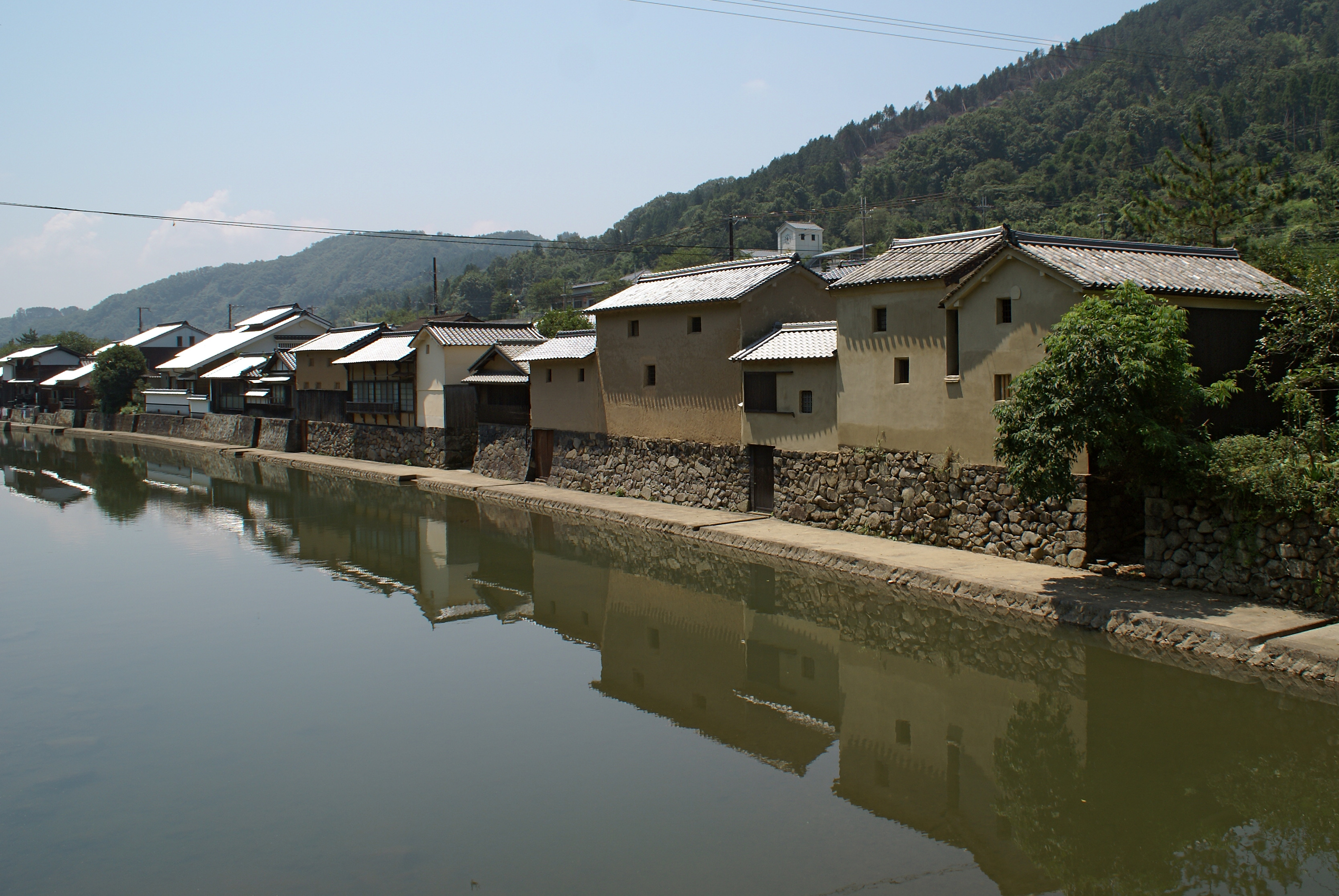
Hirafuku-shuku's Kawabata

- Ton'yaba (問屋場): General offices that helped manage the post town.
- Honjin (本陣): Rest areas and lodgings built for use by samurai and court nobles. Honjin were not businesses; instead, large residences in the post towns were often designated as lodging for government officials.
- Waki-honjin (脇本陣): These facilities were also for use by samurai and court nobles, but general travelers could also stay here if there were vacancies.
- Hatago (旅籠): Facilities that offered accommodations to general travelers and also served food.
- Kichin-yado (木賃宿): Facilities that offered accommodations to general travelers, but did not serve food.
- Chaya (茶屋): Rest areas that sold tea, food and alcohol to travelers.
- Shops: General shops built to sell wares to travelers.
- Kōsatsu (高札): Signboards on which the shōgun's proclamations were posted.

== Preserved and rebuilt post stations ==
- Nationally designated Architectural Preservation Sites
  - Aizu Nishi Kaidō's Ōuchi-juku (Shimogō, Minamiaizu District, Fukushima Prefecture)
  - Hokkoku Kaidō's Unno-juku (Tōmi, Nagano Prefecture)
  - Nakasendō's Narai-juku (Shiojiri, Nagano Prefecture)
  - Nakasendō's Tsumago-juku (Nagiso, Nagano Prefecture)
  - Tōkaidō's Seki-juku (Kameyama, Mie Prefecture)
  - Saba Kaidō's Kumagawa-shuku (Wakasa, Mikatakaminaka District, Fukui Prefecture)
- Inaba Kaidō's Hirafuku-shuku (Sayō, Sayō District, Hyōgo Prefecture)
- Inaba Kaidō's Ōhara-shuku (Mimasaka, Okayama Prefecture)
- Inaba Kaidō's Chizu-shuku (Chizu, Tottori, Yazu District, Tottori Prefecture)
- Nagasaki Kaidō's Koyanose-juku (Yahatanishi-ku, Kitakyūshū, Fukuoka Prefecture)
- Nagasaki Kaidō's Uchino-shuku (Iizuka, Fukuoka Prefecture)
- Nagasaki Kaidō's Shiota-shuku (Ureshino, Saga Prefecture)
- Tōkaidō's Ishibe-juku (Konan, Shiga Prefecture)

== Cultural heritage ==
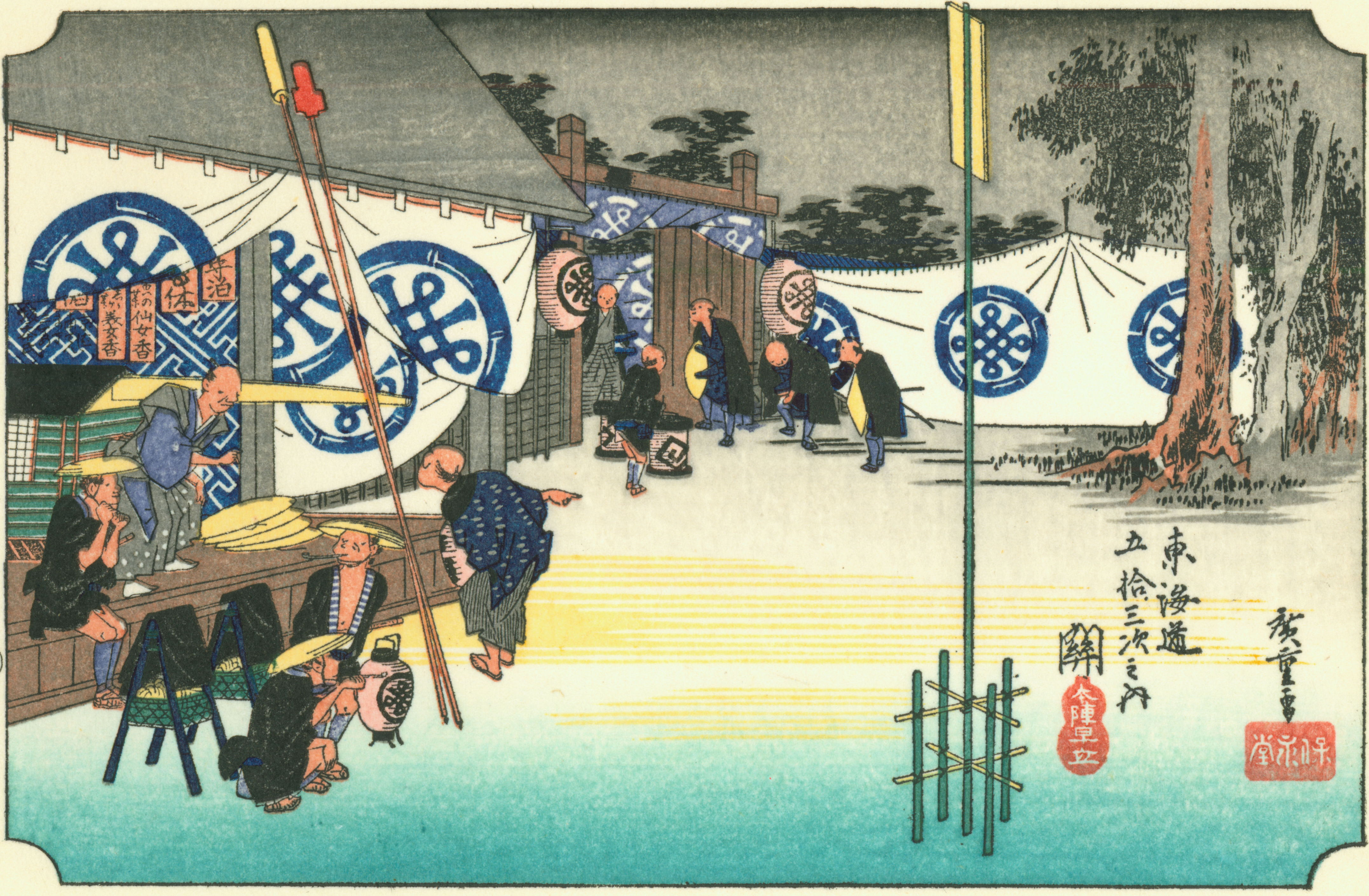
The 47th Station: Early departure from the inn at the shukuba of Seki

Many shukuba are preserved as cultural heritage. They are also often the subjects of Ukiyo-e, such as in The Fifty-three Stations of the Tōkaidō by Hiroshige.

== See also ==
- Ai no shuku, rest areas along historical routes in Japan
- Caravanserai, Middle Eastern equivalent of Shukuba
- Edo Five Routes, five major Edo period roads
- Hatago, lodgings for Shukuba travelers
- Honjin, resting area for pre-modern Japanese government officials
- Inn, Western European equivalent of Shukuba
- Kaidō, Edo period roads
- Ryokan, Japanese rest areas
