= Fushimi-juku (Tōkaidō) =

Fushimi-juku (伏見宿, Fushimi-juku) was the first station on the Ōsaka Kaidō (or fifty-fourth of the fifty-seven stations of the Tōkaidō). It is located in Fushimi-ku in the present-day city of Kyoto, Kyoto Prefecture, Japan.

== History ==
Fushimi-juku was founded in 1619. It was a successful post station because it also shared the area with the castle town surrounding Fushimi Castle, as well as Fushimi Port on the Yodo River.

== Neighboring Post Towns ==
Ōsaka Kaidō (extended Tōkaidō)
Ōtsu-juku – Fushimi-juku – Yodo-juku
