= Sanjō Ōhashi =

Bridge in Kyoto

Coordinates: 35°0′32.66″N 135°46′18.25″E

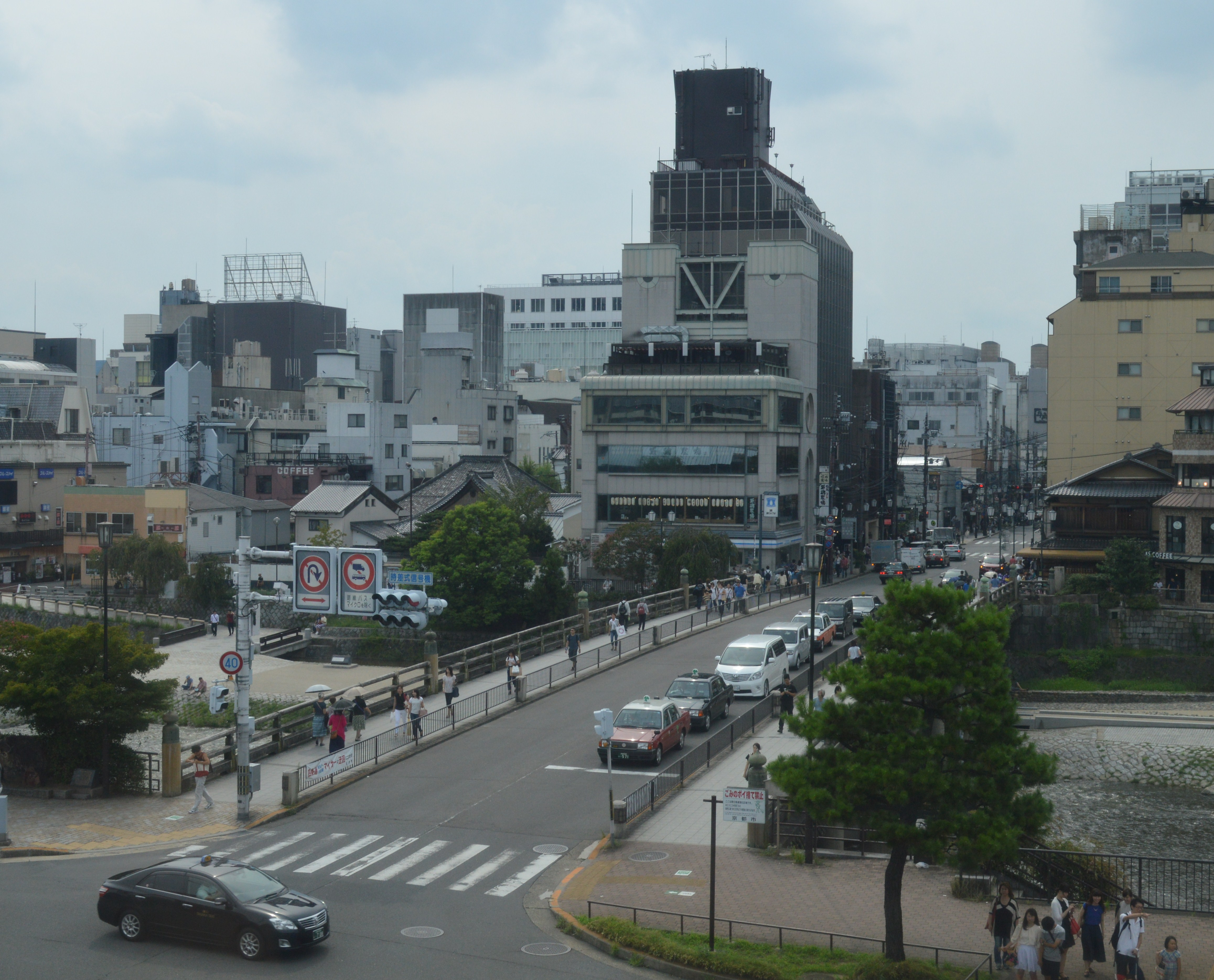
2015

Sanjō Ōhashi (三条大橋) is a bridge in Kyoto, Kyoto Prefecture, Japan. It spans the Kamo River as part of Sanjō-dōri (三条通り Third Avenue). It is well known because it served as the ending location for journeying on both the Nakasendō and the Tōkaidō; these were two of the famous "Five Routes" for long-distance travelers during the Edo period in Japan's past.

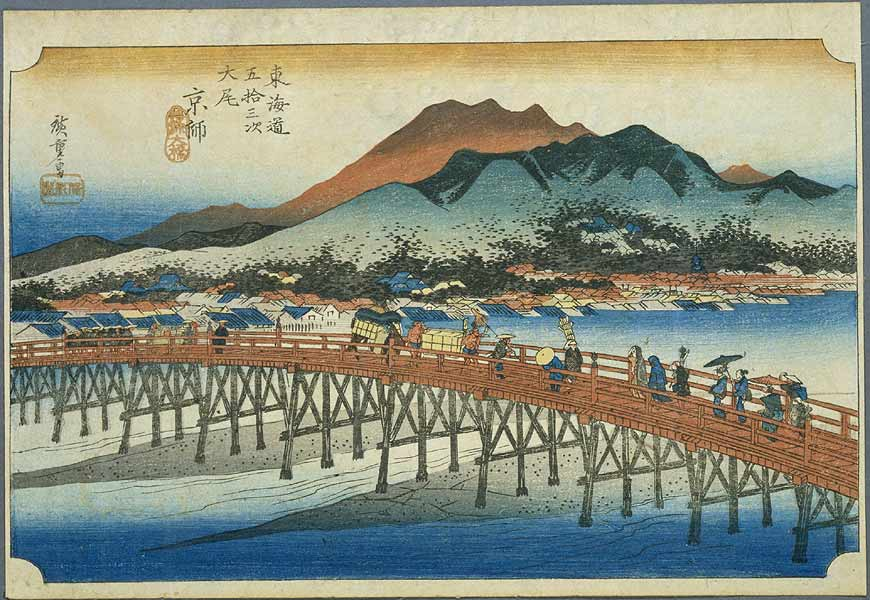
Sanjō Ōhashi in the 1830s, as depicted by Hiroshige in The Fifty-three Stations of the Tōkaidō

== History ==
It is unclear when this bridge was first built, but there are records of Toyotomi Hideyoshi ordering its repair in 1590, as well as one of the original giboshi (擬宝珠) (onion-shaped posts that are located on bridges, shrines and temples in Japan). A historical marker on the southwest side draws attention to a cut on one of the giboshi, speculating that it was made by a sword during the Ikedaya incident (the inn was located close by).

The current concrete bridge, which includes two lanes for driving and a walking path on either side, was built in 1950.

== Neighboring post towns ==
Nakasendō & Tōkaidō
Ōtsu-juku - Sanjō Ōhashi (ending location)
