= Kago =

Japanese human transportation tool

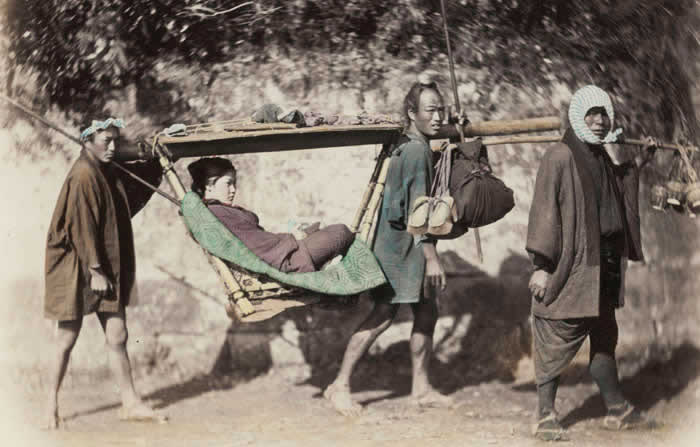
Group portrait of a woman in a kago, two bearers and a man using a carrying pole. Felice Beato, between 1863 and 1877

A kago (駕籠) is a type of litter used as a means of human transportation by the non-samurai class in feudal Japan and into the Meiji period (1868–1911).

== Description and use ==
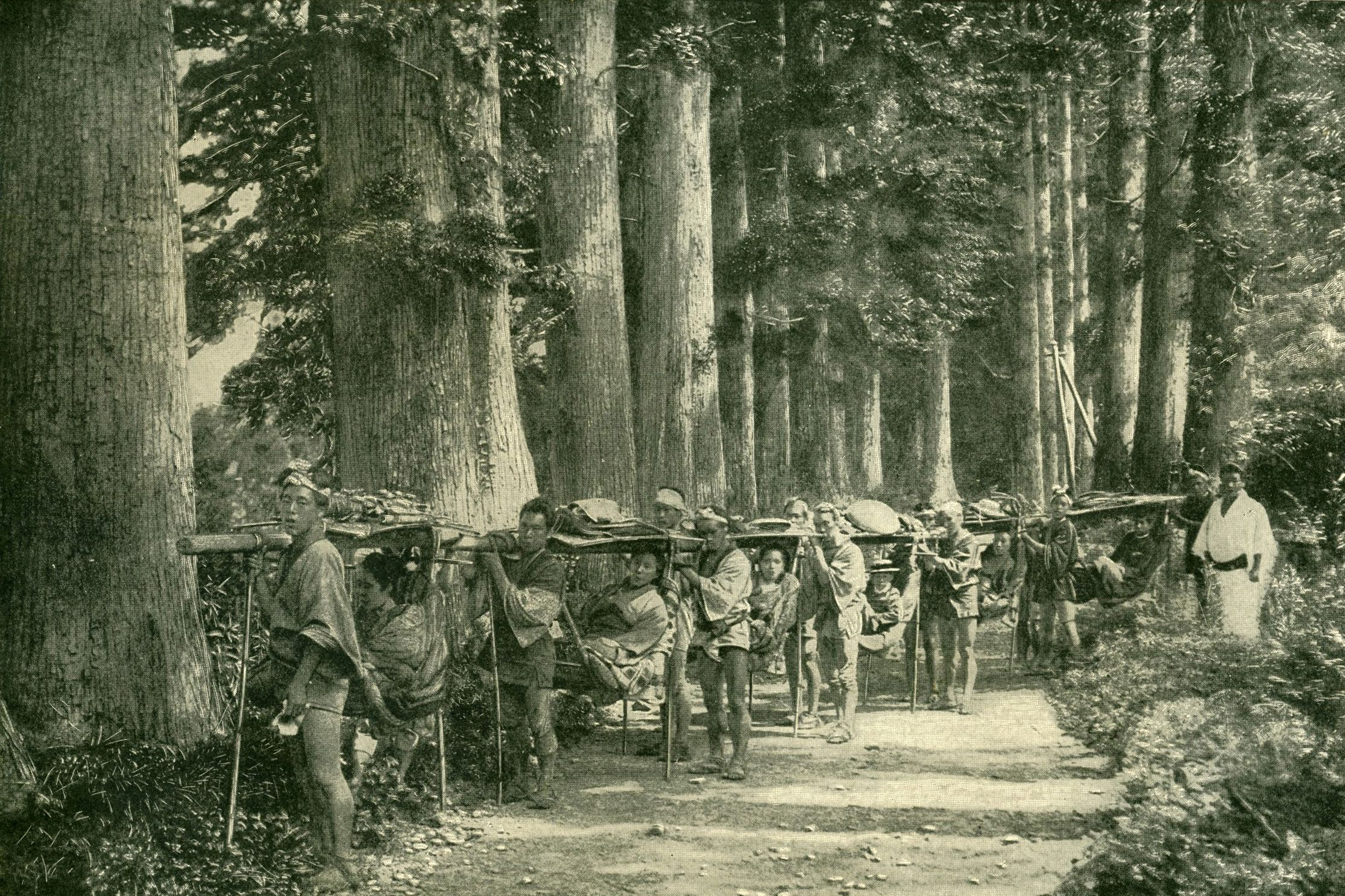
Kago in use on the Tōkaidō. Kusakabe Kimbei

The basket of a kago was roughly 3 ft (0.91 m) long, and attached to bamboo uprights which were suspended by a large overhead single crossbeam. A roof of some type covered the top and screens could be used to cover the sides as protection from sun or rain. A kago would be carried by a team of four men, who would take turns carrying the kago on their shoulders; five or six miles could be traveled in one hour. One man would support the weight of the large overhead pole at each end and walked until he tired and switched with a rested carrier. The kago should not be confused with the more elaborate norimono, which were used by the samurai class and wealthy individuals.
