= Tōkaidō (road) =

Route from Japan's Edo Period

- (東海道; East Sea Road)
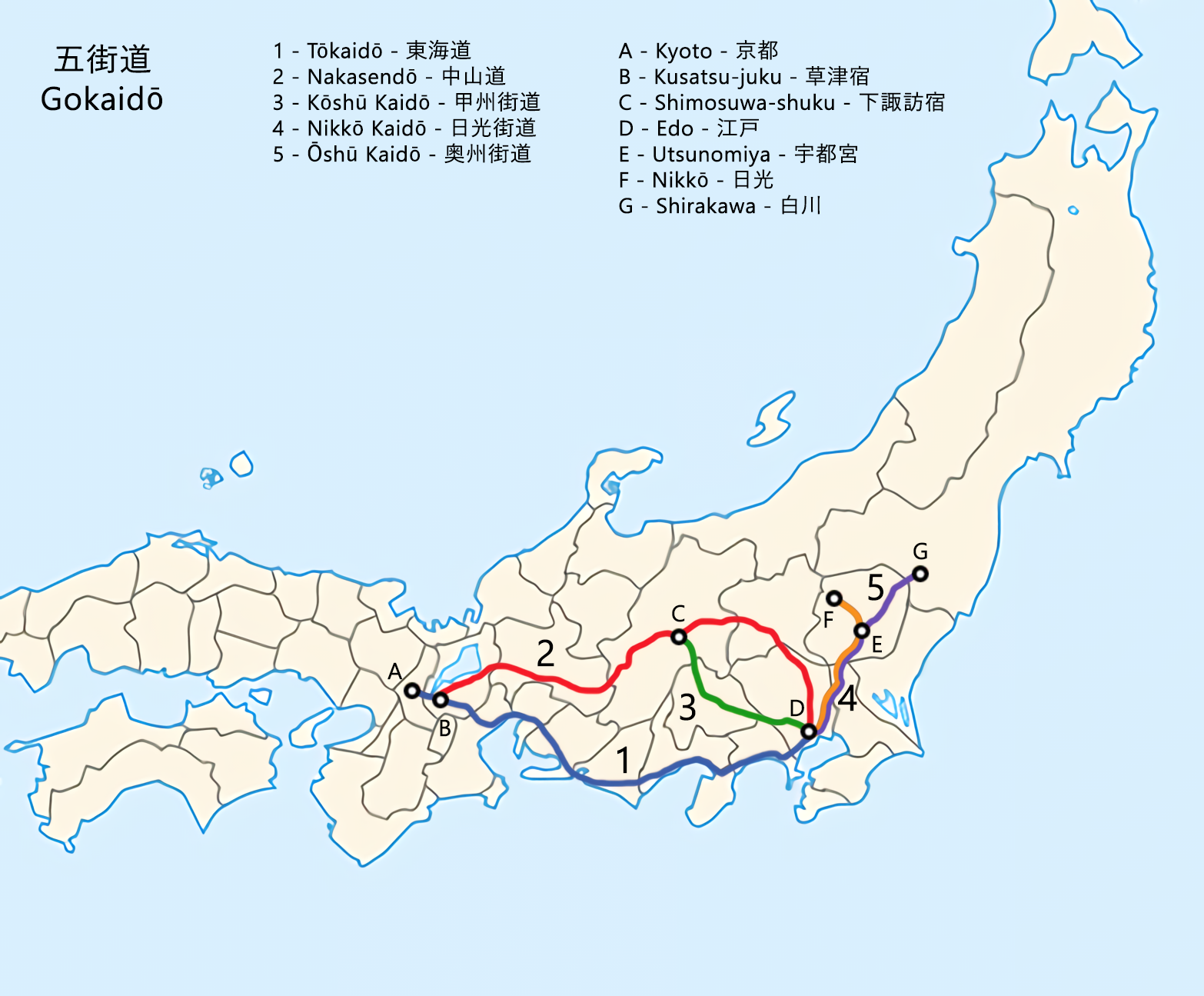
- The Five Routes, the Tōkaidō being the southernmost route

Route information
- Established by Tokugawa shogunate
- Length: 514 km (319 mi)
- Time period: Edo
- Cultural significance: Most important road connecting Japan's two largest cities
- Related routes: The Five Routes
- Restrictions: Permit required to travel beyond each check station

Major junctions
- West end: Sanjō Ōhashi in Kyoto, Japan
- Ōsaka Kaidō at Ōtsu-juku station, Japan; Nakasendō at Kusatsu-juku station, Japan
- East end: Edobashi in Edo

Location
- Country: Japan

Highway system
- National highways of Japan; Expressways of Japan

The Tōkaidō road (東海道, Tōkaidō; [to̞ːka̠ido̞ː]), which roughly means "eastern sea route," was the most important of the Five Routes of the Edo period in Japan, connecting Kyoto to the de facto capital of Japan at Edo (modern-day Tokyo). Unlike the inland and less heavily travelled Nakasendō, the Tōkaidō travelled along the sea coast of eastern Honshū, hence the route's name.

The Tōkaidō was first used in ancient times as a route from Kyoto to Hitachi Province (central Honshu) before the Edo period.

== Traveling the Tōkaidō ==
Most of the travel was on foot, as wheeled carts were almost nonexistent, and heavy cargo was usually sent by boat. Members of the higher class, however, traveled by kago. Women were forbidden from travelling alone and had to be accompanied by men. Other restrictions were also put in place for travelers, but, while severe penalties existed for various travel regulations, most seem not to have been enforced. Captain Sherard Osborn, who traveled part of the road in around 1858, noted that:

The social status of a person is indicated by the manner in which he travels. The daimyo and people of the upper-class travel in norimono, which are roomy enough to allow for a fair amount of ease, and are comfortably furnished. The sides can be opened or closed at will, as a protection against the weather. The length of the pole proclaims the rank of the passenger; if a nobleman, a long pole borne by five or six men at each end; a person of lower rank, a shorter pole and only four carriers. If the occupant is a prince of the royal family, the pole rests on the palms of the hands, otherwise it is borne on the shoulders. Humble individuals have to be satisfied with a kago carried by two porters, which entails a very cramped position. In steep mountain regions everyone, whatever their rank, is obliged to use a kago.

The lords of the various manors are compelled by the authorities to maintain these places of refreshment for travelers; they are vastly superior to the caravanserais of the East, and relays of horses or porters are always ready at these post-houses, and must do all work at a regular fixed charge, ridiculously small according to English notions. Another and still more onerous duty falls on these establishments, and that is the responsibility of forwarding all Imperial dispatches between the two capitals, or from Yedo to any part of the Empire. Runners are consequently ever ready to execute this task.

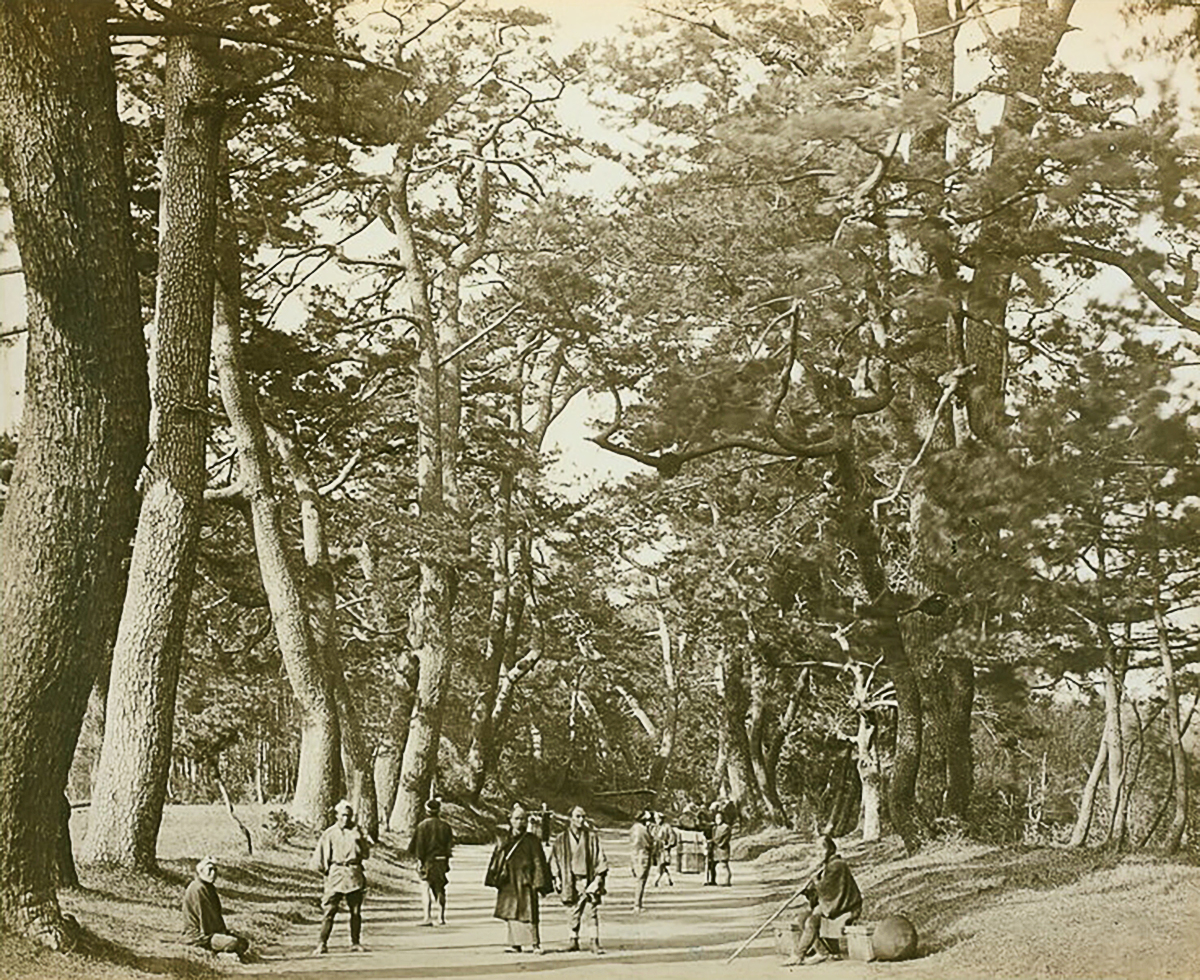
Tōkaidō, photographed by Felice Beato in 1865.

Along the Tōkaidō, there were government-sanctioned post stations (shukuba) for travelers' rest. These stations consisted of porter stations and horse stables, as well as lodging, food and other places a traveler may visit. The original Tōkaidō was made up of 53 stations between the termination points of Edo and Kyoto. The 53 stations were taken from the 53 Buddhist saints that Buddhist acolyte Sudhana visited to receive teachings in his quest for enlightenment. The route passed through several provinces, each administered by a daimyō, the borders of whose regions were clearly delineated. At numerous checkpoints set up by the government, travelers had to present traveling permits in order to pass onward.

There were almost no bridges over the larger, fast-flowing rivers, forcing travelers to be ferried across by boat or be carried by watermen porters. Additionally, at one point in Nagoya the road was barred by several rivers and voyagers had to take a boat across the sea for 17 miles (27 km) to reach Kuwana station. These water crossings were a potential source of delay: In ideal weather, the entire Tōkaidō journey on foot could be made in about a week, but if conditions were bad a trip might take up to a month.

In 1613, William Adams and John Saris accompanied by ten other Englishmen, were some of the first Westerners to travel on the road. Saris found the quality of the road remarkable, and contrasted it with the poor state of roads back home; the sand and gravel surface was "wonderful even" and "where it meeteth with mountains, the passage is cut through". At roadside lodgings, the group feasted upon rice and fish, with "pickled herbs, beans, radishes, and other roots" and an abundance "of cheese", which in reality was tofu. Although their passage was safe, Saris was disturbed by the crucified remains of criminals which lined the road at the approach of each town. At Shizuoka, they saw severed human heads upon a scaffold and many crucifixes "with the dead corpses of those which had been executed remaining still upon them". Remains littered the road and caused them "a most unsavory passage".

== The Tōkaidō in art and literature ==
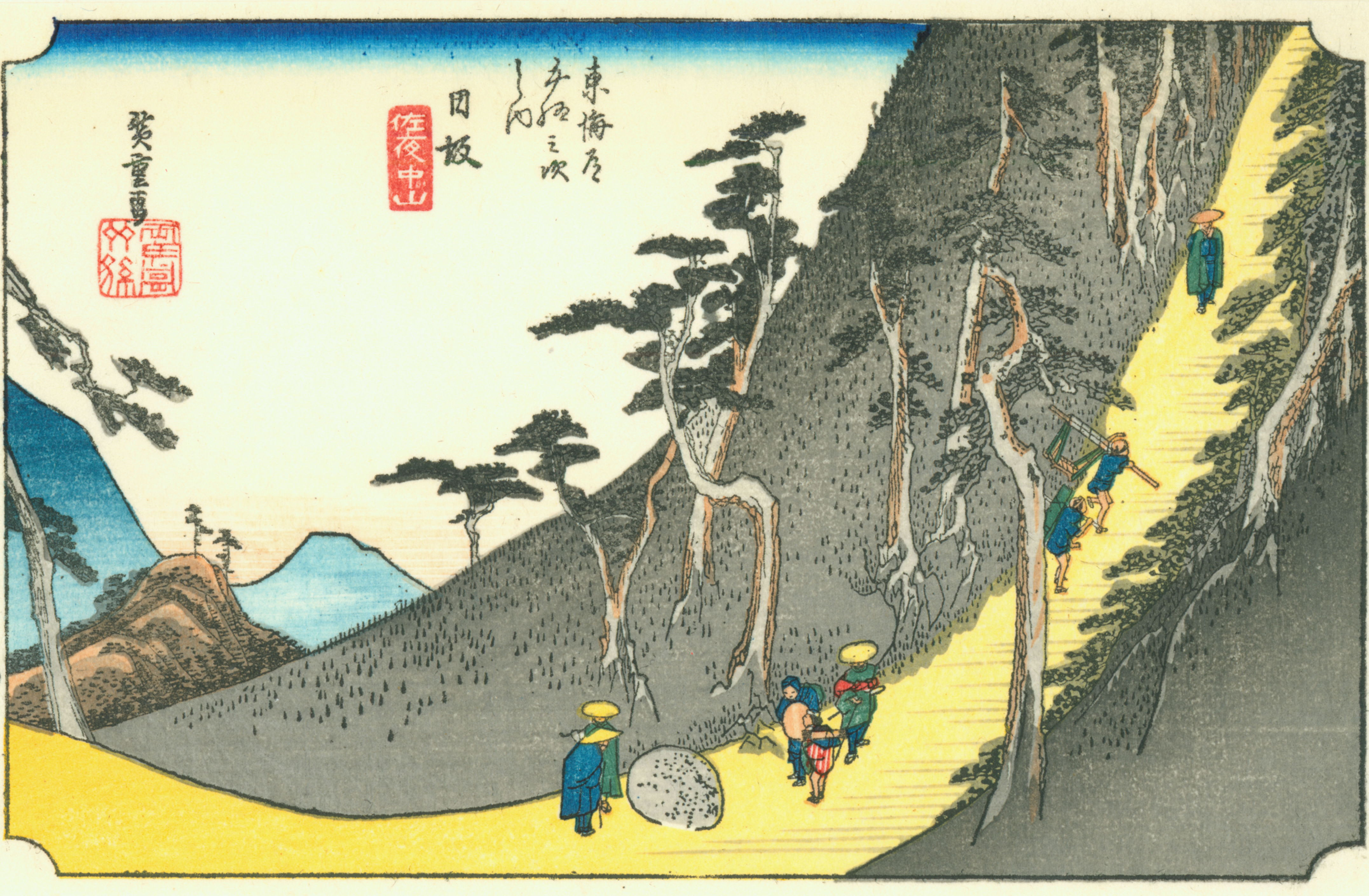
Nissaka-shuku, the 25th station on the Tōkaidō, as illustrated by the ukiyo-e master Hiroshige. This print is from the first (Hoeiko) edition of The Fifty-three Stations of the Tōkaidō.

Travel, particularly along the Tōkaidō, was a very popular topic in art and literature at the time. A great many guidebooks of famous places were published and distributed at this time, and a culture of virtual tourism through books and pictures thrived. Jippensha Ikku's Tōkaidōchū Hizakurige, translated as "The Shank's Mare", is one of the more famous novels about a journey along the Tōkaidō.

The artist Hiroshige depicted each of the 53 Stations of the Tōkaidō (shukuba) in his work The Fifty-three Stations of the Tōkaidō, and the haiku poet Matsuo Bashō travelled along the road. The Tōkaidō gojūsan tsui (Fifty-Three Pairings along the Tōkaidō Road), created in 1845, is one of the most well-known and fascinating examples of woodblock prints inspired by the road. Japan's three leading print designers of the nineteenth century—Kuniyoshi, Hiroshige, and Kunisada—paired each Tōkaidō rest station with an intriguing, cryptic design.

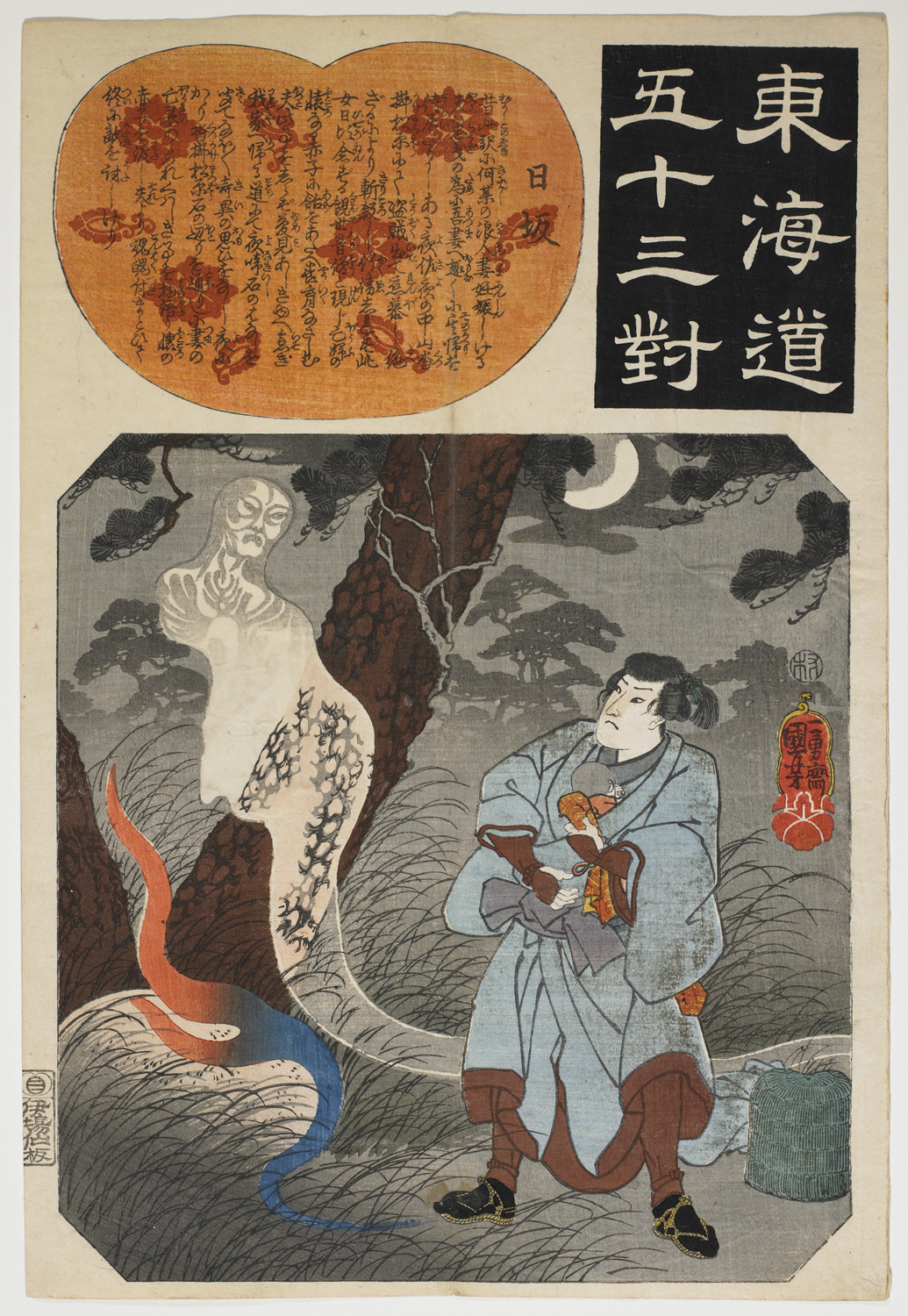
Nissaka Station, Utagawa Kuniyoshi, Tōkaidō gojūsan tsui . Collection Samuel P. Harn Museum of Art (2005.25.7.26) Samuel P. Harn Museum of Art

Due to the harsh and punitive Tenpō-era reforms which attempted to impose a strictly defined morality, prints of celebrity actors, courtesans, and entertainers were outlawed during this time. Crafted to outwit the artistic restrictions imposed by the reforms, the woodcuts in the Parallel Series became popular visual puzzles that were frequently reproduced. Because of the ingenious approach to the Tōkaidō theme, the Tōkaidō gojūsan tsui has been praised as one of the most innovative and important works from the late Edo period. Its three designers followed their individual interests and strengths, and yet shared a common composition—dominant figures against distant landscapes. They used a variety of motifs, including stories from kabuki theater, poetry, famous tales, legends, landmarks, and local specialties.

In the early 1980s, inspired by Hiroshige, American artist Bill Zacha travelled the Tokaido stations. He created a series of 55 serigraphs, each depicting one stop along the Tokaido way, and printed 100 copies of each design. These were collected in the 1985 book Tokaido Journey, along with Zacha's recollections (in both English and Japanese) of travelling the road and the people he encountered.

The British painter Nigel Caple travelled along the Tōkaidō Road between 1998 and 2000, making drawings of the 53 stations along the Tōkaidō. His inspiration was the Hoeido Edition of woodblock prints entitled The Fifty-three Stations of the Tōkaidō by Utagawa Hiroshige.

The video game Firework Thrower Kantaro's 53 Stations of the Tokaido, released by Sunsoft for the Famicom in July 1986 and later ported to other Nintendo platforms, features a firework maker protagonist who must travel the Tōkaidō to visit his fiancée, while thwarting attacks from a rival businessman.

In 2012, a board game called Tokaido, designed by Antoine Bauza, was published by Funforge. In the game, players compete against one another to travel the Tōkaidō from Kyoto to Edo. Funforge developed a digital edition of the game, published in 2017.

== Ōsaka Kaidō ==
In 1619, the Ōsaka Kaidō (大阪街道) was established as a spur of the Tōkaidō; it had four stations of its own after Ōtsu-juku. This addition extended the route to Kōraibashi in Osaka. This spur was also called the Kyōkaidō (京街道), or it was described as being a part of the 57 stations of the Tōkaidō.

== Modern-day Tōkaidō ==
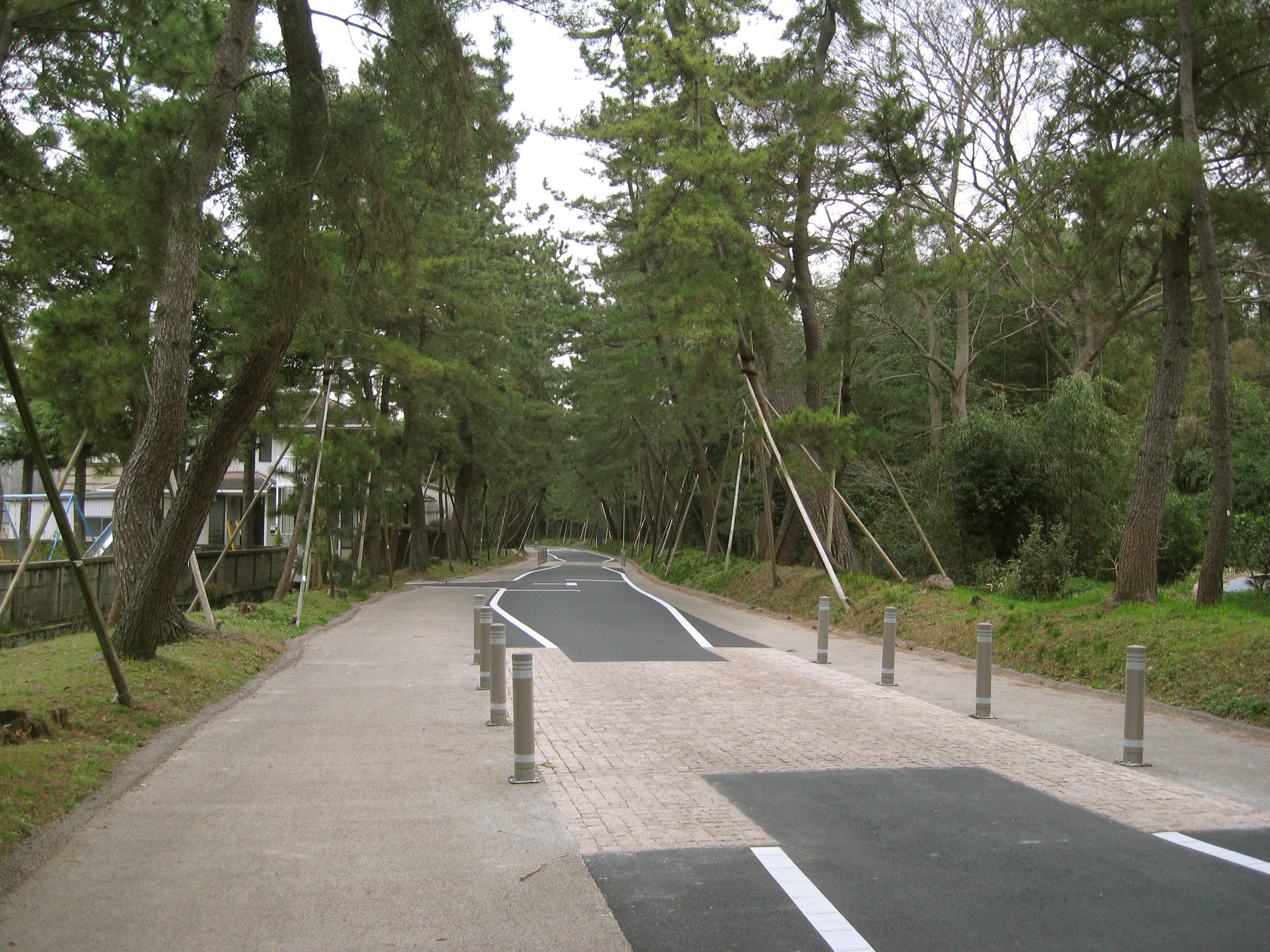
Goyu Pine Tree Avenue with sidewalk.(w:ja:御油の松並木)

Today, the Tōkaidō corridor is the most heavily travelled transportation corridor in Japan, connecting Greater Tokyo (including the capital Tokyo as well as Japan's second largest city Yokohama) to Nagoya (fourth largest), and then to Osaka (third largest) via Kyoto. The Tokyo-Nagoya-Kyoto-Osaka route is followed by the JR Tōkaidō Main Line and Tōkaidō Shinkansen, as well as the Tōmei and Meishin expressways. A few portions of the original road can still be found, however, and in modern times at least one person has managed to follow and walk much of it.

== See also ==
- 53 Stations of the Tōkaidō
- Edo Five Routes
- Japan National Route 1
- Namamugi Incident
- Tōkaidō Main Line
- Tōkaidō Shinkansen
- Stone routes near Kyoto
