= Harajuku (disambiguation) =

Harajuku (原宿) usually refers to the Harajuku district in Tokyo, Japan. It may also refer to:

- Harajuku Station
- Hara-juku (Tōkaidō), the thirteenth post station on the Tōkaidō
- Harajuku (dance project)
- Japanese street fashion, also known by the term harajuku
- "Harajuku", a song by Xaviersobased from Xavier, 2026
