= Arai Barrier =

Arai Sekisho 新居関所
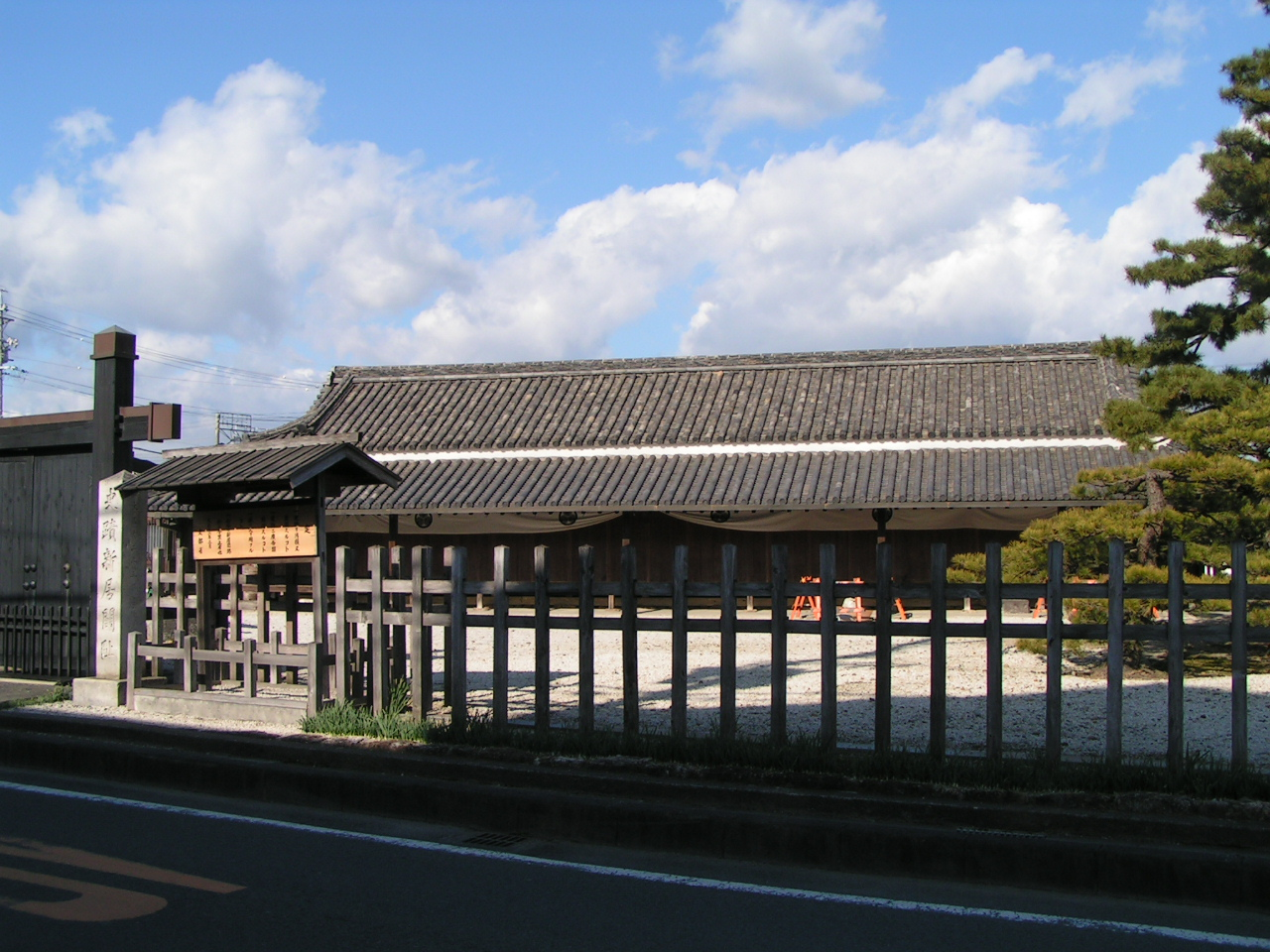
- Arai Barrier

- Location within Shizuoka Prefecture Location within Japan

General information
- Location: 1227-5 Arai, Arai-machi, Kosai, Shizuoka, Japan
- Coordinates: 34°41′40.78″N 137°33′40.73″E

Website
- Homepage (in Japanese)

The Arai Barrier (新居関所, Arai Sekisho) was a security checkpoint which was established by the Tokugawa Shogunate on the Tōkaidō highway connecting the capital of Edo with Kyoto in Edo period Japan. Its official name was the Imagire Barier (今切関所; Imagire-sekisho). In 1921, the site was recognized as a National Historic Site, and in recognition that it had only surviving Edo-period checkpoint structure remaining in the country, its status was upgraded to that of a Special National Historic Site in 1962.

== Overview ==
Located between Maisaka-juku and Arai-juku, in what is now the city of Kosai, Shizuoka Prefecture, the Arai Barrier was strategically positioned on the narrow strip of land between Lake Hamana and the Pacific Ocean, and was the only checkpoint on the Tōkaidō intended for travelers both by land and by water. All travelers were required to submit to an examination of their travel permits, and taxes were levied on commercial travelers with merchandise. The checkpoint was initially managed by the Arai Bugyō (新居奉行), a hatamoto post with a revenue of 1000 koku, who was assisted by six yoriki and 20 dōshin. From 1696, the post was to be held by two men who served in alternate years; however, the position was abolished in 1702 and the Arai Barrier was thereafter managed by Yoshida Domain on behalf of the shogunate.

The initial checkpoint, built in the year 1600, was destroyed by a tsunami during the Genroku period (1688-1703) and rebuilt only to be destroyed again during the 1707 Hōei earthquake. It was then moved to its current location on the western shore of Lake Hamana. The structures were rebuilt again after the 1854 Ansei-Tōkai earthquake.

The main building is a single-story structure facing south, with Irimoya gambrel sides and a tiled roof. It is long from east to west, and is divided into several rooms within.

Following the Meiji Restoration, the barrier was abolished in 1869, and its buildings were converted for use as an elementary school, followed by government offices until 1951.

The main building was restored in 1971, and additional buildings, such as gates and a pier, were re-created in 1998 on their original foundations as part of a museum.

== Gallery ==
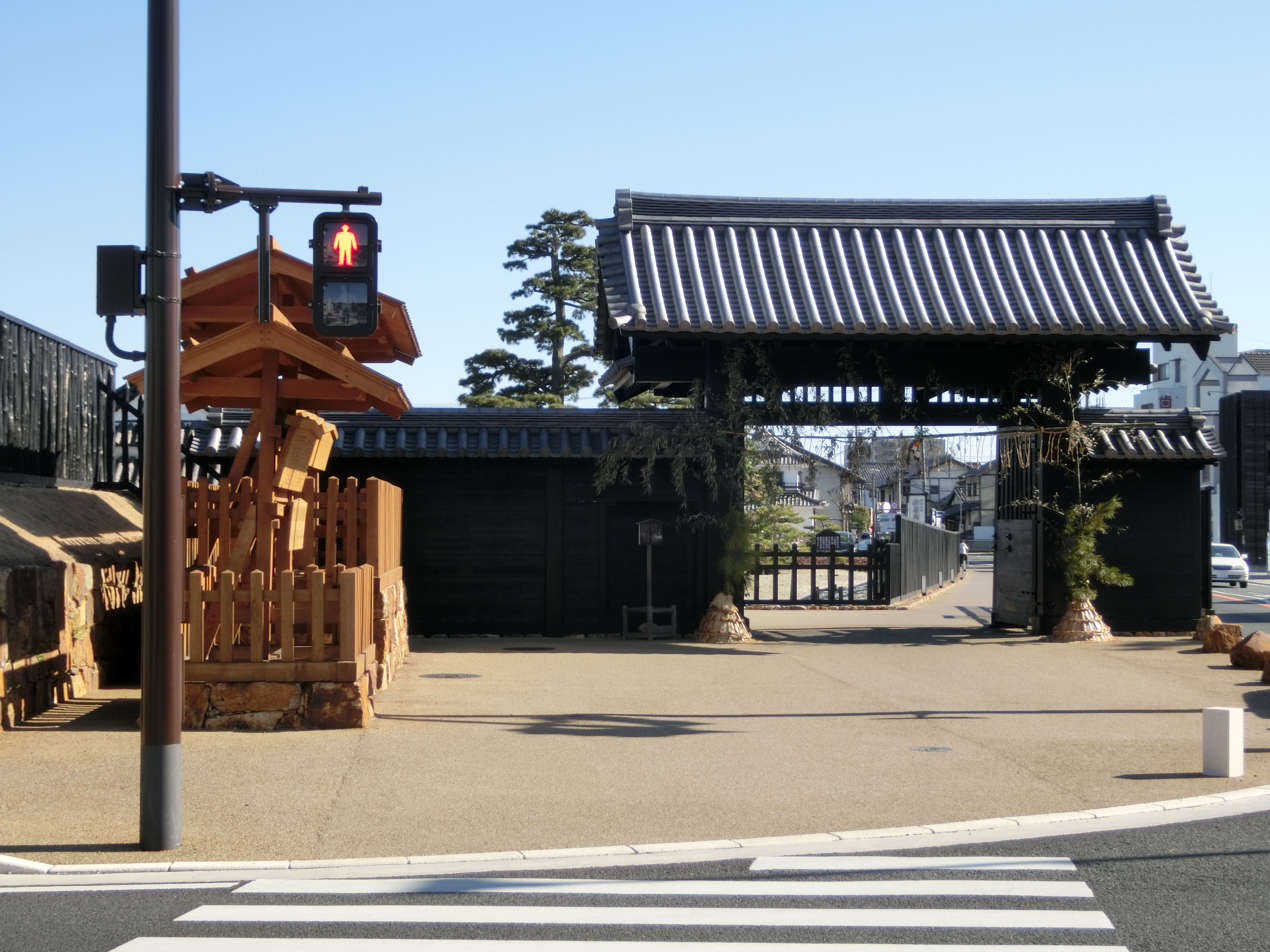
Entrance to Arai Barrier

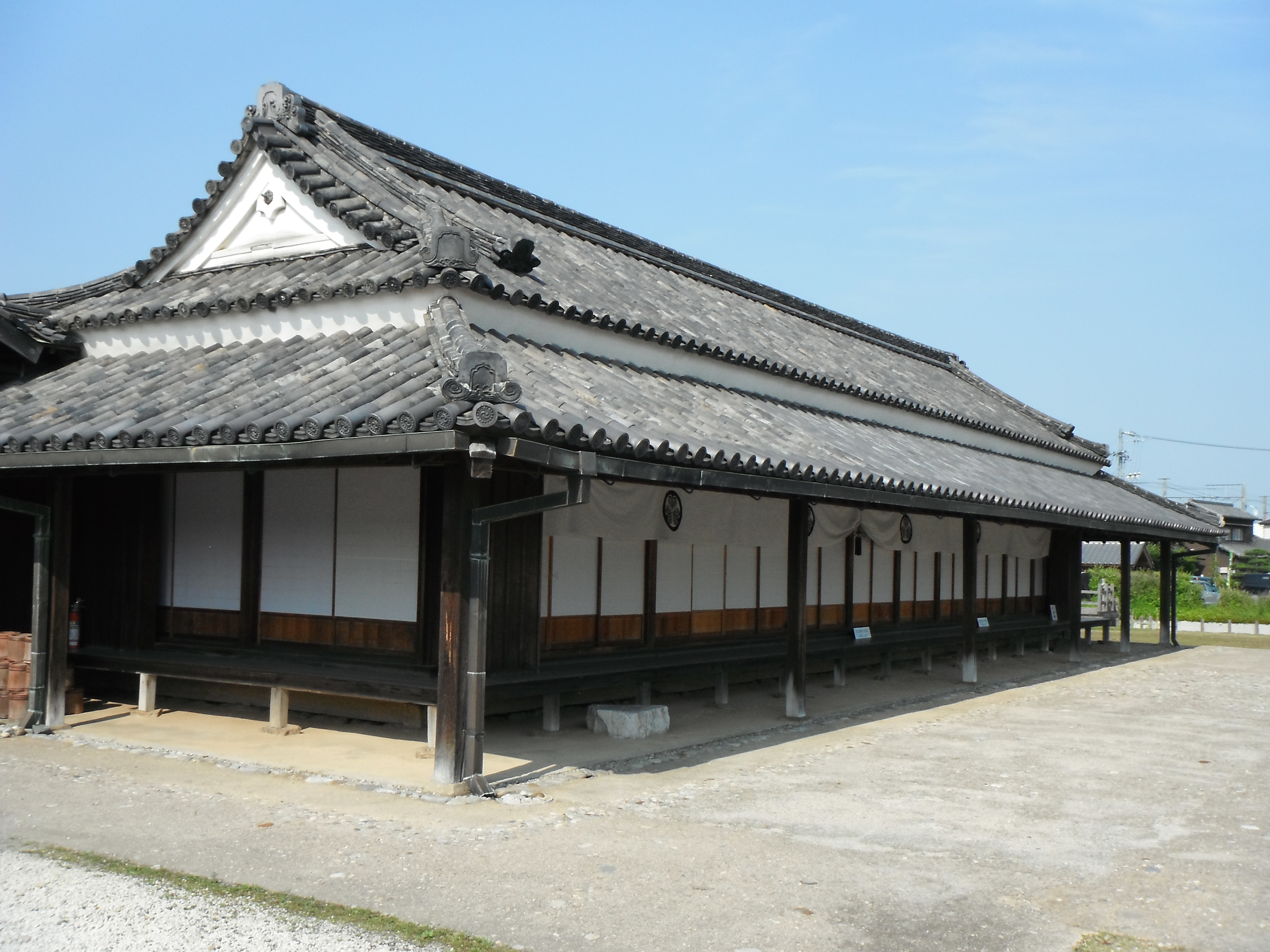
Arai Barrier

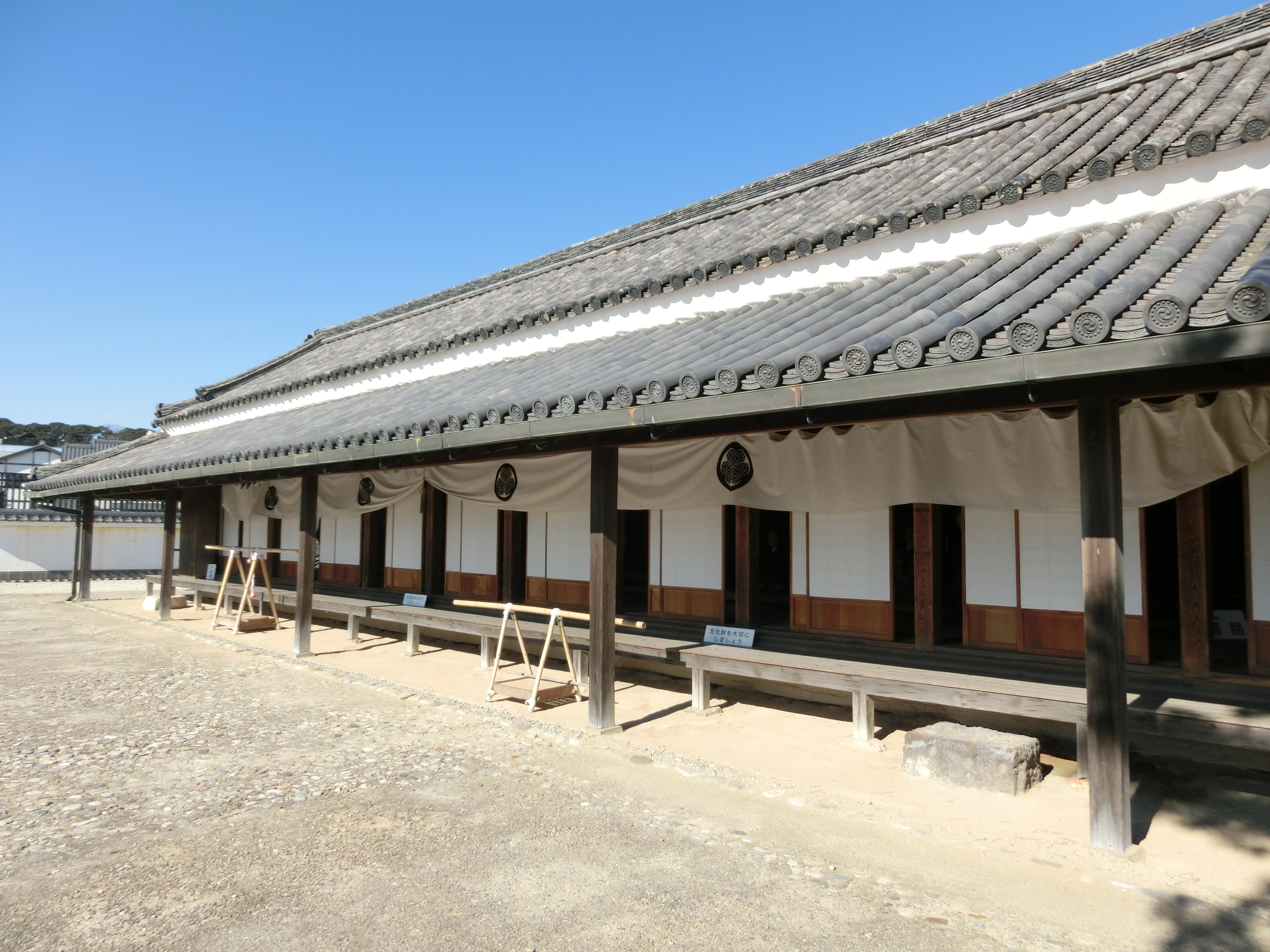
Arai Barrier

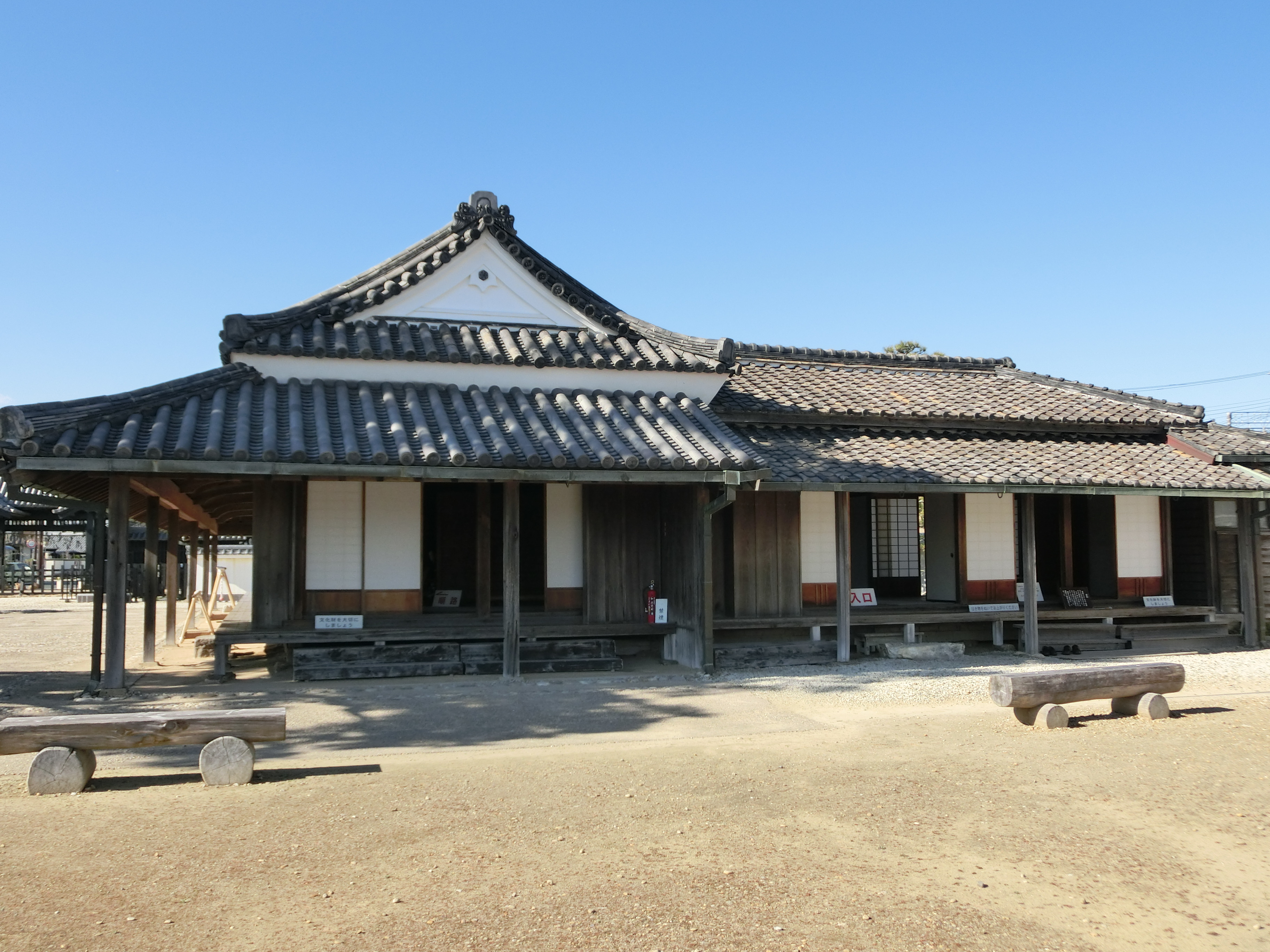
Arai Barrier

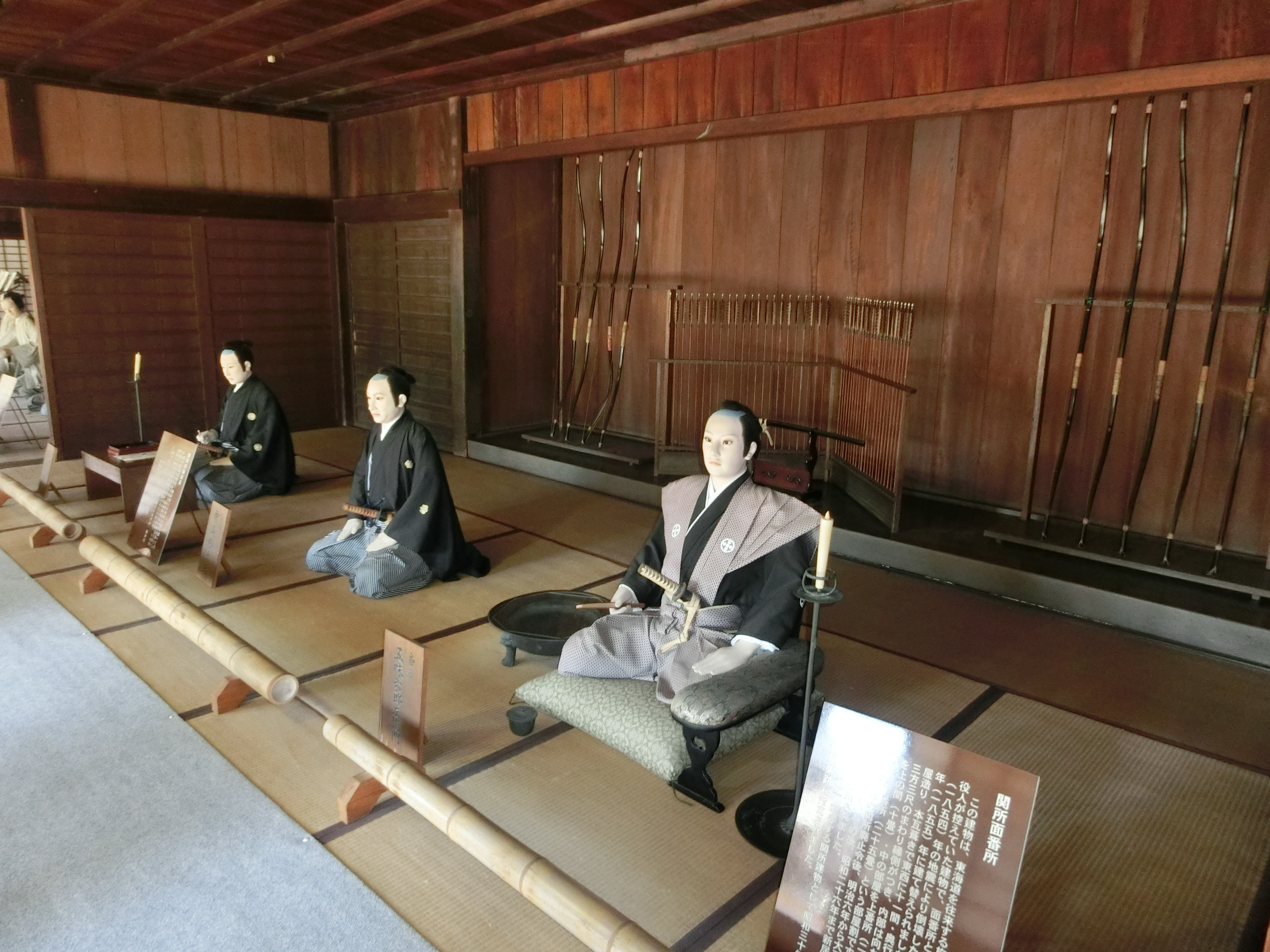
Arai Barrier interior

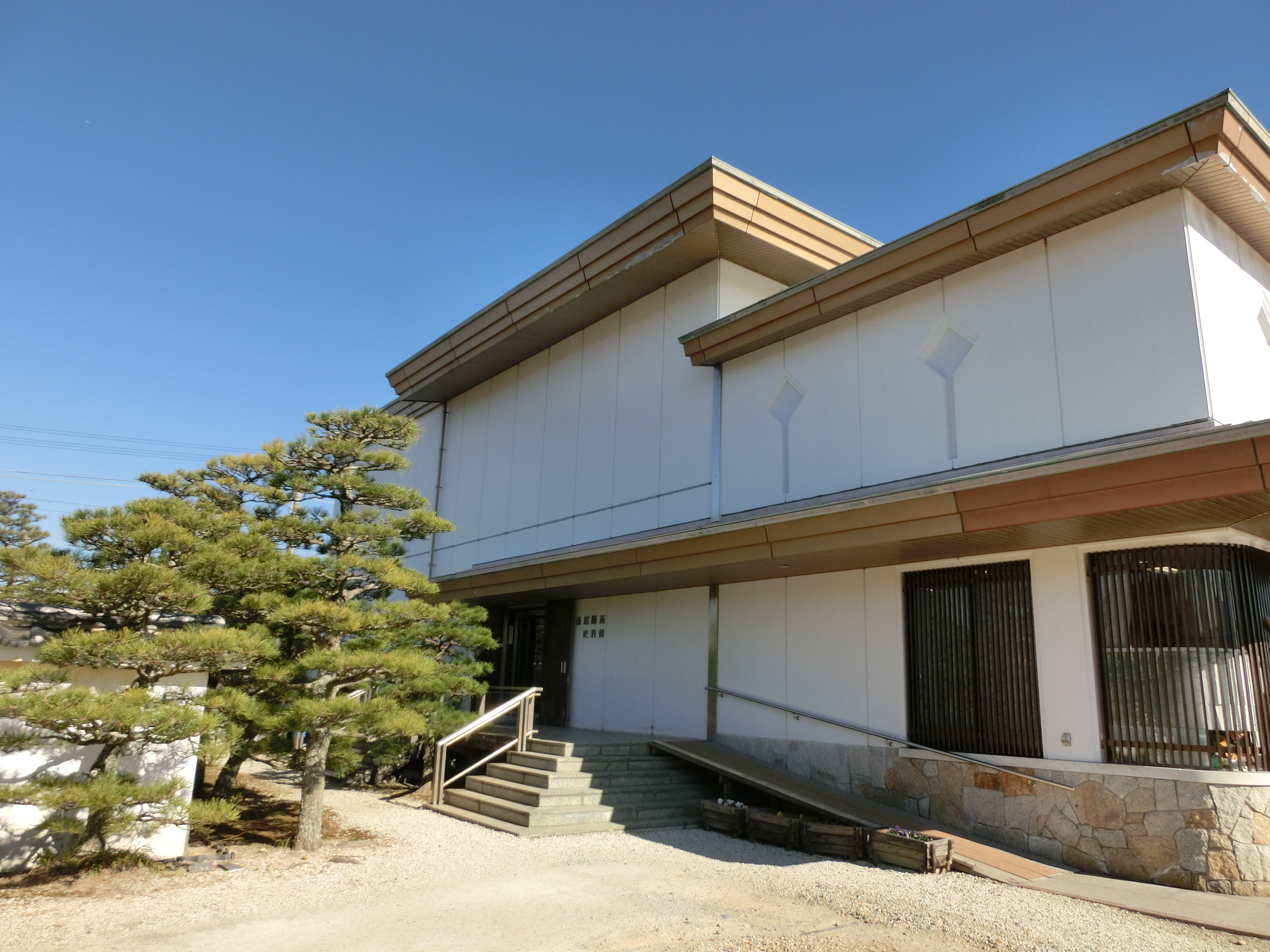
Arai Barrier Museum

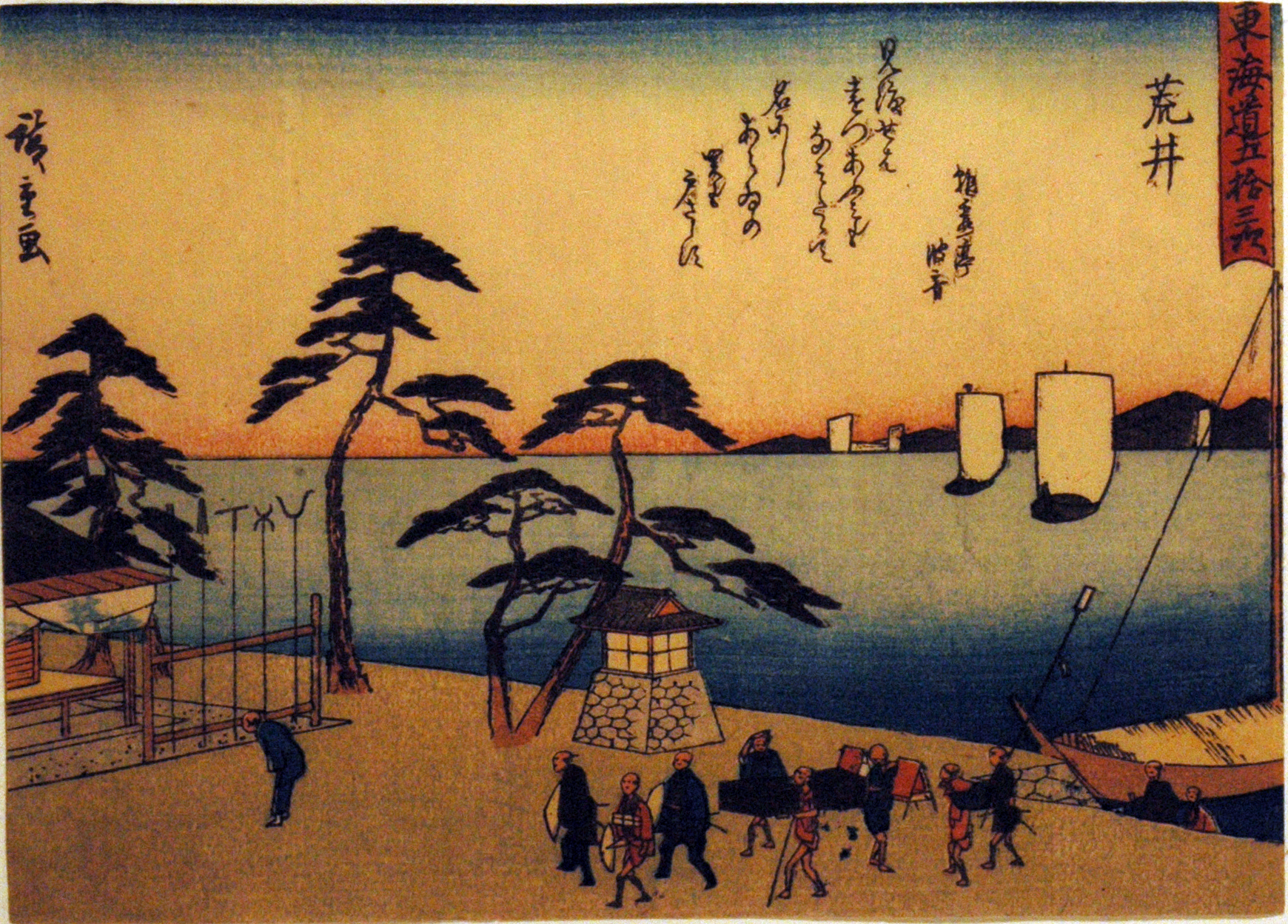
Travellers approaching Arai in Hiroshige's ukiyoe print of The Fifty-three Stations of the Tōkaidō

== See also ==
- List of Historic Sites of Japan (Shizuoka)
