= Mitsuke-juku =

Twenty-eighth of the 53 stations of the Tōkaidō in Japan

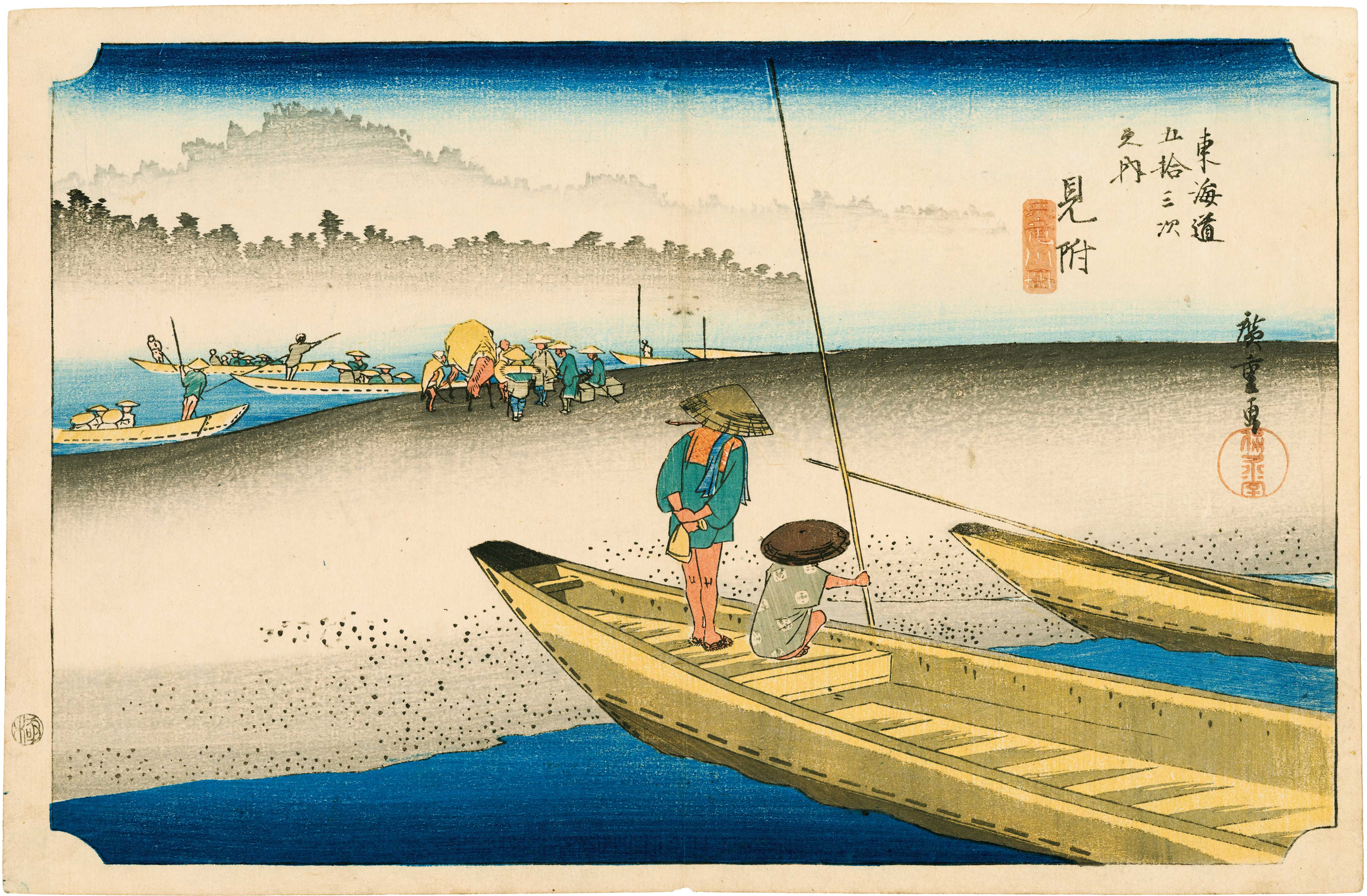
Mitsuke-juku in the 1830s, as depicted by Hiroshige in The Fifty-three Stations of the Tōkaidō

Mitsuke-juku (見附宿, Mitsuke-juku) was the twenty-eighth of the fifty-three stations of the Tōkaidō. It is located in what is now the central part of the city of Iwata, Shizuoka Prefecture, Japan. The post station received its name, which means "with a view," because it was the first place from which Mount Fuji could be seen by travelers coming from Kyoto.

== History ==
Mitsuke-juku is located on the left bank of the Tenryū River, but boats generally used the nearby Ōi River, as it had a deeper channel and fewer difficult places to navigate. However, much like Shimada-juku, whenever the Ōi River overflowed, travel through the town became impossible.

In addition to being a post station, Mitsuke-juku also flourished as the entry to Tōtōmi Province's Mitsuke Tenjin Shrine (見附天神, Mitsuke Tenjin) and as the point at which the Tōkaidō separated with a hime kaidō.

When the Tōkaidō Main Line railway was established, the train station was built to the south of Mitsuke in the village of Nakaizumi. In 1940, Mitsuke and Nakaizumi merged, forming the town of Iwata, which became a city in 1948.

The classic ukiyo-e print by Andō Hiroshige (Hōeidō edition) from 1831–1834 depicts travelers changing boats on a sandbank while crossing the Tenryū River by ferry.

== Neighboring post towns ==
Tōkaidō
Fukuroi-juku - Mitsuke-juku - Hamamatsu-juku
