= Hatanagi-II Dam =

Hatanagi-II Hydroelectric Dam
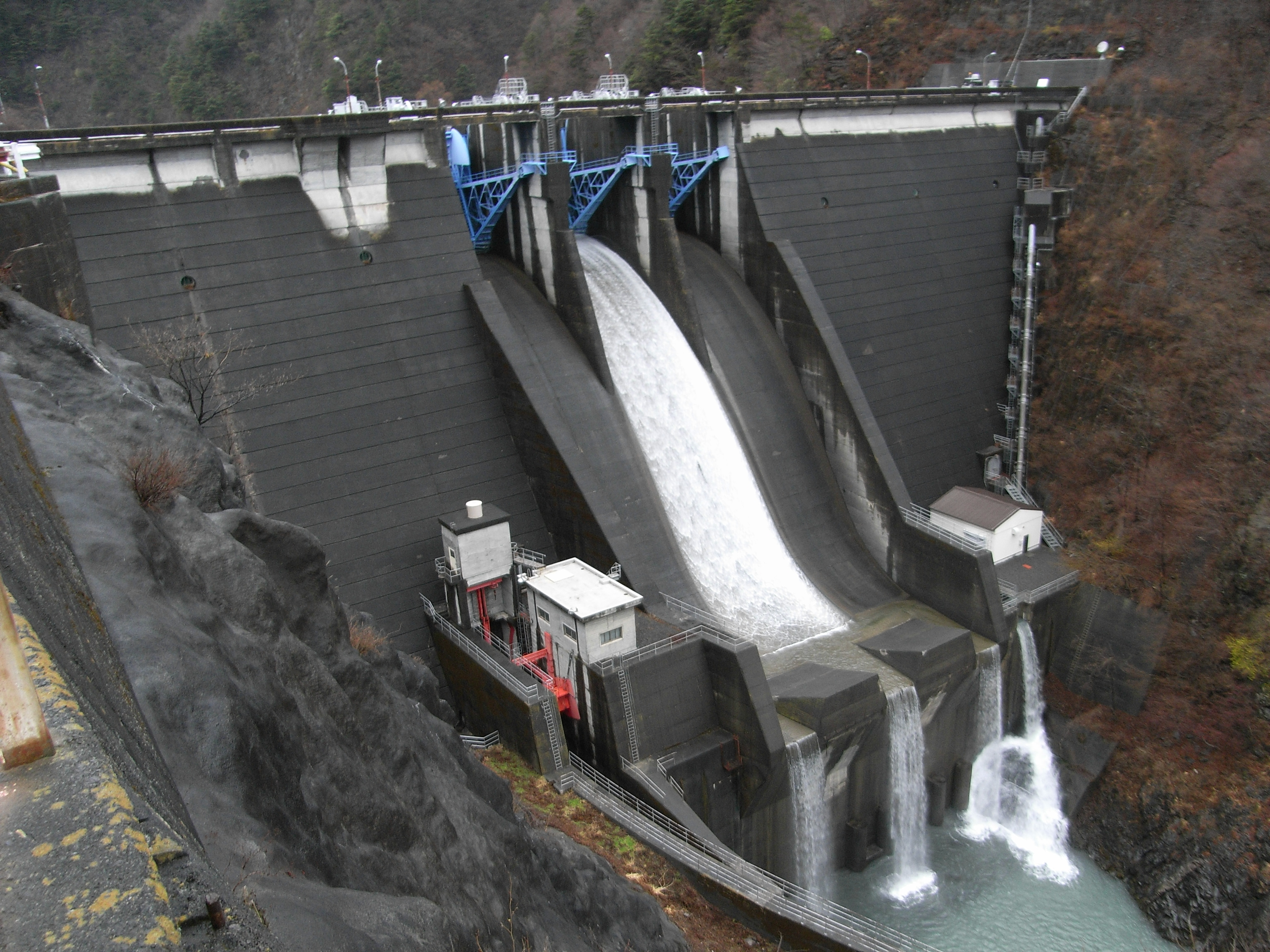
- Interactive map of Hatanagi-II Hydroelectric Dam
- Official name: 畑薙第第二ダム
- Location: Shizuoka Prefecture, Japan
- Coordinates: 35°18′28.7″N 138°12′11.5″E
- Construction began: 1957
- Opening date: 1961
- Operator: Chubu Electric Power

Dam and spillways
- Type of dam: Gravity
- Impounds: Ōi River
- Height: 69 m (226 ft)
- Length: 171 m (561 ft)

Reservoir
- Total capacity: 11,400,000 m^{3} (400,000,000 cu ft)
- Catchment area: 329.2 km^{2} (127.1 sq mi)
- Surface area: 45 ha (110 acres)

The Hatanagi-II (畑薙第二ダム, Hatanagi dai-ni-damu) is a dam on the Ōi River in Aoi-ku, Shizuoka, Shizuoka Prefecture on the island of Honshū, Japan. A hollow-core concrete gravity dam, it has a hydroelectric power generating station owned by the Chubu Electric Power Company.

== History ==
The potential of the Ōi River valley for hydroelectric power development was realized by the Meiji government at the start of the 20th century. The Ōi River was characterized by a high volume of flow and a fast current. Its mountainous upper reaches and tributaries were areas of steep valleys and abundant rainfall, and were sparsely populated. Design work began in 1902 by the Japan Electric Generation and Transmission Company (日本発送電株式会社, Nippon Hassoden K.K) and the first dam on the Ōi River (the Tashiro Dam) was completed in 1927. Further work was suspended by the Great Depression of the 1930s, and World War II in the 1940s. However, by the early 1950s, Japan’s need for electrical energy was growing exponentially. The Ōigawa Railway Ikawa Line was expanded to facilitate dam construction, and the newly created Chubu Electric Power Company received a loan from the United Nations Bank for Reconstruction and Development on September 10, 1958 to fund the project. Construction was completed by December 1961, and the system came into operation in early 1962.

== Design ==
The Hatanagi Project was designed as a Pumped-storage hydroelectricity facility, with the discharge from Hatanagi-I discharging through a five kilometer penstock into a lake created by the smaller Hatanagi No.2 Dam downstream. The reversible turbine generators at the Hatanagi No.1 power plant were designed to function as either electrical power generators, or as pumps, to reverse the flow of water back into the reservoir in times of low demand. The generators at the Hatanagi No.1 power plant have a capacity of 137,000 kW, and a maximum flow rate of 137 m^{3}/s. The Hatanagi No.2 power plant adds an additional 85,000 kW to the electrical grid of the Tōkai region of central Japan.

== Surroundings ==
The Hatanagi-II is located in the Minami Alps National Park, an area of high mountains, forests, and a popular vacation area. Public access to the dam and its lake are by Shizuoka Prefectural Road 60, with bus connections to Ikawa Station or directly with Shizuoka Station or Shin-Shizuoka Station. The dam itself and its associated electrical power plant are not open to the public.

== See also ==
- Hatanagi-I Hydroelectric Dam
- List of power stations in Japan

== Notes ==
- Japan Commission on Large Dams. Dams in Japan: Past, Present and Future. CRC Press (2009). ISBN 978-0-415-49432-8
