= Hatanagi-I Dam =

Hatanagi-I Hydroelectric Dam
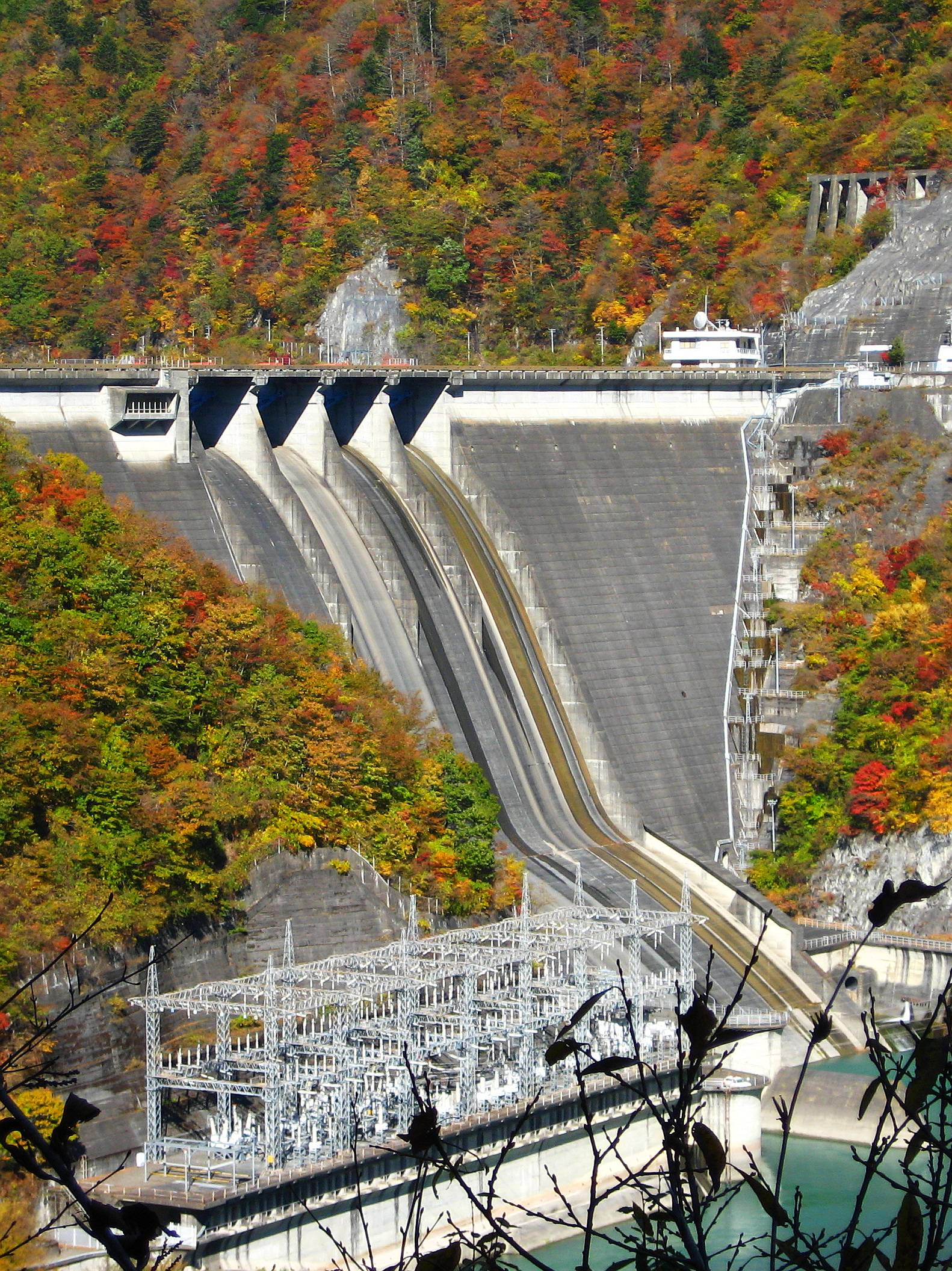
- Interactive map of Hatanagi-I Hydroelectric Dam
- Official name: 畑薙第一ダム
- Location: Shizuoka Prefecture, Japan
- Coordinates: 35°19′17″N 138°10′59″E
- Construction began: 1957
- Opening date: 1961
- Operator: Chubu Electric Power

Dam and spillways
- Type of dam: Gravity
- Impounds: Ōi River
- Height: 125 m (410 ft)
- Length: 275 m (902 ft)

Reservoir
- Creates: Lake Hatanagi
- Total capacity: 107,400,000 m^{3} (3.79×10^{9} cu ft)
- Catchment area: 318 km^{2} (123 sq mi)
- Surface area: 251 ha (620 acres)

The Hatanagi-I (畑薙第一ダム, Hatanagi dai-ichi damu) is a dam on the Ōi River in Aoi-ku, Shizuoka, Shizuoka Prefecture on the island of Honshū, Japan. With a height of 125 metres (410 ft), it is the tallest hollow-core concrete gravity dam in the world. It has a hydroelectric power generating station owned by the Chubu Electric Power Company. It supports a 137 megawatts (184,000 hp) pumped-storage hydroelectric power station.

== History ==
The potential of the Ōi River valley for hydroelectric power development was realized by the Meiji government at the start of the 20th century. The Ōi River was characterized by a high volume of flow and a fast current. Its mountainous upper reaches and tributaries were areas of steep valleys and abundant rainfall, and were sparsely populated. Design work began in 1902 by the Japan Electric Generation and Transmission Company (日本発送電株式会社, Nippon Hassoden K.K) and the first dam on the Ōi River (the Tashiro Dam) was completed in 1927. Further work was suspended by the Great Depression of the 1930s, and World War II in the 1940s. However, by the early 1950s, Japan's need for electrical energy was growing exponentially. The Ōigawa Railway Ikawa Line was expanded to facilitate dam construction, and the newly created Chubu Electric Power Company received a loan from the United Nations Bank for Reconstruction and Development on September 10, 1958 to fund the project. Construction was completed by December 1961, and the system came into operation in early 1962.

== Design ==
The Hatanagi Project was designed as a pumped-storage hydroelectricity facility, with the discharge from Hatanagi No.1 Dam discharging through a 5 kilometres (3.1 mi) penstock into a lake created by the smaller Hatanagi No.2 Dam downstream. The reversible turbine generators at the Hatanagi No.1 power plant were designed to function as either electrical power generators, or as pumps, to reverse the flow of water back to the reservoir in times of low demand. The generators have a capacity of 137 megawatts (184,000 hp), and a maximum flow rate of 137 m^{3}/s.

The lake created by the dam Hatanagi (畑薙湖, Hatanagi-ko) serves as an important source of tap water, industrial water and irrigation water in Shizuoka Prefecture.

== Surroundings ==
The Hatanagi-I is located in the Minami Alps National Park, an area of high mountains, forests, and a popular vacation area. Public access to the dam and its lake are by Shizuoka Prefectural Road 60, with bus connections to Ikawa Station or directly with Shizuoka Station or Shin-Shizuoka Station.

== See also ==
- Hatanagi-II Hydroelectric Dam
- List of power stations in Japan
