= List of cultural properties of Japan – historical materials (Shizuoka) =

This list is of the cultural properties of Japan designated in the category of historical materials (歴史資料, rekishi shiryō) for the prefecture of Shizuoka.

== National Cultural Properties ==
As of 1 February 2015, three Important Cultural Properties have been designated, being of national significance.

Property	Date	Municipality	Ownership	Comments	Image	Coordinates	Ref.
Photographs relating to the Egawa Family 江川家関係写真; Egawa-ke kankei shashin	C19/20	Izunokuni	Egawa Bunko (江川文庫)	461 items, including a photograph (pictured) of Egawa Hidetoshi (江川英敏) by Nakahama Manjirō		35°03′18″N 138°57′30″E	
Materials relating to Tokugawa Ieyasu 徳川家康関係資料; Tokugawa Ieyasu kankei shashin	Edo period	Shizuoka	Kunōzan Tōshō-gū	169 items dedicated to Kunōzan Tōshōgū; official documents, paintings, writings, and personal effects, including an incense set, tea utensils, medical implements, arms and armour, horse trappings, and a clock given by Philip III of Spain in 1611 after the rescue two years before of 317 of the 373 crew of a wrecked Spanish ship and their repatriation on a ship designed by William Adams; the clock, inscribed Hans de Evalo Me Fecit En Madrid A 1581, is preserved along with its leather case		34°57′53″N 138°28′03″E	
Materials relating to the Egawa Family Nirayama Magistrates 韮山代官江川家関係資料; Nirayama Daikan Egawa-ke kankei shiryō	C16 to C20	Izunokuni	Egawa Bunko (江川文庫)	38,581 items		35°03′18″N 138°57′30″E	

== Prefectural Cultural Properties ==
As of 1 December 2013, two properties have been designated at a prefectural level.

Property	Date	Municipality	Ownership	Comments	Image	Coordinates	Ref.
Materials relating to the Arai Barrier 新居関所関係資料; Arai sekisho kankei shiryō		Kosai	Kosai City (kept at Arai Barrier Archives)			34°41′42″N 137°33′42″E	
Embroidered Lotus Sutra 繍字法華経1帖附１幅 shūji hokekyō ichi-jō tsuketari ichi hata		Numazu	Kōchō-ji (光長寺)			35°07′41″N 138°52′26″E	

== Municipal Cultural Properties ==
Properties designated at a municipal level include:

Property	Date	Municipality	Ownership	Comments	Image	Coordinates	Ref.
Items relating to Minamoto no Yoritomo 源頼朝関係遺品; Minamoto no Yoritomo kankei ihin		Kosai	Ōga-ji (応賀寺)			34°41′57″N 137°33′33″E	
Portrait said to be of Matsumoto Mikamaro 伝夏目甕麿肖像画 den-Matsumoto Mikamaro shōzōga		Kosai	private			34°41′15″N 137°30′09″E	

== See also ==
- Cultural Properties of Japan
- List of National Treasures of Japan (historical materials)
- List of Historic Sites of Japan (Shizuoka)
- Tōtōmi, Suruga and Izu Provinces
