= Nissaka-shuku =

Twenty-fifth of the 53 stations of the Tōkaidō in Japan

Coordinates: 34°48′10″N 138°04′33″E

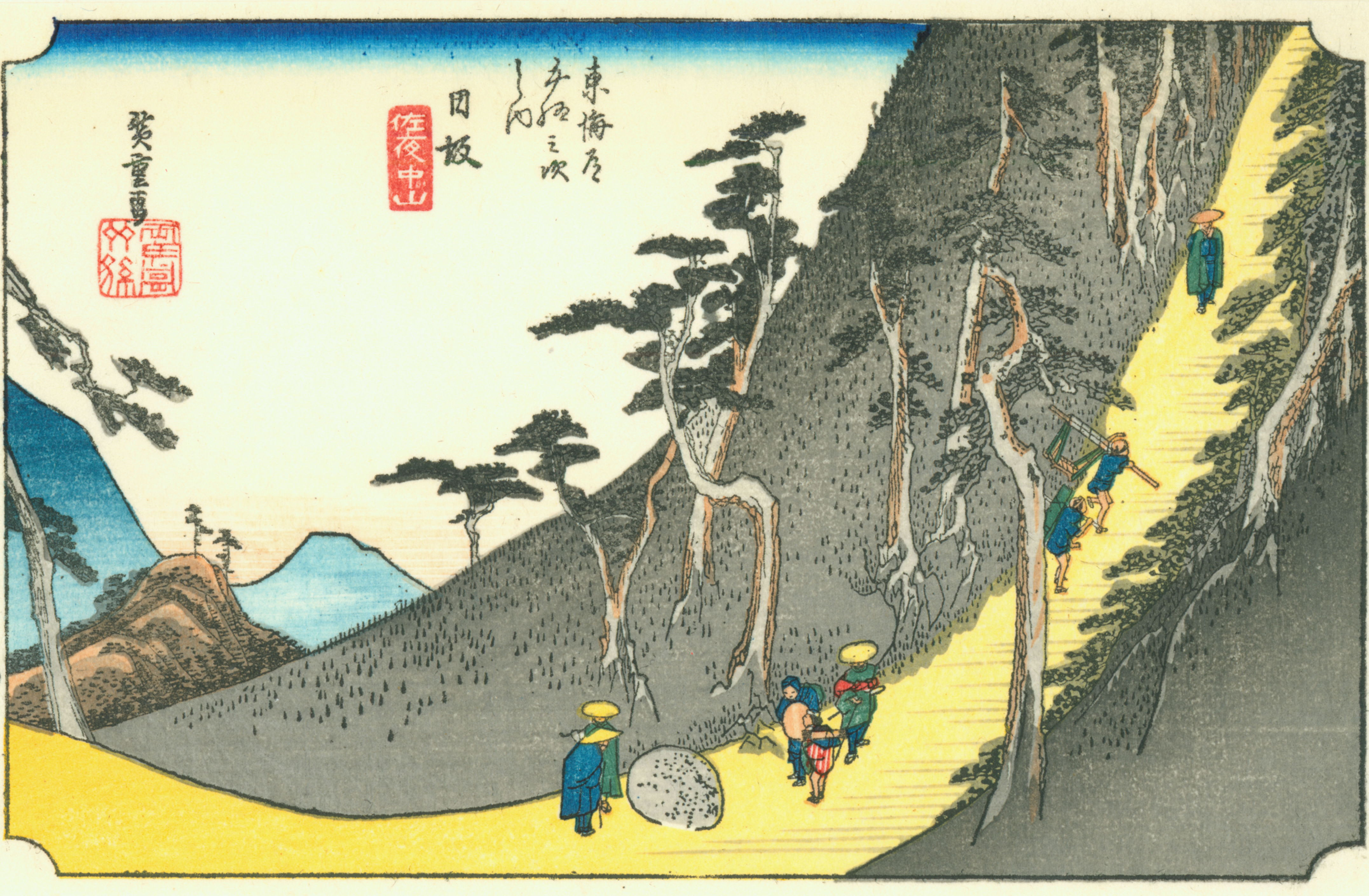
Nissaka-shuku in the 1830s, as depicted by Hiroshige in The Fifty-three Stations of the Tōkaidō

Nissaka-shuku (日坂宿, Nissaka-shuku) was the twenty-fifth of the fifty-three stations of the Tōkaidō. It is located in what is now part of the city of Kakegawa, Shizuoka Prefecture, Japan.

== History ==
Nissaka-shuku was located at the western entrance to Sayo no Nakayama (小夜の中山), regarded as one of the three difficult mountain passes along the Tōkaidō. At the western entrance of Nissaka-shuku is Kotonomama Hachimangū Shrine (事任八幡宮, Kotonomama Hachimangū).

Originally, various characters were used for Nissaka, including 入坂, 西坂 and 新坂, as it had been nothing more than a small town located between Kanaya-juku on the banks of the Ōi River and Kakegawa-juku, a castle town that was an intersection along an old salt trading route. When Nissaka-shuku was established as part of the Tōkaidō at the start of the Edo period, the characters for its name officially became 日坂.

The classic ukiyo-e print by Andō Hiroshige (Hōeidō edition) from 1831–1834 depicts travellers on a steep road in forbidding dark mountains contemplating a large boulder in the road. The stone was a noted landmark on Tōkaidō called the "Night weeping stone". According to legend, the bandits attacked and murdered a pregnant woman on this spot. After she died, a passing priest heard the stone call out for him to rescue the surviving infant.

The Tōkaidō Main Line railroad, established during the Meiji period, was built to avoid the difficult pass and, as a result, the fortunes of Nissaka-shuku began to fall. It began to prosper again when Route 1 was rebuilt after World War II, with the new route running through Nissaka.

In 1955, the village of Nissaka in Ogasa District merged with the neighboring city of Kakegawa.

== Ekiden ==
The city of Kakegawa hosts the Nissaka-juku Kago Ekiden (日坂宿駕籠駅伝) every year in April.

== Neighboring post towns ==
Tōkaidō
Kanaya-juku - Nissaka-shuku - Kakegawa-juku
