= Hiratsuka-juku =

Seventh of the 53 stations of the Tōkaidō in Japan

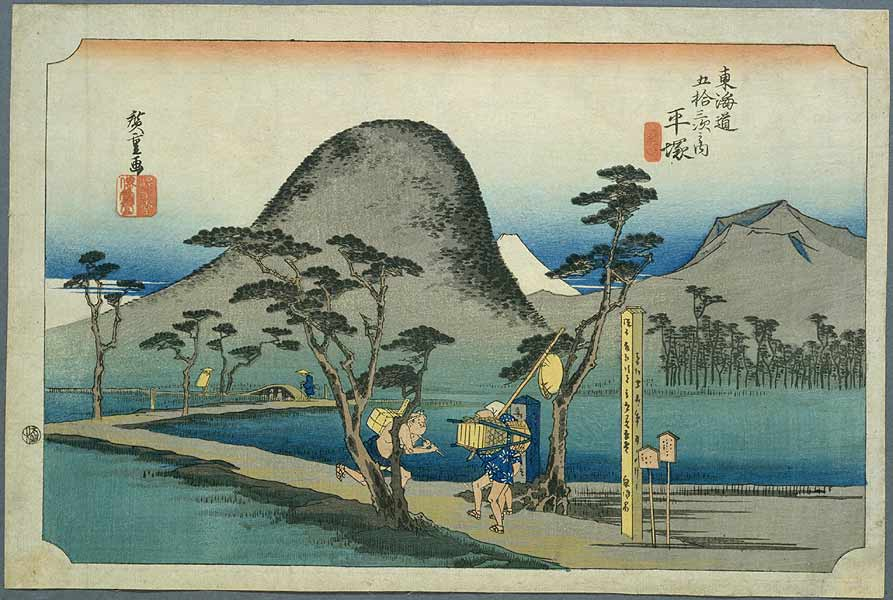
Hiratsuka-juku in the 1830s, as depicted by Hiroshige in the Hōeidō edition of The Fifty-three Stations of the Tōkaidō (1831–1834)

Hiratsuka-juku (平塚宿, Hiratsuka-juku) was the seventh of the fifty-three stations (shukuba) of the Tōkaidō. It is located in the present-day city of Hiratsuka, Kanagawa Prefecture, Japan.

== History ==
Hiratsuka-juku was first established in 1601, at the orders of Tokugawa Ieyasu. In 1651, though, it merged with part of the nearby village of Yawata. In 1655, it was renamed "Shinhiratsuka-juku."

During a census in 1843, the post station was found to have a population of 2,114 people and 443 houses, which included one honjin, 1 sub-honjin and 54 hatago. The classic ukiyo-e print by Andō Hiroshige (Hōeidō edition) from 1831–1834 does not depicts the post station at all, but instead shows a zig-zag road above marshy fields, with Mount Fuji appearing behind Shonan Daira in the background. One of the travelers is a professional courier running as part of the mail service offered along the Tōkaidō. Relays of runners could convey a message from Edo to Kyoto in 90 hours.

== Neighboring post towns ==
Tōkaidō
Fujisawa-shuku - Hiratsuka-juku - Ōiso-juku
