= Fukuroi-juku =

Twenty-seventh of the 53 stations of the Tōkaidō in Japan

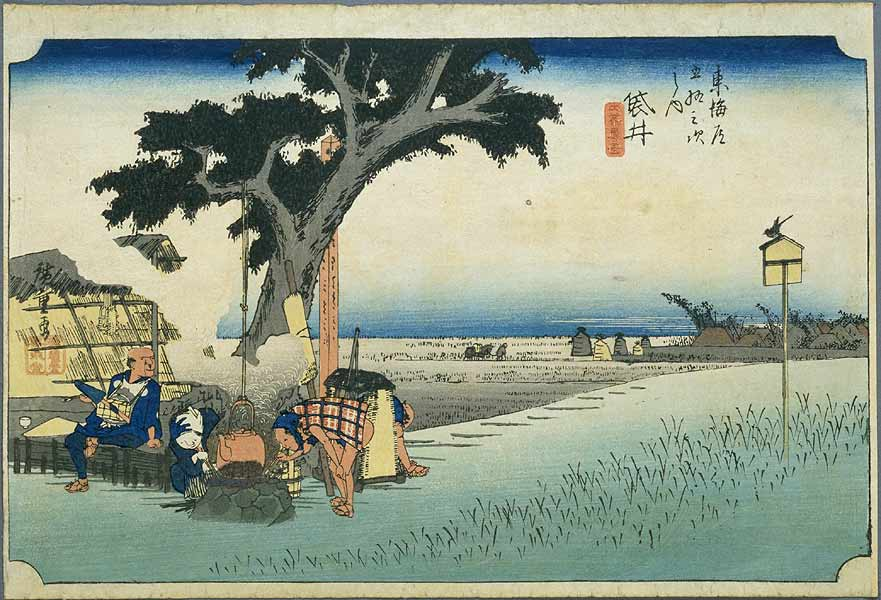
Fukuroi-juku in the 1830s, as depicted by Hiroshige in The Fifty-three Stations of the Tōkaidō

Fukuroi-juku (袋井宿, Fukuroi-juku) was the twenty-seventh of the fifty-three stations of the Tōkaidō, making it the center of the route. It is located in what is now the center of the city of Fukuroi, Shizuoka Prefecture, Japan.

== History ==
Fukuroi-juku was developed later than most of the other post stations, as it was not established until 1616. It is 9.7 km from Kakegawa-juku, the preceding post town. At its peak, Fukuroi-juku was home to 195 buildings, including three honjin and 50 hatago. Its total population was approximately 843 people.

Because it was in the vicinity of the former Tōtōmi Province's three major temples, collectively known as "Enshū Sanzan" (遠州三山), it also flourished as a gateway to them. The three temples were: Hattasan Sonei-ji (法多山尊永寺), Kasuisai (可睡斎), and Yusan-ji (油山寺).

The classic ukiyo-e print by Andō Hiroshige (Hōeidō edition) from 1831–1834 depicts a couple of travelers sheltering at a wayside lean-to, in front of which a woman stirs a large kettle hung from the branch of a large tree. The surrounding area appears to be featureless rice fields, with little indication of a post town.

== Neighboring post towns ==
Tōkaidō
Kakegawa-juku - Fukuroi-juku - Mitsuke-juku
