= Kakegawa-juku =

Twenty-sixth of the 53 stations of the Tōkaidō in Japan

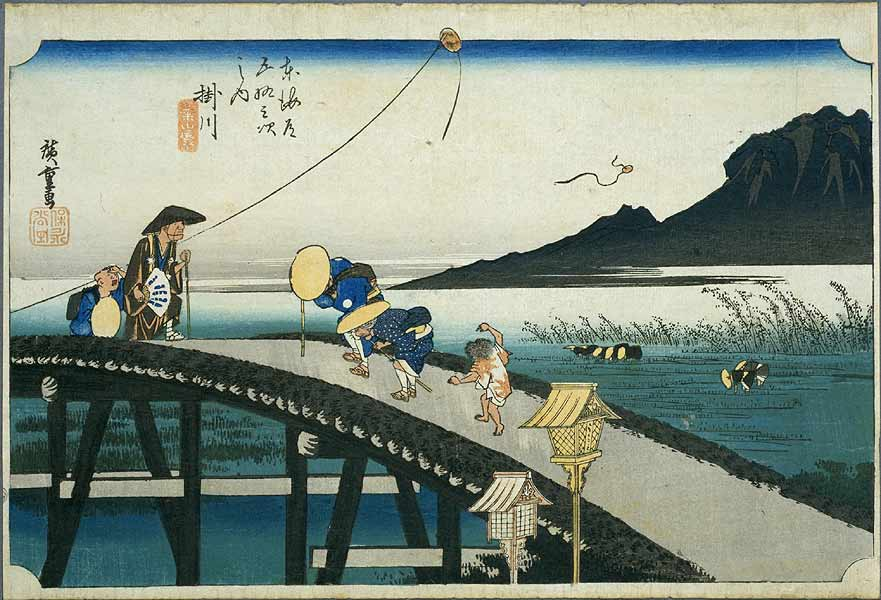
Kakegawa-juku in the 1830s, as depicted by Hiroshige in The Fifty-three Stations of the Tōkaidō

Kakegawa-juku (掛川宿, Kakegawa-juku) was the twenty-sixth of the fifty-three stations of the Tōkaidō. It is located in what is now the city of Kakegawa, Shizuoka Prefecture, Japan.

== History ==
Kakegawa-juku was originally the castle town of Kakegawa Castle. It was famous because Yamauchi Kazutoyo rebuilt the area and lived there himself.

It also served as a post station along a salt road that ran through Shinano Province between the modern-day cities of Makinohara and Hamamatsu.

The classic ukiyo-e print by Andō Hiroshige (Hōeidō edition) from 1831–1834 depicts travelers crossing a trestle-bridge. An old couple struggles against the wind, followed by a boy making a mocking gesture. Two monks approach from the opposite end of the bridge. One of them is looking at the kite. In the background, peasants are planting rice and in the distance, Mount Akiba is shown in the mists.

== Neighboring post towns ==
Tōkaidō
Nissaka-shuku - Kakegawa-juku - Fukuroi-juku
