= Ōiso-juku =

Eighth of the 53 stations of the Tōkaidō in Japan

Coordinates: 35.30907°N 139.31520°E

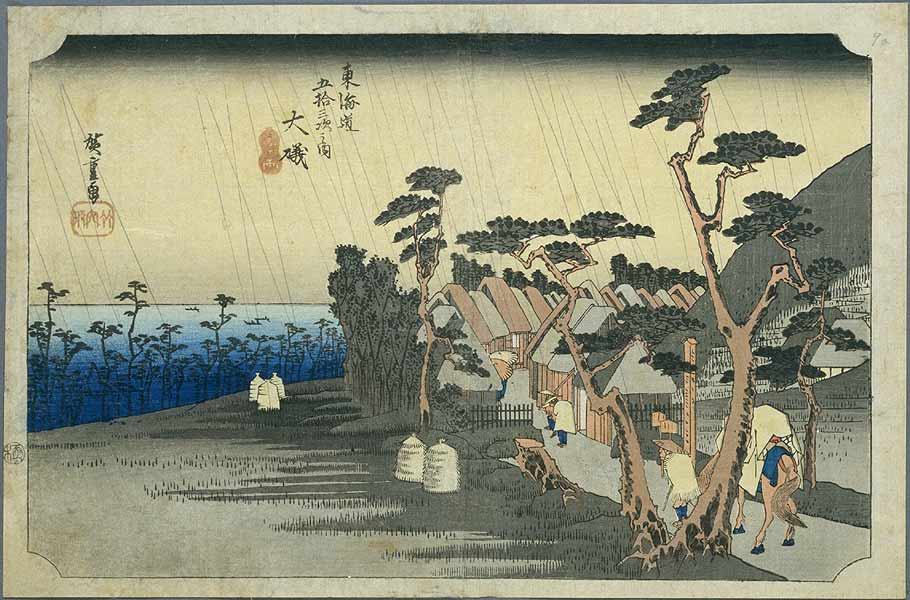
Ōiso-juku in the 1830s, as depicted by Hiroshige in the Hōeidō edition of The Fifty-three Stations of the Tōkaidō (1831–1834)

Ōiso-juku (大磯宿, Ōiso-juku) was the eighth of the fifty-three stations (shukuba) of the Tōkaidō. It is located in the present-day town of Ōiso, located in Naka District, Kanagawa Prefecture, Japan.

== History ==
Ōiso-juku was established in 1601, along with the other original post stations along the Tōkaidō, by Tokugawa Ieyasu. In 1604, Ieyasu planted a 3.9 km (2.4 mi) colonnade of pine and hackberry trees, to provide shade for the travelers.

The classic ukiyo-e print by Andō Hiroshige (Hōeidō edition) from 1831–1834 depicts travelers in straw raincoats entering a village by the ocean during pouring rain. One is mounted, and the other is on foot. The road is lined with pine trees. By contrast, the Kyōka edition of the late 1830s depicts a prosperous village overlooking a wide expanse of Sagami Bay with the mountains of the Izu Peninsula on the far shore.

== Neighboring post towns ==
Tōkaidō
Hiratsuka-juku - Ōiso-juku - Odawara-juku
