= Yoshiwara-juku =

Fourteenth of the 53 stations of the Tōkaidō in Japan

Coordinates: 35°09′45″N 138°41′16″E

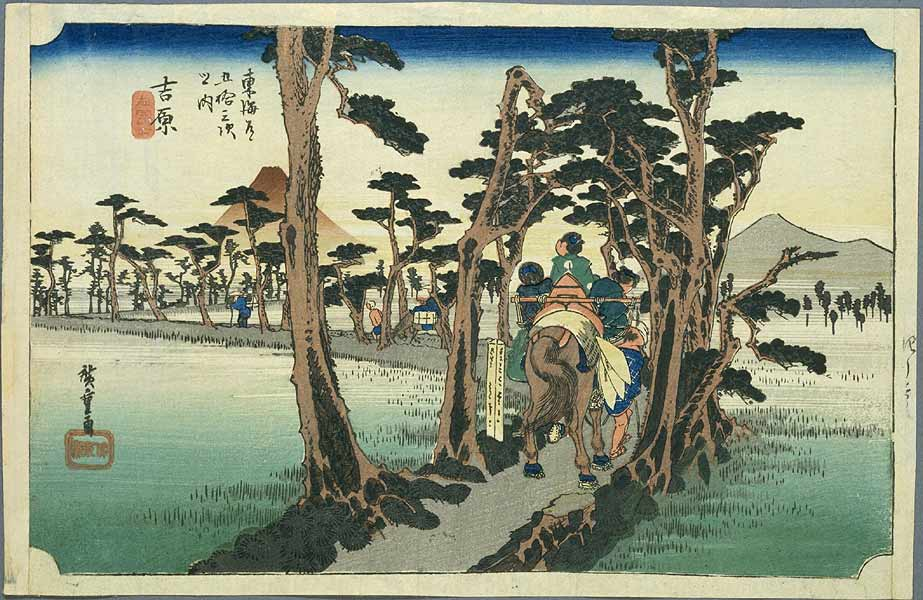
Yoshiwara-juku in the 1830s, as depicted by Hiroshige in the Hōeidō edition of The Fifty-three Stations of the Tōkaidō (1831–1834)

Yoshiwara-juku (吉原宿, Yoshiwara-juku) was the fourteenth of the fifty-three stations of the Tōkaidō. It is located in the present-day city of Fuji, Shizuoka Prefecture, Japan.

The Yoshiwara-juku Festival is held each year in October and November in Fuji, showing visitors the area's history.

== History ==
The Yoshiwara-juku was originally located near the present-day Yoshiwara Station, on the modern Tōkaidō Main Line railway, but after a very destructive tsunami in 1639, was rebuilt further inland, on what is now the Yodahara section of present-day Fuji. In 1680, the area was again devastated by a large tsunami, and the post town was again relocated and moved to its current place. Although most of the route of the Tōkaidō in Sagami and Suruga Provinces was along the seashore as the name "East Sea Route" implied, at Hara-juku travelers walked away from the sea. Also, up until this point on the journey, Mount Fuji could always be seen to the right of the travelers coming from Edo. However, as they traveled inland, they could see Mount Fuji to their left, and the view came to be called "Fuji to the Left" (左富士, Hidari Fuji).

During the Edo period, there was a long colonnade of pine trees lining the route along this point. This is depicted in the classic ukiyo-e print by Andō Hiroshige (Hōeidō edition) from 1831–1834 which shows a groom leading a horse with women travelers down a narrow path lined with pine trees with Mount Fuji to the left.

== Neighboring post towns ==
Tōkaidō
Hara-juku - Yoshiwara-juku - Kanbara-juku
