= Hamamatsu-juku =

Twenty-ninth of the 53 stations of the Tōkaidō in Japan

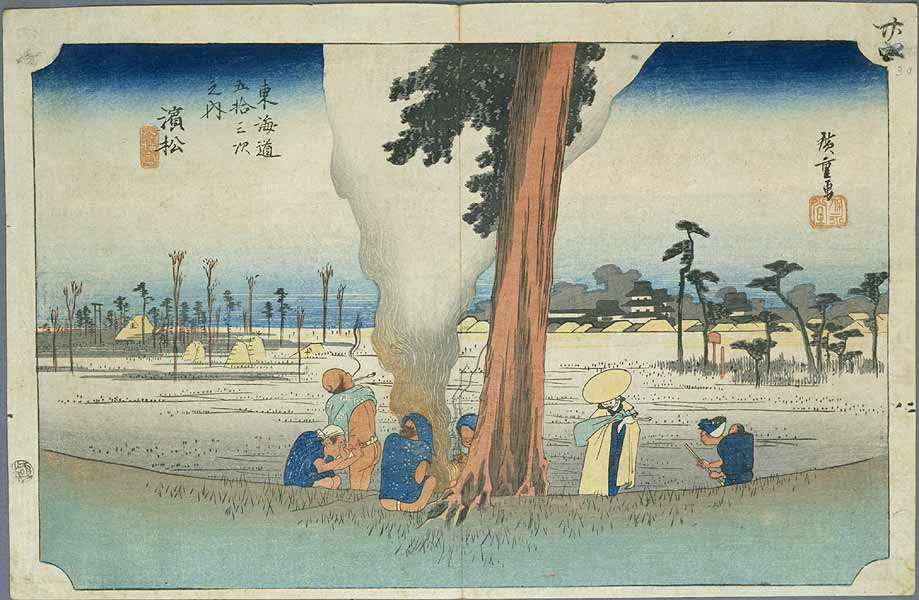
Hamamatsu-juku in the 1830s, as depicted by Hiroshige in The Fifty-three Stations of the Tōkaidō

Hamamatsu-juku (浜松宿, Hamamatsu-juku) was the twenty-ninth of the fifty-three stations (shukuba) of the Tōkaidō. It is located in what is now Hamamatsu's Chūō-ku in Shizuoka Prefecture, Japan.

== History ==
During the Tenpō era (1830–1844), Hamamatsu-juku was located in Hamamatsu Castle's castle town. At the time, there were six honjin and 94 hatago for travelers to use, making it the largest post station in Tōtōmi and Suruga provinces. At the time, it was located on the right bank of the Tenryū River, but, over time, the river's course changed, so the post station is now approximately six kilometers from the river's edge.

The classic ukiyo-e print by Andō Hiroshige (Hōeidō edition) from 1831–1834 depicts a rural scene with Hamamatsu Castle and the town in the far distance. A group of peasants are warming themselves by a bonfire, with a traveler looking on.

== Neighboring post towns ==
Tōkaidō
Mitsuke-juku - Hamamatsu-juku - Maisaka-juku
