= Numazu-juku =

Twelfth of the 53 stations of the Tōkaidō in Japan

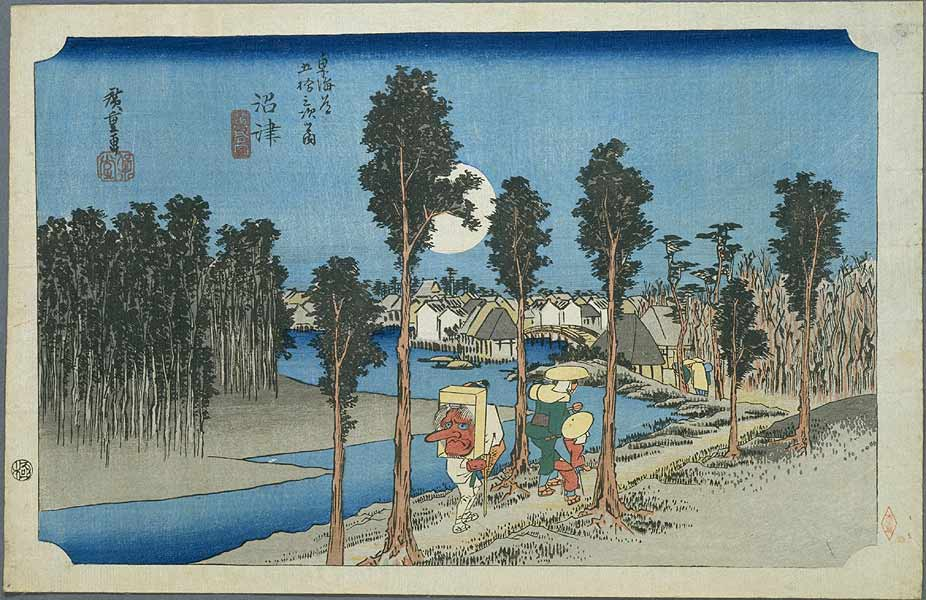
Numazu-juku in the 1830s, as depicted by Hiroshige in the Hoeido edition of The Fifty-three Stations of the Tōkaidō (1831-1834)

Numazu-juku (沼津宿, Numazu-juku) was the twelfth of the fifty-three stations of the Tōkaidō. It is located in the present-day city of Numazu, Shizuoka Prefecture, Japan.

== History ==
Numazu was the easternmost post station within Suruga Province, and was the castle town of the daimyō of Numazu Domain. During its peak in the Edo period, Numazu-juku had over 1,200 buildings, including three honjin, one sub-honjin, and 55 hatago. Modern Numazu city has a local history museum displaying the history of the area.

The classic ukiyo-e print by Andō Hiroshige (Hōeido edition) from 1831 to 1834 depicts travelers walking along a tree-lined river bank, towards Numazu-shuku, under a huge full moon in a deep blue sky. One of the travelers is wearing the white robes of a pilgrim, and is carrying a huge Tengu mask on his back, indicating that his destination is the famed Shinto shrine of Konpira on Shikoku.

== Neighboring post towns ==
Tōkaidō
Mishima-shuku - Numazu-juku - Hara-juku
