= Kanaya-juku =

Twenty-fourth of the 53 stations of the Tōkaidō in Japan

Coordinates: 34°49′N 138°08′E

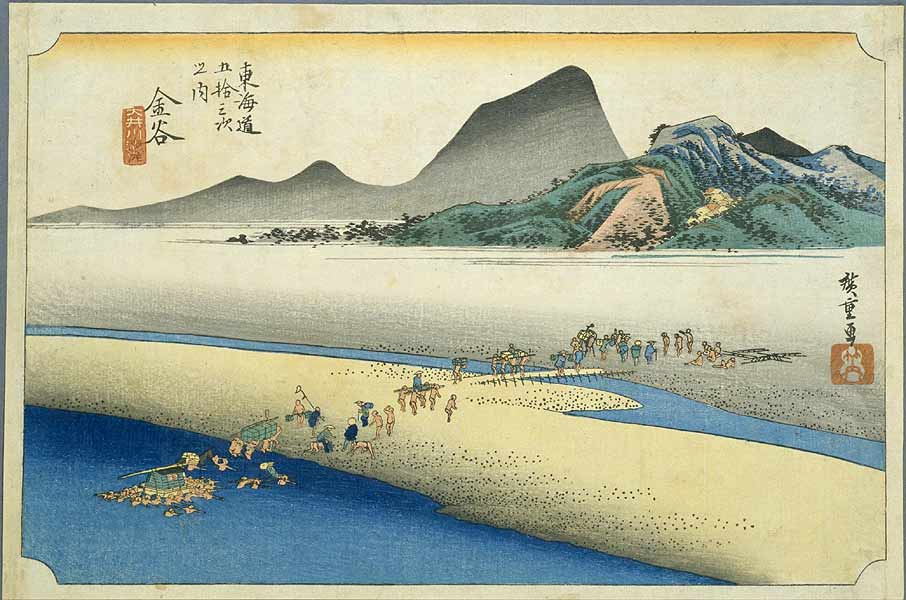
Kanaya-juku in the 1830s, as depicted by Hiroshige in The Fifty-three Stations of the Tōkaidō

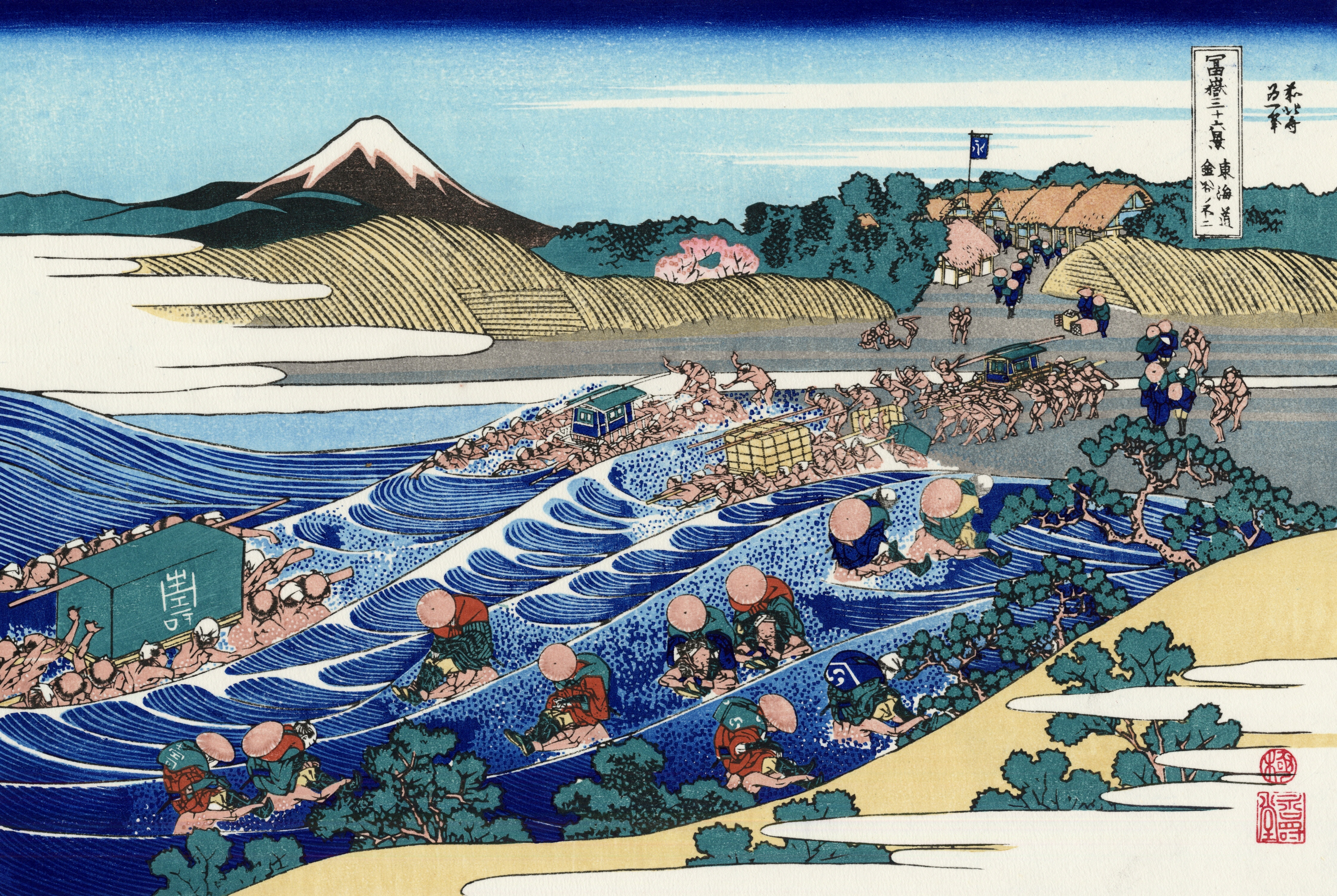
Hokusai

Kanaya-juku (金谷宿, Kanaya-juku) was the twenty-fourth of the fifty-three stations of the Tōkaidō. It is located in what is now part of Shimada, Shizuoka Prefecture, Japan. During the Edo period, it was the easternmost post station of Tōtōmi Province.

== History ==
Kanaya-juku was built up on the right bank of the Ōi River across from Shimada-juku. There were over 1,000 buildings in the post town, including three honjin, one sub-honjin and 51 hatago. Travelers had an easy travel to Nissaka-shuku, which was about 6.5 km (4.0 mi) away. However, whenever the river's banks overflowed, travelers were not able to pass through Kanaya and on to Shimada-juku, as the Tokugawa shogunate had expressly forbidden the construction of any bridge on the Ōi River.

The classic ukiyo-e print by Andō Hiroshige (Hōeido edition) from 1831–1834 depicts a daimyō procession on sankin-kōtai crossing the river. The daimyō is riding in a kago, held above the water by a makeshift platform carried by numerous porters. His retainers are attempting to wade across the river. In the background, a small village is shown in the foothills.

== Neighboring post towns ==
Tōkaidō
Shimada-juku - Kanaya-juku - Nissaka-shuku
