= Arai-juku =

Thirty-first of the 53 stations of the Tōkaidō in Japan

Coordinates: 34.694726°N 137.561338°E

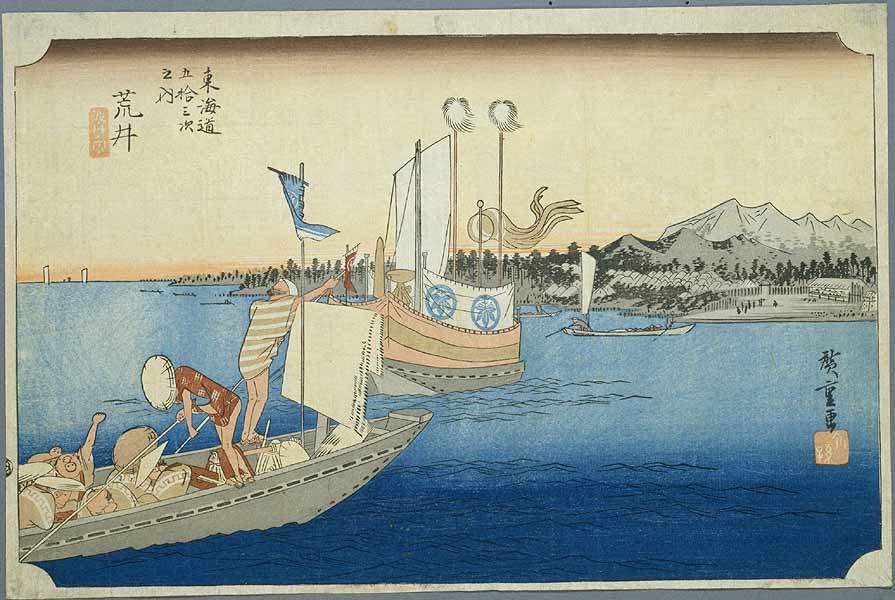
Arai-juku in the 1830s, as depicted by Hiroshige in The Fifty-three Stations of the Tōkaidō

Arai-juku (新居宿, Arai-juku) was the thirty-first of the fifty-three stations of the Tōkaidō. It is located in the city of Kosai, Shizuoka Prefecture, Japan. During the Edo period, it was located in Tōtōmi Province. The kanji for the post station were originally also written as 荒江 and 荒井 (Arai).

== History ==
Arai-juku was located on the western shores of Lake Hamana (浜名湖, Hamana-ko). Travelers crossed the lake to reach Maisaka-juku, the previous post station on the Tōkaidō. Though there were many checkpoints along the Tōkaidō, the Arai Checkpoint is the only one that existed both on land and on the water.

Both the checkpoint and post station were often damaged from earthquakes and tsunami, which led to them both being moved to different locations. The current location was established after the earthquake of 1707. The existing checkpoint building was used as a school after the checkpoint was abolished at the start of the Meiji period. It is now preserved as a museum dedicated to the history and culture of the post stations.

The Kii-no-kuni-ya (紀伊の国屋), a preserved hatago (旅籠) still remaining today, served as a rest spot for official travelers coming from Kii Province further south. It is now a local history museum.

The classic ukiyo-e print by Andō Hiroshige (Hoeido edition) from 1831–1834 depicts a daimyō procession on sankin-kōtai crossing between Maisaka-juku and Arai-juku by boat. The daimyō is in a large vessel with his family crest, while his retainers follow in a smaller boat with the baggage.

== Neighboring post towns ==
Tōkaidō
Maisaka-juku - Arai-juku - Shirasuka-juku
