= Harajuku (dance project) =

German band

- Genres: Eurodance
- Years active: 1992-1997
- Members: Tony O'Melley; Thorsten Schotten; Stephanie O'Hara

Harajuku is a Eurodance project founded in 1992 by German producer Ulrich Moorlampen (Tony O'Malley), together with his partner Thorsten Schotten. Their concept was to release dance versions of ballads from popular musicals.

== History ==
The Harajuku dance project is named after Harajuku, a major district in Tokyo, Japan. Harajuku is known for its colorful fashion, special outfits and an upscale lifestyle. The identity of the singer was kept secret until she was revealed to be German pop singer Kristina Bach. They engaged various singers until 1995 when unknown German singer Stephanie O'Hara (a.k.a. Stefanie Obst) signed on. O'Hara sang the majority of the songs in the album Just One Look. At this time, O'Hara was also the singer for appearance frames from numerous dancers. This appearance attracted attention to the London scene disco "The Fridge," which placed in the top 10 for British dance charts.

The first single, a dance version of the musical hit "The Phantom of the Opera", was a worldwide success. Its highest ranking on the US Billboard Maxisales charts was at 23, in 1993. In 1995, Just One Look was released.

== Composition and results ==
The debut single featuring Kristina Bach was the biggest success. It reached 21st in U.S. Billboard Maxi-sales charts/

Other chart entries included the dance version of the Elton John hit "Can You Feel the Love Tonight" from the Disney animated film The Lion King. It was the second biggest hit for the project, this time with singer Stephanie O'Hara. The production broke into the top 50 in the U.S. Billboard chart Maxi-managed sales. The group also managed the production of "Colors of the Wind".

== Discography ==
=== Albums ===
- Just One Look 1995
- The Best of Dance Mixes 2002

=== Singles ===
- The Phantom of the Opera 1992
- On My Own 1993
- The Phantom of the Opera - Remix 1994
- Colors of the Wind 1995
- Can You Feel the Love Tonight 1995
- Beauty and the Beast 1996
- Someday 1996
- This is the Moment / Someone Like You 1997
