= The Fifty-three Stations of the Tōkaidō =

Series of ukiyo-e by Utagawa Hiroshige

The Fifty-Three Stations of the Tōkaidō (東海道五十三次, Tōkaidō Gojūsan-tsugi), in the Hōeidō edition (1833–1834), is a series of ukiyo-e woodcut prints created by Utagawa Hiroshige after his first travel along the Tōkaidō in 1832.

The Tōkaidō road, linking the shōgun's capital, Edo, to the imperial one, Kyōto, was the main travel and transport artery of old Japan. It is also the most important of the "Five Roads" (Gokaidō)—the five major roads of Japan created or developed during the Edo period to further strengthen the control of the central shogunate administration over the whole country.

Even though the Hōeidō edition is by far the best known, The Fifty-Three Stations of the Tōkaidō was such a popular subject that it led Hiroshige to create some 30 different series of woodcut prints on it, all very different one from the other by their size (ōban or chuban), their designs or even their number (some series include just a few prints).

The Hōeidō edition of the Tōkaidō is Hiroshige's best known work, and the best sold ever ukiyo-e Japanese prints. Coming just after Hokusai's Thirty-six Views of Mount Fuji series, it established this new major theme of ukiyo-e, the landscape print, or fūkei-ga, with a special focus on "famous views".

== The Tōkaidō ==
The Tōkaidō was one of the Five Routes constructed under Tokugawa Ieyasu, a series of roads linking the historical capital of Edo with the rest of Japan. The Tōkaidō connected Edo with the then-capital of Kyoto. The most important and well-traveled of these, the Tōkaidō travelled along the eastern coast of Honshū, thus giving rise to the name Tōkaidō ("Eastern Sea Road"). Along this road, there were 53 different post stations, which provided stables, food, and lodging for travelers.

== Hiroshige and the Tōkaidō ==
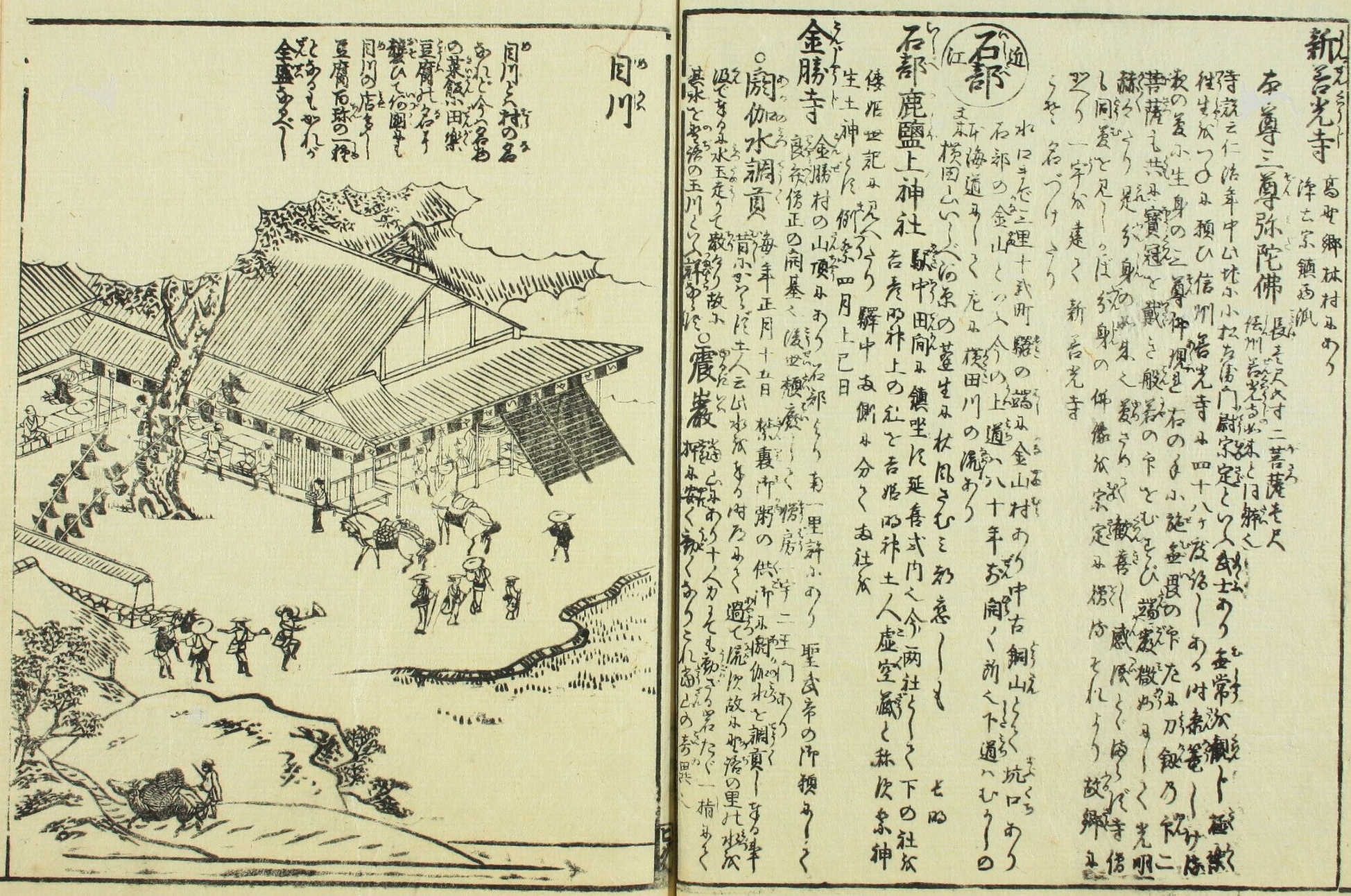
Illustration of Okabe from "Compilation of Views of Famous Sights along the Tōkaidō" (東海道名所図会, Tōkaidō meisho zue) station Ishibe (1797), which influenced Hiroshige

In 1832, Hiroshige traveled the length of the Tōkaidō from Edo to Kyoto, as part of an official delegation transporting horses that were to be presented to the imperial court. The horses were a symbolic gift from the shōgun, presented annually in recognition of the emperor's divine status.

The landscapes encountered during the journey left a profound impression on the artist, inspiring him to create numerous sketches throughout the trip and upon his return to Edo via the same route. Upon arriving home, he immediately commenced work on the first prints for The Fifty-Three Stations of the Tōkaidō. In the end, he completed a total of 55 prints for the entire series: one for each station along the Tōkaidō, as well as one for both the starting and ending points. But whether he actually visited all the stations and depicted them from his view is subject to academic debate, as some elements in his woodblock prints have been found to actually borrow directly from other works such as the Tōkaidō meisho zue (東海道名所図会) from 1797. An example is the view of the station Ishibe "Megawa Village" which is almost identical to the view in the Tōkaidō meisho zue.

The first of the prints in the series was published jointly by the publishing houses of Hōeidō and Senkakudō, with the former handling all subsequent releases on its own. Woodcuts of this style commonly sold as new for between 12 and 16 copper coins apiece, approximately the same price as a pair of straw sandals or a bowl of soup. The runaway success of The Fifty-Three Stations of the Tōkaidō established Hiroshige as the most prominent and successful printmaker of the Tokugawa era.

Hiroshige followed up on this series with The Sixty-nine Stations of the Kiso Kaidō in cooperation with Keisai Eisen, documenting each of the post stations of the Nakasendō (which was alternatively referred to as the Kiso Kaidō).

== The Fifty-three Stations of the Tōkaidō (Hōeidō edition) ==
The Hōeidō edition is properly titled Tōkaidō Gojūsan-tsugi no uchi (東海道五十三次之内). Besides the fifty-three stations themselves, the series includes one print for the departure, Nihonbashi (the bridge of Japan), and a final one, the 55th print, Keishi, Kyoto, the imperial capital.

No.	Woodcut print	Station no. and English name	Japanese	Transliteration
1	First edition: Second edition:	Leaving Edo : Nihonbashi, (The bridge of Japan)	日本橋	Nihonbashi
2		1st station : Shinagawa. (Note: Shinagawa overlooked the Shinagawa bay, south of Edo; the seashore was strewn with brothels, where courtesans received their clients. Balconies were overlooking the beautiful seascapes of the bay, depicted by Kiyonage in his famous series of diptychs, Minami no Juniko (the twelve months of the South))	品川	Shinagawa
3		2nd station : Kawasaki	川崎	Kawasaki
4		3rd station : Kanagawa	神奈川	Kanagawa
5		4th station : Hodogaya	程ヶ谷, 保土ヶ谷	Hodogaya
6		5th station : Totsuka	戸塚	Totsuka
7		6th station : Fujisawa	藤沢	Fujisawa
8		7th station : Hiratsuka	平塚	Hiratsuka
9		8th station : Oiso (Rain on a town by the coast)	大磯	Oiso
10		9th station : Odawara (Crossing the Sakawa river at a ford)	小田原	Odawara
11		10th station : Hakone (High rocks by a lake)	箱根	Hakone
12		11th station : Mishima (Travellers passing a shrine in the mist)	三島	Mishima
13		12th station : Numazu	沼津	Numazu
14		13th station : Hara (Travellers passing Mount Fuji)	原	Hara
15		14th station : Yoshiwara	吉原	Yoshiwara
16		15th station : Kanbara (A village in the snow)	蒲原	Kanbara
17		16th station : Yui (Travellers on a high cliff by the sea)	由井, 由比	Yui
18		17th station : Okitsu	興津	Okitsu
19		18th station : Ejiri	江尻	Ejiri
20		19th station : Fuchū	府中, 駿府	Fuchū
21		20th station : Mariko (A roadside restaurant)	鞠子, 丸子	Mariko
22		21st station : Okabe	岡部	Okabe
23		22nd station : Fujieda	藤枝	Fujieda
24		23rd station : Shimada	島田	Shimada
25		24th station : Kanaya (Crossing a wide river)	金屋, 金谷	Kanaya
26		25th station : Nissaka	日坂	Nissaka
27		26th station : Kakegawa	掛川	Kakegawa
28		27th station : Fukuroi	袋井	Fukuroi
29		28th station : Mitsuke	見附	Mitsuke
30		29th station : Hamamatsu	浜松	Hamamatsu
31		30th station : Maisaka	舞阪	Maisaka
32		31st station : Arai	荒井, 新居	Arai
33		32nd station : Shirasuka	白須賀	Shirasuka
34		33rd station : Futagawa	二川	Futagawa
35		34th station : Yoshida	吉田	Yoshida
36		35th station : Goyu	御油	Goyu
37		36th station : Akasaka	赤坂	Akasaka
38		37th station : Fujikawa	藤川	Fujikawa
39		38th station : Okazaki	岡崎	Okazaki
40		39th station : Chiryu	池鯉鮒, 知立	Chiryu
41		40th station : Narumi	鳴海	Narumi
42		41st station : Miya	宮	Miya
43		42nd station : Kuwana	桑名	Kuwana
44		43rd station : Yokkaichi	四日市	Yokkaichi
45		44th station : Ishiyakushi	石薬師	Ishiyakushi
46		45th station : Shōno (Note: Shōno is one of the most famous prints of the whole series.) (Travellers surprised by sudden rain)	庄野	Shōno
47		46th station : Kameyama (A castle on a snow-covered slope)	亀山	Kameyama
48		47th station : Seki (Departure from the inn)	関	Seki
49		48th station : Sakashita	坂下	Sakashita
50		49th station : Tsuchiyama	土山	Tsuchiyama
51		50th station : Minakuchi	水口	Minakuchi
52		51st station : Ishibe	石部	Ishibe
53		52nd station : Kusatsu	草津	Kusatsu
54		53rd station : Otsu	大津	Otsu
55		The end of the Tōkaidō: arriving at Kyoto.	京師	Sanjō Ōhashi at Keishi ("the capital")

== Historical impact ==
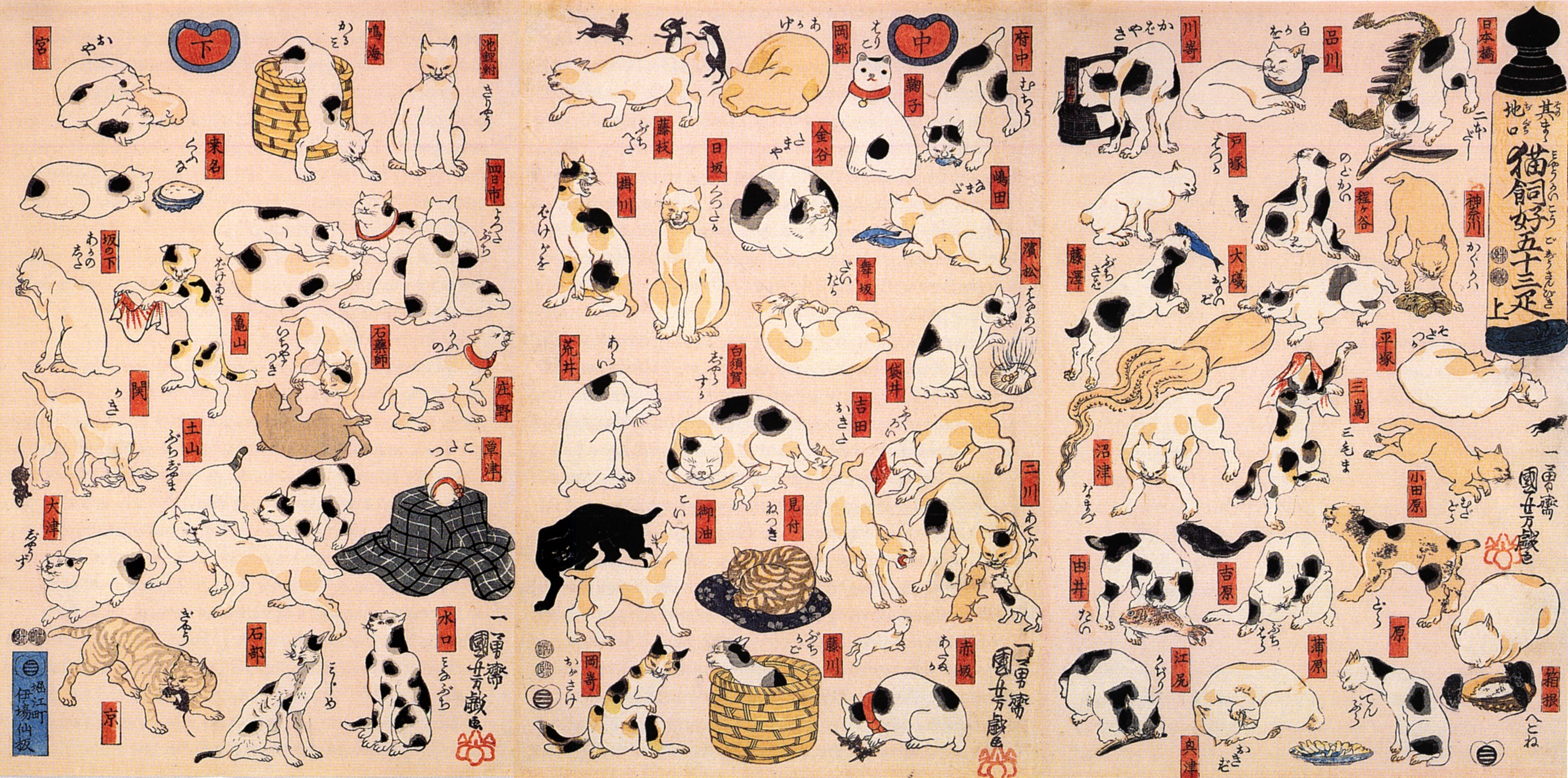
Cats Suggested As The Fifty-three Stations of the Tōkaidō, 1850

In 1850, Utagawa Kuniyoshi created his woodblock print inspired by the Hiroshige's, called Cats Suggested As The Fifty-three Stations of the Tōkaidō. Unlike Hiroshige, Kuniyoshi showed every station not with a landscape, but with "cat puns".

During his time in Paris, Vincent van Gogh was an avid collector of ukiyo-e, amassing with his brother a collection of several hundred prints purchased in the gallery of S. Bing. This collection included works from The Fifty-Three Stations of the Tōkaidō, and Van Gogh incorporated stylistic elements from his collection into his own work, such as bright colors, natural details, and unconventional perspectives. In his personal correspondence, he stated, "all of my work is founded on Japanese art", and described the Impressionists as "the Japanese of France".

Architect Frank Lloyd Wright was an enthusiastic collector of Hiroshige's prints, including those of The Fifty-Three Stations of the Tōkaidō. In 1906, he staged the first ever retrospective of Hiroshige's work at the Art Institute of Chicago, describing them in the exhibition catalog as some of "the most valuable contributions ever made to the art of the world". Two years later, he contributed elements of his collection to another exhibition of ukiyo-e at the Art Institute. Wright also designed the gallery space of the exhibit, which at that time was the largest display of its kind in history. Appreciating the prints on a professional level as well as an aesthetic one, Wright mined his prints for insights into the nature of designing structures, modifying damaged prints by adding lines and shadow in an effort to understand their operating principles.

Hiroshige's Tokaidō prints have since been referenced in popular culture. Weezer's 1996 album Pinkerton, for example, uses Kanbara as its cover art.

In 2012, British contemporary artist Carl Randall created paintings of the people and places along the contemporary Tokaido Highway, walking in the footsteps of the Japanese ukiyo-e printmaker Andō Hiroshige. The project resulted in a group of 15 paintings exhibited at the National Portrait Gallery in London as part of The 2013 BP Portrait Award exhibition, under the title "In the Footsteps of Hiroshige - The Tokaido Highway and Portraits of Modern Japan". The exhibition subsequently toured to The Aberdeen Art Gallery Scotland, and then formed his solo exhibition in Japan ‘Portraits from Edo to the Present’ at The Shizuoka City Tokaido Hiroshige Museum, where the paintings were exhibited alongside Hiroshige's original The Fifty-three Stations of the Tōkaidō woodblock prints.

== See also ==
- The Sixty-nine Stations of the Kiso Kaidō by Hiroshige
