= Shimada-juku =

Twenty-third of the 53 stations of the Tōkaidō in Japan

Coordinates: 34°50′05″N 138°09′57″E

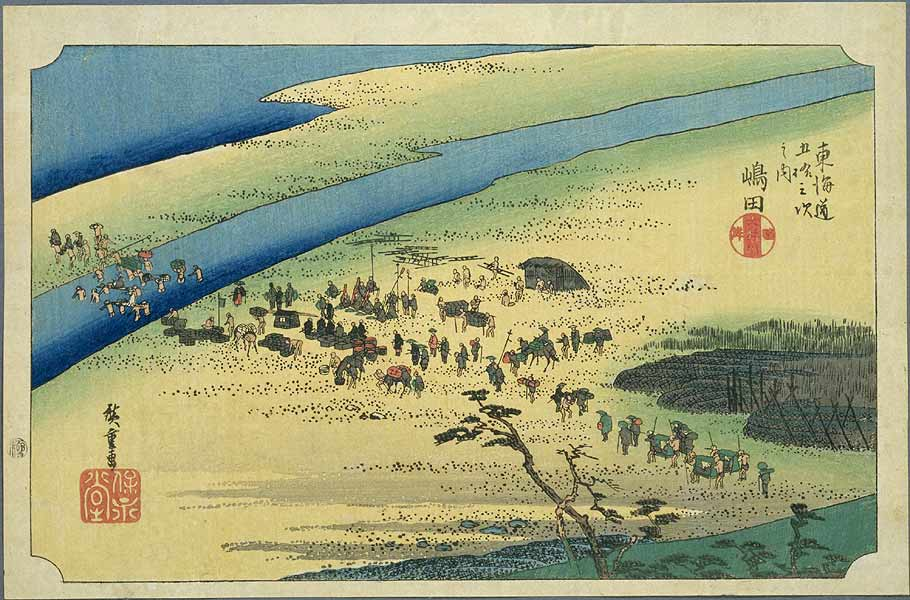
Shimada-juku in the 1830s, as depicted by Hiroshige in The Fifty-three Stations of the Tōkaidō

Shimada-juku (島田宿, Shimada-juku) was the twenty-third of the fifty-three stations of the Tōkaidō highway, which connected Edo with Kyoto in premodern Japan. It is located in what is now part of Shimada, Shizuoka Prefecture, Japan.

== History ==
Shimada-juku was located on the left bank (Edo side) of the Ōi River, just across from its neighboring post town, Kanaya-juku. As part of the outer defenses of the capital of Edo, the Tokugawa shogunate expressly forbid the construction of any bridge or ferry service over the Ōi River, forcing travelers to wade across its shallows. However, whenever the river flooded due to strong or long rains, crossing the river became nearly impossible. During periods of long rains, visitors were sometimes forced to stay at Shimada-juku for several days, increasing the amount of money they spent.

A common saying about Shimada-juku was "You can travel the 8 ri to Hakone, but to cross it, you must cross the uncrossable Ōi River" (箱根八里は馬でも越すが 越すに越されぬ大井川, Hakone hachiri wa uma demo kosu ga / kosu ni kosarenu Ōigawa).

The classic ukiyo-e print by Andō Hiroshige (Hōeidō edition) from 1831 to 1834 depicts travelers crossing the shallows and sand banks of the Ōi River. Some are on foot, some are carried by porters and others are riding in kago.

== National Historic Site ==
The site of the post town is located approximately two kilometers west of present-day Shimada Station on the JR East Tokaido Main Line. Initially, the river crossing was under the jurisdiction of the daikan of Shimada-juku, but in 1696 the post was separated, and the river crossing came under the jurisdiction of a separate office. The procedure to cross the river was to have travelers purchase a crossing permit at the magistrate's office, and then be carried across the river either on the backs of porters or by kago palanquin. The fee for crossing the river was determined daily by measuring the width and depth of the channel. The number of people making the crossing each day was estimated at 350 in the early Edo period, growing to more than 650 by the end of the Tokugawa Shogunate. A portion of the post town, including a number of late Edo-period buildings, has been preserved as a historic neighborhood. The magistrate's office has been relocated from its original site due to construction of the modern highway, but the structure itself is in good preservation. This building, along with the banyado where people gathered to make the crossing, and the fudaba, where the wooden river crossing tickets were sold and recovered, were designated a National Historic Site in 1966.

== Gallery ==
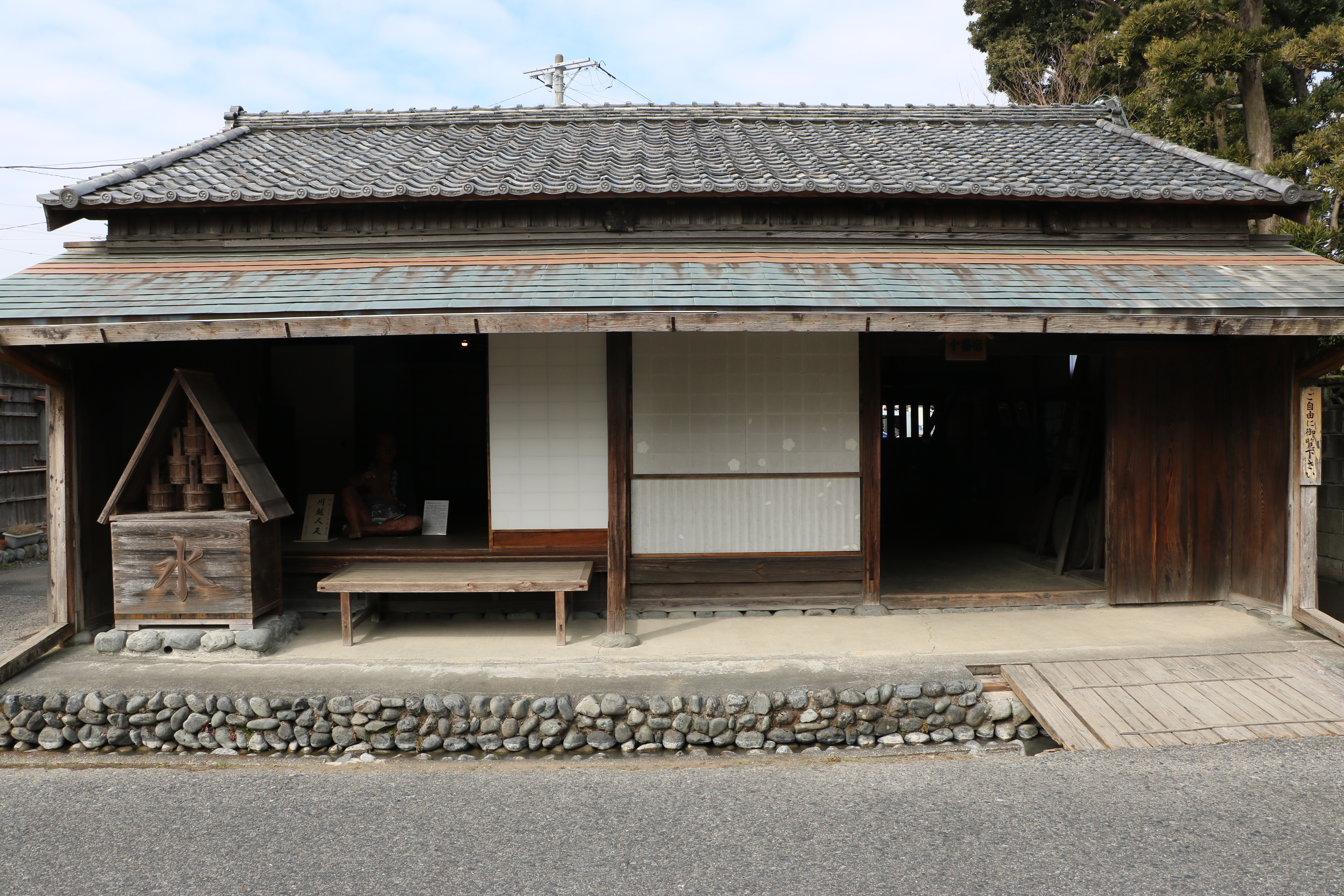
Banyado

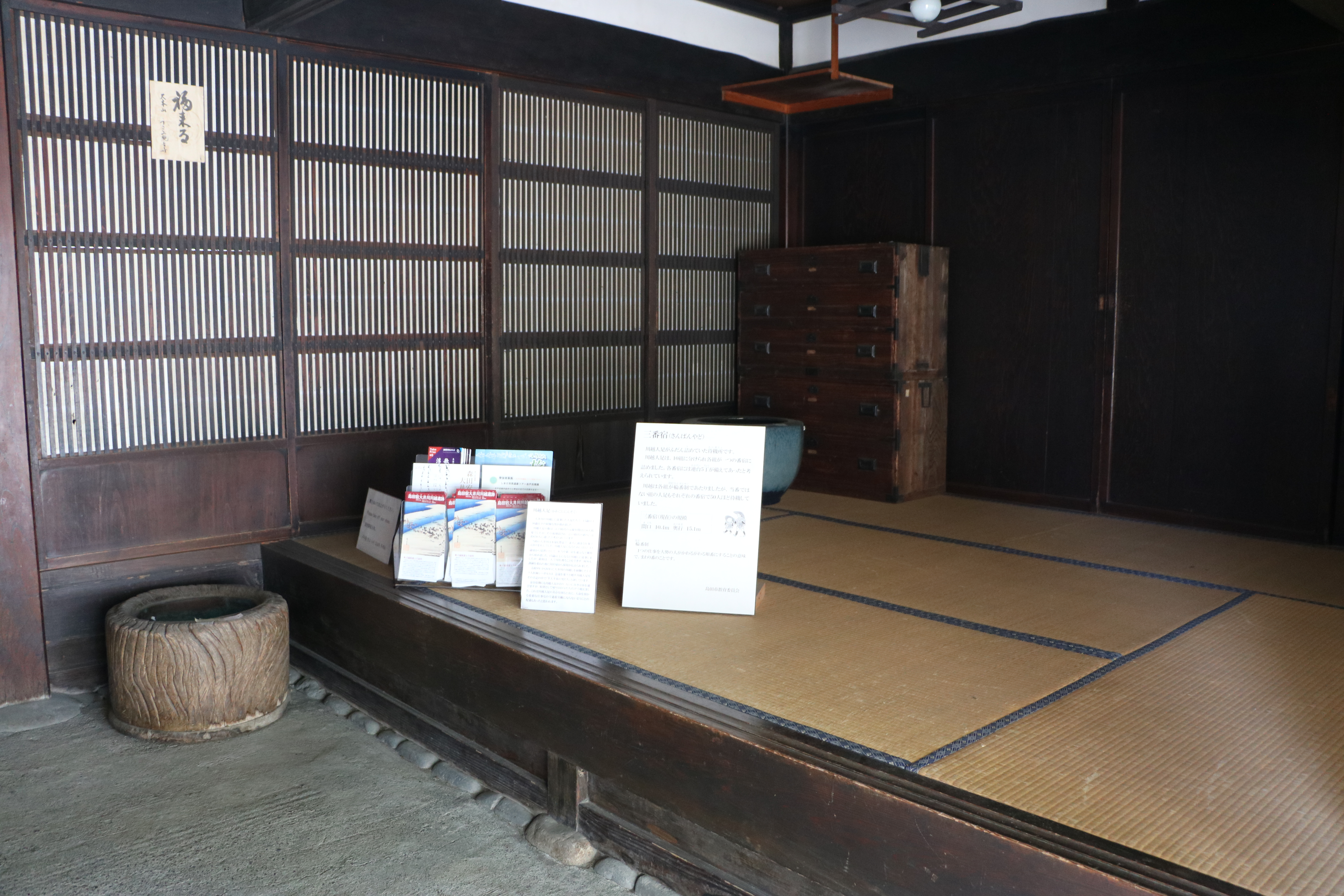
Banyado interior

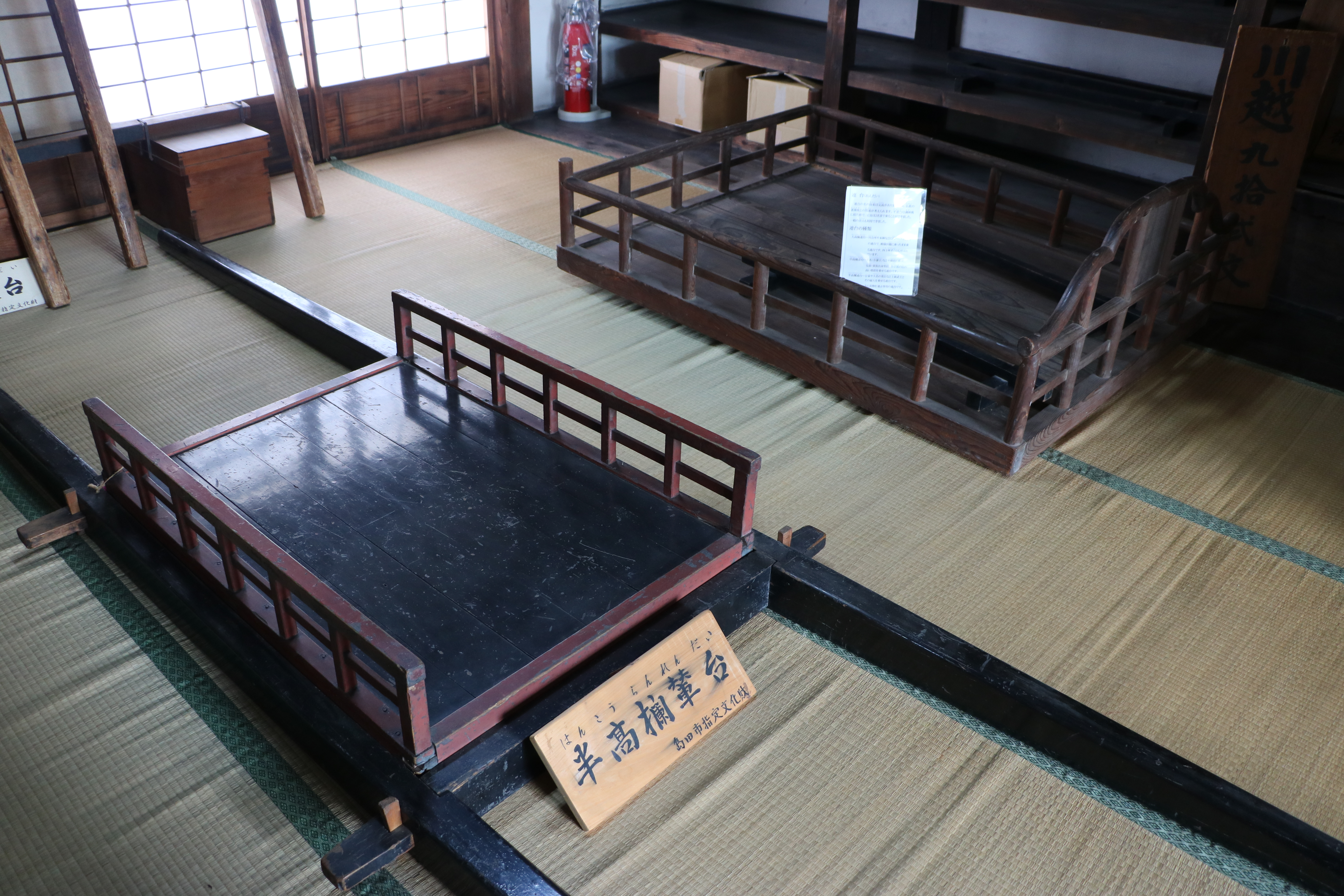
Shimada-juku planquin

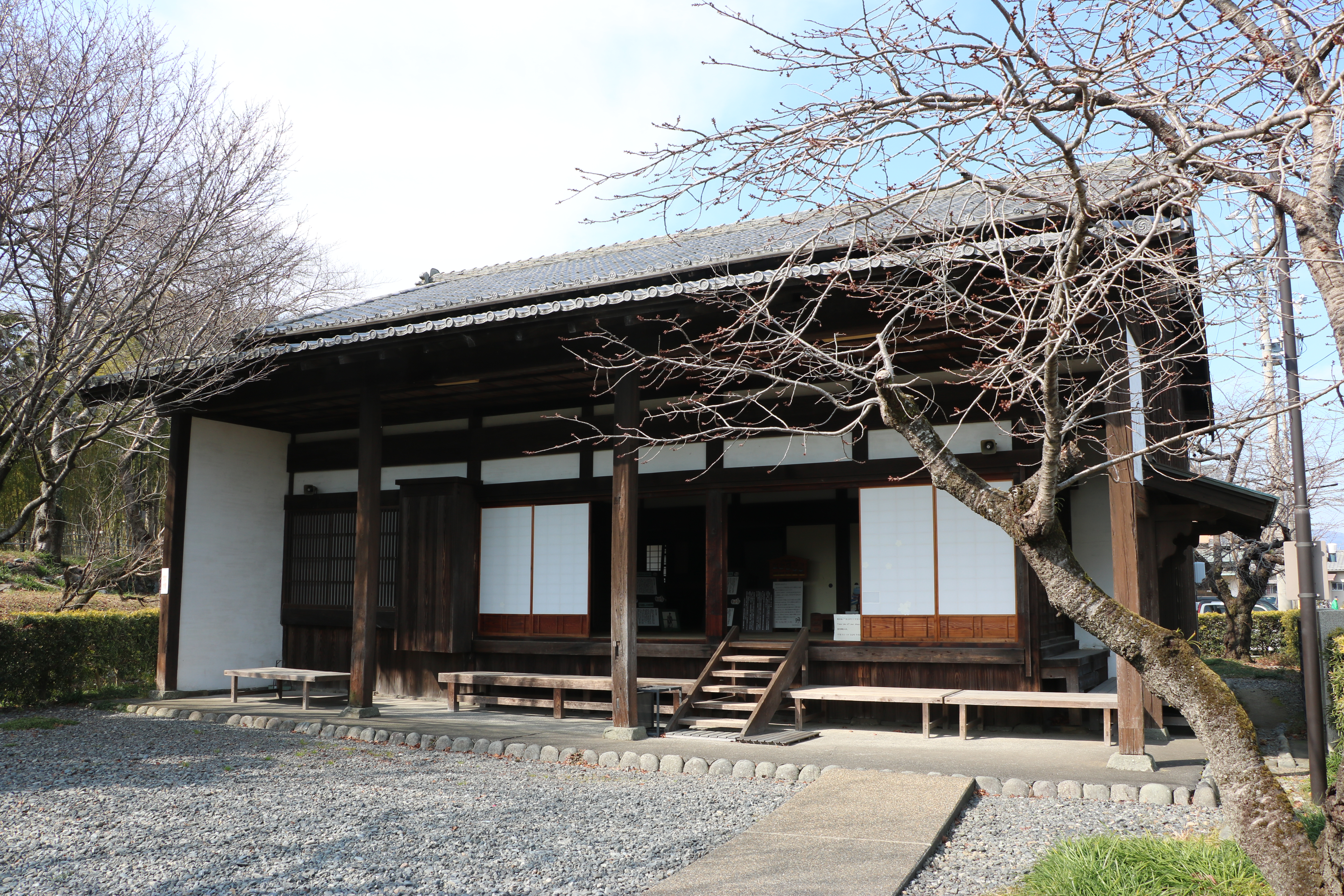
Magistrate's office

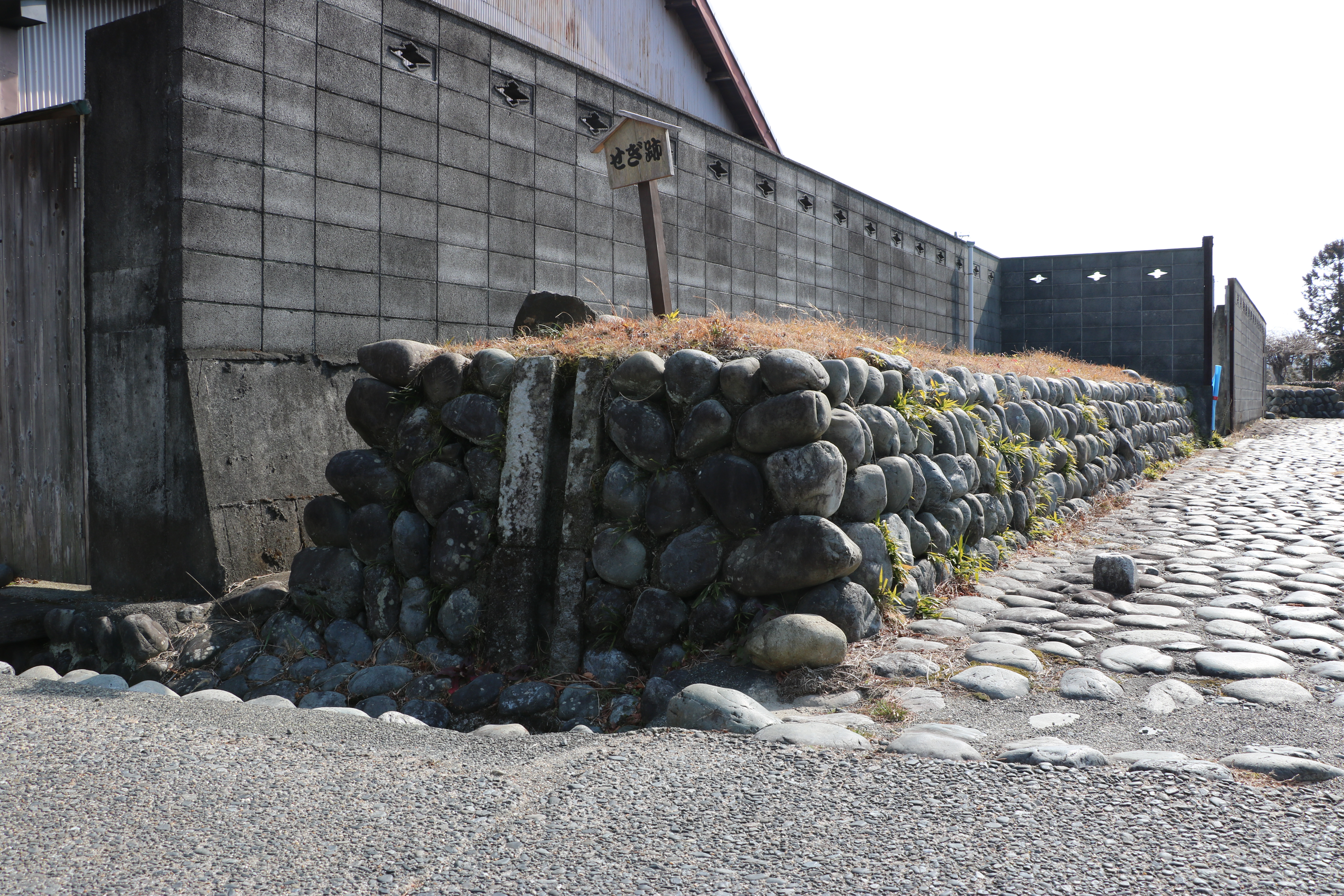
Ruins of weir

== Neighboring post towns ==
Tōkaidō
Fujieda-juku - Shimada-juku - Kanaya-juku
