= Maisaka-juku =

Thirtieth of the 53 stations of the Tōkaidō in Japan

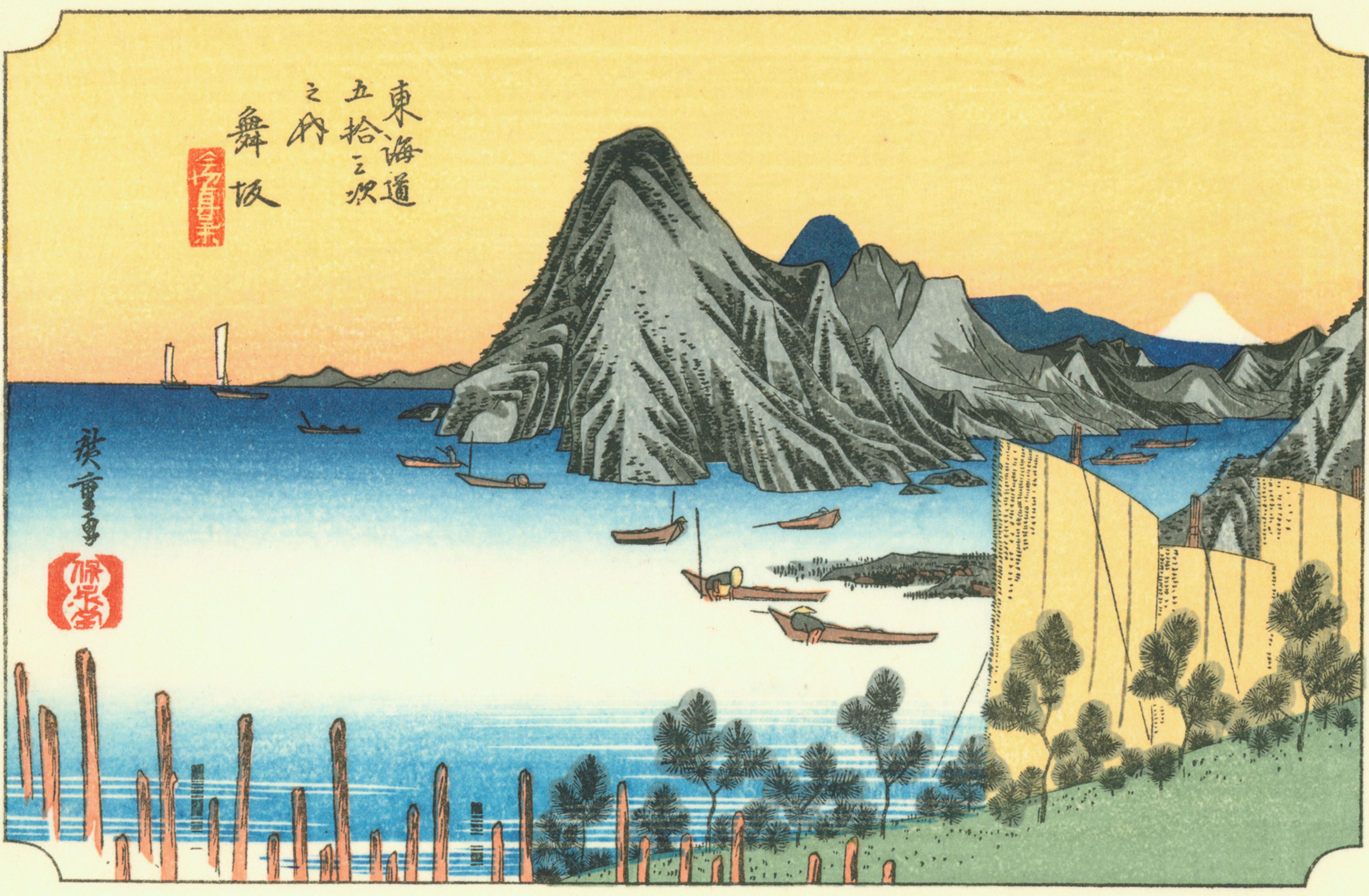
Maisaka-juku in the 1830s, as depicted by Hiroshige in The Fifty-three Stations of the Tōkaidō

Maisaka-juku (舞阪宿, Maisaka-juku) was the thirtieth of the fifty-three stations of the Tōkaidō. It is located in the western portion of Hamamatsu in Shizuoka Prefecture, Japan. During the Edo period, the area was part of Tōtōmi Province. The kanji for the post station were originally written 舞坂 (Maisaka).

== History ==
Maisaka-juku was located on the eastern shores of Lake Hamana (浜名湖, Hamana-ko). Travelers crossed the lake to reach Arai-juku, the next post station on the Tōkaidō. A pine colonnade from the Edo period remains today and stretches from Maisaka Station to the entrance for the post station.

Many visitors still come to the area, which is popular with fishermen and clam-diggers. However, none of the old streetscape remains today; only part of one old sub-honjin remains.

The classic ukiyo-e print by Andō Hiroshige (Hōeidō edition) from 1831 to 1834 depicts a small port, with Mount Fuji having become a very small landmark in the distance.

== Neighboring post towns ==
Tōkaidō
Hamamatsu-juku - Maisaka-juku - Arai-juku
