= Hara-juku (Tōkaidō) =

Thirteenth of the 53 stations of the Tōkaidō in Japan

Coordinates: 35°07′31″N 138°47′52″E

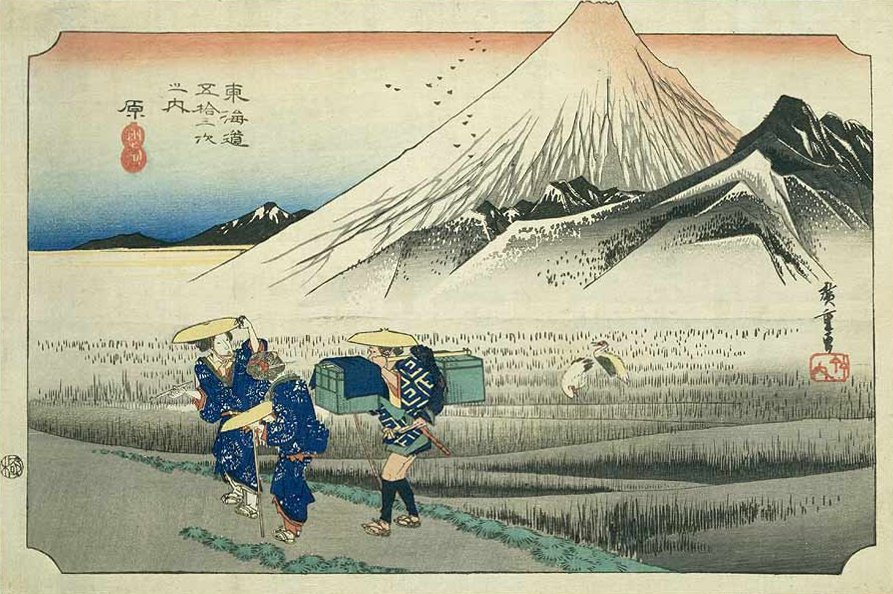
Hara-juku in the 1830s, as depicted by Hiroshige in the Hōeidō edition of The Fifty-three Stations of the Tōkaidō (1831–1834)

Hara-juku (原宿, Hara-juku) was the thirteenth of the fifty-three stations of the Tōkaidō. It is located in the present-day city of Numazu, Shizuoka Prefecture, Japan.

== History ==
Hara-juku was a smaller post town on the coast of Suruga Bay between Numazu-juku and Yoshiwara-juku in Suruga Province. It is the site of many paintings because of Mount Fuji in the background.

The classic ukiyo-e print by Andō Hiroshige (Hōeidō edition) from 1831 to 1834 depicts two women travelers walking past a huge snowy Mount Fuji. The women are accompanied by a manservant who is carrying their luggage. By contrast, the Kyōka edition of the late 1830s depicts three small teahouses, dwarfed by a huge, red Mount Fuji which protrudes out of the picture into the top margin.

== Neighboring post towns ==
Tōkaidō
Numazu-juku - Hara-juku - Yoshiwara-juku
