= Tashiro Dam =

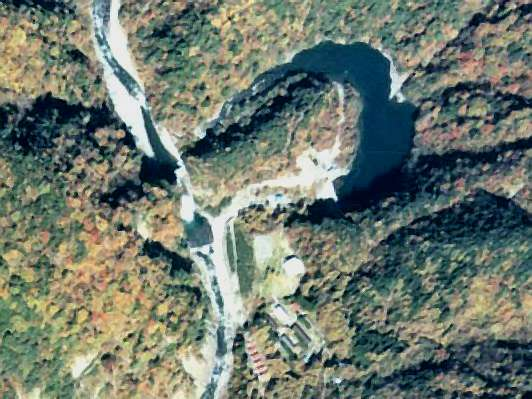
- Interactive map of Tashiro Dam
- Official name: 田代ダム
- Location: Shizuoka Prefecture, Japan
- Coordinates: 35°29′55″N 138°14′47″E
- Construction began: 1924
- Opening date: 1928
- Operator: Tokyo Electric

Dam and spillways
- Impounds: Ōi River
- Height: 17.3 meters
- Length: 108.5 meters

Reservoir
- Creates: Tashiro-chōseichi
- Total capacity: 220,000 m3
- Catchment area: 108 km2
- Surface area: 3 hectares

The Tashiro Dam (田代ダム, Tashiro damu) is a dam on the Ōi River in Aoi-ku, Shizuoka, Shizuoka Prefecture on the island of Honshū, Japan. It was the first concrete gravity dam to be constructed on the Ōi River, and has a hydroelectric power generating station owned by the Tokyo Electric Power Company.

== History ==
The potential of the Ōi River valley for hydroelectric power development was realized by the Meiji government at the start of the 20th century. The Ōi River was characterized by a high volume of flow and a fast current. Its mountainous upper reaches and tributaries were areas of steep valleys and abundant rainfall, and were sparsely populated.

In 1906, a joint venture company, the Anglo-Japanese Hydroelectric Company (日英水力電気, Nichiei Suiroku Denki) was established, and began studies and design work on plans to exploit the potential of the Ōi River and Fuji River in Shizuoka Prefecture. The British interests were bought out by 1921, and the company was renamed Hayakawa Electric (早川電力, Hayakawa Denryoku), for its plan to divert water from the Ōi River to the Hayakawa River in Yamanashi Prefecture through a system of penstocks, and thus generate electricity. Work on the Tashiro Dam began in 1924 and was completed in 1928.

Hayakawa Electric was absorbed into Tokyo Electric (東京電燈, Tokyo Dento), which was later nationalized and merged with other electrical producers into the Japan Electric Generation and Transmission Company (日本発送電株式会社, Nippon Hassoden K.K.). After the breakup of Nippon Hassoden at the end of World War II into various regional power utilities, the bulk of the dams on the Ōi River came under the control of Chubu Electric Power. However, only the Tashiro Dam was given to Tokyo Electric Power due to its previous owner, Tokyo Dento.

== Design ==
The Tashiro Dam was designed as a solid core, non-overflow concrete gravity dam. The impounded water forms a lake called the Tashiro-choseichi (田代調整池), from which water discharges through a long penstock under the Southern Japanese Alps into the Hayakawa River. Two hydroelectric power plants along this route produce 17,400 KW and 22,700 KW of power respectively.

== Surroundings ==
Tashiro Dam is located in the very northern tip of Shizuoka Prefecture, surrounded on three sides by the high peaks of the Minami Alps National Park, an area of high mountains, forests, and a popular vacation area. The dam is on a route for mountain climbers on the way to the Japanese Alps, and can be reached on foot. However, the dam itself and its associated electrical power plant are not open to the public, and access to the area by car is prohibited.
