= Ōi River =

River in Shizuoka Prefecture, Japan

Coordinates: 34°45′52″N 138°17′27″E

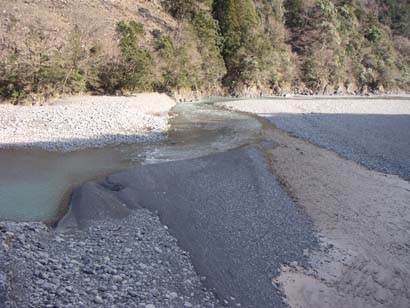
- Convergence of the upper Ōi and Sumata Rivers

- Location within Japan
- Native name: 大井川 (Japanese)

Physical characteristics
- Source
  - location: Mount Aino, Akaishi Mountains, Japan
  - elevation: 3,189 m (10,463 ft)
- Mouth
  - location: Suruga Bay
  - elevation: 0 m (0 ft)
- Length: 168 km (104 mi)
- Basin size: 1,280 km^{2} (490 sq mi)
- Discharge
  - average: 76.40 m^{3}/s (2,698 cu ft/s)

Basin features
- Bridges: Hōrai Bridge
- Dams: Tashiro Dam

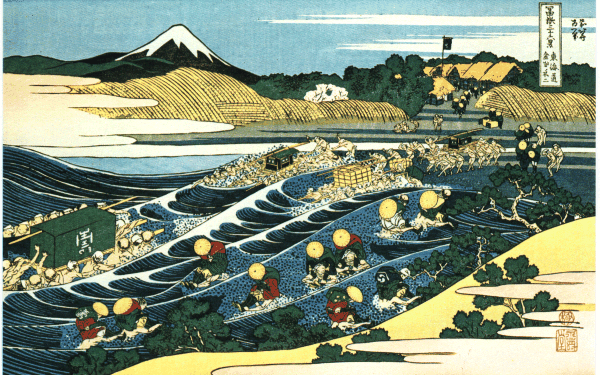
Travellers Crossing the Ōi River by Hokusai

The Ōi River (大井川, Ōi-gawa) is an A class river in Shizuoka Prefecture, Japan.

== Geography ==
The Ōi River flows from the Akaishi Mountains, the branch of the Japanese Southern Alps which form the border between Shizuoka, Nagano and Yamanashi prefectures. These mountains, with peaks ranging from 2,000 to 3,000 metres (6,600 to 9,800 ft), are characterized by heavy rainfall (up to 3,000 millimetres (120 in) per year) and deep V-shaped valleys. The river follows a generally southern course, with seven wide bends in its central region, before exiting into Suruga Bay in the Philippine Sea.

== History ==
The Ōi River is mentioned in Nara period records as forming the border between Tōtōmi and Suruga Provinces. However, due to shifting of the course of the river over the centuries, by the late Muromachi period, this was not always the case.

During the Edo period, the Tōkaidō developed as the major highway linking Edo with Kyoto, and daimyō from the western domains were forced to travel on a regular basis to Edo to attend to the shōgun in a system known as sankin-kōtai. However, the Tokugawa shogunate prohibited the building of bridges over major rivers as a security measure, and in the case of the Ōi River, even ferryboats were forbidden. As depicted in contemporary ukiyo-e prints by artists such as Hokusai, travelers crossed the river on bearers' shoulders or on horseback. In cases of bad weather or high waters, they were forced to stay several days (or even several weeks) beside the river at post stations such as Shimada-juku or Kanaya-juku.

Because of this, the Ōi River was regarded as the most difficult part of the Tōkaidō. A well-known lyric states:

箱根八里は馬でも越すが、越すに越されぬ大井川
Hakone hachiri wa uma demo kosu ga, kosu ni kosarenu Ōigawa
Even horses can cross eight ri (=31 km) of Hakone, but the Ōi River is hard to get over in any way.

The river was bridged shortly after the Meiji Restoration, notably by the Hōrai Bridge in 1879 (which was listed as the world's longest wooden pedestrian bridge by the Guinness Book of world records), and by other road and railroad bridges. Today the Tōkaidō Shinkansen express train crosses the river in a few seconds.

== Hydroelectric development ==
The potential of the Ōi River valley for hydroelectric power development was realized by the Meiji government at the start of the 20th century. The Ōi River was characterized by a high volume of flow and a fast current. Its mountainous upper reaches and tributaries were areas of steep valleys and abundant rainfall, and were sparsely populated.

In 1906, a joint venture company, the Anglo-Japanese Hydroelectric Company (日英水力電気, Nichiei Suiroku Denki) was established with private investors, and began studies and design work on plans to exploit the potential of both the Ōi River and Fuji River in Shizuoka Prefecture, and a small power station was built in 1911. However, the Kiso River and Tenryū River attracted more investment, and the company did not flourish. The British interests were bought out by 1921, and the company was renamed Hayakawa Electric (早川電力, Hayakawa Denryoku), for its plan to divert water from the Ōi River to the Hayakawa River in Yamanashi Prefecture through a system of penstocks, and thus generate electricity. Work on the Tashiro Dam began in 1924 and was completed in 1928. Hayakawa Electric became a subsidiary of Tokyo Electric in 1925 and was renamed Ōigawa Electric before becoming nationalized and merged with other electrical producers into the Japan Electric Generation and Transmission Company (日本発送電株式会社, Nippon Hassoden K.K.) in 1938. During the early 1930s, Ōigawa Electric had completed a number of dams on tributary branches of the Ōi River, but work was stalled by the Great Depression, and came to a halt during World War II.

After the end of World War II, the American occupation authorities ordered the dissolution of Nippon Hassoden, which was divided into regional power companies. Central Japan came under Chubu Electric Power, which inherited the various dams and projects on the Ōi River (with the exception of Tashiro Dam). In part through foreign aid loans from the United Nations, Chubu Electric pioneered the use of new dam technologies, such as the hollow-core concrete gravity dam concept at the Ōi River, and completed a number of large dams in the 1950s and early 1960s. These dams have altered the once abundant flow of the river, and the lower reaches of the river near its mouth are almost dry.

== Tourism ==
The Ōigawa Railway runs two lines in the Ōi River valley. Originally built to facilitate dam construction, both lines are now primarily run for tourists, and include a popular steam locomotive run into the mountains.

== See also ==
- Japanese cruiser Ōi
