= Tomida Ichirizuka =

Historic Site of Japan in Aichi Prefecture

Tomida ichirizuka
- 富田一里塚 (Japanese)
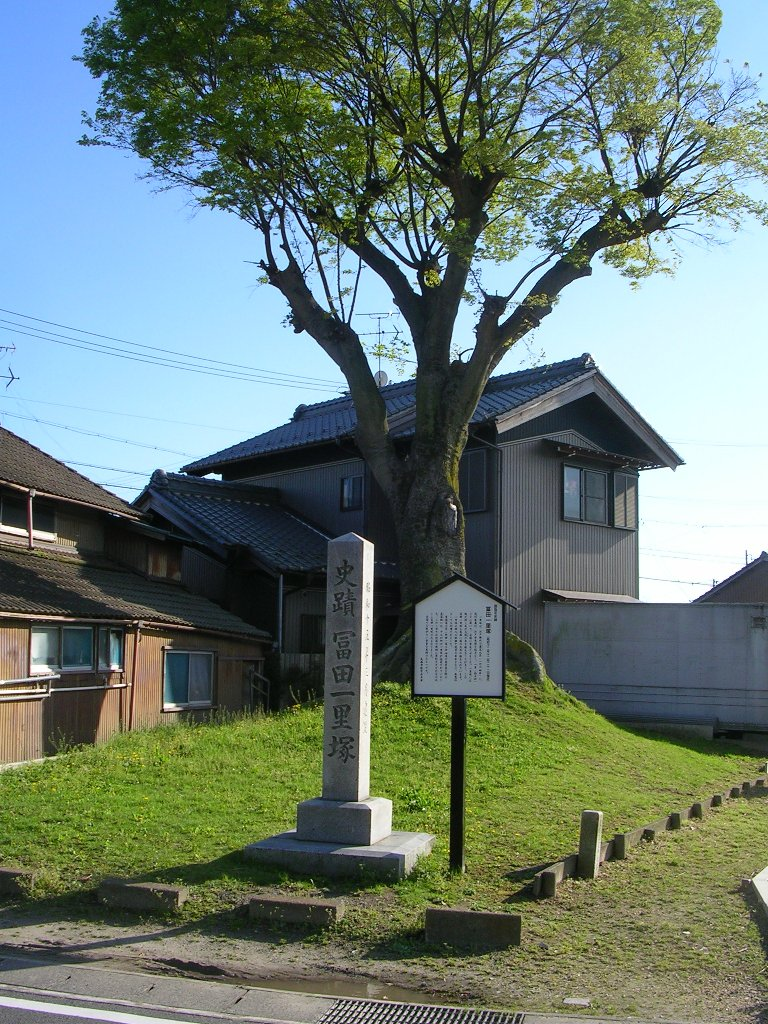
- Tomida ichirizuka

- Tomida ichirizuka Tomida Ichirizuka (Japan)
- 35°17′45″N 136°44′30″E
- Periods: Edo period
- Location: Ichinomiya, Aichi, Japan
- Region: Tōkai region

Site notes
- Public access: Yes

The Tomida ichirizuka (富田一里塚) is a pair of Japanese distance markers akin to a milestone, consisting of two earthen mounds flanking the route of the old Tōkaidō highway located in what is now part of the city of Ichinomiya, Aichi Prefecture in the Tōkai region of Japan. It was designated a National Historic Site of Japan in 1937.

== Overview ==
During the Edo period Tokugawa shogunate established ichirizuka on major roads, enabling calculation both of distance travelled and of the charge for transportation by kago or palanquin. These mounds, denoted the distance in ri (3.927 kilometres (2.440 mi)) to Nihonbashi, the "Bridge of Japan", erected in Edo in 1603. They were typically planted with an enoki or Japanese red pine to provide shelter for travelers. Since the Meiji period, most of the ichirizuka have disappeared, having been destroyed by the elements, modern highway construction and urban encroachment. In 1876, the "Ichirizuka Abolition decree" was issued by the Meiji government and many were demolished at that time. Currently, 17 surviving ichirizuka are designated as national historic sites.

In the case of the Tomida ichirizuka, the mounds flank the Minoji, a 60 km (37 mi) a secondary route, ranked below the Edo Five Routes in importance, which connected Miya-juku on the Tōkaidō with Tarui-juku on the Nakasendō. This ichirizuka is the only one of thirteen which once existed on this route where both of the pair of mounds have survived. Both mounds are 1.8 meters in height and 9.2 meters in diameter, and planted with enoki trees.

The site is 15 minutes on foot from Meitetsu-Ichinomiya Station on the Meitetsu Nagoya Main Line.

== See also ==
- List of Historic Sites of Japan (Aichi)
