= Yokkaichi-juku =

Forty-third of the 53 stations of the Tōkaidō

Yokkaichi-juku 四日市宿
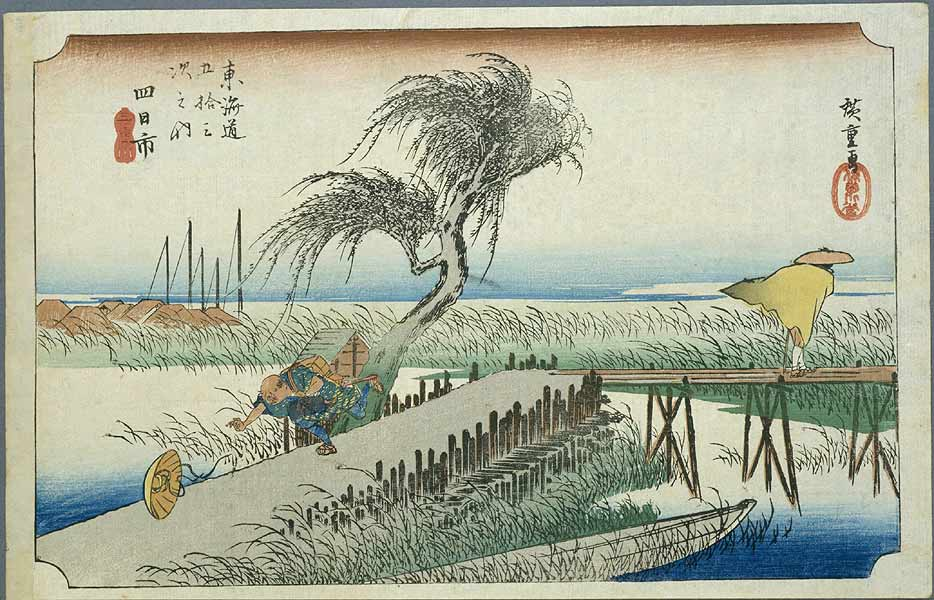
- Hiroshige's print of Yokkaichi-juku, part of the Hōeidō edition The Fifty-three Stations of the Tōkaidō series

General information
- Location: Yokkaichi, Mie (former Ise Province); Japan
- Coordinates: 34°58′11.81″N 136°37′33.1″E
- Elevation: 7 m (23 ft)
- System: post station
- Line: Tōkaidō
- Distance: 389.6 km from Edo
Location
- Location within Mie Prefecture Location within Japan

Yokkaichi-juku (四日市宿, Yokkaichi-juku) was the forty-third of the fifty-three stations (shukuba) of the Tōkaidō, which connected Edo with Kyoto in the Edo period of Japan. It was located in the former Ise Province in what is now part of the city of Yokkaichi, Mie Prefecture, Japan.

== History ==
Yokkaichi-juku was a post town located at the intersection of the Tōkaidō and the Ise Sangū Kaidō, one of the main highways for pilgrims to the Ise Grand Shrines, and it developed as a market town from the Muromachi period, noted for holding a market on days ending in "four" of each month. The earliest recorded market dates back to 1470. Under the Tokugawa shogunate, Yokkaichi was tenryō territory under direct control of the Shōgun, and was administered by a daikan based in the town. It was also possible for travelers to take a ferry from here to Miya-juku, thus bypassing Kuwana-juku.

Per the 1843 "東海道宿村大概帳" (Tōkaidō Shukuson Taigaichō) guidebook issued by the Inspector of Highways (道中奉行, Dōchu-būgyō), the town had a population of 7114 in 1811 houses, including two honjin, one wakihonjin, and 98 hatago. It had one Tonyaba, for the stabling of packhorses and warehousing of goods, and one kōsatsu for the display of official notifications. A local product of Yokkaichi-juku favored by traveller was Nagamochi (なが餅), an elongated rice cape containing a paste made from sweet red beans, which had been roasted over charcoal. The name was play on words, indicating that the confectionery "kept for a long time" and also "kept one fun for a long time".

Yokkaichi-juku was 12.8 km from Kuwana-juku, the preceding post town and 389.6 kilometers from Edo.

== Yokkaichi-juku in The Fifty-three Stations of the Tōkaidō ==
Utagawa Hiroshige's ukiyo-e Hōeidō edition print of Yokkaichi-juku dates from 1833 -1834. The print illustrates a windy day with a man racing after his hat, which has been blown away by the wind and another man crosses a small bridge over the Sanju River, depicted here as a small stream. The post town is depicted as a small collection of huts in the middle of a marsh, almost hidden by the reeds.

== Neighboring Post Towns ==
Tōkaidō
Kuwana-juku - Yokkaichi-juku - Ishiyakushi-juku
