= Ishiyakushi-juku =

Forty-fourth of the 53 stations of the Tōkaidō

Ishiyakushi-juku 石薬師宿
- Hiroshige's print of Ishiyakushi-juku, part of the Hōeidō edition The Fifty-three Stations of the Tōkaidō series

General information
- Location: Suzuka, Mie (former Ise Province); Japan
- Coordinates: 34°54′14.34″N 136°32′52.22″E
- Elevation: 47 m (154 ft)
- System: post station
- Line: Tōkaidō
- Distance: 398.2 km from Edo
Location
- Location within Mie Prefecture Location within Japan

Ishiyakushi-juku (石薬師宿, Ishiyakushi-juku) was the forty-fourth of the fifty-three stations (shukuba) of the Tōkaidō connecting Edo with Kyoto in Edo period Japan. It was located in former Ise Province in what is now part of the city of Suzuka, Mie Prefecture, Japan.

== History ==
Ishiyakushi-juku was established in 1616, as part of the Edo period's Tōkaidō. Originally, there had been no post stations between Yokkaichi-juku and Kameyama-juku, so Ishiyakushi-juku was formed with about 180 buildings at its inception. The Ozawa family managed the honjin in the town and kept many records, which are still available today in a local archives museum.

The post station received its name from the nearby Buddhist temple of Ishiyakushi-ji, which claims to have been founded in 726 AD by the shugendō monk Taichō. According to the temple legend, Kūkai carved an image of Yakushi Nyorai on a huge boulder that was found in the forest, and Taichō later built a temple around this image. A settlement gradually developed around the temple.

Per the 1843 "東海道宿村大概帳" (Tōkaidō Shukuson Taigaichō) guidebook issued by the Inspector of Highways (道中奉行, Dōchu-būgyō), the town had a population of 991 in 180 houses, with three honjin, and 15 hatago, indicating the small scale of the settlement. Of the 180 household, 130 were classified as "farmers". As it had to compete with nearby Shōno-juku, the post town never grew. It was 398.2 kilometers from Edo.

Near the site of the honjin is the preserved house of Nobutsuna Sasaki, a famous tanka poet and scholar who was born in 1872.

== Ishiyakushi-juku in The Fifty-three Stations of the Tōkaidō ==
Utagawa Hiroshige's ukiyo-e Hōeidō edition print of Ishiyakushi-juku dates from 1833 -1834. The print does depicts the temple in a grove of trees on the left and a village on the right, with the Suzuka Mountains in the background. Bales of rice indicate that the setting is autumn, and reflect the rural character of the post town, and the closed temple gate indicate that the time is dusk.

== Neighboring Post Towns ==
Tōkaidō
Yokkaichi-juku – Ishiyakushi-juku – Shōno-juku
