= Narumi-juku =

Fortieth of the 53 stations of the Tōkaidō

Coordinates: 35.066620°N 136.970924°E

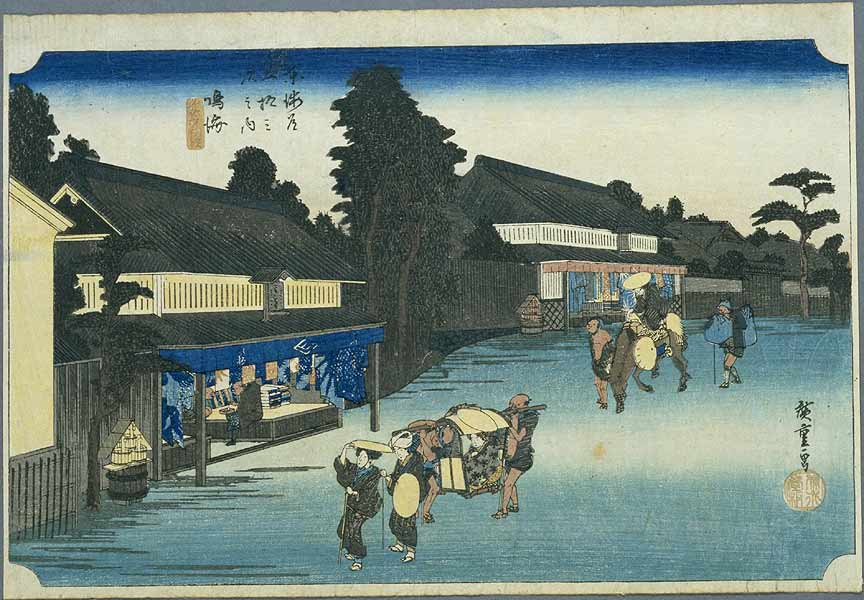
Narumi-juku in the 1830s, as depicted by Hiroshige in as depicted by Hiroshige in the Hōeidō edition of The Fifty-three Stations of the Tōkaidō (1831-1834)

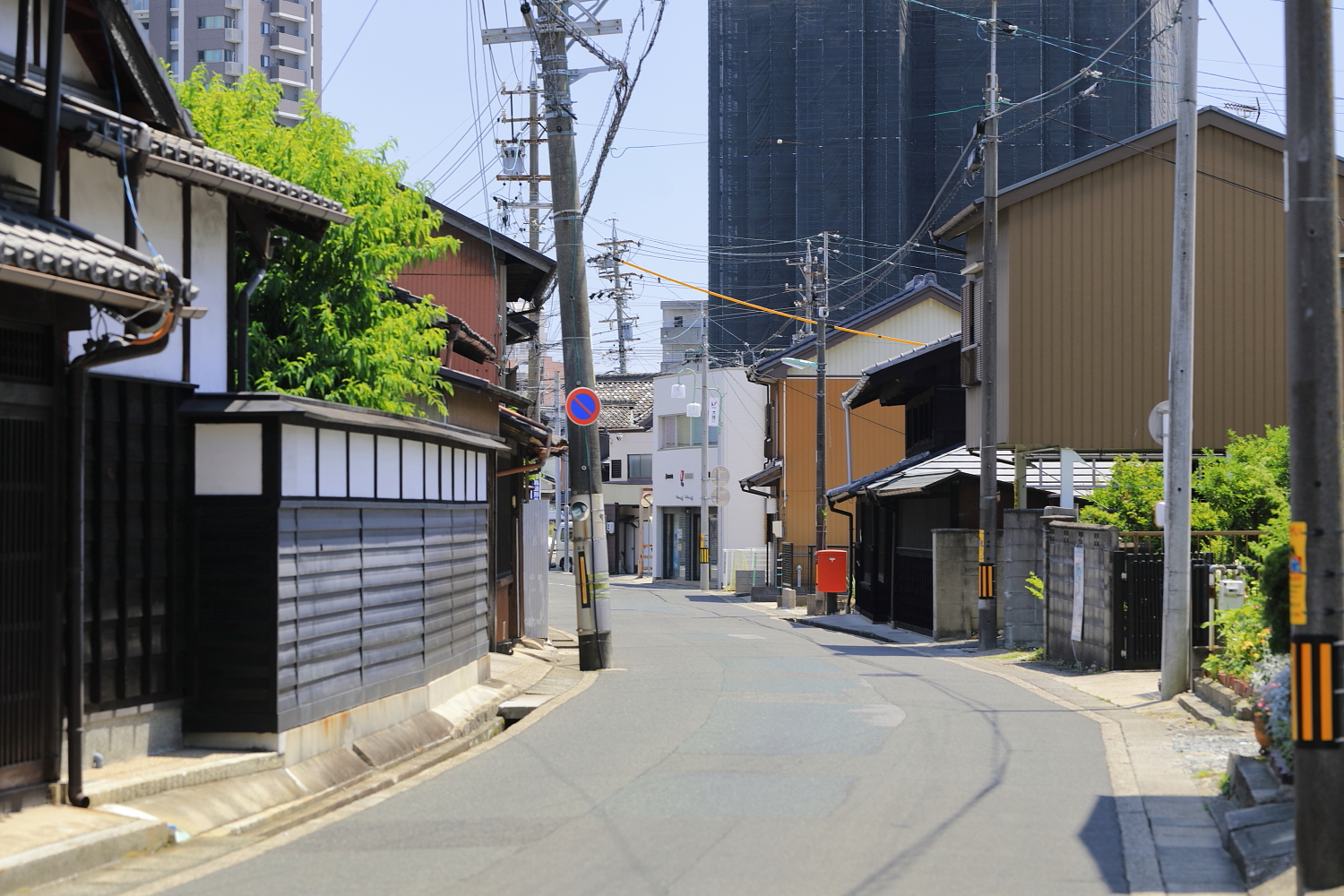
Present-day Narumi-juku

Narumi-juku (鳴海宿, Narumi-juku) was the fortieth of the fifty-three stations of the Tōkaidō. It is located in former Owari Province in what is now part of the Midori-ku section of the city of Nagoya, in Aichi Prefecture, Japan.

== History ==
Narumi-juku had a population of 3,643 people at its peak. The post station also had 847 buildings, including one honjin, two wakihonjin and 68 hatago.

The classic ukiyo-e print by Andō Hiroshige (Hōeidō edition) from 1831 to 1834 depicts travellers passing by open-fronted shops selling tie-died cloth, typically used for making yukata summer kimono, which was a local speciality of the region. The railroad bypassed Narumi-juku in the Meiji period, and a portion of the old town is preserved as a tourist attraction.

== Neighboring post towns ==
Tōkaidō
Chiryū-juku - Narumi-juku - Miya-juku
