= Inaba-juku =

Inaba-juku (稲葉宿, Inaba-juku) was the fourth of the nine post stations of the Minoji. It is located in the city of Inazawa, Aichi Prefecture, Japan. Oda Nobukatsu, lord of Kiyosu Castle, built this post station prior to the Battle of Komaki and Nagakute.

== History ==
Originally, the post station was a lodging station serving two villages – "Inaba" (稲葉村 Inaba-mura) and the neighboring village of Kosawa (小沢村 Kosawa-mura). The two villages merged and combined their characters to form the city of Inazawa (稲沢).

There are only stone markers at the location of the former honjin and toiya, but many old buildings from the time period remain.

== Neighboring post towns ==
Minoji
Kiyosu-juku - Inaba-juku - Hagiwara-juku
