= Sekigahara (disambiguation) =

Sekigahara (関ヶ原) is a town in Gifu Prefecture, Japan.

Sekigahara may also refer to:

- Sekigahara Station, a railway station
- Sekigahara Campaign, a series of battles in Japan in 1600
  - Battle of Sekigahara, a October 21, 1600, battle during the Sekigahara Campaign
- Sekigahara-juku, a historical rest area of the Nakasendō, located in the town
- Sekigahara (film), a 2017 Japanese film
