= Shōno-juku =

Forty-fifth of the 53 stations of the Tōkaidō

Shōno-juku 庄野宿
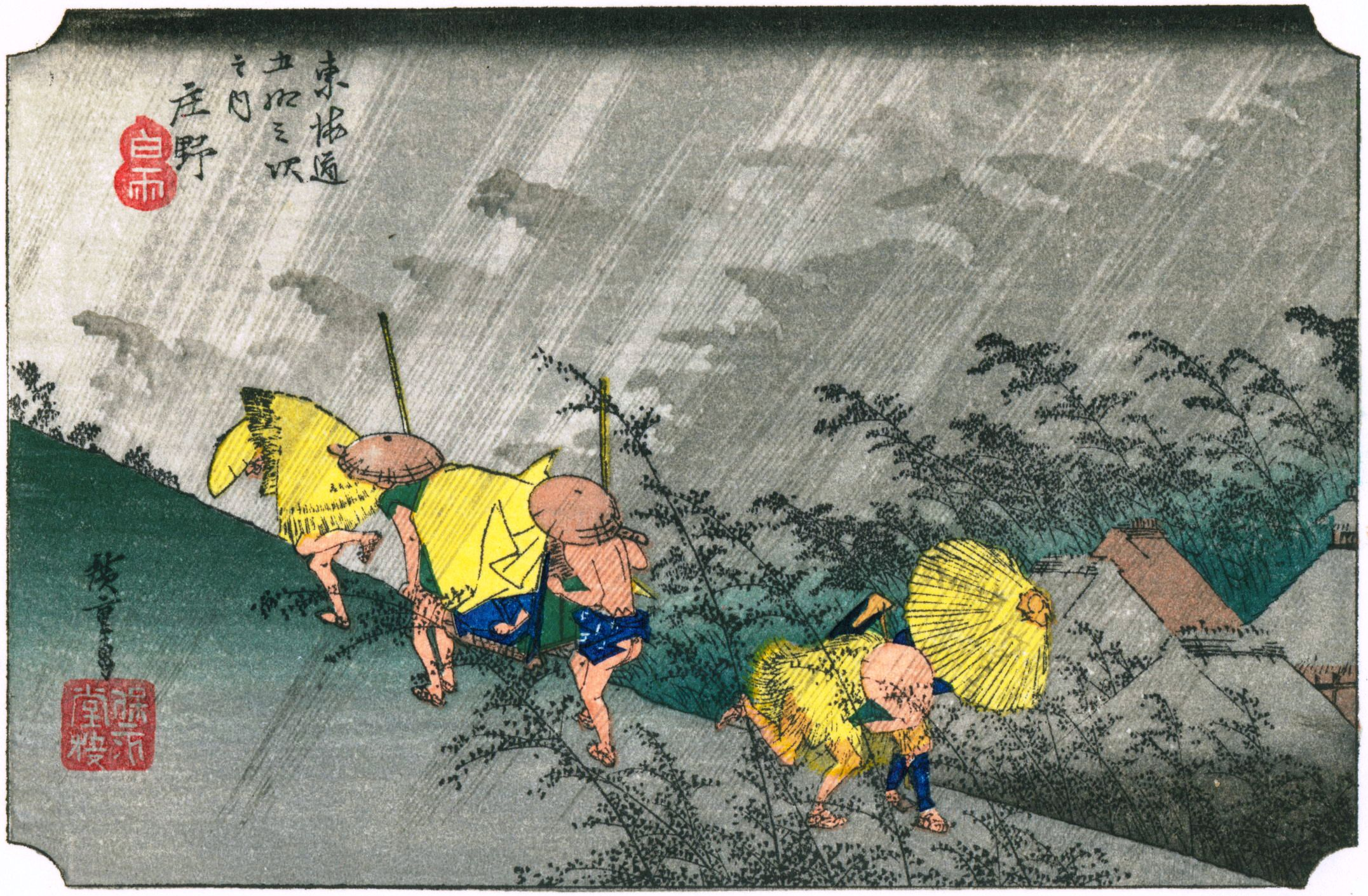
- Hiroshige's print of Shōno-juku, part of the Hōeidō edition The Fifty-three Stations of the Tōkaidō series

General information
- Location: Kameyama, Mie (former Ise Province); Japan
- Coordinates: 34°53′03.81″N 136°31′33.28″E
- Elevation: 23 m (75 ft)
- System: post station
- Line: Tōkaidō
- Distance: 400.9 km from Edo
Location
- Location within Mie Prefecture Location within Japan

Shōno-juku (庄野宿, Shōno-juku) was the forty-fifth of the fifty-three stations (shukuba) of the Tōkaidō connecting Edo with Kyoto in Edo period Japan. It was located in former Ise Province in what is now the city of Suzuka, Mie Prefecture, Japan.

== History ==
Shōno-juku was established in 1624 and was thus the last post station to be established on the Tōkaidō. The reason for its establishment is unclear, but it was built at a pre-existing settlement. The scale of the post station was small, and the number of visitors staying was few, leading the shogunate in 1815 to halve the number of people authorized to man the two official honjin.

Per the 1843 "東海道宿村大概帳" (Tōkaidō Shukuson Taigaichō) guidebook issued by the Inspector of Highways (道中奉行, Dōchu-būgyō), the town had a population of 855 with one honjin, one wakihonjin, and 15 hatago. It had one Tonyaba, for the stabling of packhorses and warehousing of goods, and one kōsatsu for the display of official notifications. It was 400.9 kilometers from Edo. The distance between neighboring Ishiyakushi-juku and Shōno-juku was less than three kilometers, making it the second shortest interval between stations on the Tōkaidō.

Shōno-juku established an archives museum in 1998 in one of the surviving buildings of the post station. It contains information on Shōno-juku's honjin, other buildings and aspects of daily life, such as folk tools, farm tools, and daily necessities. The building is not a restored honjin as stated in some guidebooks, but is the restored residence of local artist Hikosaburo Kobayashi, and the building also displays paintings and documents related to his life.

== Shōno-juku in The Fifty-three Stations of the Tōkaidō ==
Utagawa Hiroshige's ukiyo-e Hōeidō edition print of Shōno-juku dates from 1833 -1834. It is titled Shōno's White Rain (白雨, Haku'u). and depicts a group of travelers with straw raincoats and umbrellas, caught in a sudden summer thunderstorm and hurrying towards shelter. Kago (palanquin) bearers with a seated passenger are struggling up the slope, and a farmer with a straw raincoat and a traveler with an umbrella are struggling down the slope in the opposite direction. The thatched roofs of the post station are depicted in the lower right corner of the composition.

== Neighboring post towns ==
Tōkaidō
Ishiyakushi-juku - Shōno-juku - Kameyama-juku
