= Nagoya-juku =

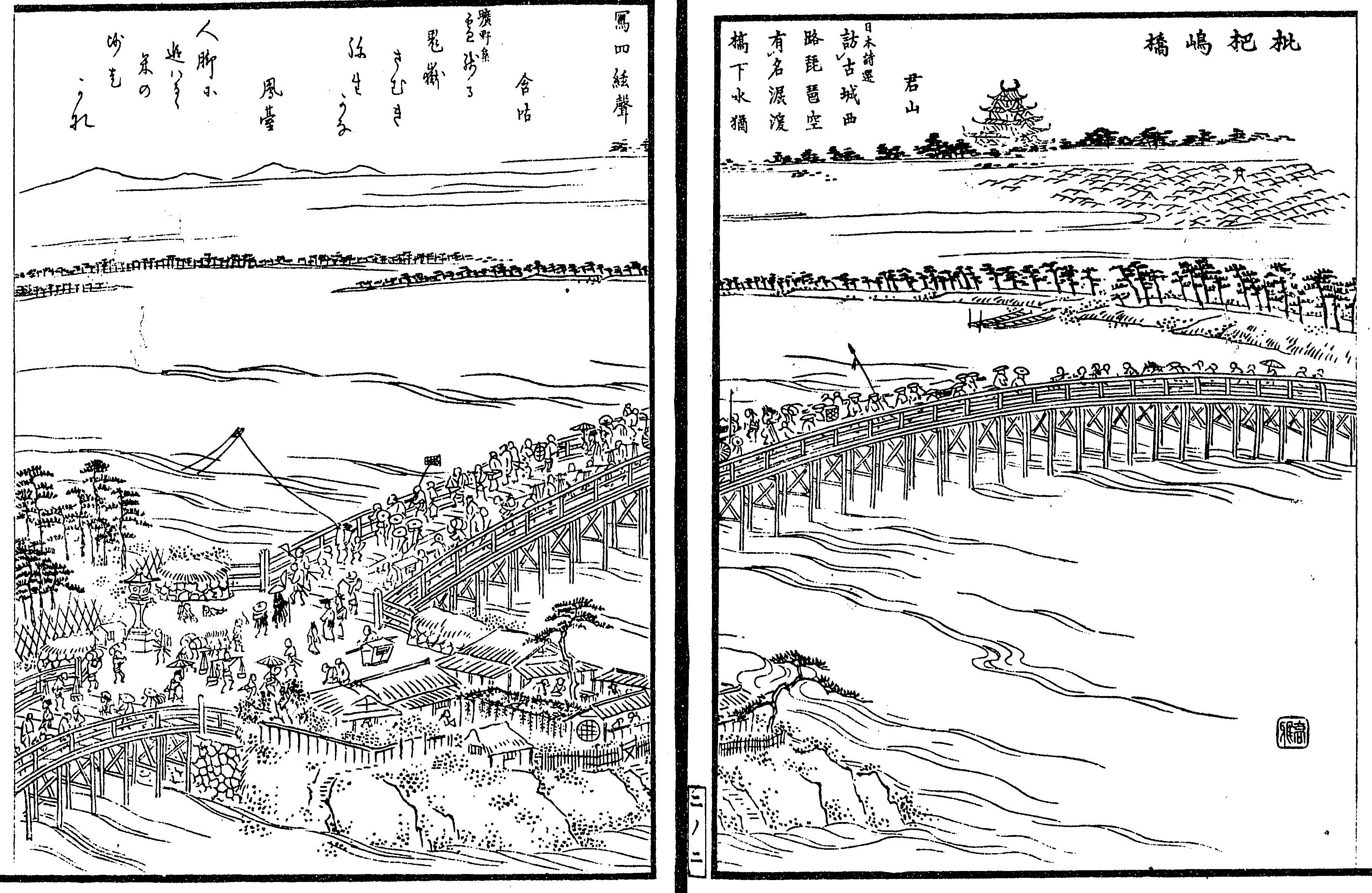
Depiction of the Biwajima Bashi with Nagoya Castle in the background] (from the Owari meisho zue)

Nagoya-juku (名古屋宿, Nagoya-juku) was the second of the nine post stations of the Minoji. It is located in the Naka-ku section of the city of Nagoya, in Aichi Prefecture, Japan.

== History ==
Nagoya-juku was established as a castle town for nearby Nagoya Castle by the Owari Domain in 1613, but it had neither honjin nor sub-honjin at that time. Because it was located on the Minoji, it was connected to both the Nakasendō and the Tōkaidō, both of which were important trade routes at the time.

== Neighboring post towns ==
Minoji
Miya-juku - Nagoya-juku - Kiyosu-juku
