= Kiyosu-juku =

Minoji post station on Honshu, Japan

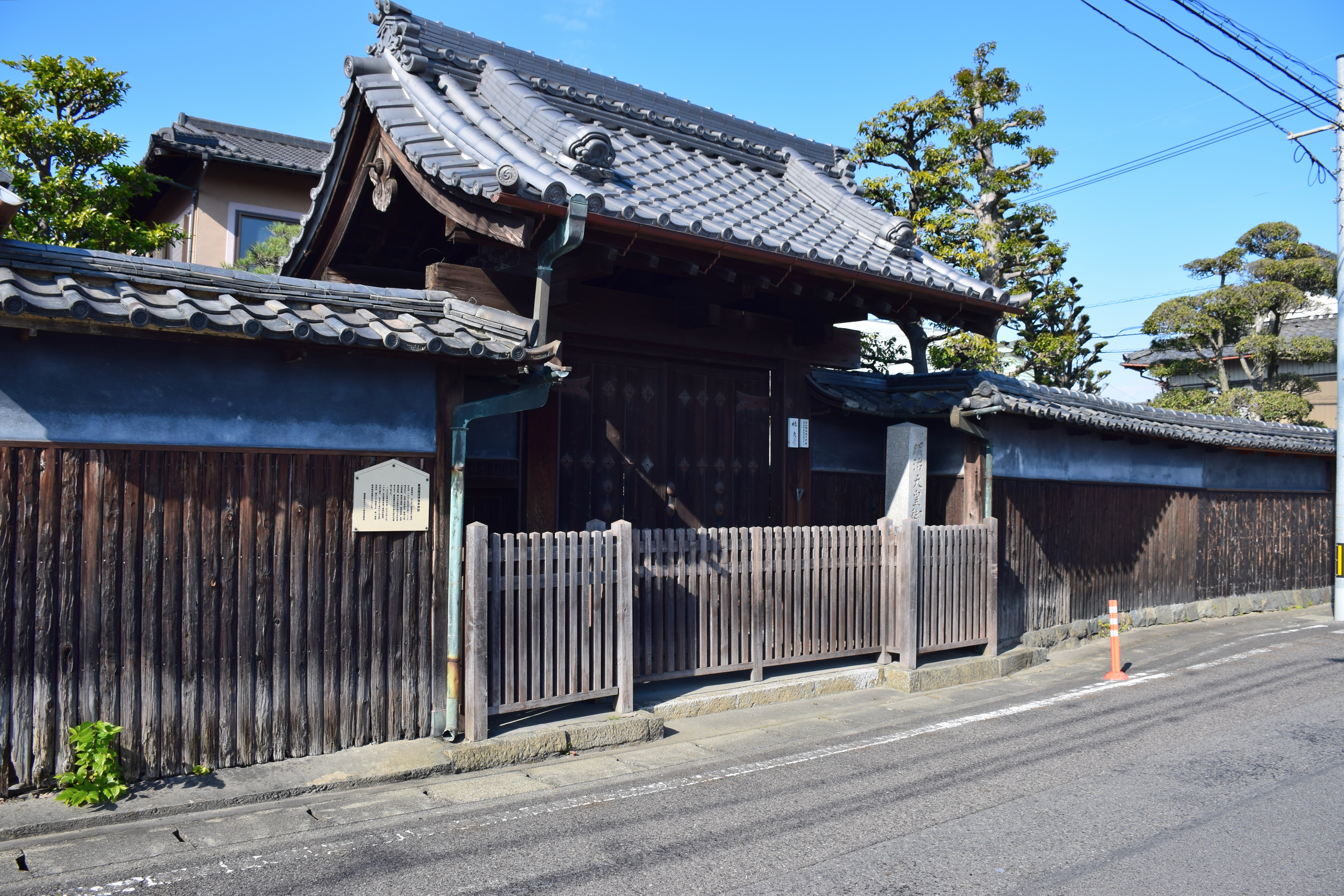
Remains of Kiyosu-juku's honjin

Kiyosu-juku (清須宿, Kiyosu-juku) was the third of nine post stations of the Minoji. It is located in the city of Kiyosu, Aichi Prefecture, Japan.

== History ==
Kiyosu-juku was originally formed as a castle town for Kiyosu Castle; however, the original town was decimated when much of the populace was moved to Nagoya Castle. Kiyosu-juku was established in 1602, after the Minoji was established to connect the Nakasendō and the Tōkaidō. Though the post station and the castle share the same name, different kanji were used to write the name: 清洲 was used for the castle, while 清須 was used for the post station.

Ruins of the post town's honjin can still be found today, just south of Kiyosu Park. The Meiji emperor stayed in the honjin while traveling during his reign.

== Neighboring post towns ==
Minoji
Nagoya-juku - Kiyosu-juku - Inaba-juku
