= Sunomata-juku =

Seventh of nine post stations

Sunomata-juku (墨俣宿, Sunomata-juku) was the seventh of nine post stations along the Minoji. It is located in the present-day city of Ōgaki, Gifu Prefecture, Japan. In addition to serving as a post station, it was also a castle town for Sunomata Castle. Sandwiched between the Nagara and Ibi rivers, it was an active post station.

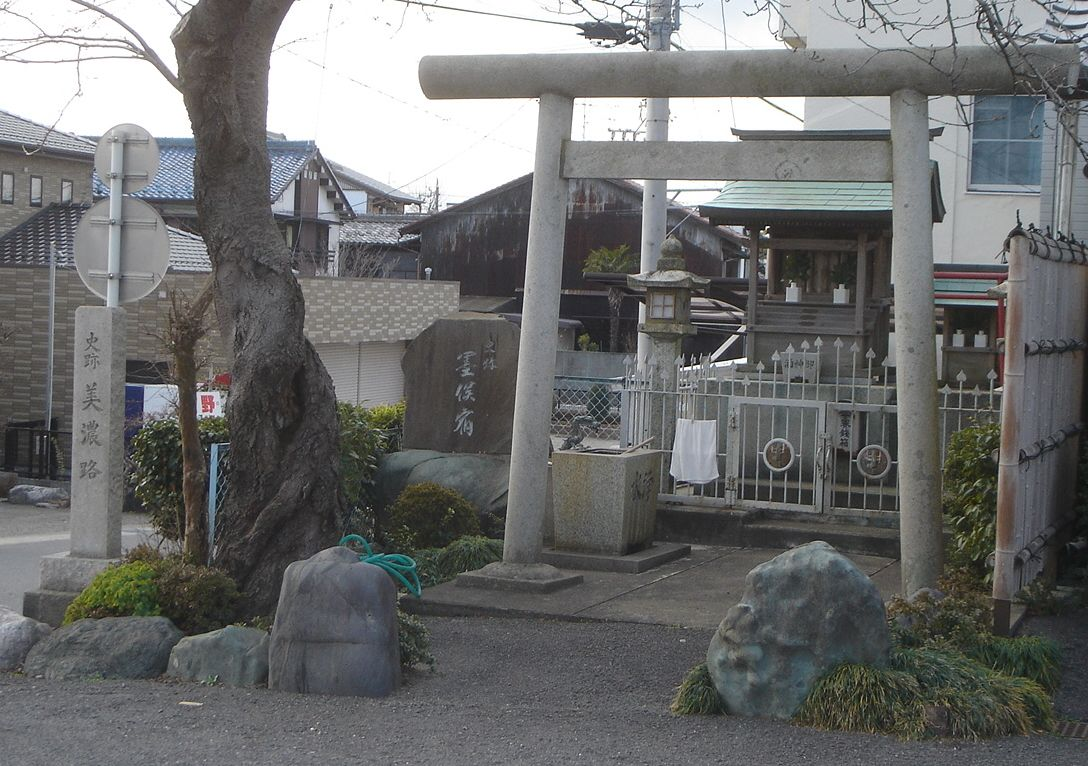
Picture of Sunomata-juku

== History ==
The area flourished as a post station even before the establishment of the Minoji. During the Muromachi period, the town was a stop on the Kamakura Kaidō, which connected Kyoto with Kamakura. Ruins of the honjin and sub-honjin can still be seen in the city.

== Neighboring post towns ==
Minoji
Okoshi-juku - Sunomata-juku - Ōgaki-juku
