= Kuwana-juku =

Forty-second of the 53 stations of the Tōkaidō

Kuwana-juku 桑名宿
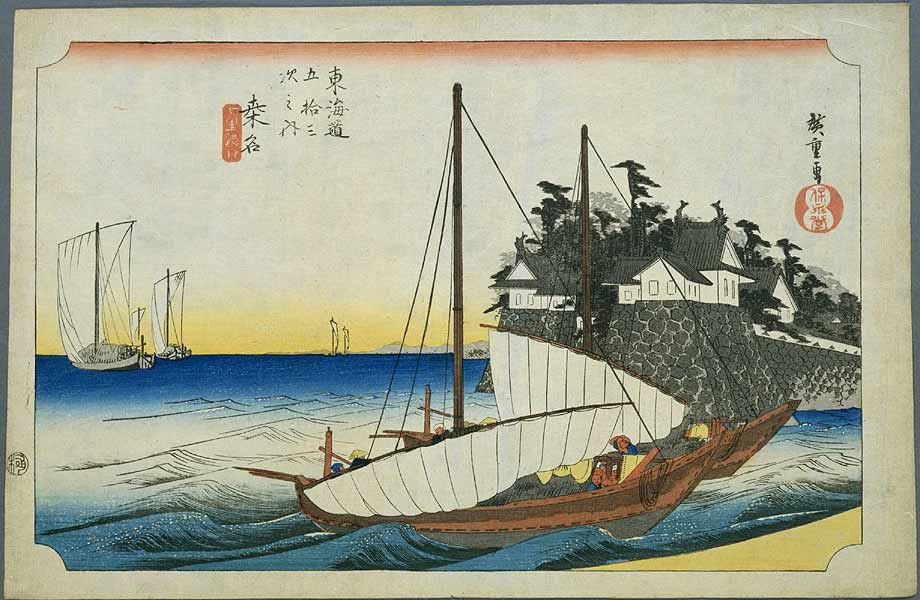
- Hiroshige's print of Kuwana-juku, part of the Hōeidō edition The Fifty-three Stations of the Tōkaidō series

General information
- Location: Kuwana, Mie (former Ise Province); Japan
- Coordinates: 35°04′06.44″N 136°41′46.59″E
- Elevation: 7 m (23 ft)
- System: post station
- Line: Tōkaidō
- Distance: 376.9 km from Edo
Location
- Location within Mie Prefecture Location within Japan

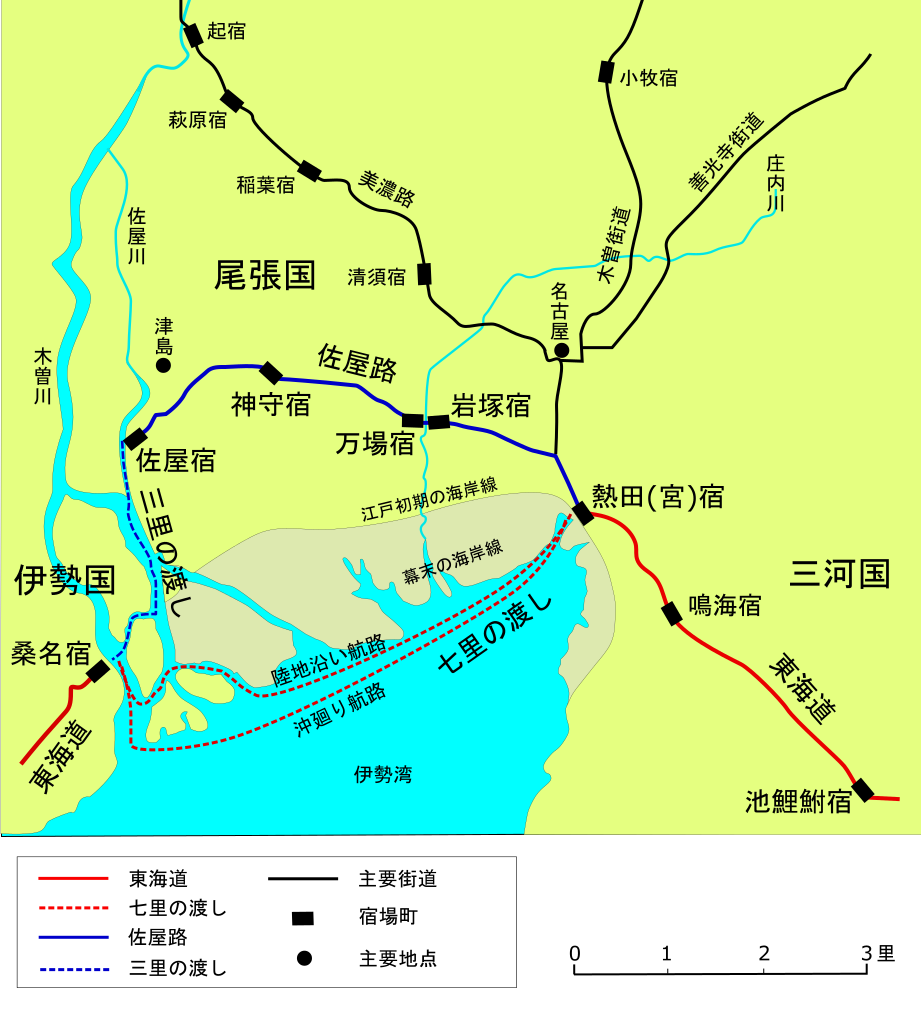
Map showing the routes between Kuwana-juku and Miya-juku

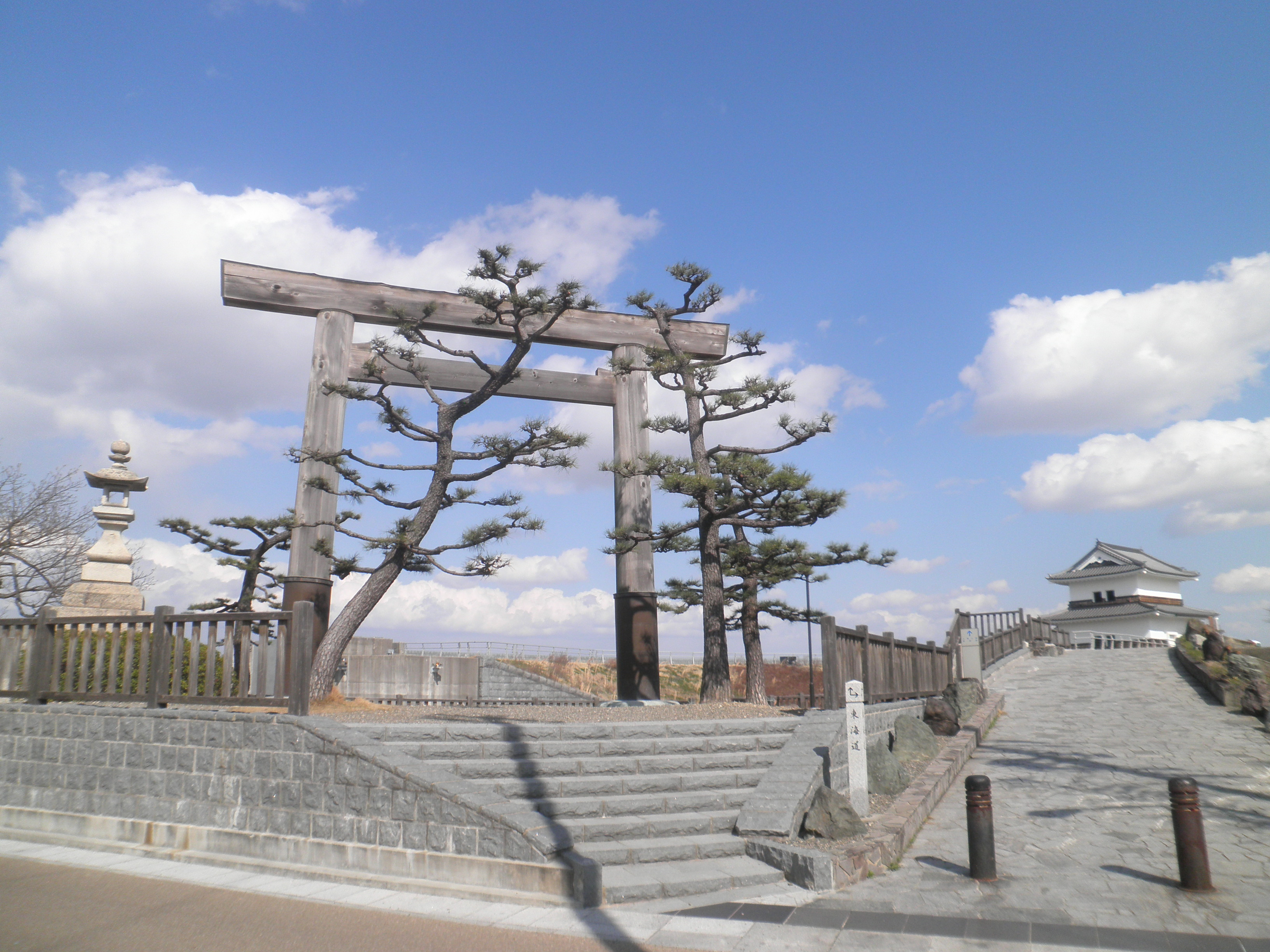
Shichiri no watashi torii

Kuwana-juku (桑名宿, Kuwana-juku) was the forty-second of the fifty-three stations (shukuba) of the Tōkaidō connecting Edo with Kyoto in Edo period Japan. It was located in former Ise Province in what is now part of the city of Kuwana, Mie Prefecture, Japan.

== History ==
Kuwana-juku was located in the castle town of Kuwana Domain, which was a major security barrier on the Tōkaidō for the Tokugawa shogunate. The post station was located on the western shores of the Ibi River. Between Kuwana and the next station to the west, Miya-juku, were the Kiso Three Rivers, which included the Nagara River and the Kiso River in addition to the Ibi River. As all three rivers were near their outlets to Ise Bay, their channels were wide, and the shogunate forbid the construction of any bridges, as this would facilitate the crossing of any army from the west across the rivers towards Edo. This posed a problem, however, for travelers. The preferred connection for many travelers between Kuwana-juku and Miya-juku was by the Shichiri no watashi (七里の渡し), a roughly 28-kilometer boat ride across Ise Bay. A large torii gate on the Kuwana side of the crossing indicated that this was also on the route for pilgrims to the Ise Grand Shrine. For those leery of travel on the ocean, the alternative was the Saya Kaidō (佐屋街道), which consisted of a shorter riverboat ride, the Sanri no watashi (三里の渡し) which connected Kuwana-juku with Saya-juku (佐屋宿), a post station in Owari Province, and thence overland via the Saya Kaidō highway to Miya-juku, with three intermediate post stations en route. This route was roughly eight kilometers longer than the direct sea route, and was much more expensive in terms of tolls, but was also much quicker. This route was constructed by Owari Domain for the visit of Shogun Tokugawa Ieyasu to Kyoto, and was the route used two centuries later by Emperor Meiji when he first travelled from Kyoto to Tokyo.

Per the 1843 "東海道宿村大概帳" (Tōkaidō Shukuson Taigaichō) guidebook issued by the Inspector of Highways (道中奉行, Dōchu-būgyō), the town had a population of 8849 in 2544 houses, including two honjin, four wakihonjin, and 120 hatago, making it one of the largest of the post stations on the highway. The popular local specialities of Kuwana-juku was grilled hamaguri clams, whitebait and banko ware pottery. Kuwana-juku was 376.9 kilometers from Edo.

During the Edo period, Kuwana was directly on the shores of the river, but after the Kansai Railroad built Kuwana Station, the city center was shifted further to the west.

== Kuwana-juku in The Fifty-three Stations of the Tōkaidō ==
Utagawa Hiroshige's ukiyo-e Hōeidō edition print of Kuwana-juku dates from 1833 -1834. The print depicts the two large ships of the Shichiri no watashi ferries preparing to depart with travelers from in front of Kuwana Castle, with other ships sailing away in the background.

== Neighboring post towns ==
Tōkaidō
Miya-juku - Kuwana-juku - Yokkaichi-juku
Saya Kaidō
Saya-juku - Kuwana-juku (ending location)
