= Okoshi-juku =

Coordinates: 35°18′22″N 136°44′12″E

Okoshi-juku (起宿, Okoshi-juku) was the sixth of nine post stations along the Minoji. It is located in the present-day city of Ichinomiya, Aichi Prefecture, Japan. Established on edge of the Kiso River, the post station was also on the border of Mino and Owari provinces.

== History ==
When the Joseon missions were traveling through Okoshi-juku, 270 boats were used to create a pontoon bridge 800 m (2,625 ft) meters long.

The ruins of the post station's honjin can still be seen. The honjin's eleventh manager, Katō Isotari (加藤磯足), was a student of the famed scholar Motoori Norinaga.

== Neighboring post towns ==
Minoji
Hagiwara-juku - Okoshi-juku - Sunomata-juku
