= Ōgaki-juku =

Station located in Japan

- Post station / Castle town
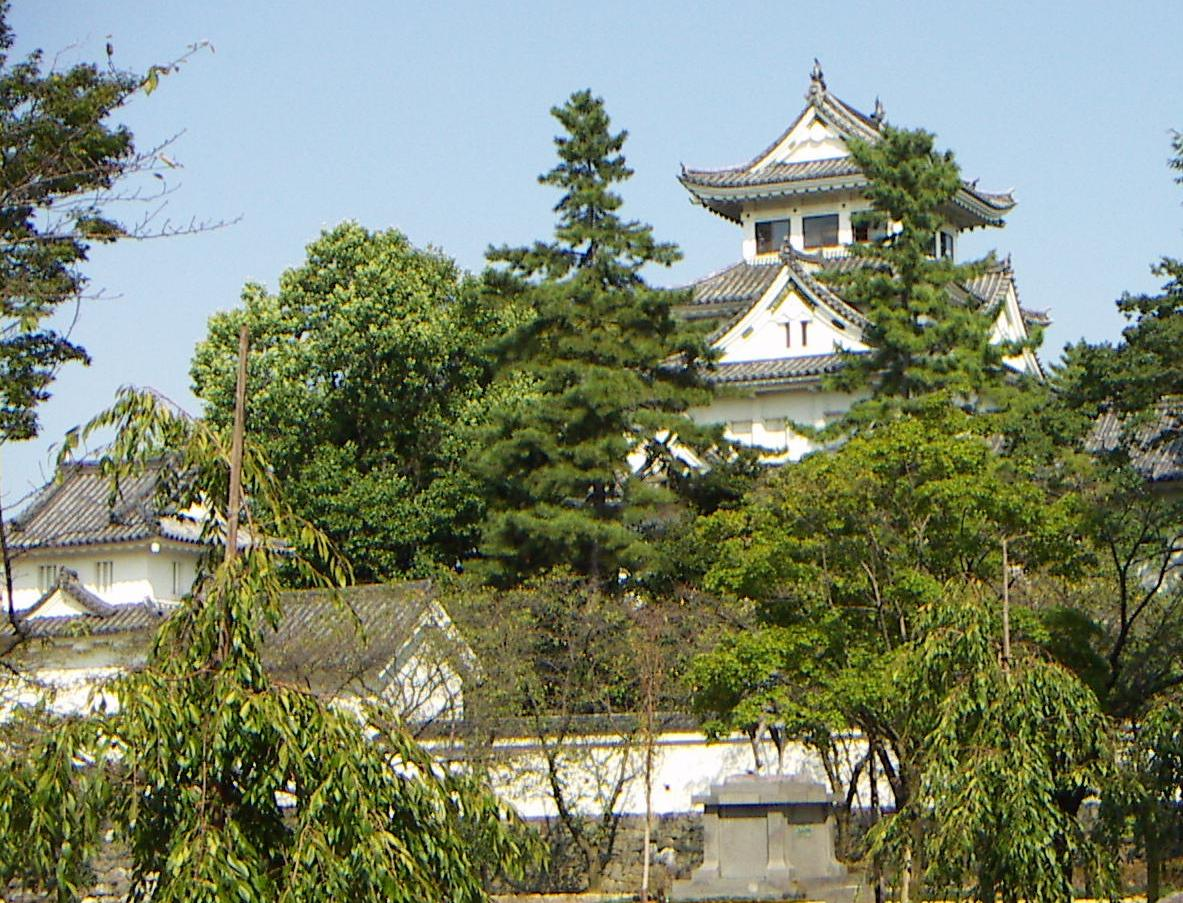
- Ōgaki Castle

Ōgaki-juku (大垣宿, Ōgaki-juku) was the eighth of nine post stations along the Minoji. It is located in the present-day city of Ōgaki, Gifu Prefecture, Japan. In addition to serving as a post station, it was also a castle town to the Ōgaki Domain's Ōgaki Castle. Its dual role is very similar to that of the nearby Kanō-juku along the Nakasendō.

== Town layout ==
Ōgaki stretched approximately 2.9 km (1.8 mi) from west to east, though its main gates were only 1.1 km (0.7 mi) apart. The location of the former post station can be traced along the Tenma-chō, Hon-machi, Takejima-chō, Tawara-machi, Funa-machi, and Kusegawa-chō areas of the city.

== Neighboring post towns ==
Minoji
Sunomata-juku - Ōgaki-juku - Tarui-juku
