= Nangū Taisha =

Shinto shrine in Gifu Prefecture, Japan

Nangū Taisha 南宮大社
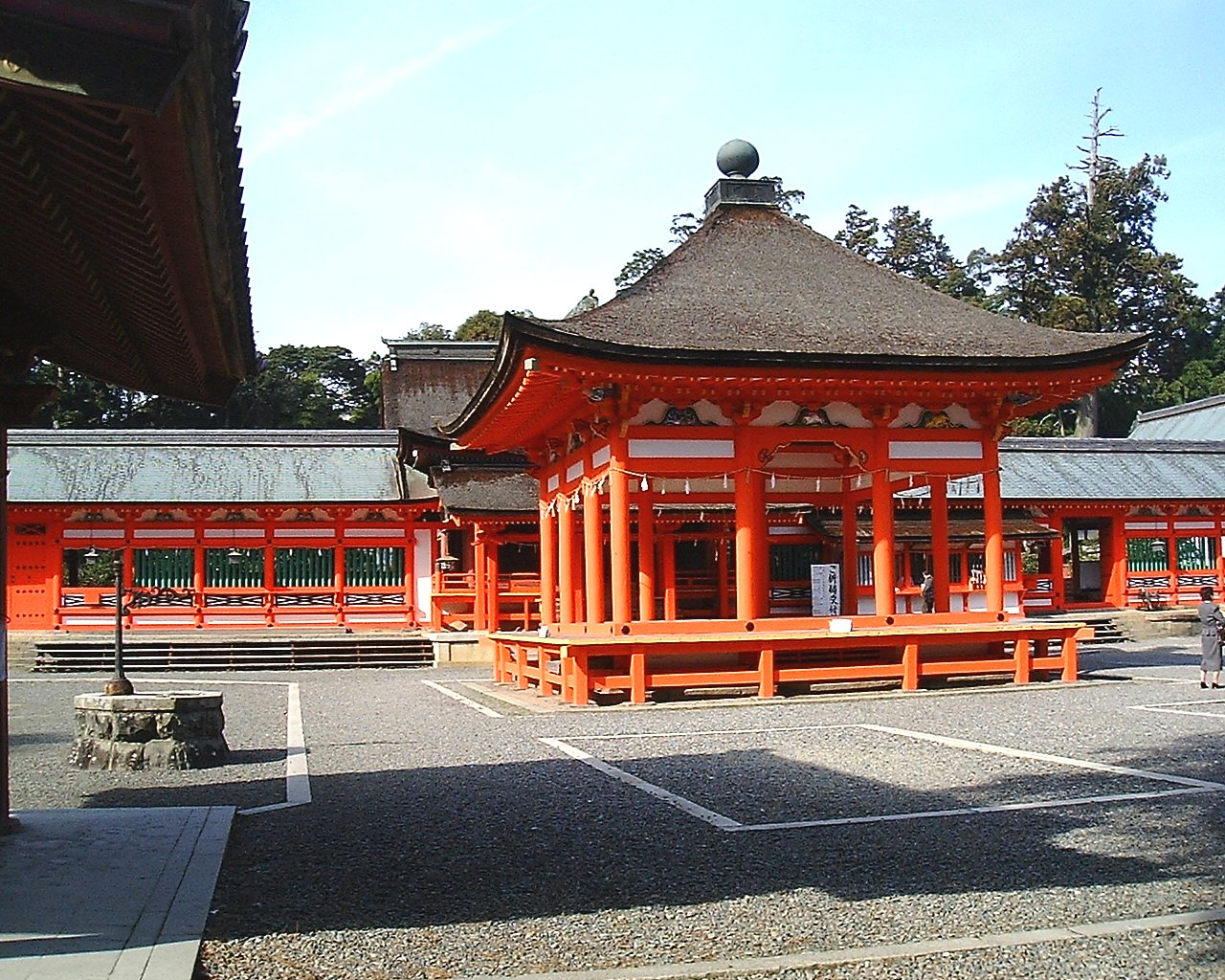
- Nangū Taisha

- Nangū Taisha Nangū Taisha (Japan)

Religion
- Affiliation: Shinto
- Deity: Kanayama-hiko (金山彦命)
- Festival: May 5

Location
- Location: 1734-1 Miyashiromine, Tarui-cho, Gifu-ken Japan
- Interactive map of Nangū Taisha 南宮大社
- Coordinates: 35°21′39.5″N 136°31′31.1″E

Architecture
- Established: c. Emperor Sujin (97 BC – 30 BC)

Website
- Official website

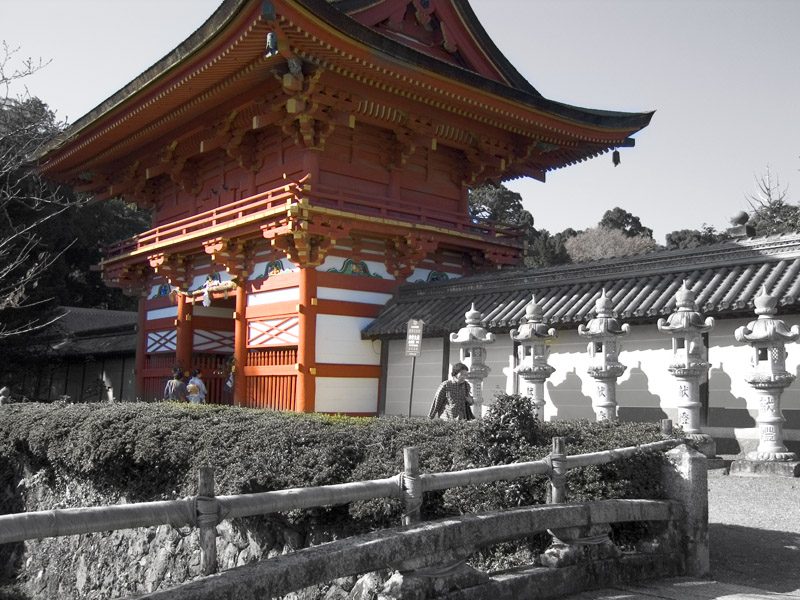
Nangū Taisha

Nangū Taisha (南宮大社) is a Shinto shrine located in the town of Tarui in Fuwa District, Gifu Prefecture, Japan. It is the ichinomiya of former Mino Province. The main festival of the shrine is held annually on May 25. The shrine precincts contain 18 structures from the Edo period, which are designated national Important Cultural Properties. The main building of the shrine is rebuilt every 51 years.

== Enshrined kami ==
The kami enshrined at Nangū Taisha is:

- Kanayama-hiko-no-mikoto (金山彦命), the kami of mining and the metals industry.

== History ==
Nangū Taisha is located in the southwestern corner of Gifu Prefecture, at the foot of Mount Nangū. The name "Nangū" derives from its location to the south of the ancient Mino Provincial Capital. Nangū Taisha claims to have been first built during the reign of the legendary Emperor Sujin (97 BC – 30 BC), although there are no historical records prior to its mention in the 836 Shoku Nihon Kōki and in the 859 Nihon Sandai Jitsuroku. The mid-Heian period Engishiki confirmed its status as a myōjin taisha (名神大社). The shrine was destroyed by a fire in 1501, which destroyed all its records. It was rebuilt by Toki Masafusa, the shugo of Mino Province in 1511.

During the nearby Battle of Sekigahara in 1600, the shrine was again completely burnt to the ground and was not rebuilt until 1642, when Shogun Tokugawa Iemitsu sponsored the construction efforts. The shrine retains a document which details the cost of the reconstruction. In 1867, as a result of shinbutsu bunri, the Buddhist temple located on the shrine grounds was moved to a different location and named Shinzen-in (真禅院). In 1871, the shrine was designated as a National shrine, 2nd rank (国幣中社, Kokuhei Chūsha) under the Modern system of ranked Shinto shrines of State Shinto. It was promoted to a National shrine, 1st rank (国幣大社, Kokuhei Taisha) in 1925, and its name was changed from "Jinja" to "Taisha" to reflect its more important status.

The shrine is located approximately one kilometer southwest of Tarui Station on the JR Tokai Tōkaidō Main Line.

== Nangū Otabi Shrine ==
Nangū Otabi Shrine (南宮御旅神社, Nangū Otabi Jinja) is the Soja Shrine of Mino Province. It enshrines all fhe deities of the province

Whenever a new kokushi was appointed by the central government to govern a province, it was necessary for him to visit all of the sanctuaries of his province in order to complete the rites necessary for ceremonial inauguration. Grouping the kami into one location near the capital of the province greatly facilitated this duty,

== Gallery ==
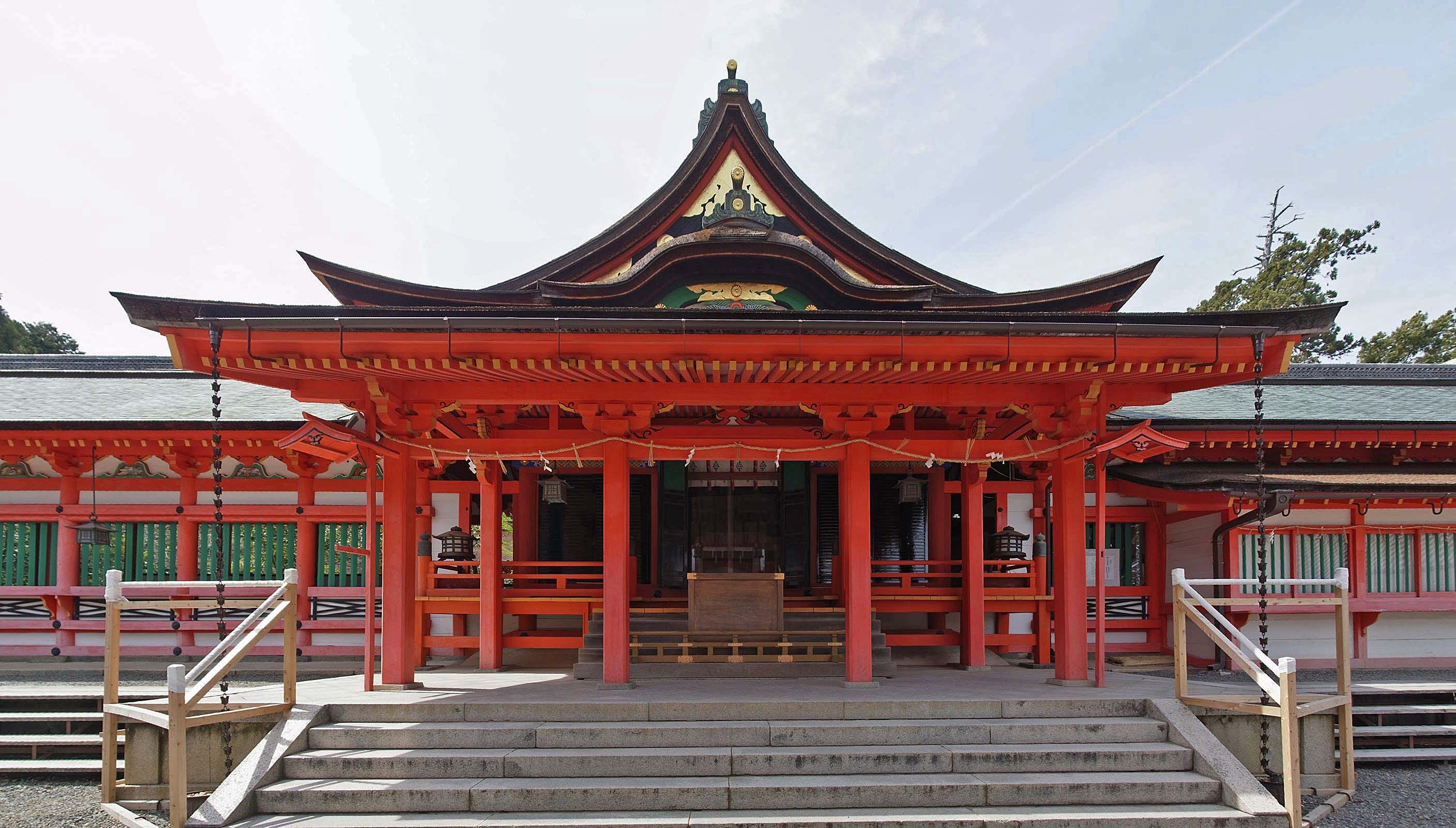
Haiden (ICP)

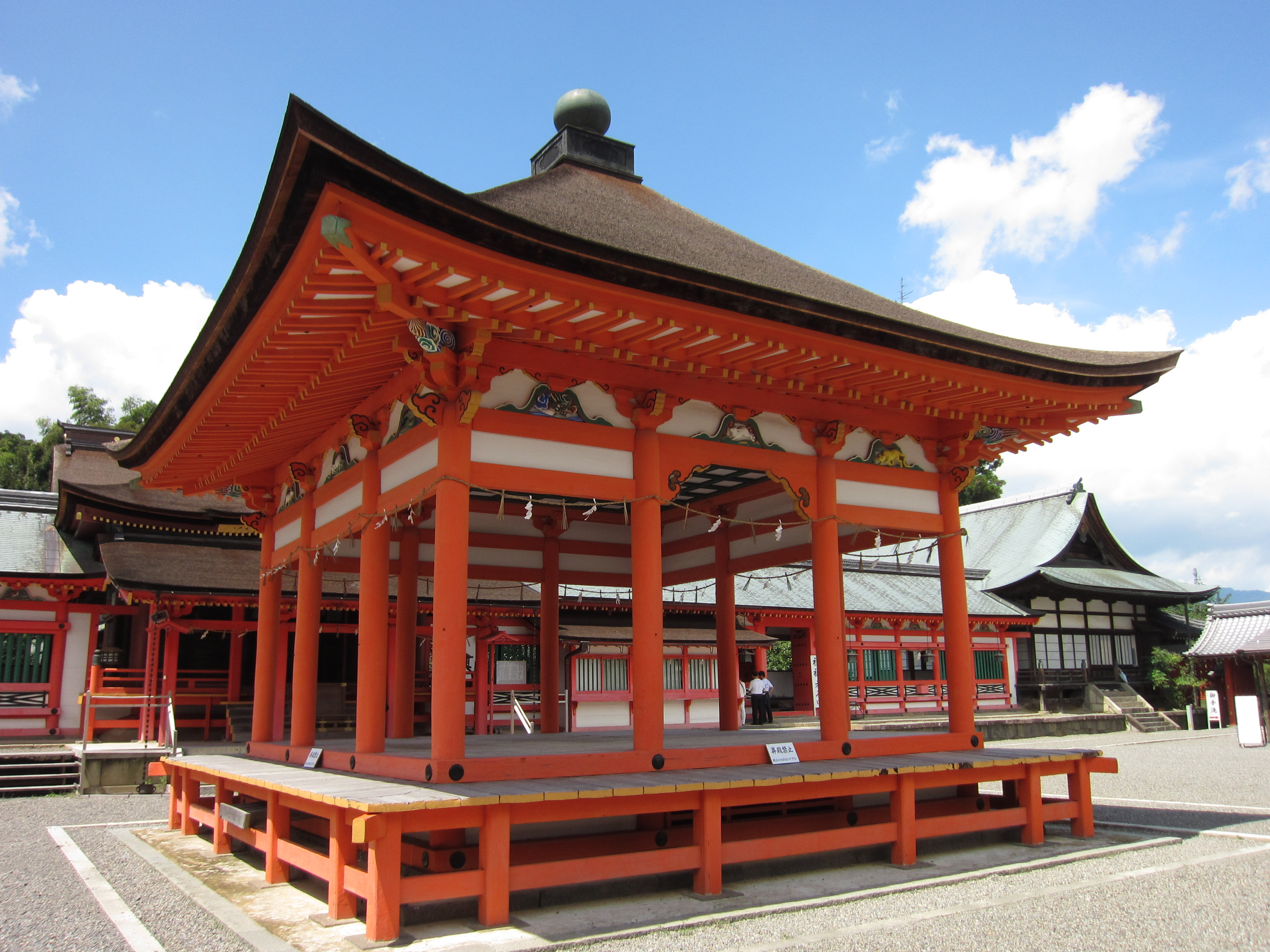
Kobu-den (ICP)

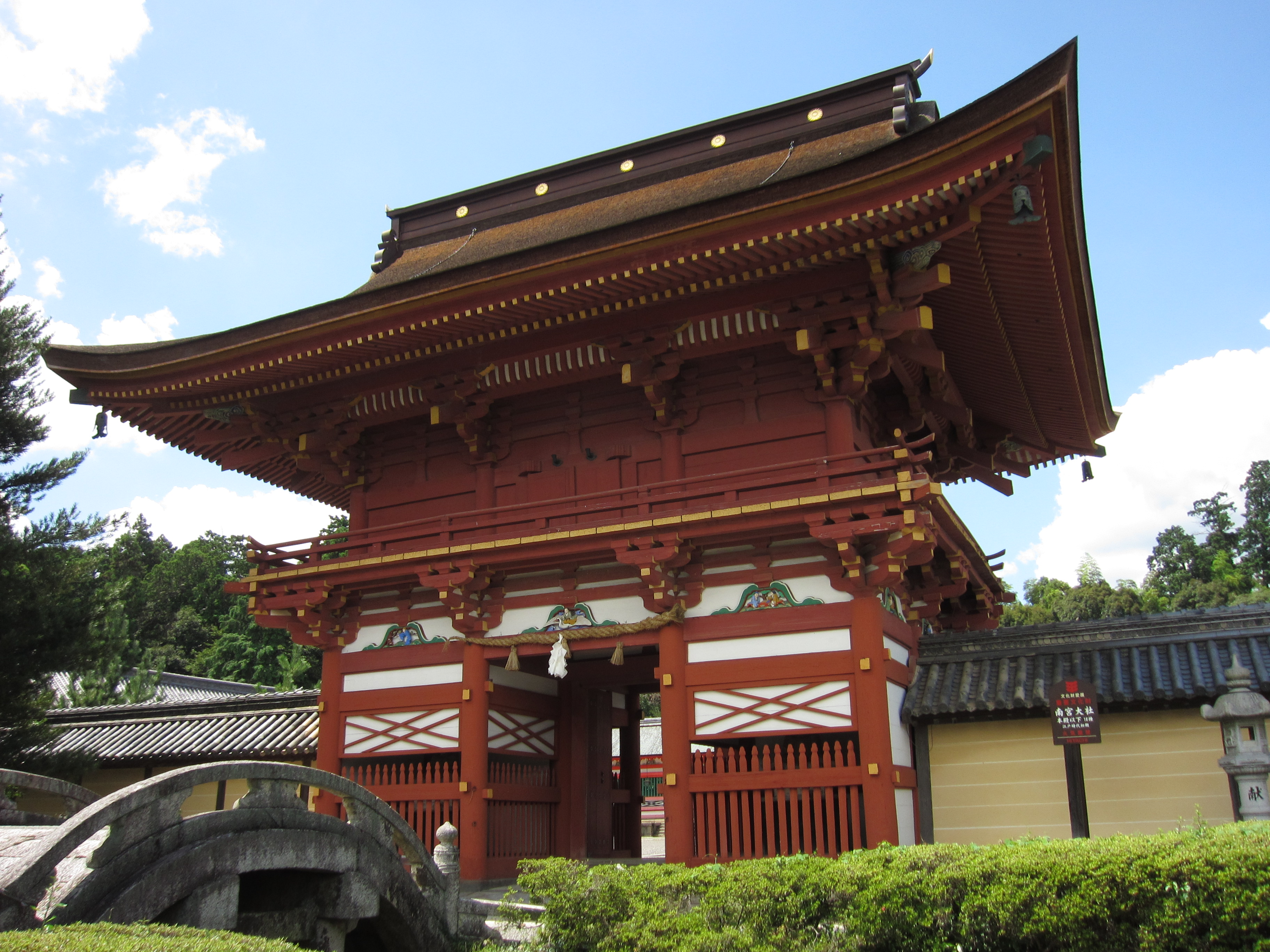
Rōmon (ICP)

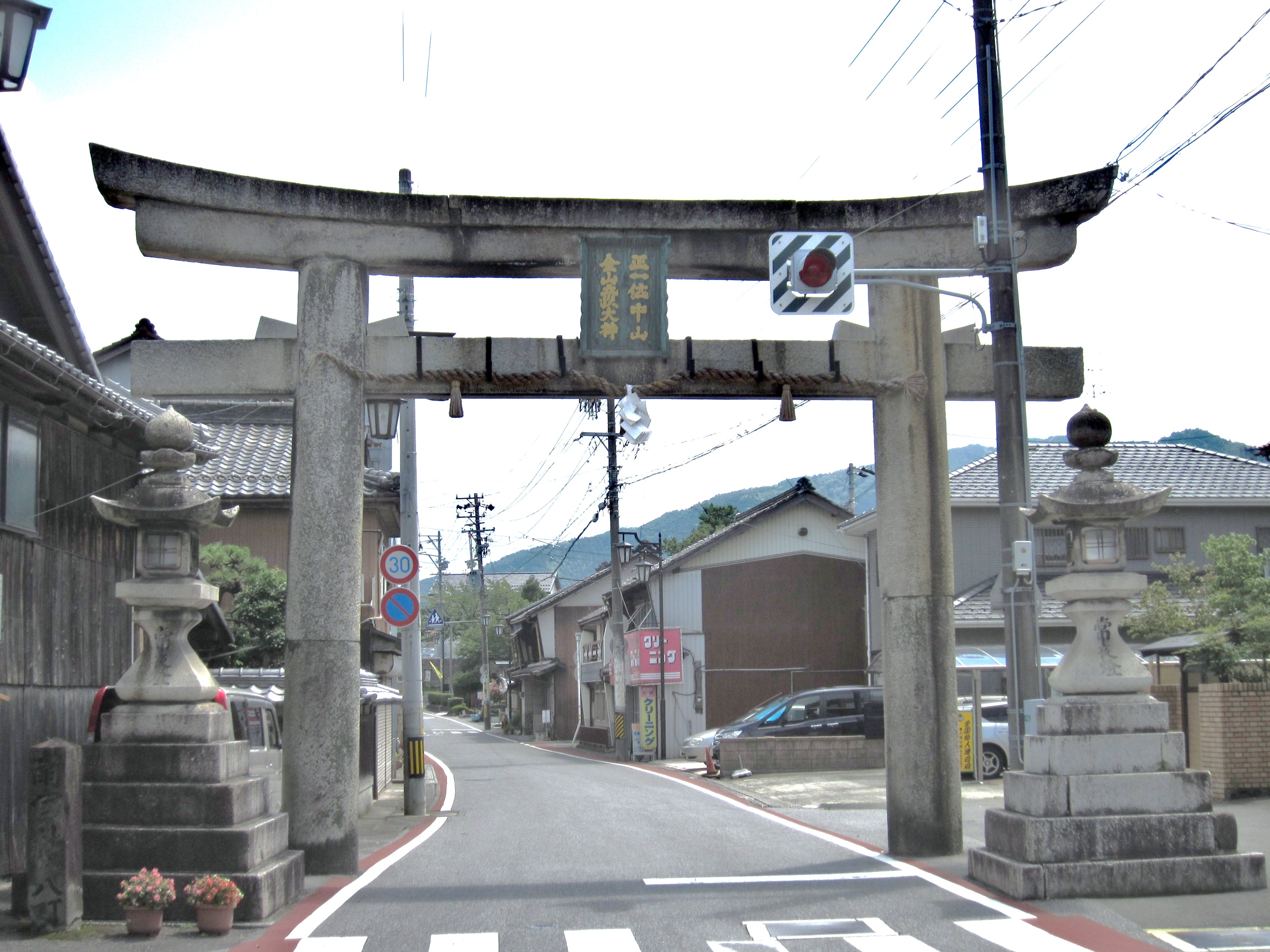
Stone Torii (ICP)

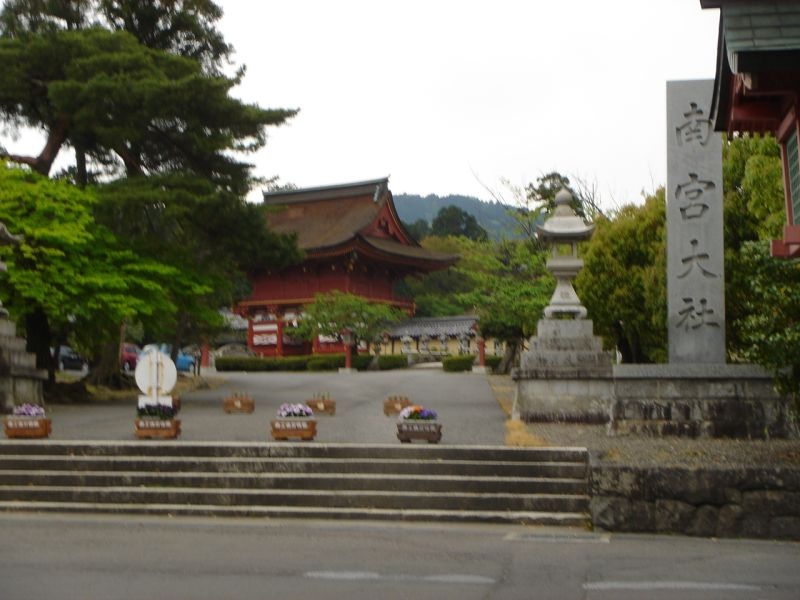
Entry

Great Torii

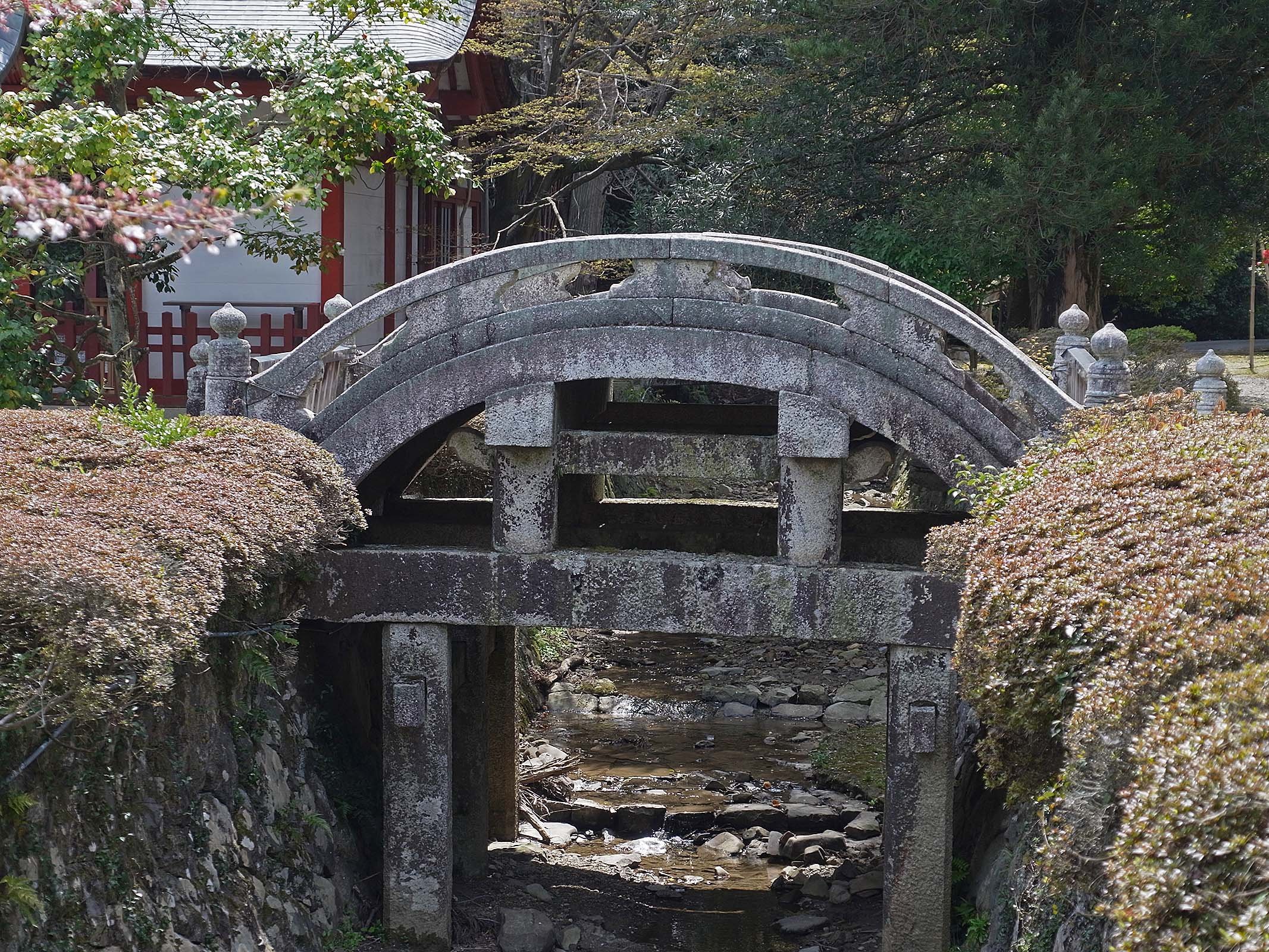
Ring Bridge (ICP)

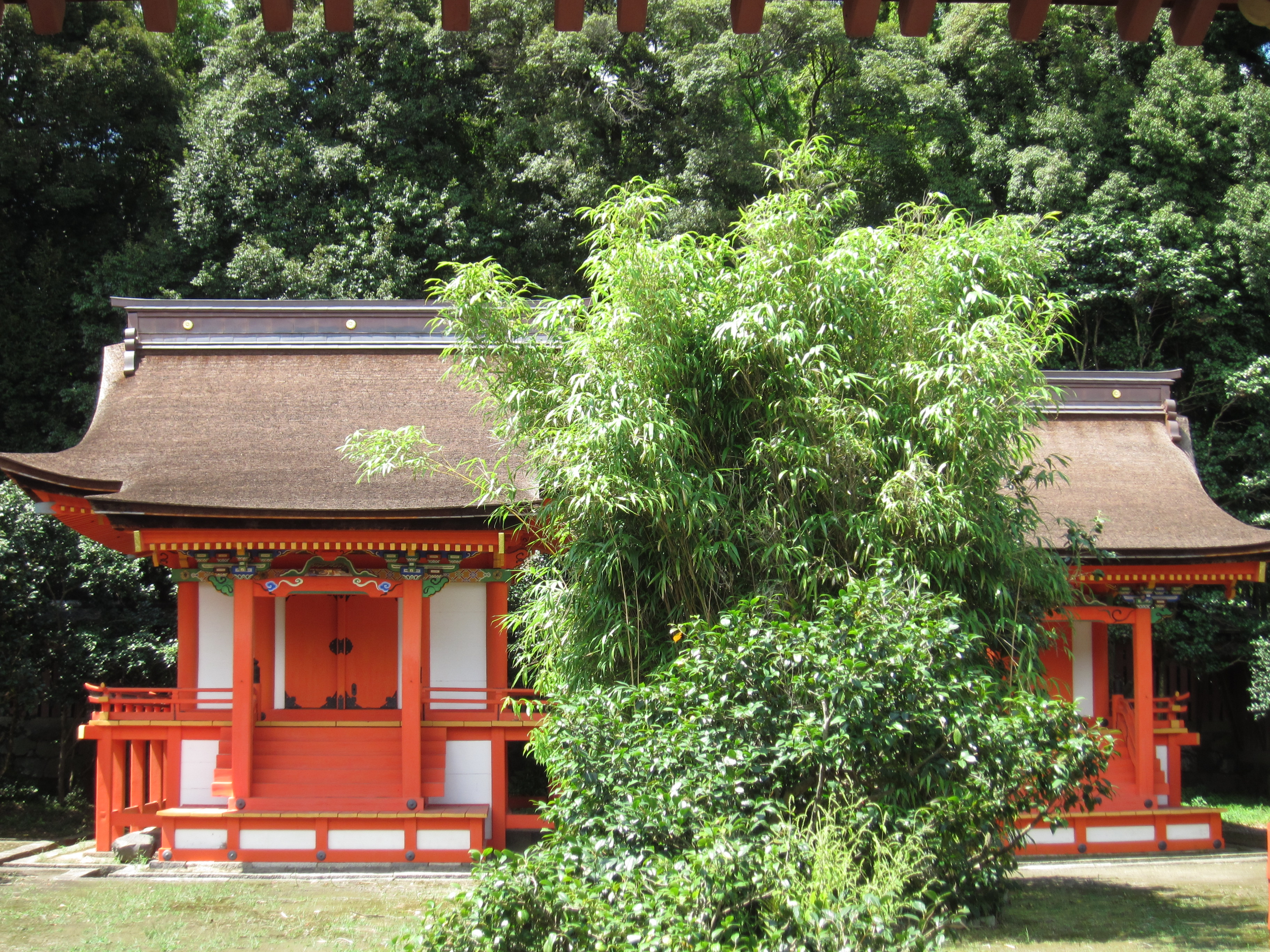
Sub-shrine Juge Shrine & Sub-shrine Takayama Shrine (ICPs)

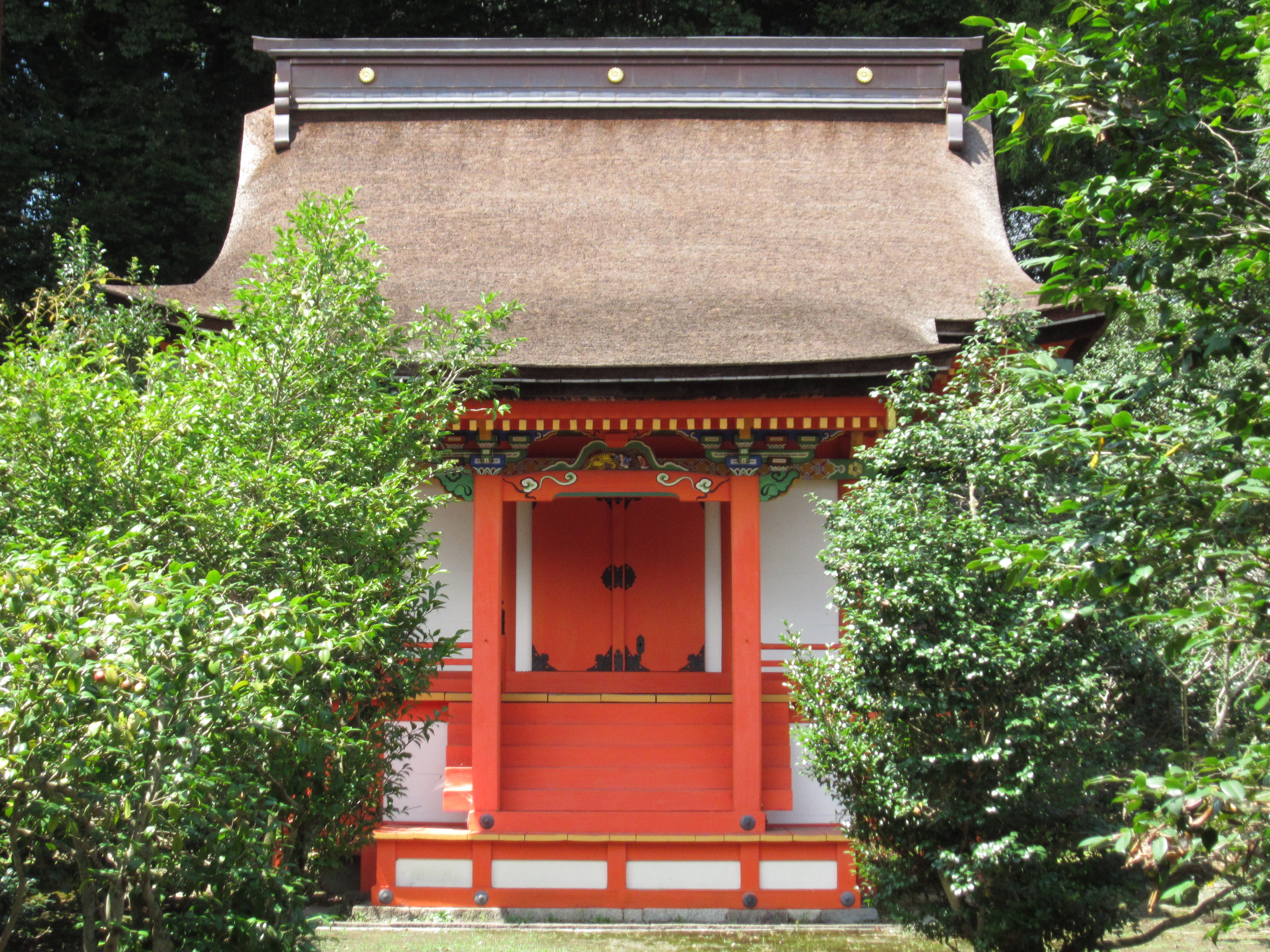
Sub-shrine Takayama Shrine (ICP)

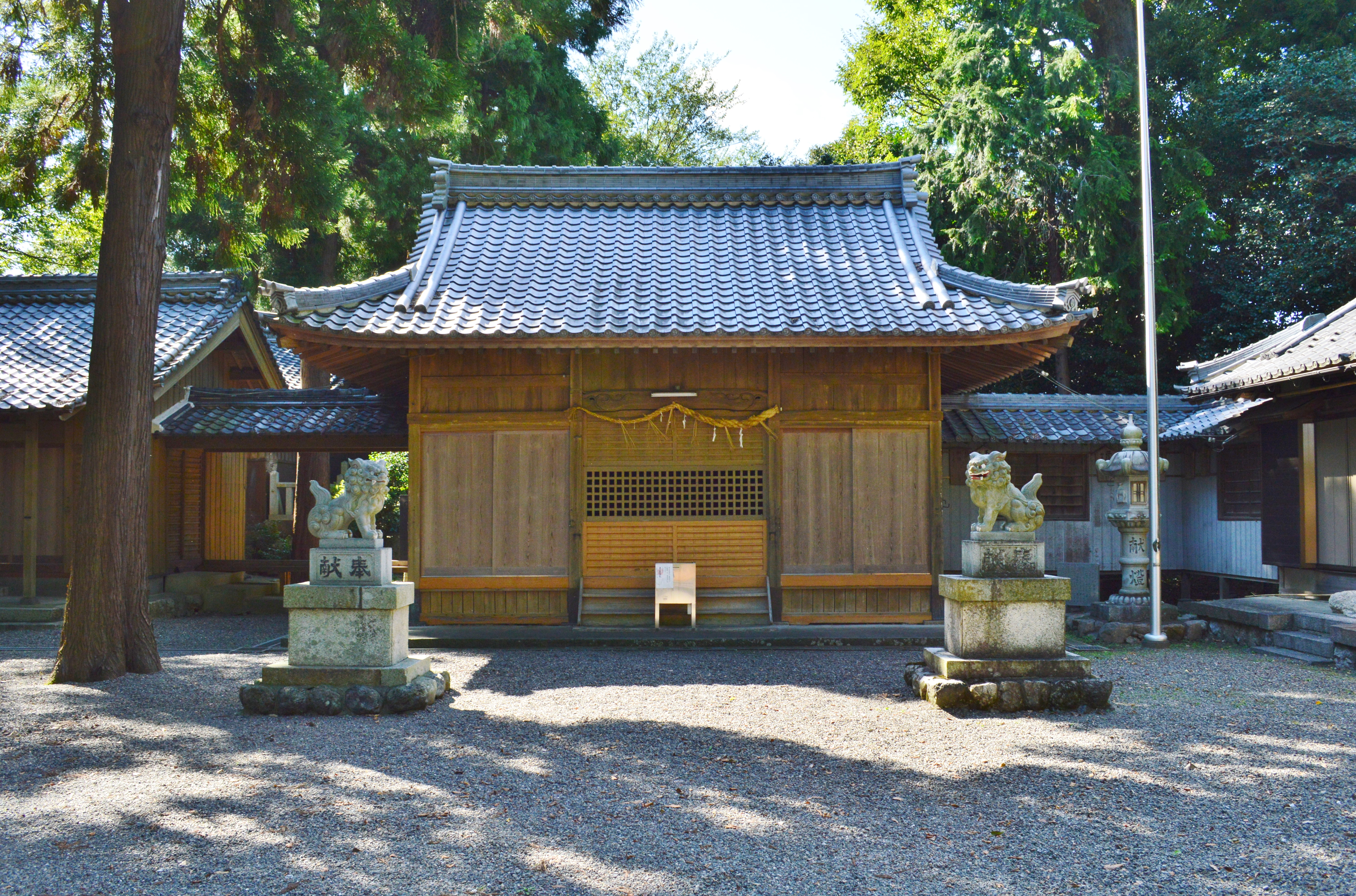
Soja shrine Nangu Otabi Shrine

== Cultural Properties ==
=== Important Cultural Properties ===
- Honden (本殿) Edo period (1642).
- Heiden (幣殿) Edo period (1642).
- Haiden (拝殿) Edo period (1642).
- Kairō (回廊) Edo period (1642).
- Chokushi-den (勅使殿) Edo period (1642).
- Kobu-den (高舞殿) Edo period (1642).
- Rōmon (楼門) Edo period (1642).
- Mikoshi Garage (神輿舎) Edo period (1642).
- Shinkanro (神官廊) Edo period (1642).
- Sub-shrine Juge Jinja Honden (摂社樹下神社本殿) Edo Period (1642)
- Sub-shrine Takayama Jinja Honden (摂社高山神社本殿) Edo Period (1642)
- Sub-shrine Hayato Jinja Honden (摂社隼人神社本殿) Edo Period (1642)
- Sub-shrine Nandai Jinja Honden (摂社南大神神社本殿) Edo Period (1642)
- Sub-shrine Shichi-ōji Jinja Honden (摂社南大神神社本殿) Edo Period (1642)
- Stone Torii (石鳥居) Edo period (1642); located in Tarui-juku.
- Ring Bridge (輪橋, Rinkyō), Edo period (1642).
- Gekō Bridge (下向橋, Gekōkyō), Edo period (1642).
- Tachi sword (太刀 銘康光) Nanboku-cho period, signed Yasumitsu, donated by Toki Yoriyoshi in 1398
- Tachi sword (太刀), Heian period, signed by Munechika Sanjo
- Halberd blade (鉾（無銘）) Nara period; set of two

=== National Intangible Folk Cultural Properties ===
- Nangu Shrine ritual performances (南宮の神事芸能)

=== Gifu Prefecture Designated Tangible Cultural Properties ===
- Tachi sword (刀（銘 兼元)
- Red and White thread armor (紅糸中白威胴丸) Muromachi period; The overall height is 51.5 cm, the width of the torso is 24.8 cm, and the circumference is 101.0 cm. The body is made of lacquered iron kozane (small metal plates) intertwined on the front and center of the back of the torso. This domaru dates from when the large armor of the Heian and Kamakura periods was replaced with lighter armor for easier movement

== See also ==
- List of Shinto shrines
- Ichinomiya
