= Hagiwara-juku =

Hagiwara-juku (萩原宿, Hagiwara-juku) was the fifth of nine post stations along the Minoji. It is located in the present-day city of Ichinomiya, Aichi Prefecture, Japan. Located on the banks of the Nikkō River, Hagiwara-juku was the smallest post station along the Minoji.

== Neighboring post towns ==
Minoji
Inaba-juku - Hagiwara-juku - Okoshi-juku
