= Sekigahara-juku =

Pre-modern Japan post-station along highway

Sekigahara-juku 関ヶ原宿
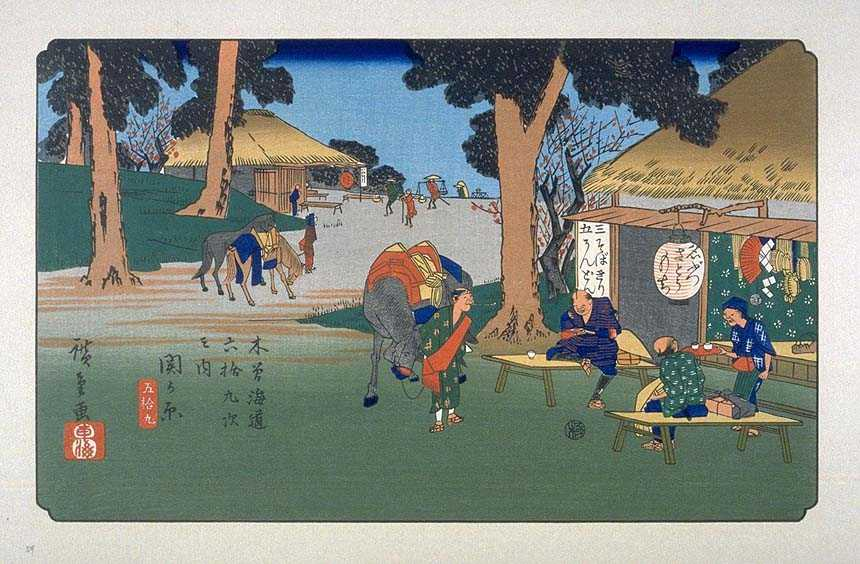
- Hiroshige's print of Sekigahara-juku, part of the Sixty-nine Stations of the Kiso Kaidō series

General information
- Location: Sekigahara, Gifu (former Mino Province); Japan
- Coordinates: 35°21′44.93″N 136°28′09″E
- Elevation: 126 m (413 ft)
- System: post station
- Line: Nakasendō
- Distance: 443 km from Edo
Location
- Location within Gifu Prefecture Location within Japan

Sekigahara-juku (関ヶ原宿, Sekigahara-juku) was the fifty-eighth of the sixty-nine stations of the Nakasendō connecting Edo with Kyoto in Edo period Japan. It is located in former Mino Province in what is now part of the town of Sekigahara, Fuwa District, Gifu Prefecture, Japan.

== History ==
Sekigahara is a strategically important location as is located at the entrance to a narrow pass that was the only land route between Mino Province and Ōmi Province. The name came from a barrier and checkpoint called the "Kuwano-no-seki", which existed since the Asuka period to guard the approaches to the capital from the east. The checkpoint fell out of use in then Heian period, but was received by the Tokugawa Shogunate. The village was also at a junction of the Nakasendō with the Hokkoku Kaidō towards the Sea of Japan and the Ise Kaidō to the Ise Grand Shrine. Due to its location, this area was the site of many battles throughout history, from the Asuka-period Jinshin War to the 1601 Battle of Sekigahara.

In the early Edo period, the system of post stations on the Nakasendō was formalized by the Tokugawa shogunate in 1602, and it became a stopping place for traveling merchants (Ōmi shōnin (近江商人)) who originated from Ōmi Province. It was also on the sankin-kōtai route used by various western daimyō to-and-from the Shogun's court in Edo. Sekigahara is 443 kilometers from Edo. Sekigahara Pass has some of the heaviest snowfalls in Japan, and travelers trapped by early snowfall in autumn were forced to spend time at Sekigahara-juku until the road became passable.

Per the 1843 "中山道宿村大概帳" (Nakasendō Shukuson Taigaichō) guidebook issued by the Inspector of Highways (道中奉行, Dōchu-būgyō), the town had a population of 1389 people in 269 houses, including one honjin, one waki-honjin, and 33 hatago.

Modern Sekigahara is a tourist destination for the locations related to the Battle of Sekigahara. Part of the checkpoint buildings named Fuwano Checkpoint are still standing. But most of the old buildings have been destroyed when the road was modernized and widened allow for a modern motorway and the railway line to pass through.

== Sekigahara-juku in The Sixty-nine Stations of the Kiso Kaidō ==
Utagawa Hiroshige's ukiyo-e print of Sekigahara-juku dates from 1835 -1838. The print depicts travelers seated at a roadside noodle shop, which has signs advertising "Satomochi", a sweet rice cake that was a speciality of this area. Straw hats and straw sandals are also on sale. A man leading a packhorse is observing the scene. In the background is another teahouse and many travelers are heading towards it, indicating the busy nature of this post station.

== Neighboring post towns ==
Nakasendō
Tarui-juku - Sekigahara-juku - Imasu-juku
