= Tarui-juku =

Pre-modern Japan post-station along highway

Tarui-juku 垂井宿
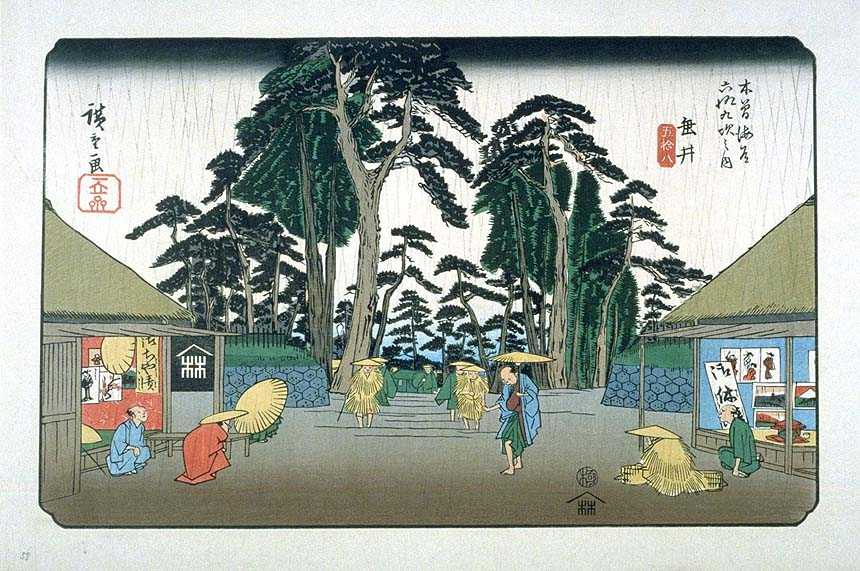
- Hiroshige's print of Tarui-juku, part of the Sixty-nine Stations of the Kiso Kaidō series

General information
- Location: Tarui, Gifu (former Mino Province); Japan
- Coordinates: 35°22′22″N 136°31′34″E
- Elevation: 32 m (105 ft)
- System: post station
- Line: Nakasendō
- Distance: 437.4 km from Edo
Location
- Location within Gifu Prefecture Location within Japan

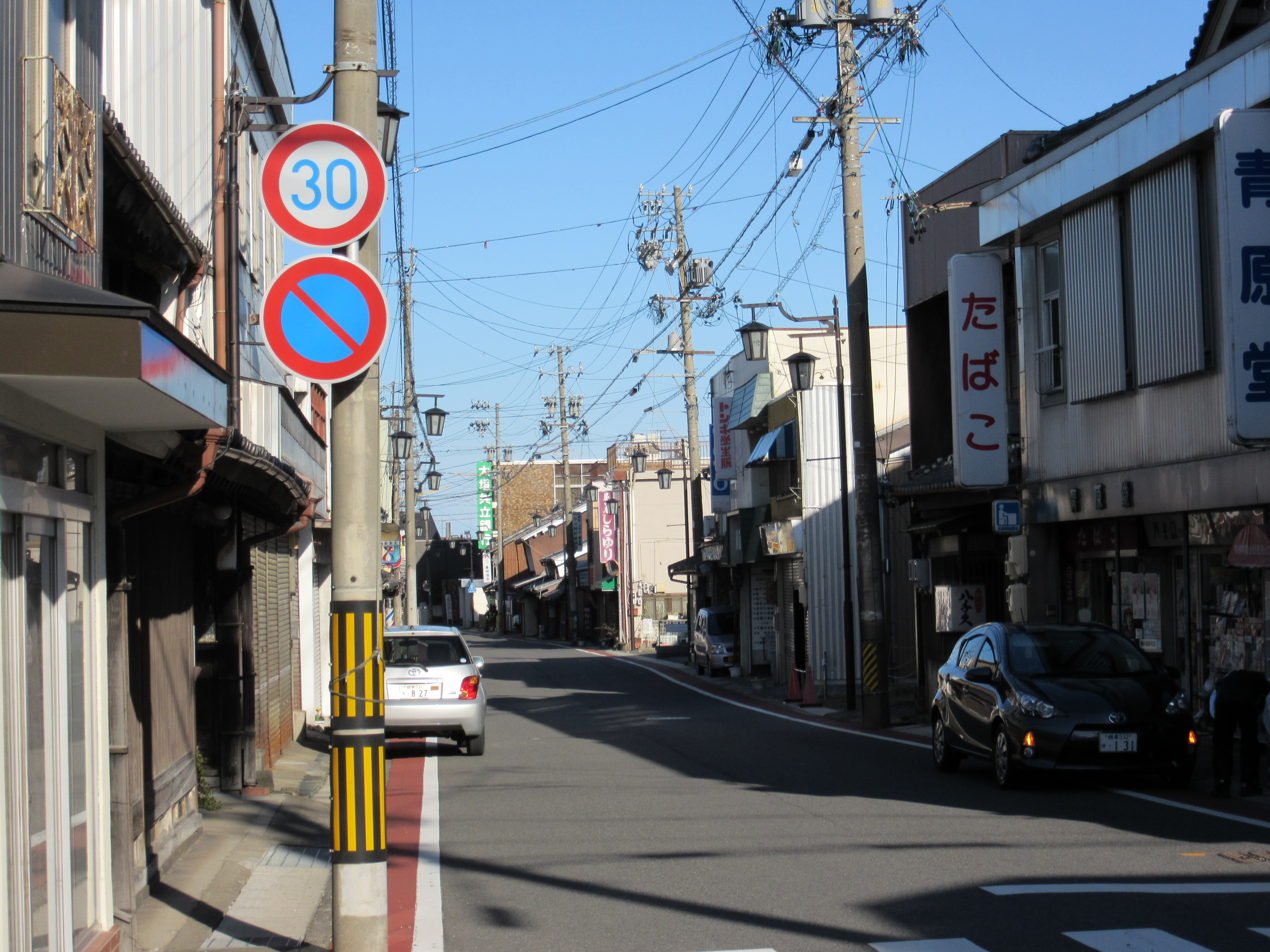
modern Tarui-juku

Tarui-juku (垂井宿, Tarui-juku) was the fifty-seventh of the sixty-nine stations of the Nakasendō connecting Edo with Kyoto in Edo period Japan. It is located in former Mino Province in what is now part of the town of Tarui, Fuwa District, Gifu Prefecture, Japan.

== History ==
Tarui-juku is one of the oldest settlements on the Nakasendō. It is mentioned in 12th century accounts, but is probably much older, as it grew up around the ichinomiya of Mino Province (the Nangū Taisha and the Nara period provincial capital). Its location made it an important market town, as it was also located on an intersection of the Nakasendō with the Minoji, a 60 kilometer secondary road which connected the Nakasendō with the Tōkaidō at Miya-juku, with nine post stations. The town thus served as a major transportation hub for western Mino Province, benefitting also from its location on the banks of the Ai River.

In the early Edo period, the system of post stations on the Nakasendō was formalized by the Tokugawa shogunate in 1602, and it became a stopping place for traveling merchants and was on the sankin-kōtai route used by various western daimyō to-and-from the Shogun's court in Edo. Tarui-juku was divided into three parts: western, middle and eastern. Its honjin was located in the middle section.

Per the 1843 "中山道宿村大概帳" (Nakasendō Shukuson Taigaichō) guidebook issued by the Inspector of Highways (道中奉行, Dōchu-būgyō), the town had a population of 1179 people in 315 houses, including one honjin, one waki-honjin, and 27 hatago.

The honjin was in the middle section of the post station, and only its gate remains. Several old houses are still standing and two old inns, the Nagahama and the Kamemuraya (rebuilt in 1777) still survive.

== Tarui-juku in The Sixty-nine Stations of the Kiso Kaidō ==
Utagawa Hiroshige's ukiyo-e print of Tarui-juku dates from 1835 -1838. The print depicts the pine tree lined route of the highway, with a daimyō procession approaching. A station official walks in front of the procession to warn passersby to kneel to show their respect. Low stone walls mark the border of the post station, and the vanguard of the procession, wearing straw raincoats, has already crossed. The kago with the daimyō inside can just been seen in the distance. On one side of the composition is a tea house advertising Chazuke, a dish made by muring green tea over boiled rice. It also displays the mark of Hiroshige's publisher Kinjudo, and prints for sale can be seen hanging inside the building. Similarly, another open-fronted building selling prints is located on the opposite side of the road.

== Neighboring post towns ==
Nakasendō
Akasaka-juku - Tarui-juku - Sekigahara-juku
Minoji
Ōgaki-juku - Tarui-juku (ending location)
