= Minoji =

The Minoji (美濃路, Mino Road) was a 60 km (37 mi) highway in Japan during the Edo period. It was a secondary route, ranked below the Edo Five Routes in importance, and connected Miya-juku on the Tōkaidō with Tarui-juku on the Nakasendō.

The road received much use before and after the Battle of Sekigahara in 1600. Fukushima Masanori, the leader of the eastern armies, traveled the Minoji from Okoshi (modern-day Ichinomiya) to Mino Province for the battle. Tokugawa Ieyasu, the victor of the battle, traveled the route afterwards to a hero's welcome. It was also referred to as the Kichirei Kaidō (吉例街道).

== Major travelers ==
- Royal embassies to Tokugawa Japan from Korea traveled along the route ten times. Their general itinerary was staying the night in Ōgaki-juku, then resting at either Sunomata-juku or Okoshi-juku, before spending the following night in Nagoya-juku.
- Official travelers from the Ryukyu Islands also traveled along the Minoji. Though initially just traveling along the Tōkaidō, they began traveling along the Mioji in 1714.

== Stations of the Minoji ==
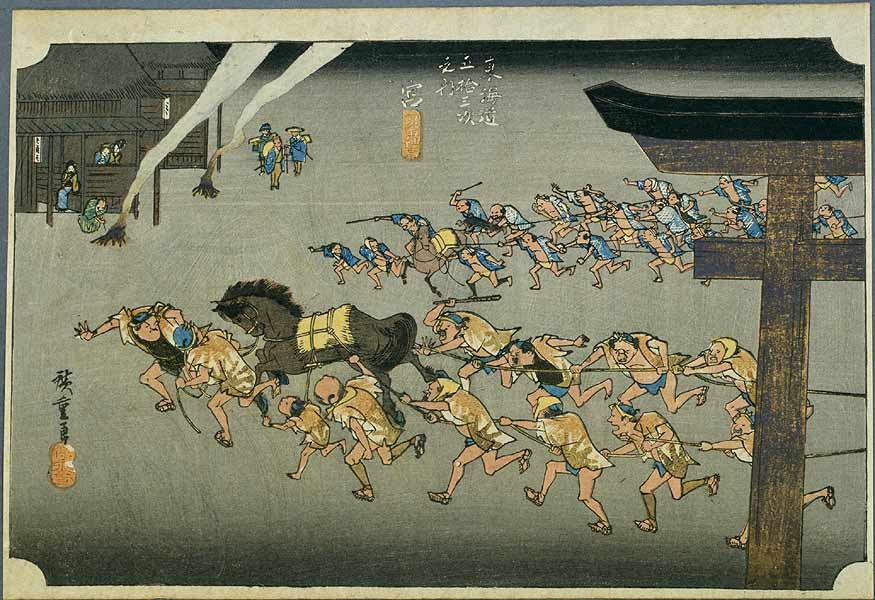
Hiroshige's print of Miya-juku, part of The Sixty-nine Stations of the Kiso Kaidō series

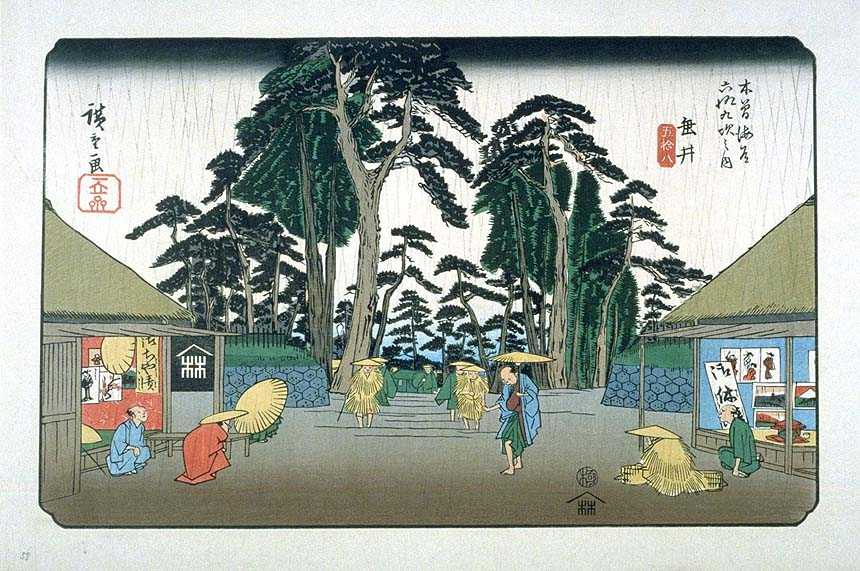
Hiroshige's print of Tarui-juku

Including the starting and ending points, there were only nine post stations on the Minoji. The route was named after Mino Province, which makes up the southern portion of the modern-day Gifu Prefecture. As such, the route spans both Aichi and Gifu prefectures. The stations are listed below, with their current municipality in parentheses.

=== Aichi Prefecture ===
1. Miya-juku (宮宿) (Atsuta-ku, Nagoya) (also part of the Tōkaidō)
2. Nagoya-juku (名古屋宿) (Naka-ku, Nagoya)
3. Kiyosu-juku (清須宿) (Kiyosu)
4. Inaba-juku (稲葉宿) (Inazawa)
5. Hagiwara-juku (萩原宿) (Ichinomiya)
6. Okoshi-juku (起宿) (Ichinomiya)

=== Gifu Prefecture ===
7. Sunomata-juku (墨俣宿) (Ōgaki)
8. Ōgaki-juku (大垣宿) (Ōgaki)
9. Tarui-juku (垂井宿) (Tarui, Fuwa District) (also part of the Nakasendō)

== Other uses ==
The Tōkaidō Main Line, the Tōkaidō Shinkansen and the Tōmei and Meishin expressways all follow the historical Tōkaidō from Tokyo to Nagoya. From Gifu to Kusatsu, the routes all follow the historical Nakasendō. As such, the route between Nagoya and Gifu is also called "Minoji." Also, the modern Route 22 follows the path of the Minoji.

== See also ==
- Edo Five Routes
