= Miya-juku =

Forty-first of the 53 stations of the Tōkaidō

Coordinates: 35.1289°N 136.9143°E

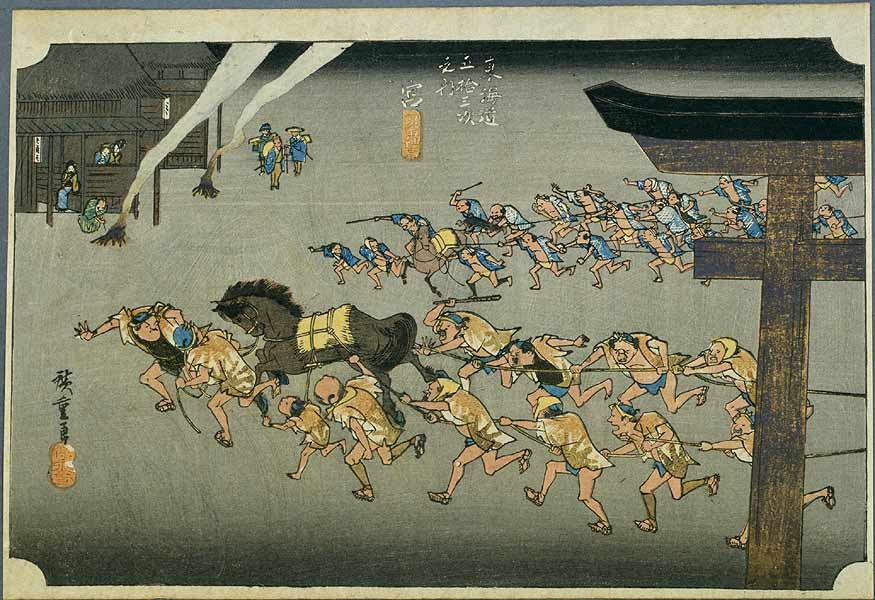
Miya-juku in the 1830s, as depicted by Hiroshige in the Hōeidō edition of The Fifty-three Stations of the Tōkaidō (1831–1834)

Miya-juku (宮宿, Miya-juku) was the forty-first of the fifty-three stations of the Tōkaidō. It is located in former Owari Province in what is now part of the Atsuta-ku section of the city of Nagoya, in Aichi Prefecture, Japan. It was six km from Narumi-juku, the preceding post station.

== History ==
In addition to being a post station on the Tōkaidō, Miya-juku was also part of the Minoji (a minor route which runs to Tarui-juku on the Nakasendō) and the Saya Kaidō. As a result, it had the most hatago of any post station along the Tōkaidō, with two honjin, one wakihonjin and 248 lesser inns.

The classic ukiyo-e print by Andō Hiroshige (Hōeidō edition) from 1831 to 1834 depicts two gangs of men dragging a portable shrine cart (not shown) past a huge torii gate. The torii gate is the symbol of a Shinto shrine, and the name of "Miya" also means a "Shinto shrine". The shrine in question is the famous Atsuta Shrine, one of the most famous in Japan and a popular pilgrimage destination in the Edo period. The area is now part of downtown Nagoya metropolis.

== Neighboring post towns ==
Tōkaidō
Narumi-juku - Miya-juku - Kuwana-juku
Saya Kaidō
Miya-juku (starting location) - Iwazuka-juku
Minoji
Miya-juku (starting location) - Nagoya-juku
