= Honjin =

Resting area of pre-modern Japanese government officials

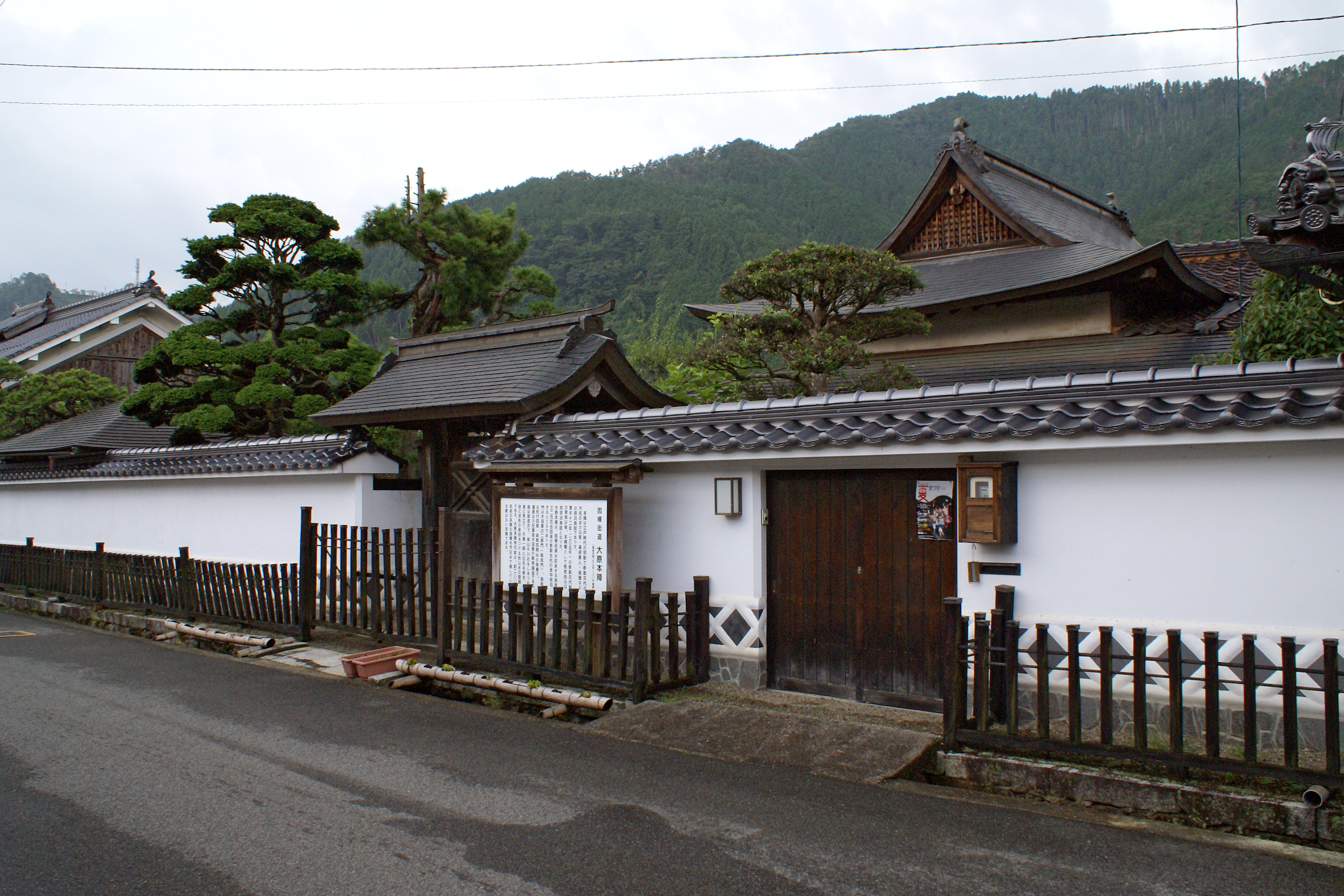
The honjin at Inaba Kaidō's Ōhara-shuku.

Honjin (本陣) is the Japanese word for an inn for government officials, generally located in post stations (shukuba) during the later part of the Edo period.

== Evolution of Honjin ==
Originally, honjin were places from which generals directed battles and, therefore, were fleeting in nature. However, as commanders began to transform the honjin into temporary lodgings during battle and travel, honjin came to be places where daimyō and other representatives of the shogunate, including hatamoto, monzeki, etc., were allowed to stay during their travels. Many of the honjin were actually personal residences of village and town leaders. As such, they received official designations from the government and expanded their residences to include walls, gates and other features. Because of their cooperation, the owners of the honjin also gained various special rights. General travelers, regardless of status or money, were not able to stay at honjin.

== Waki-honjin ==
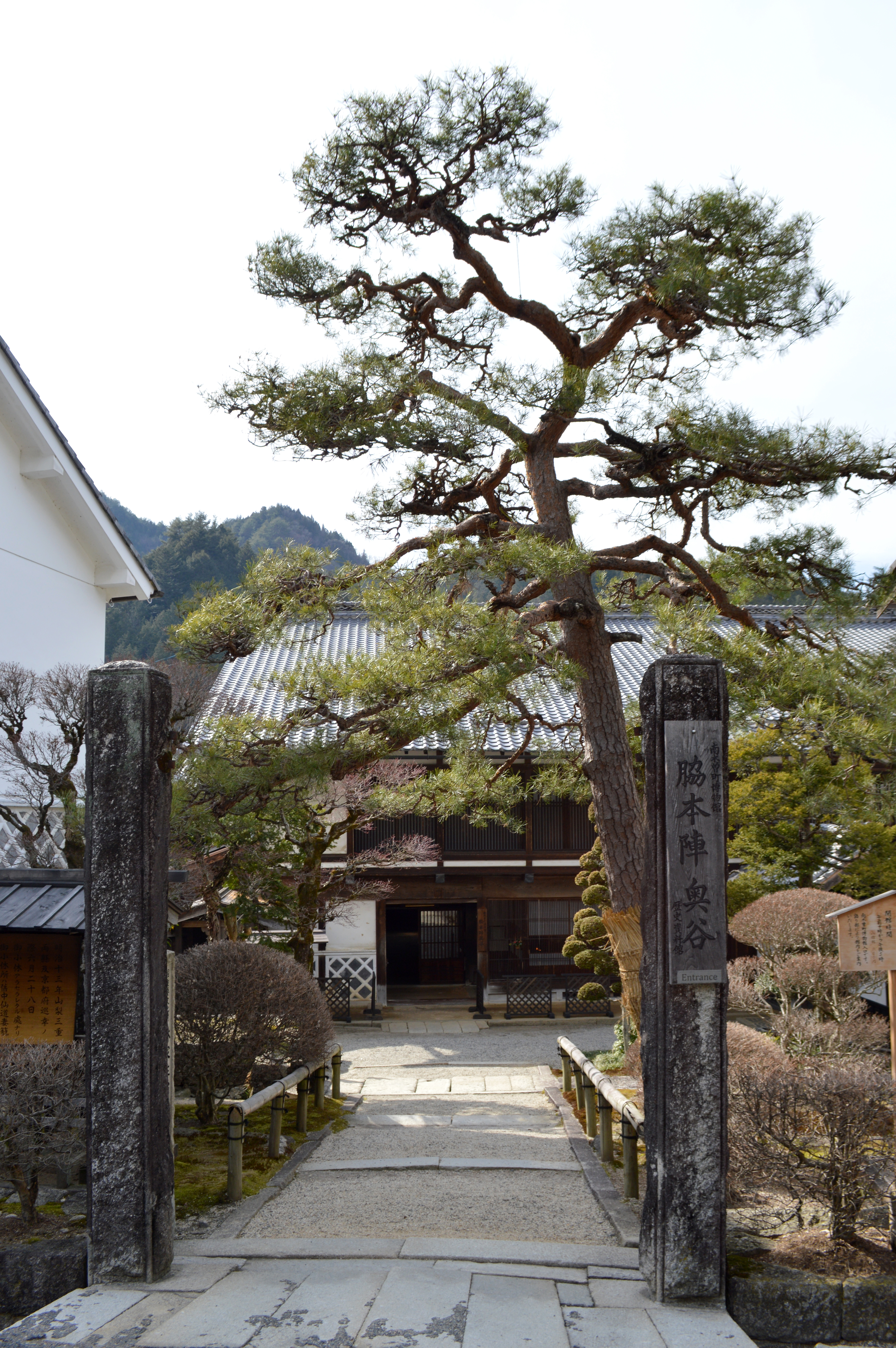
The waki-honjin in Tsumago-juku

Waki-honjin (脇本陣), also referred to as "sub-honjin," are similar in structure and operation to, but generally smaller than, honjin. The rules of operation were also slightly different. When two official traveling parties are staying in the same post station, the more powerful of the two stayed in the main honjin. The major difference, though, is that general travelers were able to stay at the waki-honjin, if they had enough status or money.

== Honjin open to the public ==
The honjin or waki-honjin of the following post stations have either been preserved or restored and are now open to be viewed by the public:

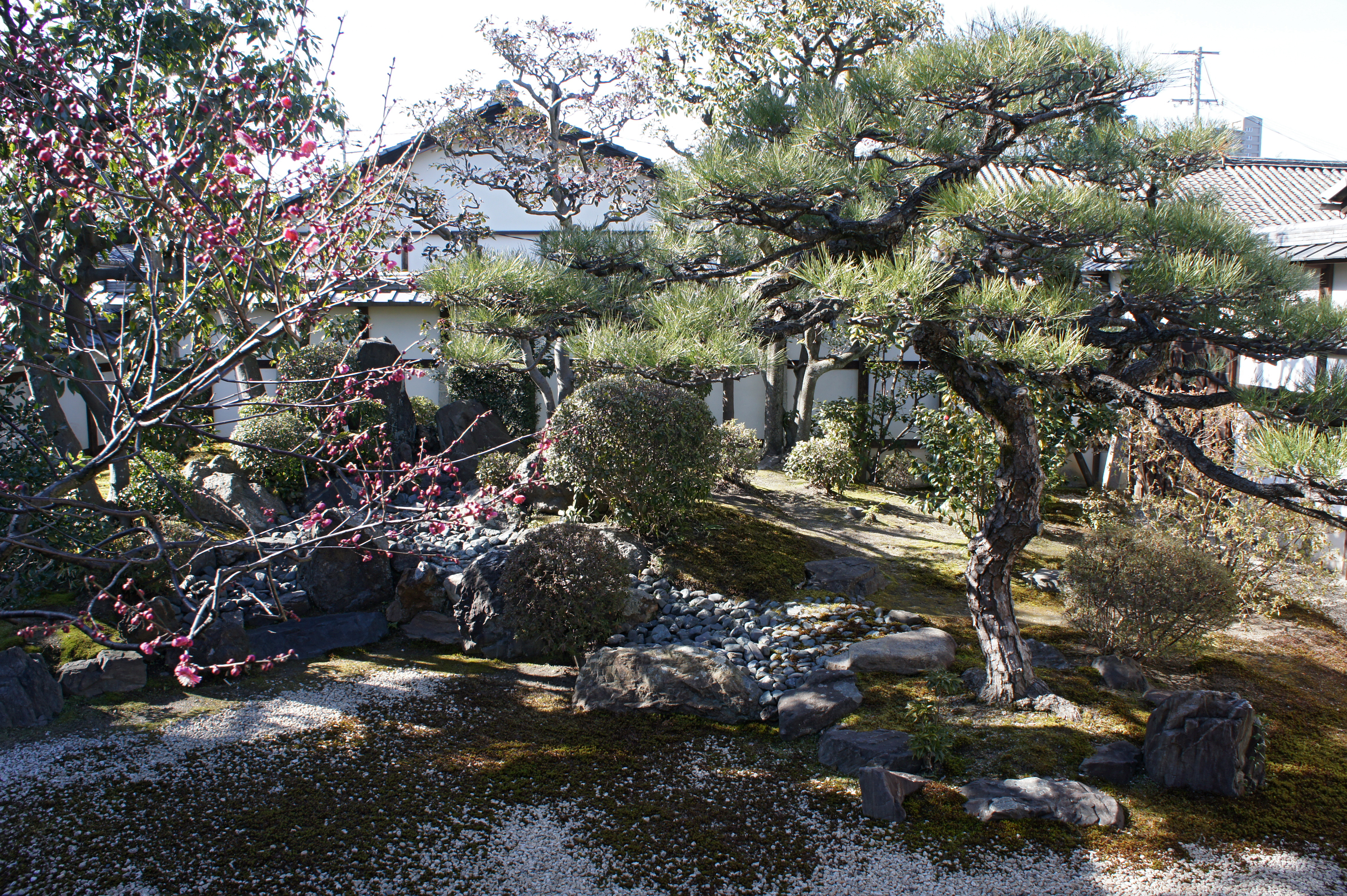
The garden at Kusatsujuku honjin

Tōkaidō:

- Maisaka-juku (Hamamatsu, Shizuoka Prefecture) (waki-honjin)
- Futagawa-juku (Toyohashi, Aichi Prefecture)
- Kusatsu-juku (Kusatsu, Shiga Prefecture) (also part of the Nakasendō)

Nakasendō:

- Okegawa-juku (Okegawa, Saitama Prefecture) (only open during certain times)
- Wada-shuku (Nagawa, Nagano Prefecture)
- Shimosuwa-juku (Shimosuwa, Nagano Prefecture) (also part of the Kōshū Kaidō)
- Tsumago-juku (Nagiso, Nagano)
- Magome-juku (Nakatsugawa, Gifu)
- Ōta-juku (Minokamo, Gifu Prefecture) (waki-honjin)
- Unuma-juku (Kakamigahara, Gifu Prefecture) (waki-honjin)

Kōshū Kaidō:

- Hino-shuku (Hino, Tokyo)
- Ohara-shuku (Sagamihara, Kanagawa Prefecture)

Other Routes:

- Matsumaedō's Arikabe-shuku (Kurihara, Miyagi Prefecture)
- Mito Kaidō's Toride-shuku (Ibaraki, Ibaraki Prefecture)
- Saigoku Kaidō's Kōriyama-shuku (Ibaraki, Osaka Prefecture)
- San'yōdō's Yakage-shuku (Yakage, Okayama Prefecture) (honjin and waki-honjin)
- Yamato Kaidō's Nate-shuku (Kinokawa, Wakayama Prefecture)

== See also ==
- Toiyaba
- Hatago
- Chaya
- Kōsatsu
