= Shinano Ichirizuka =

- 品濃一里塚 (Japanese)
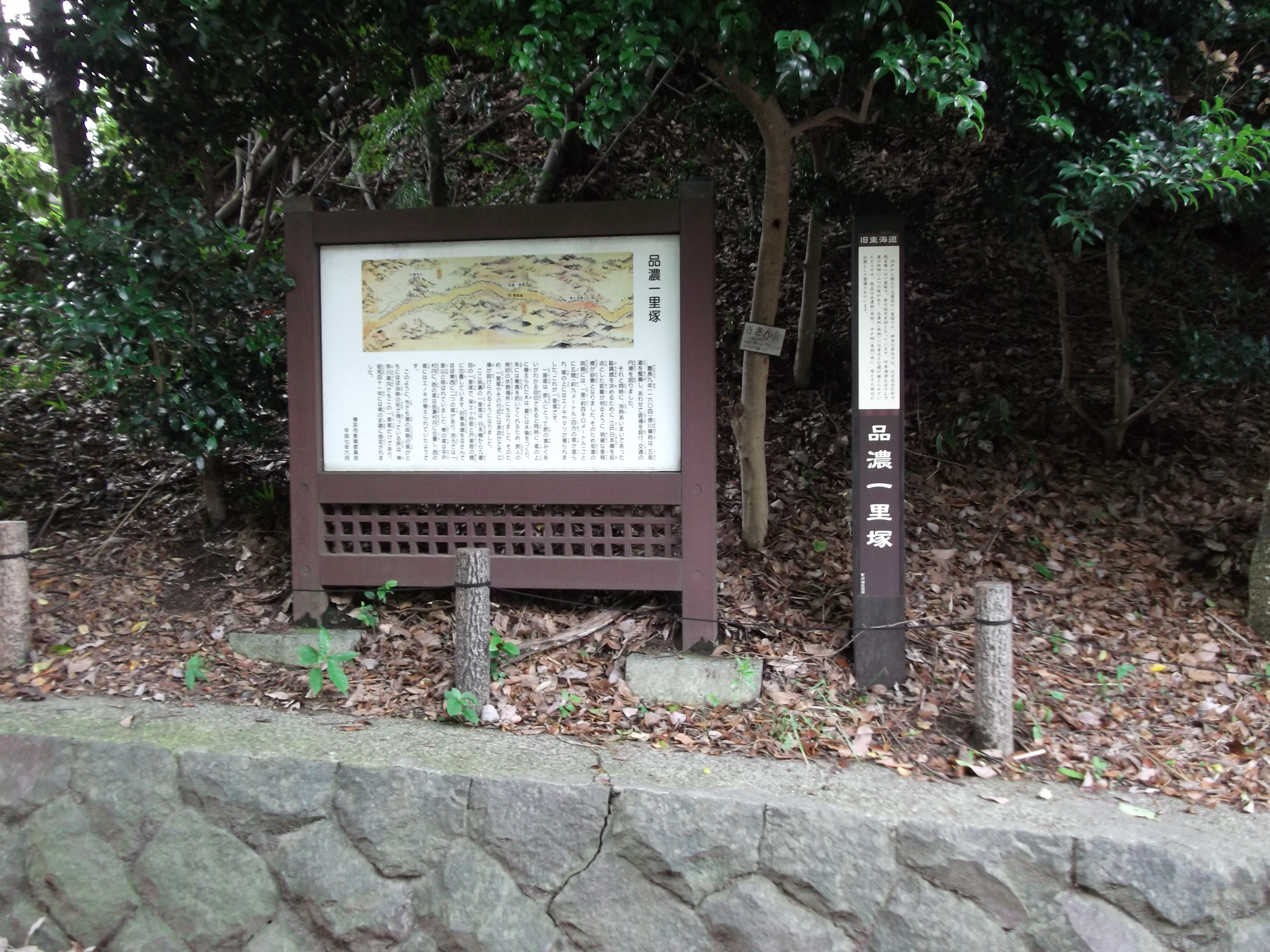
- Shinano Ichirizuka

- Shinano Ichirizuka Shinano Ichirizuka (Japan)
- Interactive map of Shinano Ichirizuka
- 35°25′57.2″N 139°33′52.0″E
- Periods: Edo period
- Location: Hiratsuka, Kanagawa, Japan
- Region: Kantō region

Site notes
- Public access: Yes
- Kanagawa Prefecture Historic Site

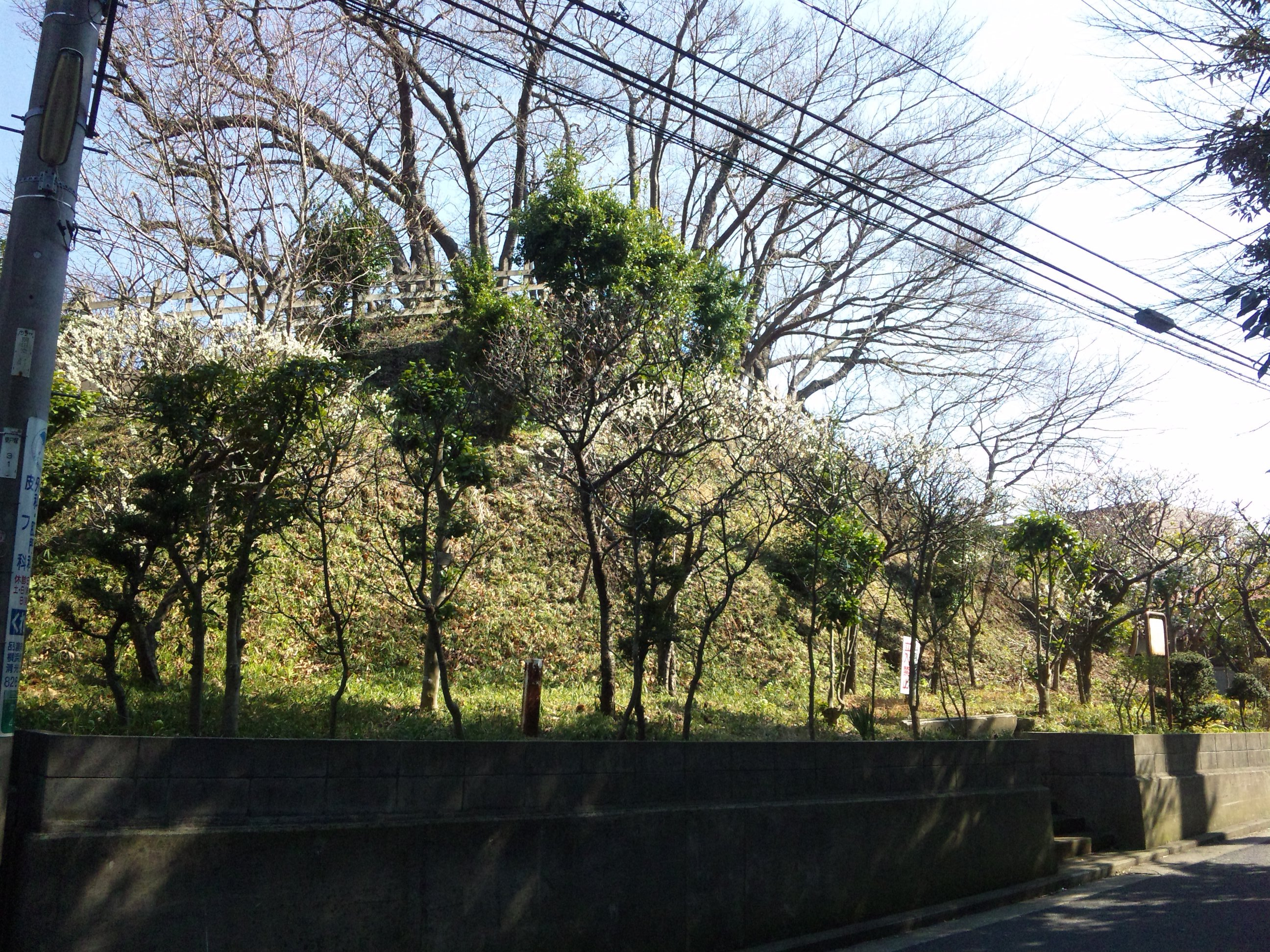
Shinano Ichirizuka

The Shinano Ichirizuka (品濃一里塚) is a historic Japanese distance marker akin to a milestone, comprising a pair of earthen mounds located in what is now part of Totsuka-ku, Yokohama, Kanagawa Prefecture in the Kantō region of Japan. It was designated a Kanagawa Prefecture Historic Site in 1966.

== Overview ==
During the Edo period the Tokugawa shogunate established ichirizuka on major roads, enabling calculation both of distance travelled and of the charge for transportation by kago or palanquin. These mounds denoted the distance in ri (3.927 kilometres (2.440 mi)) to Nihonbashi, the "Bridge of Japan", erected in Edo in 1603. They were typically planted with an enoki or Japanese red pine to provide shelter for travelers. Since the Meiji period, most of the ichirizuka have disappeared, having been destroyed by the elements, modern highway construction and urban encroachment. In 1876, the "Ichirizuka Abolition decree" was issued by the Meiji government and many were demolished at that time. Currently, 17 surviving ichirizuka are designated as national historic sites.

In the case of the Shinano Ichirizuka, the mounds flank the Tōkaidō, one of the Edo Five Routes and the main connection between Edo and Kyoto. The Shinano Ichirizuka is the ninth milestone from Nihonbashi, the starting point of the Tōkaidō road, and is located almost midway between Hodogaya-juku and Totsuka-juku. Two mounds were erected on either side of the old Tōkaidō road, which runs north-south on a hilltop. The eastern mound belonged to Hirado Village, and the western mound belonged to Shinano Village.

The current surface of the old Tōkaidō road has been lowered than before, creating a cut-through, resulting in a difference in elevation between the two milestones. However, the Shinano Ichirizuka is the only one in Kanagawa Prefecture where mounds remain on both sides of the road almost unchanged from their original form. The western mound is now "Shinano Ichirizuka Park", and the eastern mound is now "Ichirizuka Park".

The Shinano Ichirizuka is about 850 meters east of Higashi-Totsuka Station on the JR East Tōkaidō Main Line.

== See also ==
- List of Historic Sites of Japan (Kanagawa)
