= Nirayama Daikansho =

Nirayama daikansho
- 韮山代官所
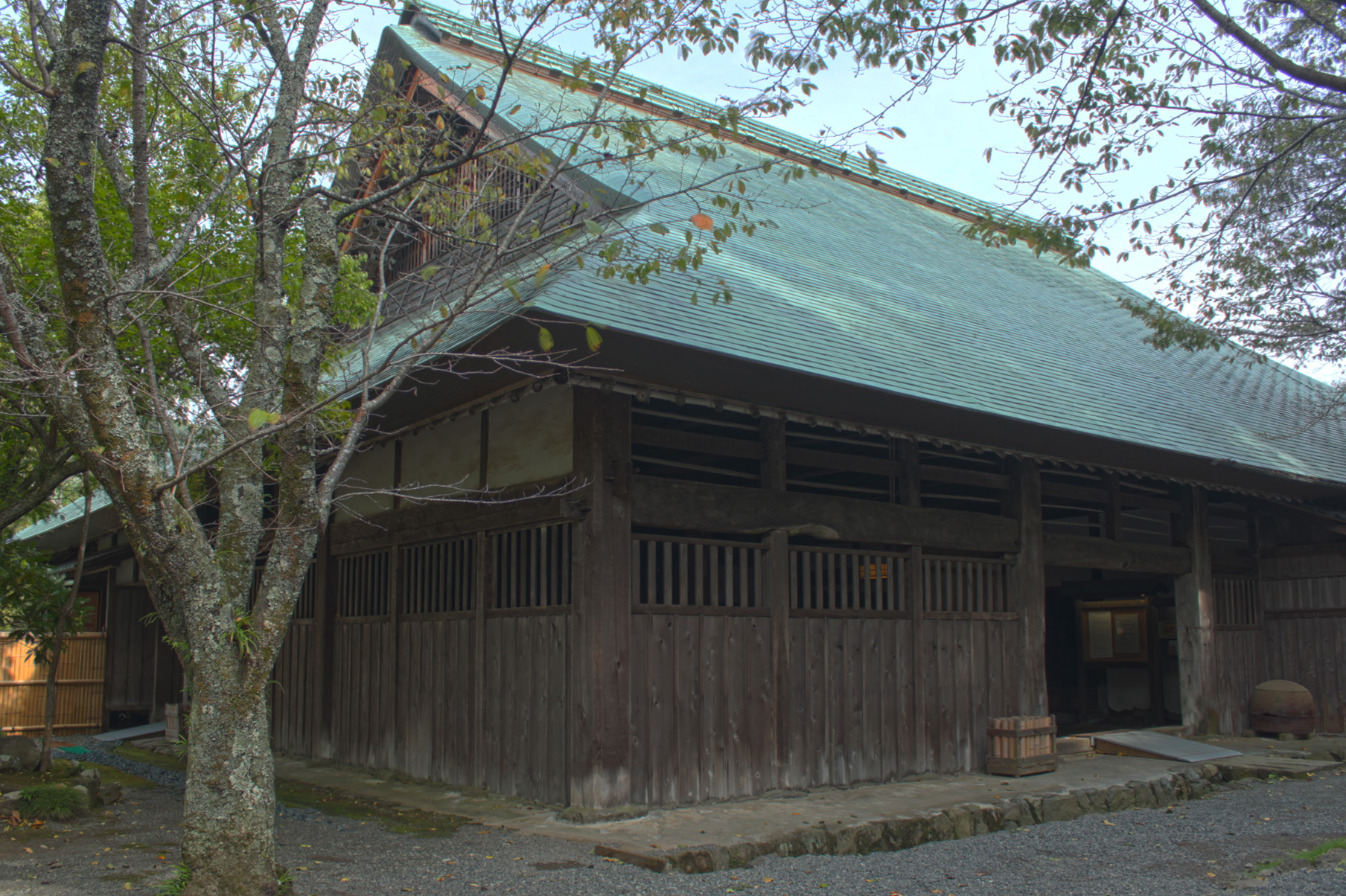
- Nirayama daikansho

- Location within Shizuoka Prefecture Location within Japan

General information
- Architectural style: Giyōfū
- Location: Izunokuni, Shizuoka, Japan, Japan
- Coordinates: 35°3′16.6″N 138°57′33.2″E

The Nirayama daikansho (韮山代官所) was an Edo period administrative center for the tenryō territories in eastern Japan under the direct control of the Tokugawa shogunate. It was located in what is now part of the city of Izunokuni in the Tōkai region of Japan. There were once many daikansho located in various parts of Japan serving a similar function, and this is one of the few which remains relatively intact. It was designated a National Historic Site of Japan in 2004.

== Overview ==
The Nirayama daikansho administered all of Izu Province (which was completely tenryō territory), as well as large portions of Suruga, Sagama and Musashi Provinces, as well as a portion of Kai Province and the Izu islands. Its kokudaka fluctuated at several points in its history, but was estimated to be at around 50,000 to 100,000 koku. The office of daikan was hereditary to the Egawa clan (except for a period from 1723 to 1758), and was regarded as equivalent to that of a hatamoto. The head of the Egawa clan always took the name of Egawa Tarō Uzaemon. The Egawa were a samurai clan who claimed descent from the Seiwa Genji who controlled central Izu since the Heian period. Similar to the daimyō, they also maintained a residence in Edo (located in Honjō). However, unlike the daimyō, they were not subject to the sankin kōtai requirement, but alternated residence between Edo in summer and Nirayama in winter. As the shogunal territories under their administration were scattered across a wide area, secondary offices were established at various locations for administrative and tax collection purposes.

In 1596, Tokugwa Ieyasu appointed Egawa Hidenaga (1560-1639) as daikan of half of Izu Province, with the remainder placed under the Mishima daikansho. The two offices were united to form the Nirayama daikansho in 1633. However, in 1723, Egawa Hidekatsu was found guilty of embezzling public funds intended for repairs to the Tōkaidō at Totsuka-juku and was relieved of his office. The clan regained the post in 1758; however, its scope of authority after this date was limited only to Izu Province, which it continued to govern until the Meiji restoration. In the Bakumatsu period, Egawa Hidetatsu played a leading role in the shogunate's efforts to modernize its military against the threat posed by the Western imperialist powers, and was responsible for the construction of the nearby Nirayama Reverberatory Furnace for the production of cannons.

== Important Cultural Properties ==
The Egawa residence complex was designated an Important Cultural Property on May 14, 1958. Attached buildings such as gates and gardens were added to the collective designation from December 9, 1993. Also covered by Imperial Cultural Property designations are 38,581 documents and 461 old photographs.

Egawa house complex (7 buildings)

- Main house
- Shoin
- Chapel
- East Kura
- Fertilizer warehouse
- Armoury
- Front gate

Japanese garden

- 12,302.46 square meters of landscaped grounds, including ponds and wells

Documents

- Construction drawings and records of repairs
- Daiskansho records (33,663 items)
- Printed Books (430 volumes)
- Chinese/Japanese Books (3507 volumes)
- Translated documents (366 items)
- Foreign Books (144 volumes)
- Calligraphy Books (142 volumes)
- Old Photographs (461 items)

Other

- Weapons and armor (41 items)
- Boxes and containers (288 items)

== Gallery ==
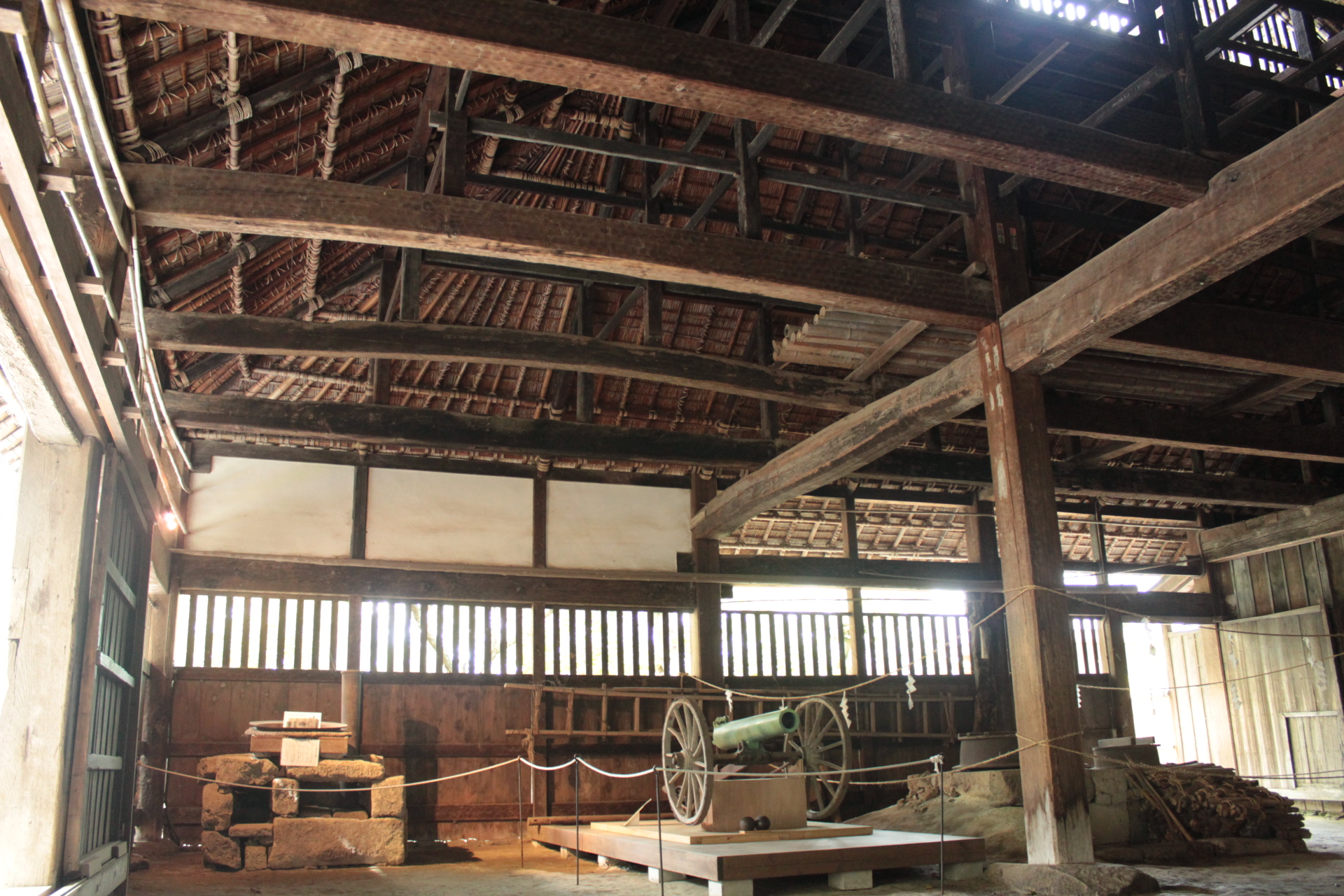
Floor of Egawa residence

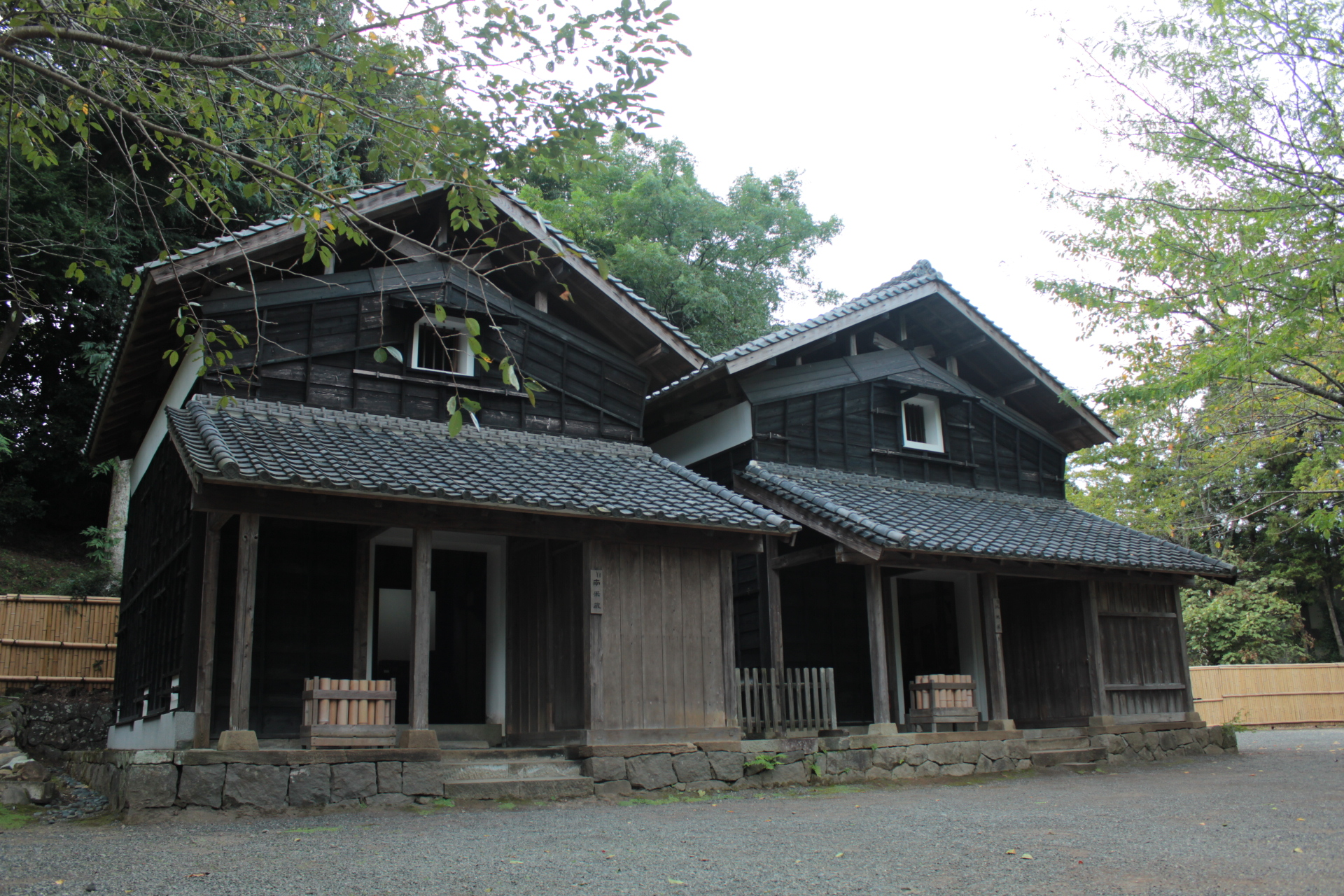
North and South Rice Warehouses

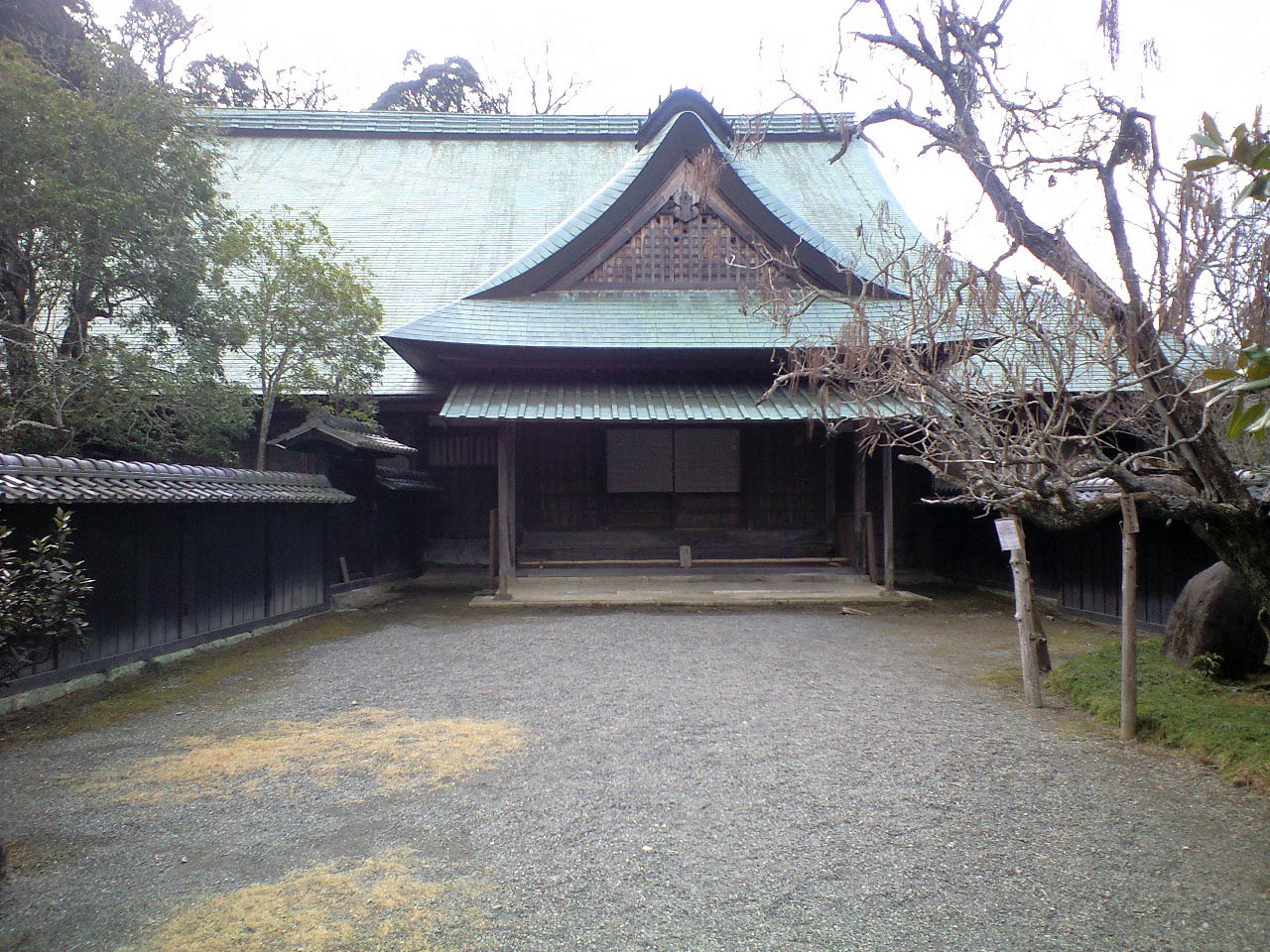
Egawa residence

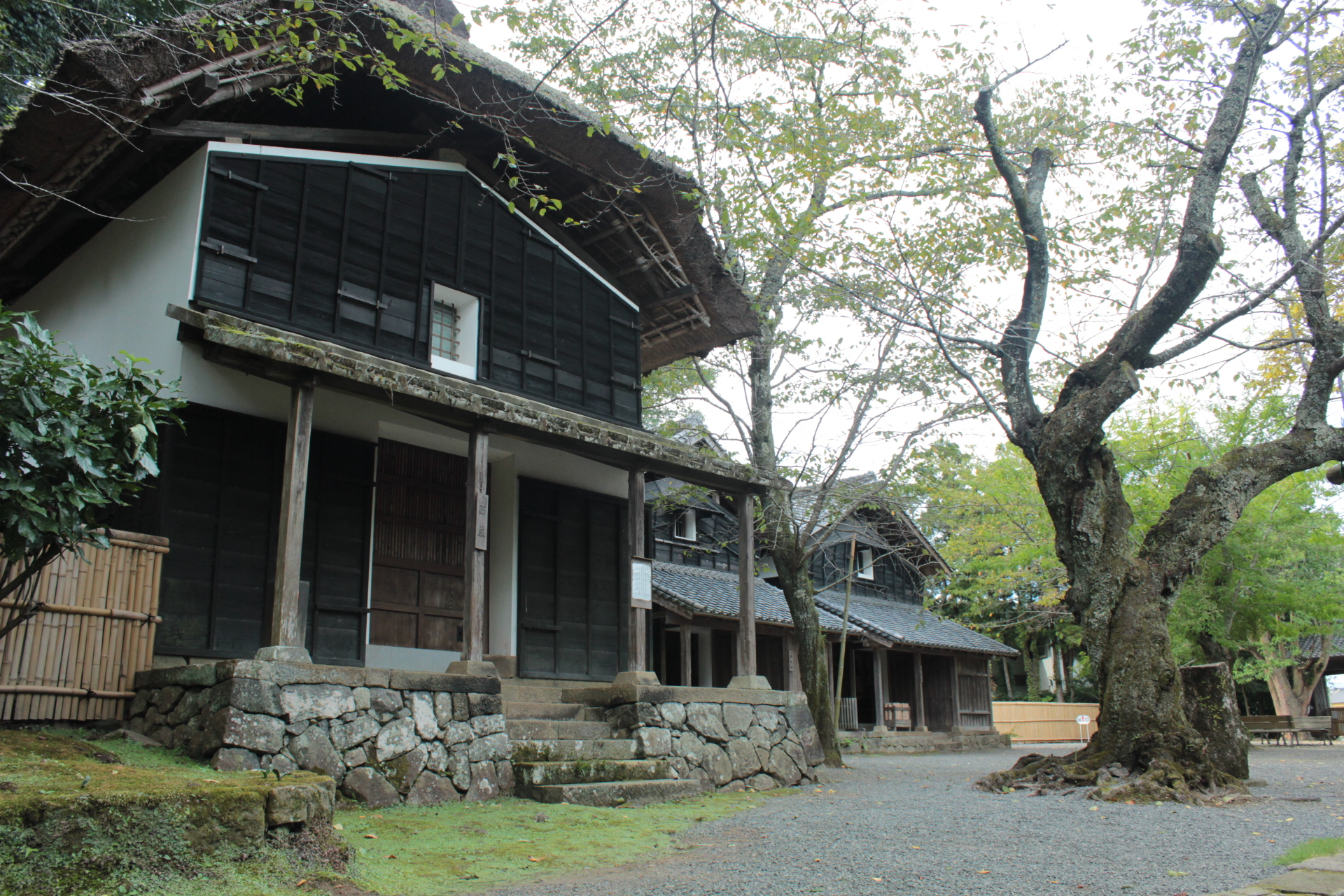
Ferttilizer Warehouse

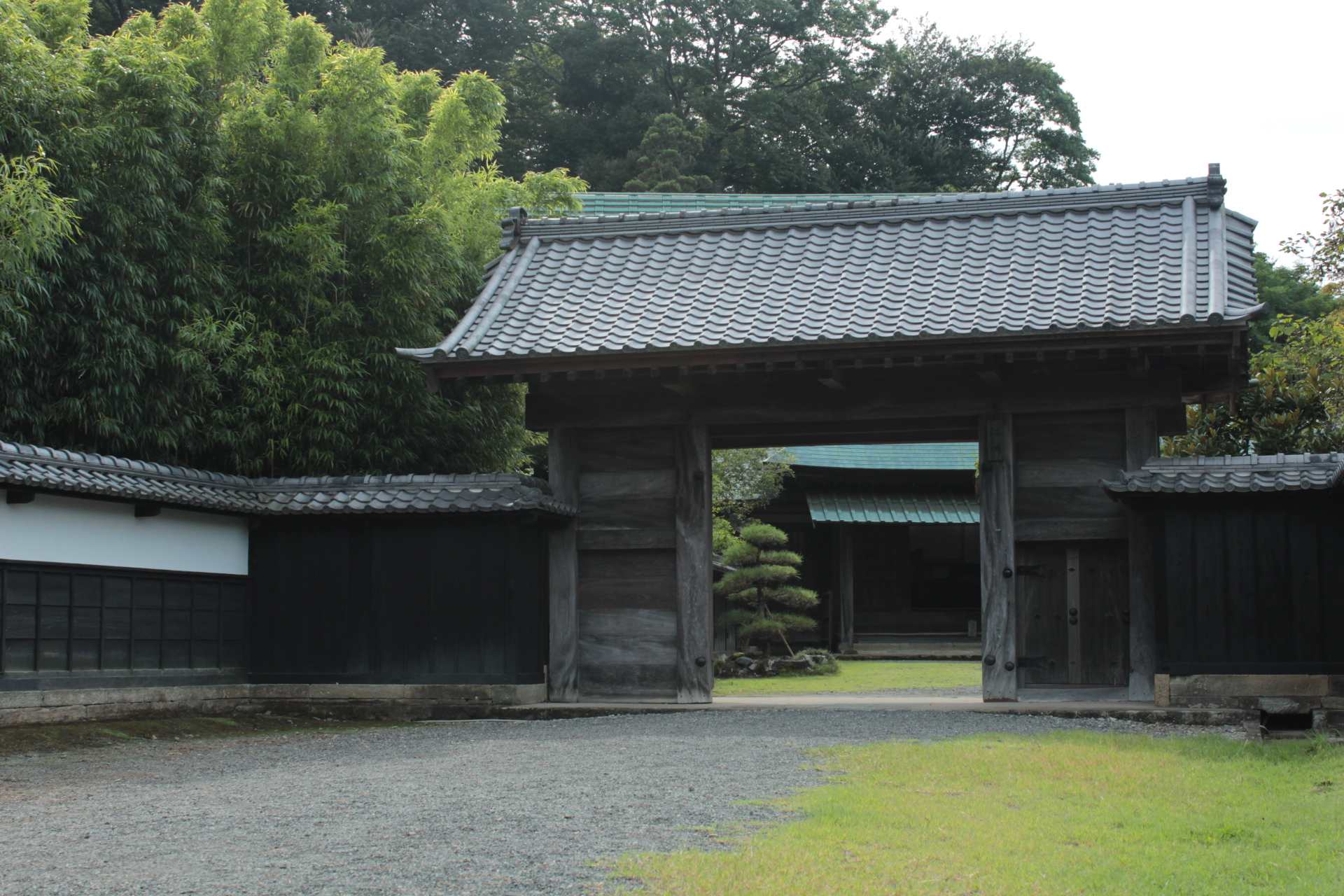
Front Gate

== See also ==
- List of Historic Sites of Japan (Shizuoka)
