= Izunokuni History Museum IZUSHIRU =

Museum in Izunokuni, Shizuoka, Japan

- 伊豆の国歴史館いずしる
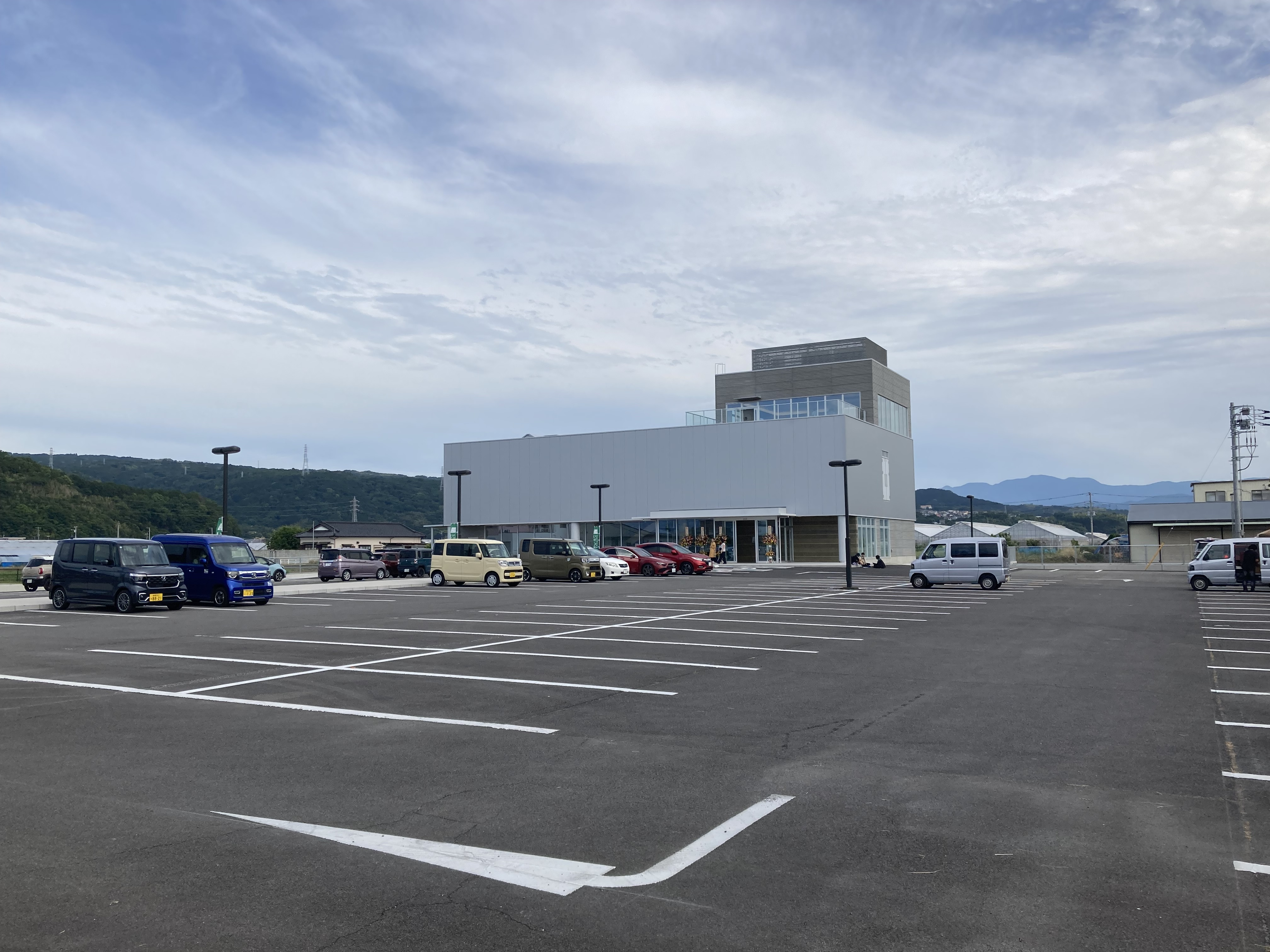
- Interactive map of the Izunokuni History Museum IZUSHIRU area

General information
- Location: 800-1 Yokka-machi, Izunokuni, Shizuoka Prefecture, Japan
- Coordinates: 35°03′02″N 138°56′48″E
- Opened: 31 May 2026

Website
- Official website (in Japanese)

Izunokuni History Museum IZUSHIRU (伊豆の国歴史館いずしる, Izunokuni Rekishikan Izushiru) opened in Izunokuni, Shizuoka Prefecture, Japan, in 2026. The permanent display covers the area's geology and topography and is then organized thematically around five main historical phases, from the beginnings of human life in the region, through mediaeval times, the Sengoku period, and Edo bakufu, to the dawn of modern Japan.

== See also ==
- Shizuoka Prefectural Museum of Art
- Nirayama Reverberatory Furnace
- Izu Province
