= Yokohama Dreamland =

Former Japanese amusement park

- Interactive map of Yokohama Dreamland
- Location: Totsuka-ku, Yokohama
- Coordinates: 35.382976°N 139.495372°E
- Status: Defunct
- Opened: August 1, 1964
- Closed: February 17, 2002
- Owner: Daiei (former Nippon Dream Kanko)
- Operated by: Dreampark
- General manager: Kunizo Matsuo

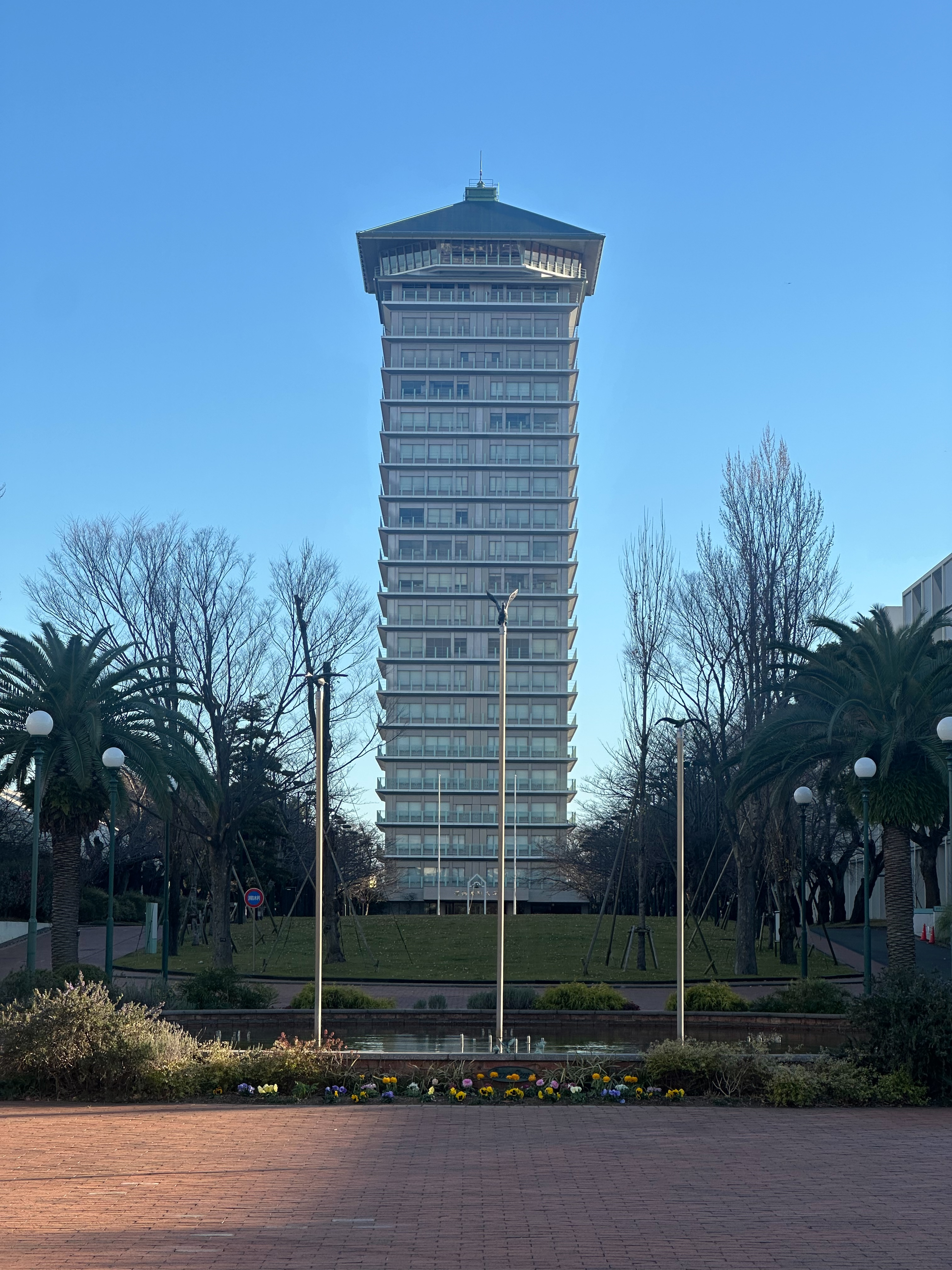
The former Hotel Empire building, now the academic library of the Yokohama College of Pharmacy.

Yokohama Dreamland was an amusement park that operated in Totsuka, Yokohama, Japan from 1964 to 2002. The management company, Japan Dream Tourism, was acquired by the supermarket chain Daiei in 1993, and the amusement park closed permanently on February 17, 2002, due to financial issues. At the time of its closing, the amusement park was downsized to 145,776 square metres (170,000 yd^{2}). It was the sister park to Nara Dreamland, which itself closed permanently four years later.

Beginning in May 1966, the park was served by the Yokohama Dreamland Monorail from Ōfuna Station. In September 1967, however, service on the line was suspended, due to structural issues resulting from engineering problems encountered in its construction. The closure was expected to be temporary, but a protracted legal battle over responsibility for the monorail's problems ensued, during which its infrastructure deteriorated significantly. After subsequent failed attempts to resurrect the line, it finally began to be demolished in 2003.

In 2005, the Ministry of Education, Culture, Sports, Science and Technology allowed the newly established Yokohama College of Pharmacy to occupy the site of the former amusement park. This involved converting the former Hotel Empire building and nearby existing structures into an academic library, classrooms and labs respectively, with additional structures, amenities and green spaces added later on.

== Data ==
- Opening hours: 10:00–17:00 (March to November), 10:00–16:00 (January, February and December)
- Entrance fee: ¥800 (adults), ¥400 (children)
- Mascots: Dori-chan, Ran-chan
