= Kanagawa-juku =

Third of the 53 stations of the Tōkaidō in Japan

Coordinates: 35°28′30″N 139°37′59″E

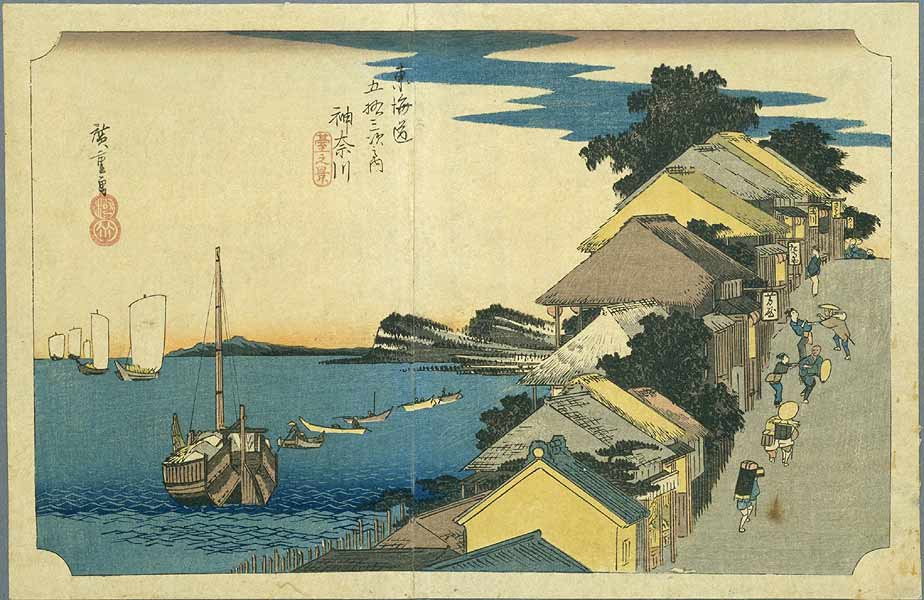
Kanagawa-juku in the 1830s, as depicted by Hiroshige in The Fifty-three Stations of the Tōkaidō

Kanagawa-juku (神奈川宿, Kanagawa-juku) was the third of the fifty-three stations of the Tōkaidō. It was located in Kanagawa-ku in the present-day city of Yokohama, Kanagawa Prefecture, Japan. It was close to Kanagawa Port. Many of its historical artifacts were destroyed by the Great Kantō earthquake and bombings during World War II.

== History ==
Kanagawa-juku was established parallel to Kanagawa Port and it flourished as part of the route that goods traveled on the way to Sagami Province. Though the area had officially been designated as the place for the port to be opened, it was actually opened on the opposite shore in what is now Naka-ku, Yokohama.

After the country was opened to international trade, the center of commerce was moved to the opposite shore as well. In 1889, the town of Kanagawa was established, and it eventually merged into Yokohama in 1901.

== Neighboring post towns ==
Tōkaidō
Kawasaki-juku - Kanagawa-juku - Hodogaya-juku
