= Yokohama Dreamland Monorail =

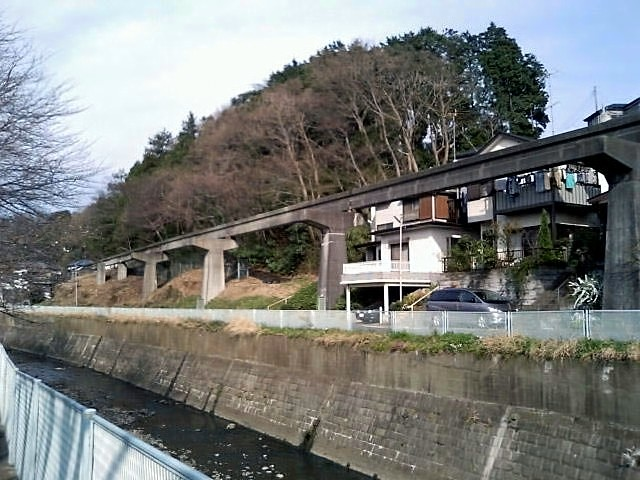
- A section of track from the Dreamland Monorail in 2004

Overview
- Other name: Dream Development Dreamland Line
- Native name: ドリームランドモノレール
- Status: abandoned
- Locale: Kamakura, Kanagawa
- Termini: Yokohama Dreamland; Ōfuna Station
- Stations: 2

Service
- Type: monorail
- Operator(s): Dream Transport

History
- Opened: May 1966
- Closed: September 1967

Technical
- Line length: 5.3 km (3.3 mi)
- Electrification: 1500 V

The Yokohama Dreamland Monorail (ドリームランドモノレール), formally the Dream Development Dreamland Line (ドリーム開発ドリームランド線, Dorĩmu Kaihatsu Dorĩmurando Sen) was a monorail connecting the Yokohama Dreamland amusement park to Ōfuna Station in Kamakura, Kanagawa, Japan. Operational for barely over a year between May 1966 and September 1967, various attempts to restart or rebuild the line continued for 35 years, until it was finally decommissioned in 2002.

== History ==
Toshiba Monorail advertisement celebrating the opening of the monorail, 1966

Opened in August 1964, Yokohama Dreamland was Japan's first large-scale, modern amusement park and an instant hit. However, the amusement park was notably inconvenient to access, with the park being over 5 km away from the Ofuna Station, which was the closest station to the park. The hilly terrain made it difficult for any standard railways to be constructed, resulting in a monorail line being planned. A mere two years later, in May 1966, the Yokohama Dreamland Monorail was opened to the public, offering an 8-minute ride from Ofuna station to the park. Despite a steep fare (at the time) of ¥170, the line was initially a hit, and with significant population growth in the area, plans were soon made to add an intermediate infill station and extend the line to Mutsuai Station on the Odakyu Enoshima Line.

However, cracks soon started appearing in the monorail beam. The developers had been unable to buy the necessary land along the original route, forcing the route of the monorail to be changed, resulting in steep grades of as much as 10%. The monorail vehicles were altered to cope with the high grades, increasing their weight, but the strength of the beam was not increased to match. It soon became clear that the beam was simply not strong enough to withstand these additional stresses safely, and in September 1967, the service was suspended after a strong demand from the Ministry of Land, Infrastructure, Transport and Tourism despite operating for only a year and four months.

Operator Dream Transport and constructor Toshiba promptly started debating who was responsible for the whole debacle, with mediation dragging on for 14 years until a settlement was finally reached in 1981. However, the settlement did not lead to repairs, much less restarting operations, and eventually the unmaintained infrastructure started to fall apart, with the vehicles decommissioned in 1987, the electrical transmission lines in 1991 and Ofuna's monorail station in 1992.

Meanwhile, Yokohama Dreamland was purchased in 1988 by Japanese retail group Daiei, who decided to rebuild the line as a HSST maglev train. Planning started in earnest in 1995, with the line to be up and running by 1999. However, protests by local residents worried about electromagnetic radiation, as well as the high costs associated with the new technology, led to this plan being scuppered in 2001. Daiei proposed a conventional small monorail instead, but the continuing fallout of the bursting of the Japanese asset bubble and Daiei's subsequent economic difficulties meant that they did not have the capital necessary to build this. Yokohama Dreamland was closed on February 17, 2002, and on August 21 of the same year, with no financial support forthcoming from the City of Yokohama, Daiei announced that they intended to abandon the line once and for all.

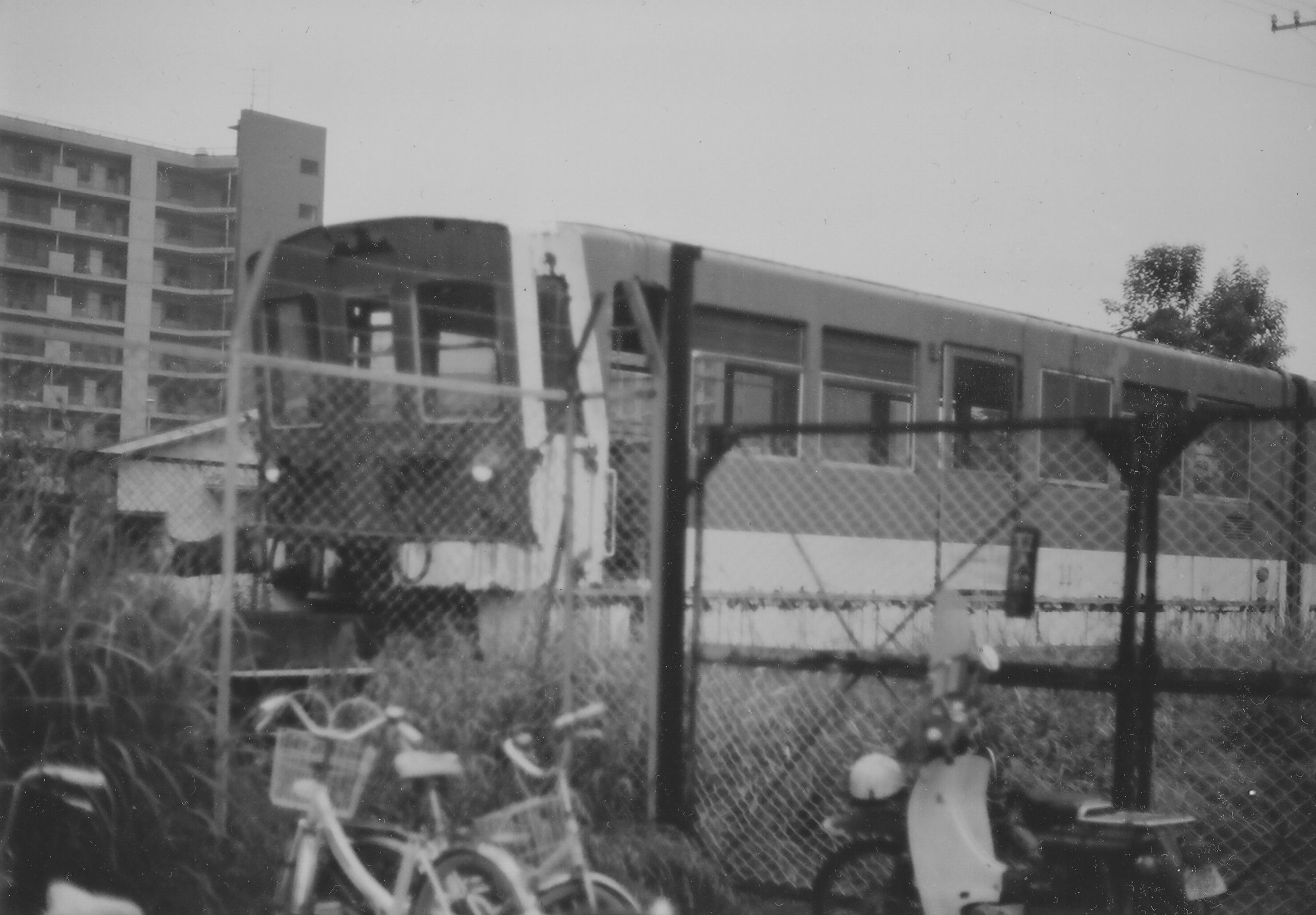
Parked Dreamland monorail (1984)

Most of the remnants of the line were demolished by early 2005. Dreamland Station is now a parking lot, while the site of the Ofuna station has been turned into an apartment block. Some segments of the track itself still remain.

== Infrastructure ==
The line used the "Toshiba-style" method, which used Jacobs bogie to allow steep curves. This method was advertised by Toshiba as "Toshiba's unique technology evolved from technologies in Japan". However, this method was criticized for being similar to Alweg's monorails, with an identical look compared to them.

== Legacy ==
Many of the lessons learned were applied to the Shonan Monorail, opened in 1970, which connects Ofuna to Shonan-Enoshima Station and is still operational.
