= Yokohama College of Pharmacy =

Coordinates: 35°22′59″N 139°29′44″E

- 横浜薬科大学; Yokohama yakka daigaku
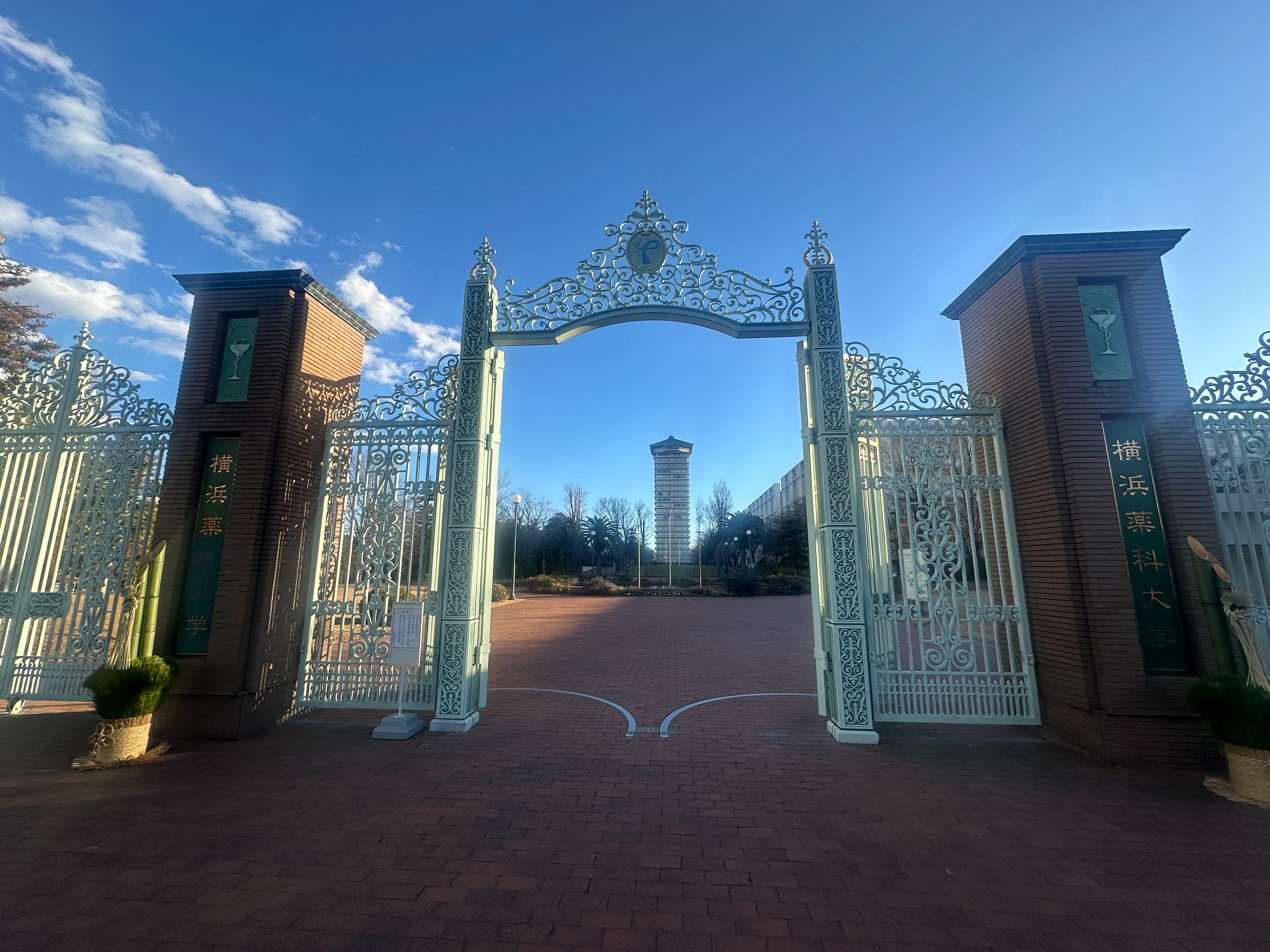
- Type: Private
- Established: 1989
- President: Leo Esaki
- Location: Totsuka-ku, Yokohama, Kanagawa, Japan
- Website: Official website

Yokohama College of Pharmacy (横浜薬科大学, Yokohama yakka daigaku) is a private university in Totsuka-ku, Yokohama, Kanagawa Prefecture, Japan. It was established in 2006 on the site of the former Yokohama Dreamland amusement park, converting the existing hotel building into classrooms and a library. It was founded by Yasuhisa Tsuzuki and is operated by his company, the Tsuzuki Integrated Educational Institution. The college's president is Nobel-prize laureate Leo Esaki.
