= Koito Manufacturing =

Japanese industrial company

Koito Manufacturing Co., Ltd.
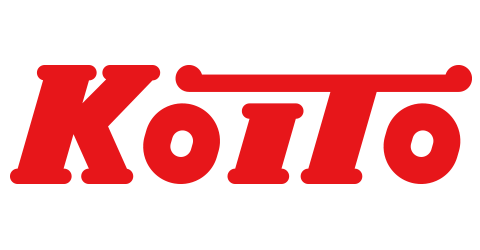

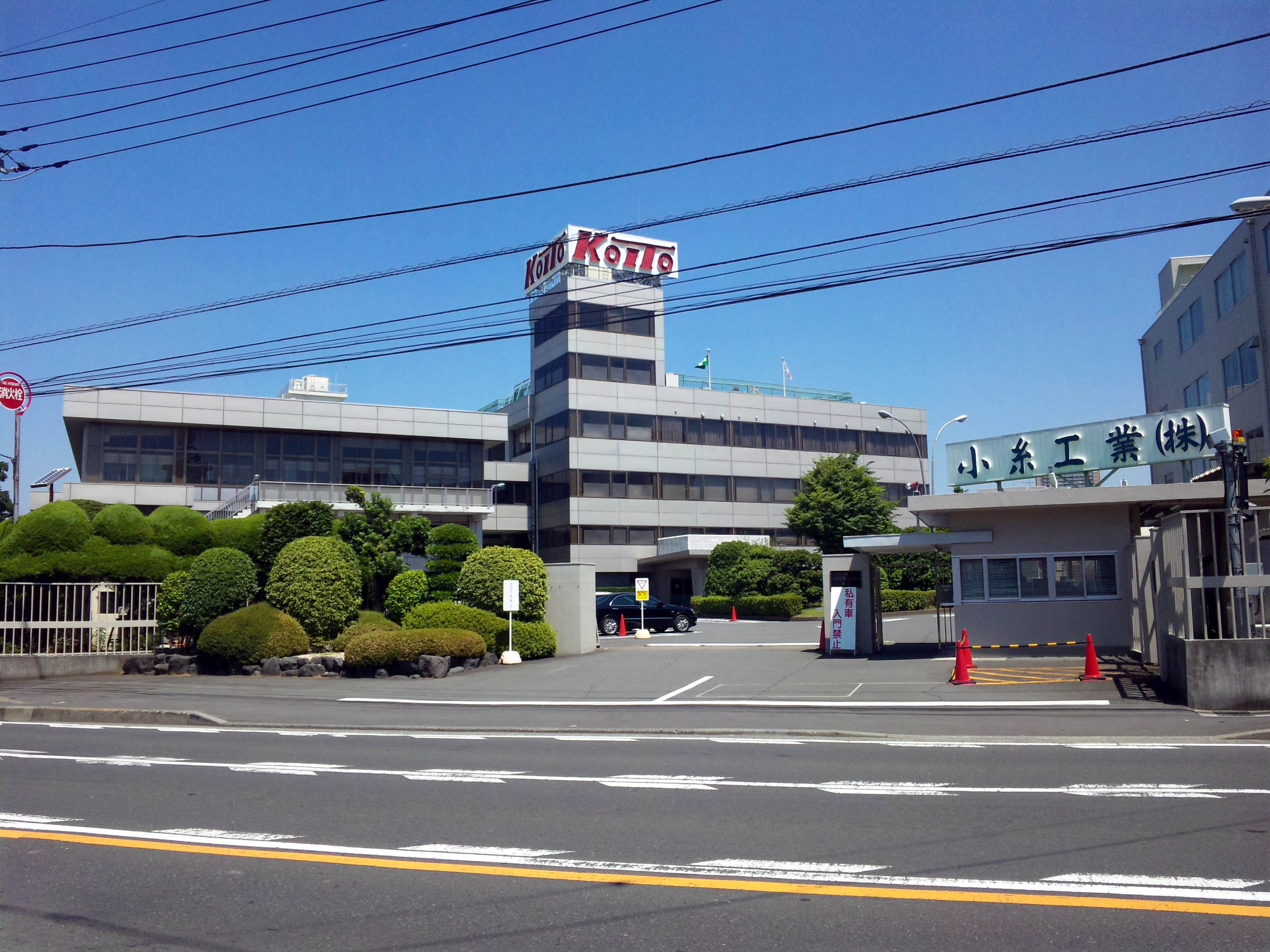
- Headquarters in Totsuka-ku
- Native name: 株式会社小糸製作所
- Romanized name: Kabushiki-gaisha Koito Seisakusho
- Type: Kabushiki gaisha
- Traded as: TYO: 7276
- Industry: Conglomerate
- Founded: April 1, 1915; 111 years ago
- Founder: Genrokurō Koito
- Headquarters: Totsuka-ku, Yokohama, Japan
- Key people: Hitoshi Hirose (CEO)
- Products: Lighting, display, and signalling equipment Environmental control systems
- Number of employees: 2,087 (Consolidated, as of March 2011)
- Subsidiaries: KI Holdings
- Website: koito-ind.co.jp/english/

Koito Manufacturing Co., Ltd. (株式会社小糸製作所, Kabushiki-gaisha Koito Seisakusho) is a conglomerate headquartered in Totsuka Ward, Yokohama, Kanagawa Prefecture, Japan. The company's primary products are lighting and electronic display systems for outdoor installations and rolling stock.

== History ==
Koito was founded on 1 April 1915 as the Genrokurō Koito Shop (小糸源六郎商店, Koito Genrokurō Shoten), which began producing and selling Fresnel lenses for railway signal lights. In April of 1936, the company was reorganized as Koito Manufacturing Co. In September of 1947, the company was re-established as Naigai Trading Co., Ltd. (内外商事株式会社, Naigai Shōji Kabushiki-gaisha) and renamed to Koito Trading the following July. Another name change in May of 1957 saw Koito Trading become Koito Industries; that October, the company began producing glass-lensed sealed beam headlamps.

Between 1971 and 1982, Koito would begin manufacturing various lighting products, including lights for small watercraft and automotive halogen lamps. In 1988, the company was listed on the second section of the Tokyo Stock Exchange.

On 1 August 2011, Koito Industries became KI Holdings, spinning off all businesses besides airline seats as Koito Electric. In 2019, KI Holdings became a wholly owned subsidiary of Koito Manufacturing and was delisted from the second section of the Tokyo Stock Exchange. KI Holdings was absorbed into Koito Manufacturing in 2020.

== Products ==
Koito produces many traffic lighting systems, such as signals and sign boards. The company also manufacturers appliances such as hand dryers, many of which are produced for Toto.

=== Airline seats ===
Koito manufactured seats for commercial aircraft from 1959, but in February 2010 received a business improvement recommendation from the Japanese Ministry of Land, Infrastructure, and Transport. In June 2011, the new KI Holdings took measures in response to an airworthiness improvement order issued by the Federal Aviation Administration and European Union Aviation Safety Agency.

=== Railway equipment ===
Koito Manufacturing, alongside affiliated company Okayama Sangyo, manufactures seats for railway cars, including the dual seats on the Keio 5000 series and Tokyu 6020 series.

Along with Morio Electric, Koito Manufacturing holds a large share of destination signage, master controllers and destination display devices for the railway industry. The company also manufactures interior LED lighting for trains and the "Patto Vision" (パッとビジョン, Patto Bijon) in-car information display.

== Airline seat controversy ==
In February 2010, Koito Industries faced backlash from the Ministry of Land, Infrastructure and Transport of Japan regarding its airline seats. The company was allegedly involved in a seat test falsification, with claims that they omitted part of a test process and used figures from past tests. Koito attributed their actions to "heavy number of orders coming and tight scheduling." Over 150,000 seats installed in over 1,000 Airbus and Boeing planes owned by 32 airlines in 24 countries were affected, causing delays to some aircraft deliveries such as All Nippon Airways' new Inspiration of Japan seats, particularly the premium economy seats.

Before the scandal, Airbus had banned Koito from delivering seats manufactured for Airbus aircraft since September 2009 because of safety violations. As of July 2010, Boeing no longer allowed airlines to fit Koito seats in new aircraft.
