= Fujisawa-shuku =

Sixth of the 53 stations of the Tōkaidō in Japan

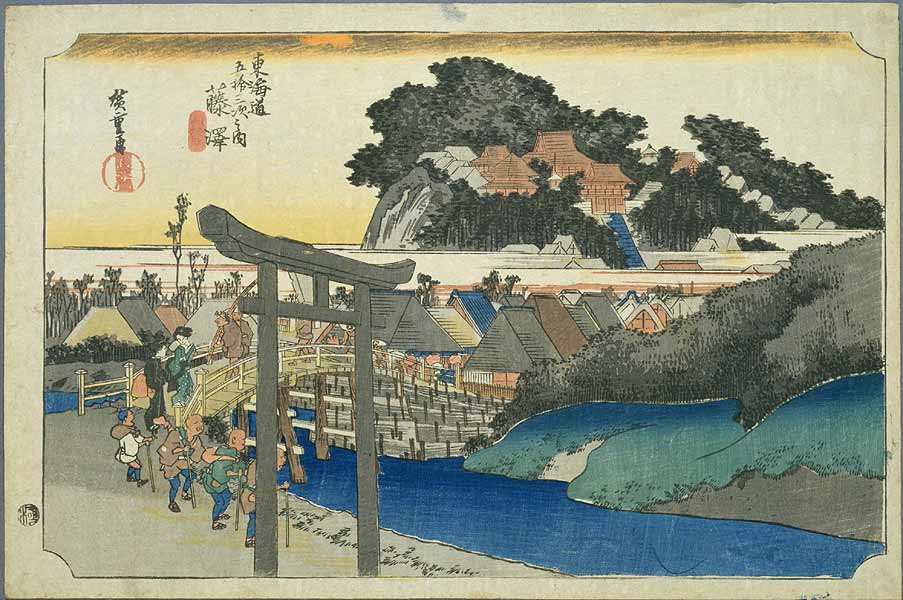
Fujisawa-shuku in the 1830s, as depicted by Hiroshige in The Fifty-three Stations of the Tōkaidō

Fujisawa-shuku (藤沢宿, Fujisawa-shuku) was the sixth of the fifty-three stations of the Tōkaidō. It is located in the present-day city of Fujisawa, Kanagawa Prefecture, Japan.

== History ==
Fujisawa-shuku was established as a post station on the Tōkaidō in 1601, but did not become the sixth post station until Totsuka-juku was later established. Before the establishment of the Tōkaidō, Fujisawa flourished as a “temple town” (門前町, monzen-machi) for Shōjōkō-ji, also known as "Yugyō-ji" (Japanese: 遊行寺), the head temple of the Ji-sect of Japanese Buddhism. It was also located on a fork along the Odawara Kaidō, which connected Odawara Castle and its two supporting castles, Edo Castle and Hachiōji Castle during the period of the Late Hōjō clan. The gate of post station (見附, mitsuke) toward Edo was to the east of Yugyō-ji, and the gate towards Kyoto was on the western side of the modern Odakyū Enoshima Line; these boundaries mark the general limits of Fujisawa-juku.

It was said that there were over 1,000 buildings in the post town, including honjin, hatago, etc. Up until 1745, the honjin for Fujisawa-shuku was the Horiuchi Honjin, but after that, the Maita Honjin was used. At the temple of Eishō-ji (永勝寺), there are a number of graves of the meshimori onna who worked at the local hatago.

The Fujisawa Palace (藤沢御殿, Fujisawa Goten) was built at Fujisawa-shuku in the early days of the Tokugawa Shogunate. The first three Shōgun (Tokugawa Ieyasu, Tokugawa Hidetada and Tokugawa Iemitsu stayed at this palace on a total of some 30 occasions. Records indicate that it was a large structure, measuring 106 x 32 bays, and was surrounded by a wide moat. It was located next to the Fujisawa daikansho, which is now between the present-day Fujisawa Municipal Hall and the Fujisawa Municipal Hospital. It was dismantled and moved to Edo after the Great Fire of Meireki in 1657 and its materials were used to rebuild part of the Shōgunal palace at Edo Castle.

The classic ukiyo-e print by Andō Hiroshige (Hōeidō edition) from 1831–1834 depicts a village with a bridge. In the background is the temple of Yugyō-ji on a hill, and in the foreground is a torii with a path leading to Enoshima. The bridge is crowded with pilgrims, and four blind men, apparently on their way to the Enoshima Benten Shrine are following each other alongside a stream.

== Neighboring post towns ==
Tōkaidō
Totsuka-juku - Fujisawa-shuku - Hiratsuka-juku
