= Nirayama Reverberatory Furnace =

UNESCO World Heritage Site
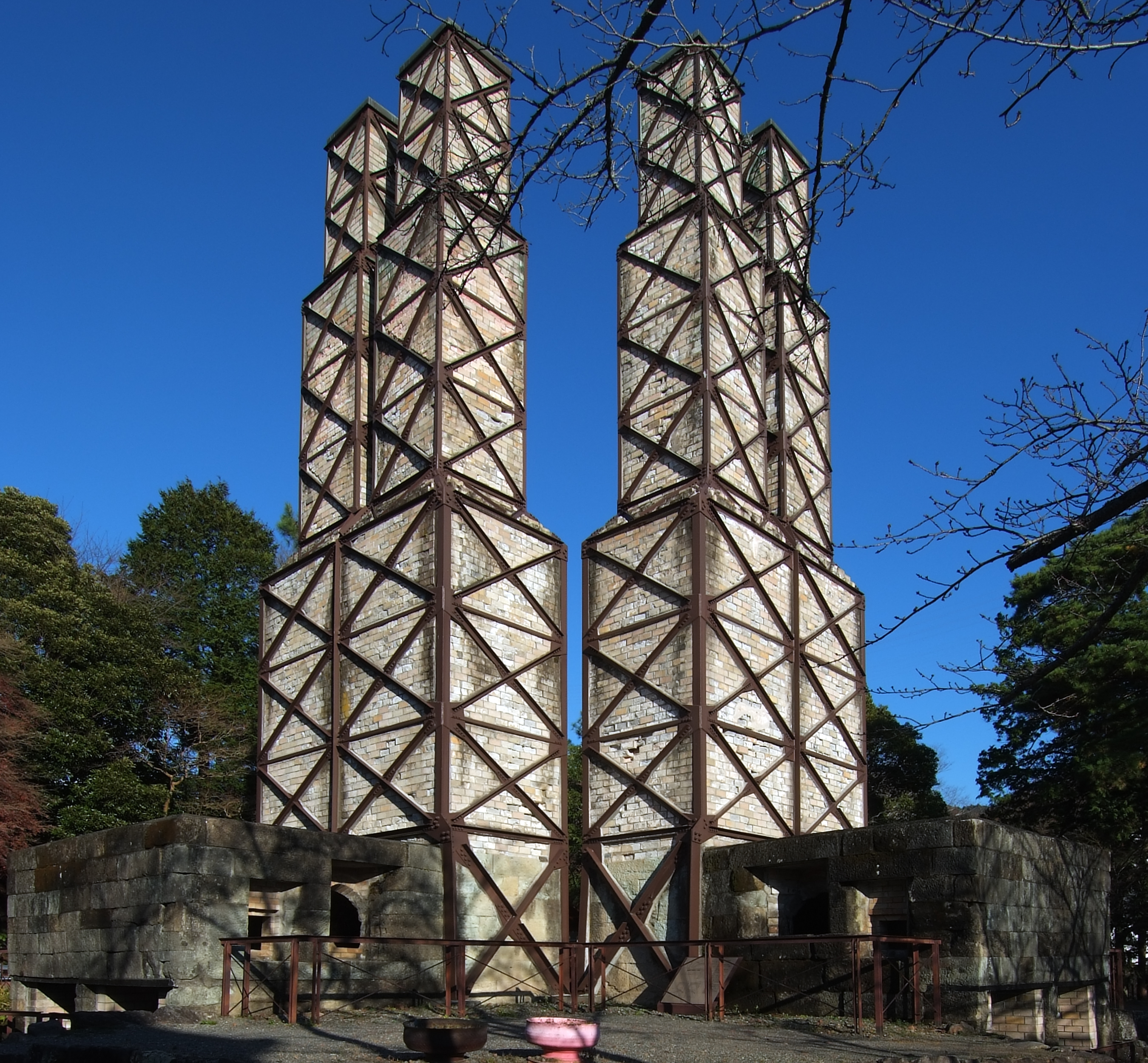
- Nirayama Reverberatory Furnaces

- Location within Shizuoka Prefecture Location within Japan
- Location: Izunokuni, Shizuoka, Japan
- Part of: Sites of Japan's Meiji Industrial Revolution: Iron and Steel, Shipbuilding and Coal Mining
- Criteria: Cultural: (ii), (iv)
- Reference: 1484
- Inscription: 2015 (39th Session)
- Area: 3,068 m^{2} (33,020 sq ft)
- Website: Official website
- Coordinates: 35°02′25″N 138°57′43″E
- National Historic Site of Japan

The Nirayama Reverberatory Furnaces (韮山反射炉, Nirayama hansharo) are a set of four Edo period reverberatory furnaces erected by the Tokugawa shogunate in what is now the Nirayama neighborhood of the city of Izunokuni, Shizuoka in the Tokai region of Japan. The site was designated a National Historic Site in 1922. and was later designed as a component of the Sites of Japan's Meiji Industrial Revolution: Iron and Steel, Shipbuilding and Coal Mining, which received UNESCO World Heritage Site status in 2015.

== Background ==
During the Bakumatsu period, the Tokugawa shogunate was increasingly alarmed by incursions by foreign warships into Japanese territorial waters, fearing that these kurofune warships would attempt to end the Japanese self-imposed national isolation policy by force, or would attempt an invasion of Japan by landing hostile military forces. Numerous feudal domains were ordered to establish fortifications along their coastlines with coastal artillery located at strategic locations, and the shogunate made belated attempts to modernize its armed forces with western weaponry.

Egawa Hidetatsu, daikan of the Nirayama Daikansho was assigned a leading role in the reinforcement of Japanese coastal defenses around Edo Bay in 1839. As early as 1842, Egawa attempted to build a furnace to cast cannon in the village of Nirayama in the Izu Peninsula. After sending a student to study the design of a furnace which had been developed in Saga Domain based on Dutch technology, construction of a reverberatory furnace and factory to cast cannon was begun in Shimoda in 1853. However, after an American sailor from the Perry Expedition trespassed on the site, it was relocated to the more isolated location of Nirayama. It was completed in 1855, the year of Egawa Hidetatsu's death, and work was continued by his son, Egawa Hidetoshi and completed in 1857. Egawa Hidetoshi was also an engineer, and had been involved in the construction of similar reverberatory furnace in Saga Domain, and he invited 11 engineers from Saga to assist in the project. The first cannon was cast in 1858 and the facility was used until 1864.

After being closed in 1864, it was purchased by the Egawa clan in 1868. In 1872 it was acquired by the Imperial Japanese Army, some repair work was undertaken from 1891 to 1908 by volunteers from Nirayama Village. After it became a National Historic Site in 1922, control was transferred to the Home Ministry with Nirayama municipality assuming responsibility for upkeep since 1957. In conjunction with the World Heritage Site designation, as museum, the Nirayama Reverberatory Furnace Guidance Center (韮山反射炉ガイダンスセンター, Nirayama hansha-ro gaidansusentā) was opened.

== Design ==
The facility consists of two pairs of furnaces, each made from refractory bricks made from clay from the Amagi Mountains, on a stone base of Izu green tuff, with a height of 15.7 meters. The surface of the chimney was finished with plaster at the time of construction. The design of the furnaces was taken from a Dutch book, Het Gietwezen in's Rijks Ijzer - geschutgieterij te Luik, which the Japanese had received via the Dutch trading post at Nagasaki. The southern pair of furnaces were completed in 1855 and the northern pair in 1857. Two sets of furnaces were constructed, as the facility was intended to cast both bronze and iron cannon. The number of cannons actually produced at this location is not clear.

From surviving historical records, the following were produced in the few years the facility was in operation:

- 18-pounder cannon, cast iron. four completed, of which two were test-fired
- 24-pounder cannon, bronze, one completed (the cannon on display at the site is a replica made of cast iron in 2015)
- 80-pounder cannon, bronze, four were possibly completed
- 20-inch mortar, bronze, on display at the site
- 29-inch mortar, bronze, on display at the site

== Gallery ==
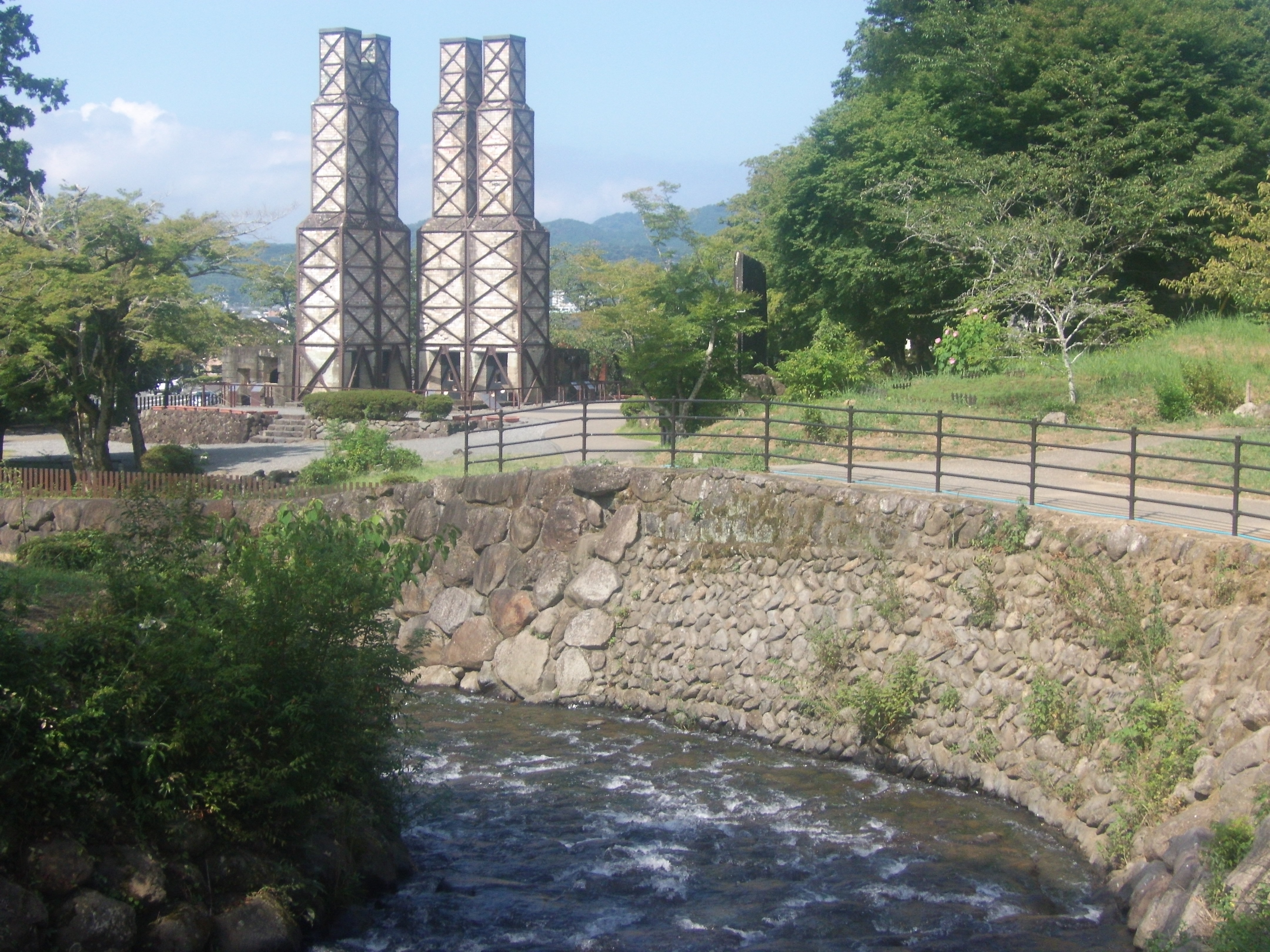
Side view with Furukawa River

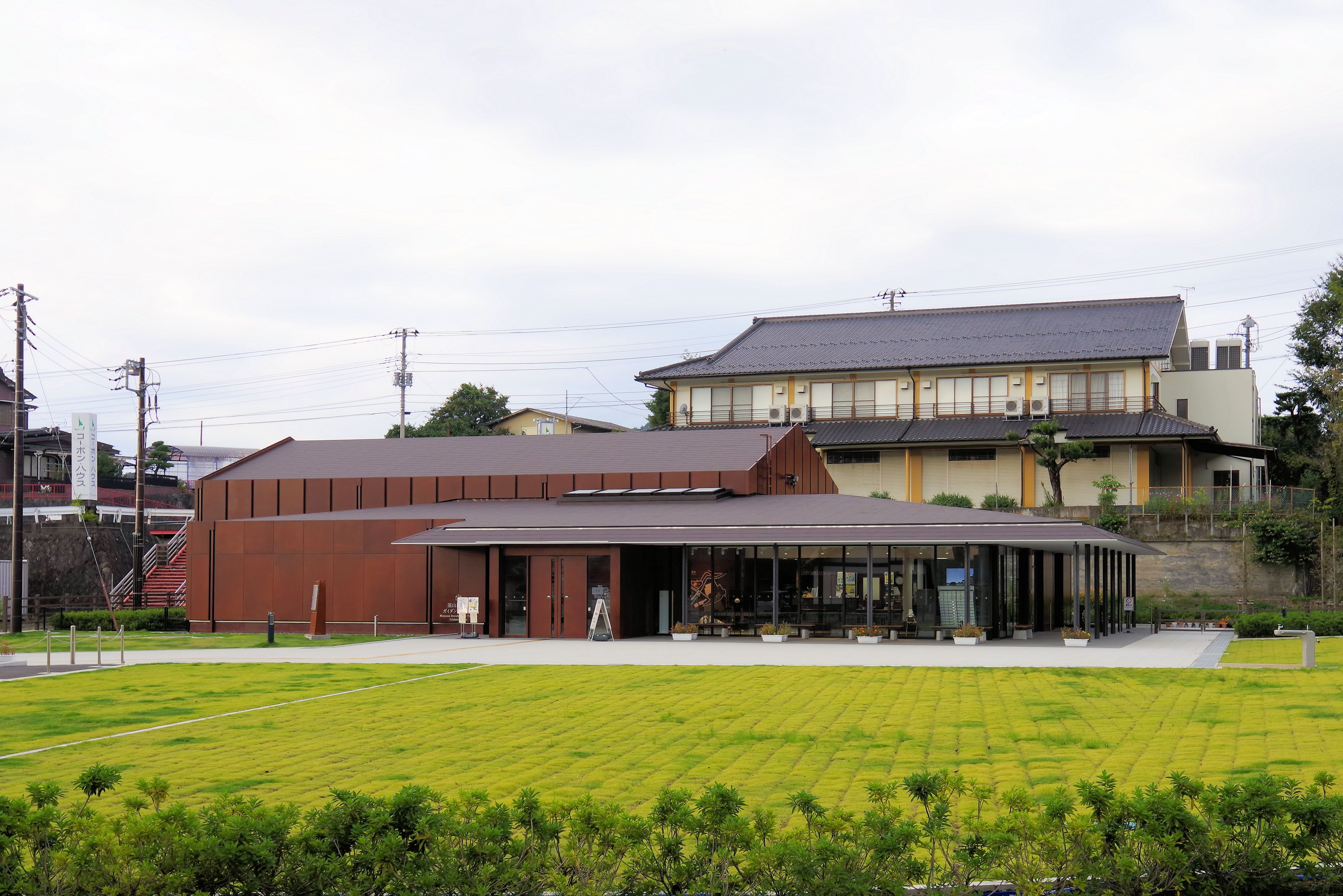
Nirayama Reverberatory Furnace Guidance Center

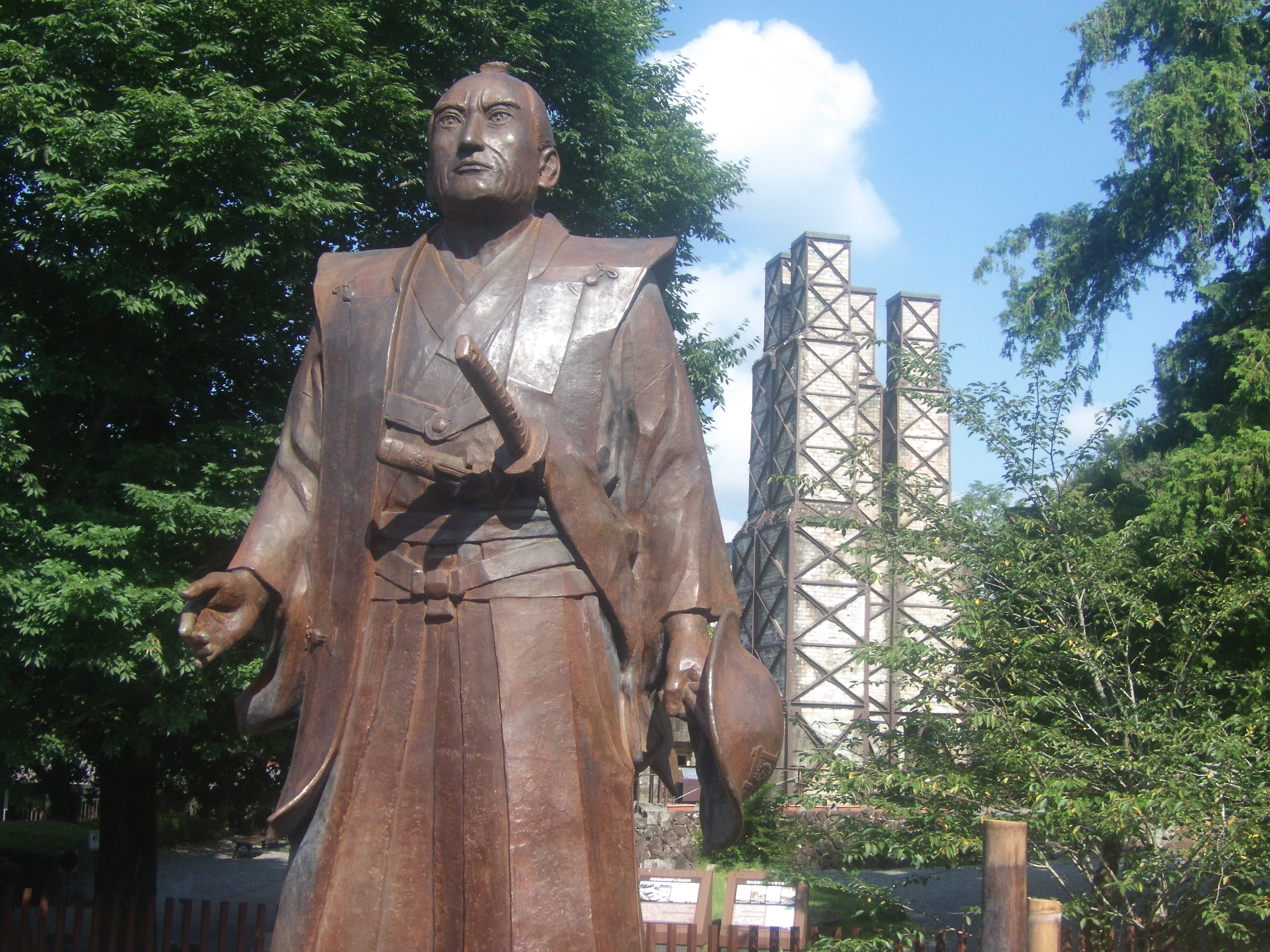
Bronze statue of Hidetatsu Egawa

== See also ==
- List of Historic Sites of Japan (Shizuoka)
