= Hodogaya-juku =

Fourth of the 53 stations of the Tōkaidō in Japan

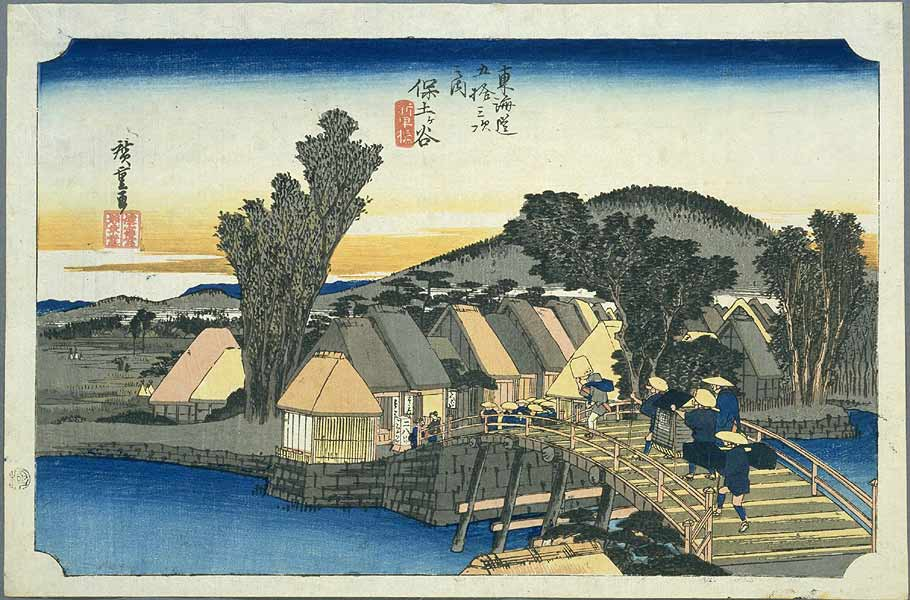
Hodogaya-juku in the 1830s, as depicted by Hiroshige in the Hōeidō edition of The Fifty-three Stations of the Tōkaidō (1831–1834)

Hodogaya-juku (程ヶ谷宿, Hodogaya-juku) was the fourth of the fifty-three stations of the Tōkaidō. It is located in Hodogaya-ku in the present-day city of Yokohama, Kanagawa Prefecture, Japan. Occasionally, it is also written as 保土ヶ谷宿.

== History ==
Hodogaya-juku was established in 1601, and it was the westernmost post station in Musashi Province during the Edo period. The honjin still belongs to the same family today as the one that owned it when it was first opened. Additionally, there is a stone Buddha statue that travelers often prayed to for safety while traveling along the Tōkaidō.

The classic ukiyo-e print by Andō Hiroshige (Hōeidō edition) from 1831 to 1834 depicts a bridge over a stream, with two porters carrying a closed kago towards a village on the other side. By the bridge is a soba restaurant with waitresses standing in front beckoning travellers to enter.

== Neighboring post towns ==
Tōkaidō
Kanagawa-juku - Hodogaya-juku - Totsuka-juku

Minor routes, including the Kanazawa-Kamakura-dō (金沢鎌倉道), the Hachiōji-dō (八王子道) and the Ōyama-dō (大山道), branched off of the Tōkaidō at Hodogaya-juku.

== Notes ==
Media related to Hodogaya-juku at Wikimedia Commons
