= Totsuka-ku =

Totsuka 戸塚区
- Ward
- Totsuka Ward
- Flag
- /0/queryThe property query is required; /0/idsThe property ids is required; /0Failed to match at least one schema; /0/titleThe property title is required; /0/serviceDoes not have a value in the enumeration ["page"]; /0Failed to match exactly one schema; /0/geometriesThe property geometries is required; /0/typeDoes not have a value in the enumeration ["GeometryCollection"]; /0/typeDoes not have a value in the enumeration ["MultiPolygon"]; /0/typeDoes not have a value in the enumeration ["Point"]; /0/typeDoes not have a value in the enumeration ["MultiPoint"]; /0/typeDoes not have a value in the enumeration ["LineString"]; /0/typeDoes not have a value in the enumeration ["MultiLineString"]; /0/typeDoes not have a value in the enumeration ["Polygon"]; /0/coordinatesThe property coordinates is required; /0/geometryThe property geometry is required; /0/typeDoes not have a value in the enumeration ["Feature"]; /0/featuresThe property features is required; /0/typeDoes not have a value in the enumeration ["FeatureCollection"]
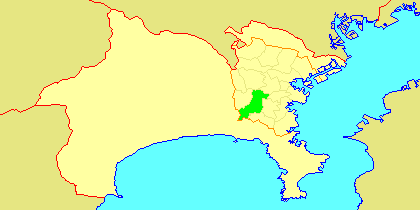
- Location of Totsuka in Kanagawa

- Totsuka (Japan)
- Coordinates: 35°23′47″N 139°31′57″E
- Country: Japan
- Region: Kantō
- Prefecture: Kanagawa
- City: Yokohama

Area
  - Total: 35.70 km^{2} (13.78 sq mi)

Population (September 2010)
  - Total: 274,783
  - Density: 7,697/km^{2} (19,940/sq mi)
- Time zone: UTC+9 (Japan Standard Time)
- Flower: Sakura
- Address: 16-17 Totsuka-chō, Totsuka-ku Yokohama-shi, Kanagawa-ken; 244-0003
- Website: Totsuka Ward Office

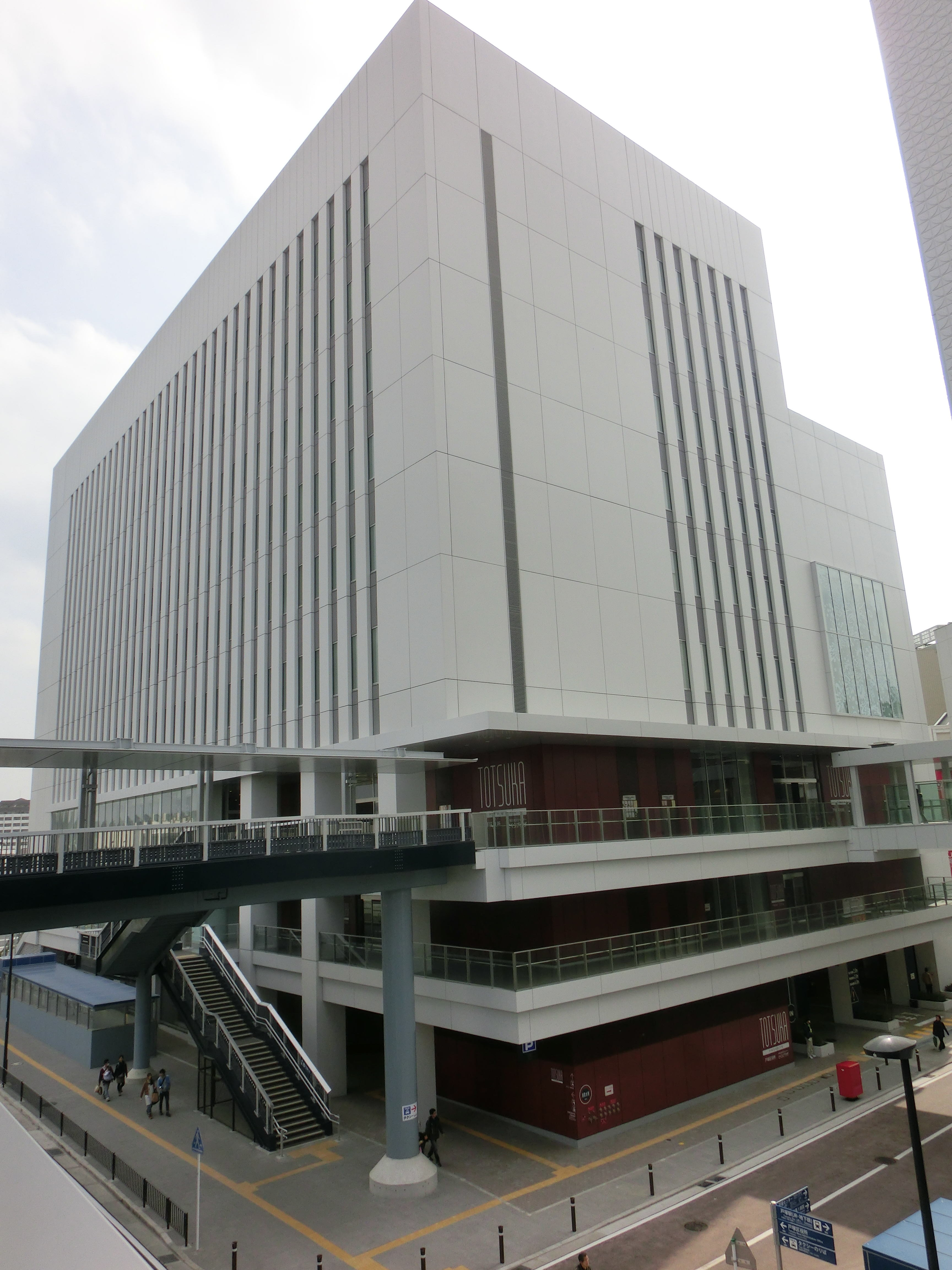
Totsuka Ward Office building completed in 2013

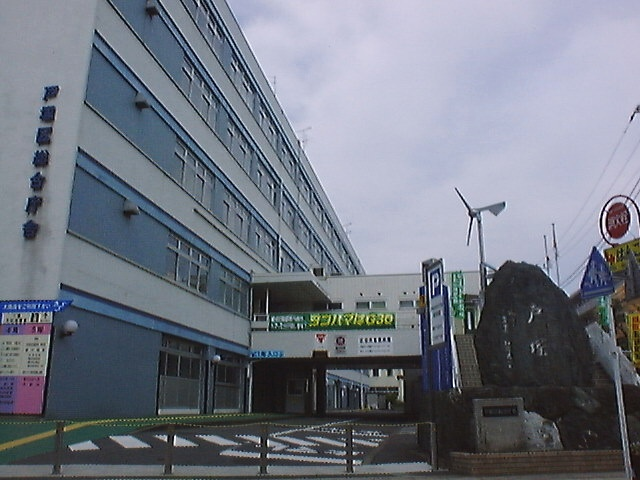
Former Totsuka Ward Office at 157-3 Totsuka-chō

Totsuka-ku (戸塚区) is one of the 18 wards of the city of Yokohama in Kanagawa Prefecture, Japan. As of 2010, the ward had an estimated population of 273,418 and a density of 7,640 persons per km^{2}. The total area is 35.70 km^{2}.

== Geography ==
Totsuka Ward is located in eastern Kanagawa Prefecture, and in the center-western area of the city of Yokohama. The area is largely flatland, with scattered small hills. The Kashio River passes through the ward.

=== Surrounding municipalities ===
- Sakae Ward
- Hodagaya Ward
- Minami Ward
- Asahi Ward
- Kōnan Ward
- Izumi Ward
- Kamakura
- Fujisawa

== History ==
The area around present-day Totsuka Ward has been inhabited for thousands of years. Archaeologists have found ceramic shards from the Jōmon period at numerous locations in the area. There are numerous keyhole tombs from the Kofun period in Totsuka, including one on the grounds of Tomizuka Hachiman Shrine, from which the ward's name is derived.

Under the Nara period Ritsuryō system, it became part of Kamakura District and Kōza District in Sagami Province. By the Heian period, it was part of a shōen controlled by the Sudō clan, but came under the control of the Kamakura clan (of which Kamakura Gongorō Kagemasa was the most illustrious member) by the start of the Kamakura period. During the Kamakura period, it was largely farmland, supporting the population of nearby Kamakura; however, by the Muromachi period, it had become a contested territory divided between the Hatakeyama clan, Miura clan, Oba clan, and others until their territories were seized by the Later Hōjō clan from Odawara in the late Sengoku period. After the defeat of the Hōjō at the Battle of Odawara, the territory came under the control of Tokugawa Ieyasu. It was administered as tenryō territory controlled directly by the Tokugawa shogunate, but administered through various hatamoto. The area prospered in the Edo period as Totsuka-juku, a post station on the Tōkaidō connecting Edo with Kyoto.

After the Meiji Restoration, the area was transferred to the new Kanagawa Prefecture, with Totsuka-shuku becoming the capital of the Kamakura District. Totsuka Town was established in the cadastral reform of April 1, 1889, two years after the completion of Totsuka Station on the Tōkaidō Main Line railway connecting Tokyo with Osaka. During the Meiji period, the area prospered as a center of meat production to supply the foreign population of nearby Yokohama. In April 1939, Totsuka and neighboring villages were annexed by the neighboring city of Yokohama, becoming Totsuka Ward. In 1944, the Imperial Japanese Navy established a medical school and large scale hospital facilities in Totsuka. In 1966, Seya Ward was separated from Totsuka. In a major administrative reorganization of 1986, Izumi Ward and Sakae Ward were also separated from Totsuka.

== Economy ==
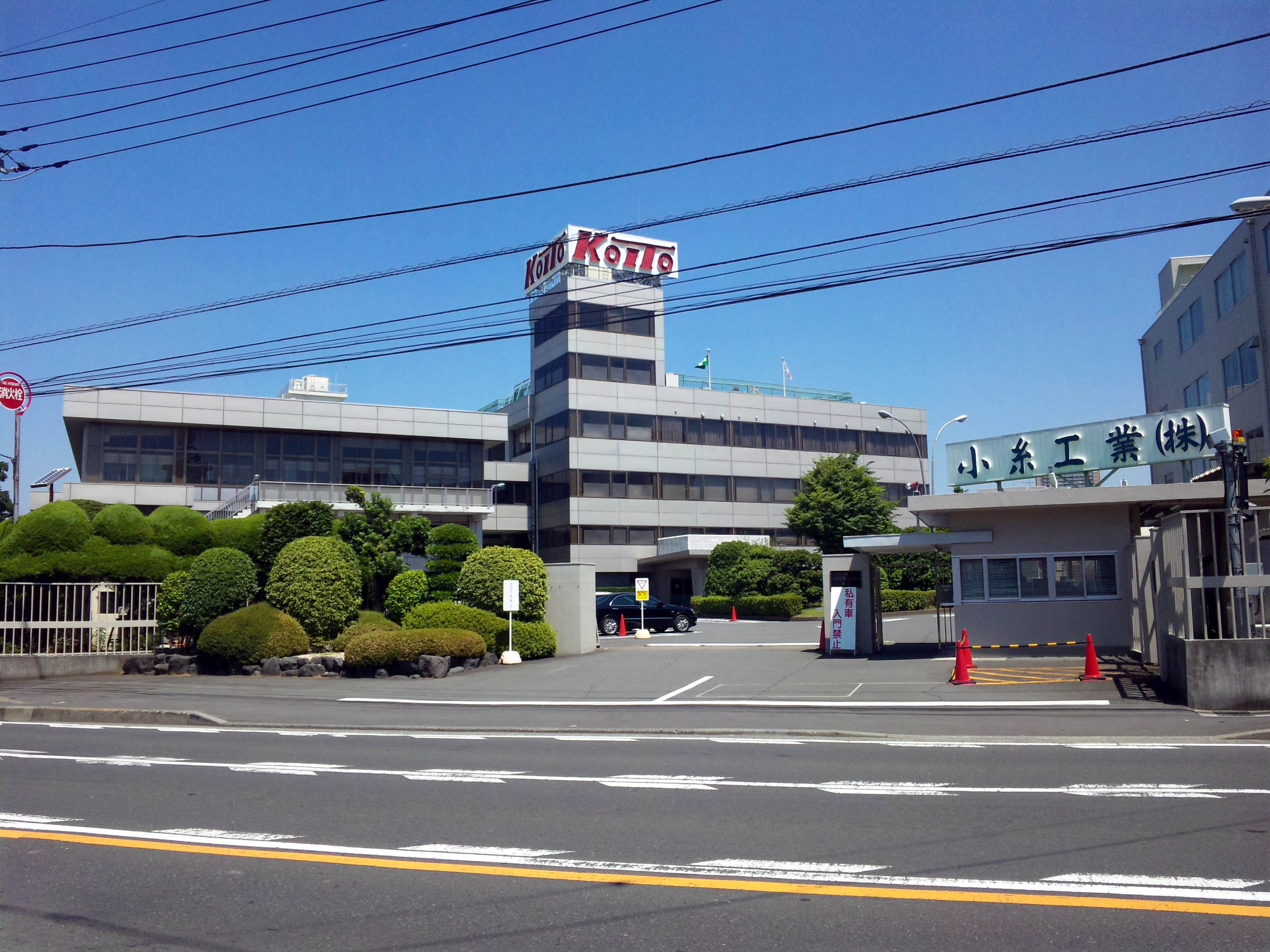
Koito Industries headquarters

Totsuka is largely a regional commercial center and bedroom community for central Yokohama and Tokyo. Totsuka retains a relatively strong industrial base. In 2010, 160 factories in the ward employed 12,010 employees, and their shipment amounted to 399 billion yen.

There are major factories in the area operated by Koito, Hitachi, Nissin Foods, Yamazaki Baking, Pola Cosmetics, and others.

== Transportation ==
=== Railroads ===
- JR East - Tōkaidō Main Line
  - Totsuka
- JR East - Yokosuka Line – Shōnan-Shinjuku Line
  - Totsuka – Higashi-Totsuka
- Yokohama City Transportation Bureau – Blue Line
  - Maioka - Totsuka

=== Bus ===
- Kanagawa Chuo Kotsu / Yokohama Kanako Bus / Fujisawa Kanako Bus
  - Maioka Garage
- Yokohama Municipal Bus
- Sagami Railway Bus
- Enoden Bus

=== Highways ===
==== National Highways ====
- Yokohama Shindō (a bypass route of Route 1)
- Route 1

==== Prefecture roads ====
- Kanagawa Prefectural Route 23
- Kanagawa Prefectural Route 203
- Kanagawa Prefectural Route 218
- Kanagawa Prefectural Route 401
- Kanagawa Prefectural Route 402
- Kanagawa Prefectural Route 403

==== City roads ====
- Main Local Road No. 17 Loop Line 2
- Loop Line 3
- Main Local Road No. 18 Loop Line 4
- Totsuka-Ōfuna Line
- Maioka-Kamigō Line

== Education ==
Colleges and Universities:

- Meiji Gakuin University
- Yokohama College of Pharmacy
- Kihara Institute for Biological Research (Yokohama City University)
- Shōnan University of Medical Sciences

Kanagawa Prefectural Board of Education operates prefectural senior high schools:

- Kamiyabe High School
- Maioka High School
- Yokohama Oh-yō High School

Yokohama Municipal Board of Education operates the following municipal high school:

- Totsuka High School

Private secondary school:

- Kumon Kokusai Gakuen Junior & Senior High School

The municipal board of education operates municipal elementary schools and junior high schools.

Junior high schools:

- Akiba (秋葉)
- Fukaya (深谷)
- Gumisawa (汲沢)
- Hirado (平戸)
- Maioka (舞岡)
- Minami-totsuka (南戸塚)
- Nase (名瀬)
- Sakaigi (境木)
- Taishō (大正)
- Totsuka (戸塚)
- Toyoda (豊田)

Additionally, Ryokuen Gakuen (緑園学園), a combined elementary and junior high school outside of Totsuka-ku, has an attendance zone including parts of Totsuka-ku.

Elementary schools:

- Akiba (秋葉)
- Fukaya (深谷)
- Gumisawa (汲沢)
- Higashi-gumisawa (東汲沢)
- Higashi-matano (東俣野)
- Higashi-shinano (東品濃)
- Higashi-totsuka (東戸塚)
- Hirado (平戸)
- Hiradodai (平戸台)
- Kamiyabe (上矢部)
- Kashio (柏尾)
- Kawakami (川上)
- Kawakami-kita (川上北)
- Kosuzume (小雀)
- Kurata (倉田)
- Maioka (舞岡)
- Minami-maioka (南舞岡)
- Minami-totsuka (南戸塚)
- Nase (名瀬)
- Sakaigi (境木)
- Shimogō (下郷)
- Shinano (品濃)
- Taishō (大正)
- Torigaoka (鳥が丘)
- Totsuka (戸塚)
- Yabe (矢部)
- Yokohama Fukayadai (横浜深谷台)

Former elementary schools:

- Matano (俣野) - Merged into Fukayadai Elementary (深谷台小学校) in 2017 to form Yokohama Fukayadai Elementary.

Additionally, Kosugaya Elementary School (小菅ケ谷小学校), Kuzuno Elementary School (葛野小学校), Mutsukawa Nishi Elementary School (六つ川西小学校), and Toyoda Elementary School (豊田小学校), outside of Totsuka-ku, have attendance zones including parts of Totsuka-ku.

== Noted people from Totsuka ==
- Tomoyoshi Ono, professional football player
- Shunsuke Nakamura, professional football player
- Takeshi Mizuuchi, professional football player
- Wataru Endo, professional football player
- Ken Takahashi, professional baseball player
- Naomi Hosokawa, actress
- Shinichiro Sakurai, engineer and car designer
