= Totsuka-juku =

Fifth of the 53 stations of the Tōkaidō in Japan

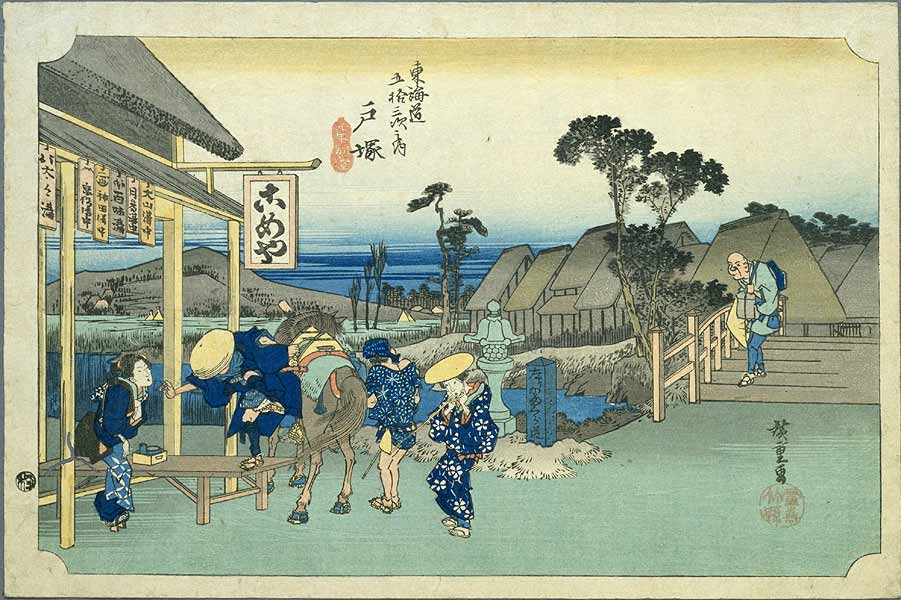
Totsuka-juku in the 1830s, as depicted by Hiroshige in the Hōeidō edition of The Fifty-three Stations of the Tōkaidō (1831–1834)

Totsuka-juku (戸塚宿, Totsuka-juku) was the fifth of the fifty-three stations (shukuba) of the Tōkaidō. It was the easternmost post station in Sagami Province. It is now located in Totsuka-ku in the present-day city of Yokohama, Kanagawa Prefecture, Japan.

== History ==
Because Totsuka-juku was approximately one day's journey from Nihonbashi, it was a very common resting place for travelers at the start of the journey and the largest post station after Odawara-juku. Because of its size, there were two honjin in the post station as well, one belonging to the Sawabe family (澤辺) and the other belonging to the Uchida family (内田). Another reason for Totsuka-juku being so large was that it was also the intersection of Kamakura Kaidō and the Atsugi Kaidō. A distance marker can now be found in both Shinano-chō and Totsuka-chō.

During the Bakumatsu period, when Commodore Matthew C. Perry arrived in Uraga Harbor with his Black Ships, many frightened citizens fled to Totsuka-juku.

The classic ukiyo-e print by Andō Hiroshige (Hōeidō edition) from 1831–1834 depicts a traveler (one dismounting from a horse), entering into a tea-house. In the background, a wooden bridge leads across a stream to what appears to be a sizeable settlement.

== Senryū ==
There was a senryū named after Tostuka-juku:

佐野の馬 戸塚の坂で 二度転び
Sano no uma / Totsuka no saka de / nido korobi.
The horse of Sano / at the hill of Totsuka's / goes around it twice.

This senryū is a parody of a Noh story called Hachi no Ki (ja:鉢木) and references to the geography surrounding Totsuka-juku.

== Neighboring post towns ==
Tōkaidō
Hodogaya-juku - Totsuka-juku - Fujisawa-shuku
