= List of works by Sharaku =

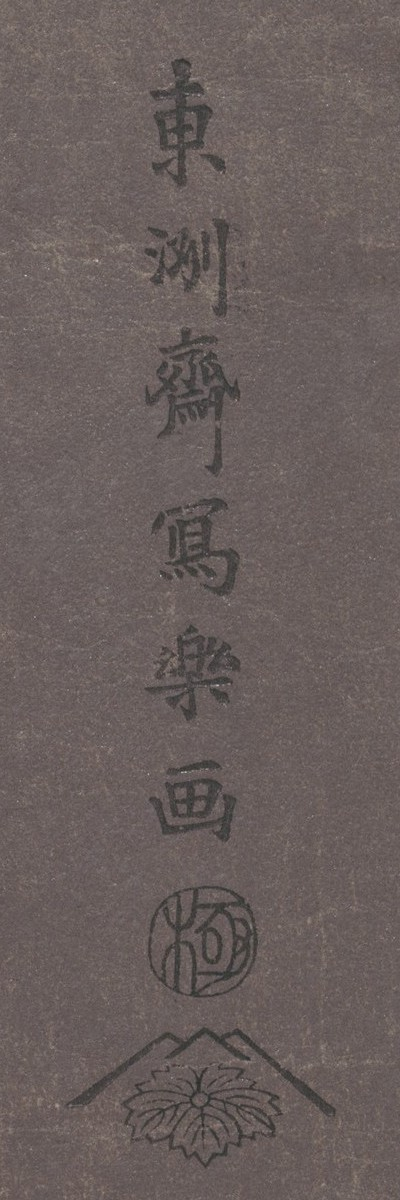
Sharaku's signature on his first-period work: Tōshūsai Sharaku ga (東洲齊冩樂画), followed with the censor's seal kiwame (極) and the publisher's mark of Tsutaya Jūzaburō

158 works and sketches survive of the Japanese artist known only by the art name Tōshūsai Sharaku. Almost all were made over a ten-month period in 1794–1795, divided into four periods:

1. 5th month of Kansei 6 (May–June 1794) – 28 ōban prints
2. 7th and 8th months of Kansei 6 (July–September 1794) – 8 ōban and 30 hosoban prints
3. 11th and intercalary 11th months of Kansei 6 (November 1794 – January 1795) – 47 hosoban, 13 aiban, and 4 ōban prints
4. 1st month of Kansei 7 (February–March 1795) – 10 hosoban and 5 aiban prints

The print sizes became progressively smaller and the focus shifts from busts to full-length portraits. The depictions become less expressive and more conventional. Two picture calendars dating to as early as 1789 and three decorated fans as late as 1803 have been attributed to Sharaku, but have yet to be accepted as authentic works of his. A number of hanshita-e preparatory drawings have also been found.

== Background ==
In Sharaku's time the Kawarazaki-za, the Kiri-za, and the Miyako-za were the three major kabuki theatre houses of Edo: the Edo San-za. (Note: 江戸三座 Edo San-za)

Just over 600 copies of Sharaku's prints are known; only about 100 remain in Japan. As they are in collections scattered throughout the world general research on Sharaku's works has followed different threads in Japan and the West has proved time-consuming. Japanese researchers have better knowledge of and access to documents and literature related to Sharaku's time and conditions. On the other hand, Sharaku's works tend to be in Western collections, including prints for which only one copy is known—of which there are about three dozen. Three of these are of unknown whereabouts, known only through published photographs. The largest Western collection is the 70 pieces at the Museum of Fine Arts, Boston, 6 of which are unique; the Art Institute of Chicago (8 unique pieces), New York's Metropolitan Museum of Art, the British Museum, and the Guimet Museum in Paris also have substantial collections. In 1920, Kōjirō Matsukata bought a large number of ukiyo-e prints in Paris and brought them back to Japan. These 70 pieces reside at the Tokyo National Museum, 3 of which are unique.

The prints bear no titles, and descriptive titles vary in both Japanese and English. Amongst the variations in Japanese are the numbering for the generations of actors; for example, a second-generation actor's name might have nidai (二代) or nidaime (二代目) prepended in some sources and nisei (二世) in others, or the generation might be absent. The list here does not give variant titles, and the titles given are not official.

=== Print sizes ===
Sharaku's prints appeared in the common print sizes ōban, hosoban, and aiban. The approximate dimensions of these sizes are:

- ōban – 25 by 36 centimetres (10 in × 14 in)
- hosoban – 15 by 33 centimetres (6 in × 13 in)
- aiban – 23 by 33 centimetres (9 in × 13 in)

=== Periodization ===
Sharaku's prints are divided into four periods. The prints of the first two periods are signed "Tōshūsai Sharaku" (東洲齊冩樂), (Note: Modern sources adhere to the orthography 東洲斎写楽.) and the latter two only "Sharaku" (冩樂).

1. 5th month of Kansei 6 – 28 ōban prints
  The 5th month of Kansei 6 fell from 29 May to 26 June 1794.
2. 7th and 8th months of Kansei 6 – 8 ōban and 30 hosoban prints
  The 7th month of Kansei 6 fell from 27 July to 25 August 1794, and the eighth month from 26 August to 23 September 1794.
3. 11th and intercalary 11th months of Kansei 6 – 47 hosoban, 13 aiban, and 4 ōban prints
  The 11th month of Kansei 6 fell from 23 November to 22 December 1794, and the intercalary 11th month from 23 December 1794 to 20 January 1795.
4. 1st month of Kansei 7 – 10 hosoban and 5 aiban prints
  The 1st month of the 7th year of Kansei fell from 19 February to 20 March 1795.

The print sizes progressively became smaller and the focus shifts from busts to full-length portraits. The depictions become less expressive and more conventional. Two picture calendars dating to as early as 1789 and three decorated fans as late as 1803 have been attributed to Sharaku, but have yet to be accepted as authentic works of his.

== First period ==
Sharaku's first period is made up of twenty-eight known prints, each in ōban size. They appeared in the 5th month of Kansei 6, which fell from 29 May to 26 June 1794. They depict actors in their rôles in the kabuki plays Hana-ayame Bunroku Soga, Katakiuchi Noriai-banashi, Koi Nyōbō Somewake Tazuna, and Yoshitsune Senbon-zakura.

=== Hana-ayame Bunroku Soga ===
Playwright Matsui Yūsuke's (Note: 松井由輔 Matsui Yūsuke) Hana-ayame Bunroku Soga (花菖蒲文禄曽我, "Blooming Iris, Soga of the Bunroku Era") is a kabuki adaptation of a true story of revenge, the early 18th-century "Kameyama Vengeance" in which the Ishii brothers Hanzō and Genzō spent 28 years to exact revenge on their father Uemon's murderer. The story enjoyed great popularity and had several theatrical adaptations.

The play débuted at the Miyako-za theatre in the 5th month of 6th year of Kansei. Many details of it are no longer known. Ishii Genzō tries to kill his enemy Fujikawa Mizuemon, who instead kills Genzō and his wife. The plot then follows Genzō's retainer Tanabe Bunzō and Genzō's orphaned son, who set off to exact revenge. Ōgishi Kurando plays a selfless, stately samurai who lends a hand, and Bunzō's retainer Sodesuke serves as comic relief. Hakujin Onayo's rôle is unknown, but it is thought she helps out with the revenge.

==== Ōtani Tokuji I as the manservant Sodesuke ====
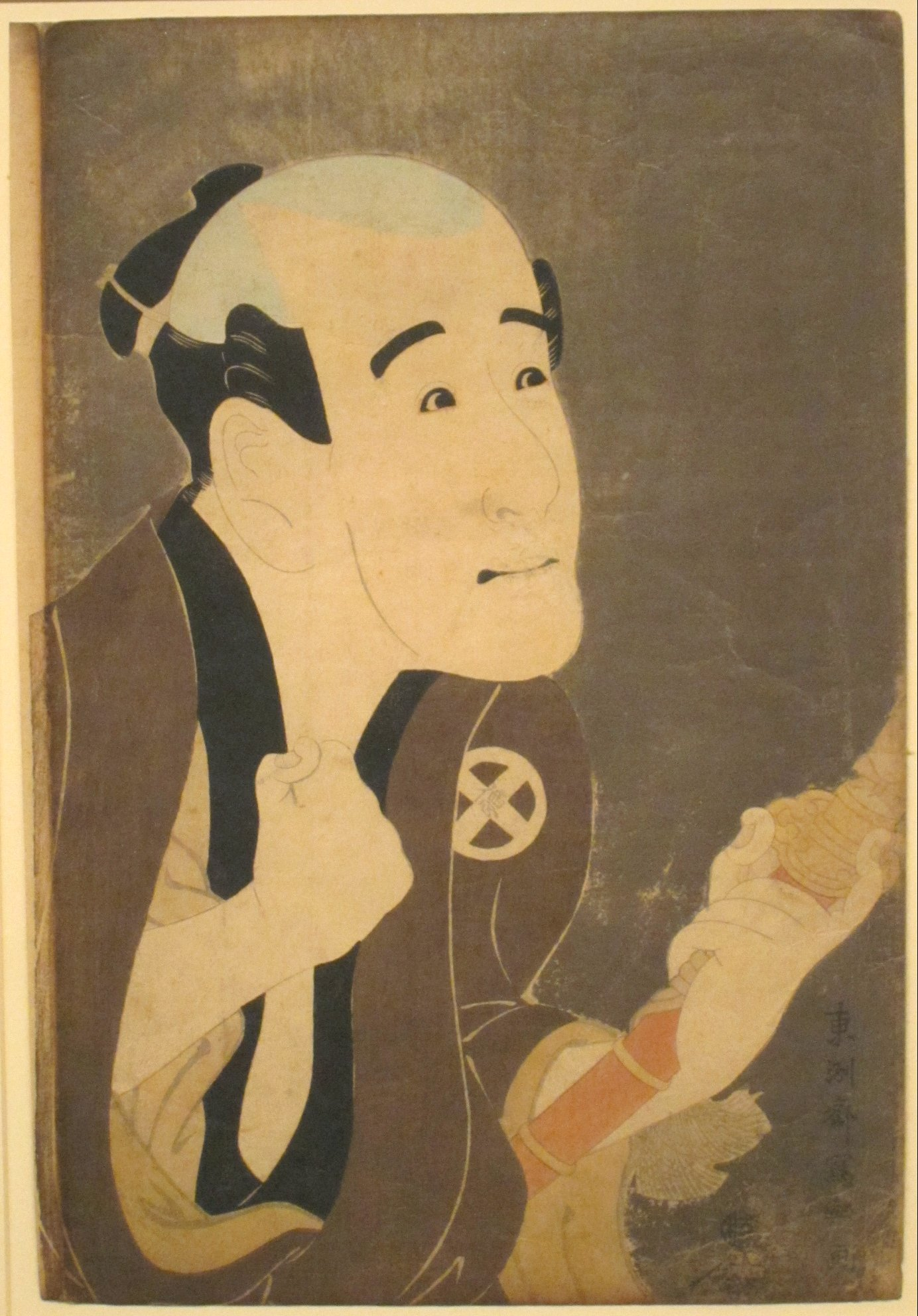

Sodesuke is a faithful foot-man of the Ishii family. He is present in the first scene, arriving late to meet his master Ishii Hyōei (石井 兵衛) at a shrine in Hamamatsu in Tōtōmi Province. He witnesses a group including Fujikawa Mizuemon ambush and kill Hyōei before the shrine under cover of darkness. Sodesuke brings Hyōei's body to Hyōei's eldest son Genzō, in the middle of Genzō's wedding, and explains what has happened. Sharaku depicts a shockeded Sodesuke as he arrives at the scene of his master's murder.

18 copies are known of the ōban print of Ōtani Tokuji I (1756–1807) as the manservant Sodesuke (初世大谷徳次の奴袖助 Shosei Ōtani Tokuji no yakko Sodesuke); one each are in the collections of the Tokyo National Museum, the Japan Ukiyo-e Museum, the Ukiyo-e Ōta Memorial Museum of Art, the Baur Foundation, the Museum of Asian Art, the British Museum, the Museum of Fine Arts, Boston, the Brooklyn Museum, the Art Institute of Chicago, the Cleveland Museum of Art, the Edoardo Chiossone Museum of Oriental Art, the Honolulu Museum of Art, the Harvard Art Museums, the Metropolitan Museum of Art, the Nelson-Atkins Museum of Art, the Philadelphia Museum of Art, and the Worcester Art Museum, and another is in a private collection.

==== Sakata Hangorō III as Fujikawa Mizuemon ====
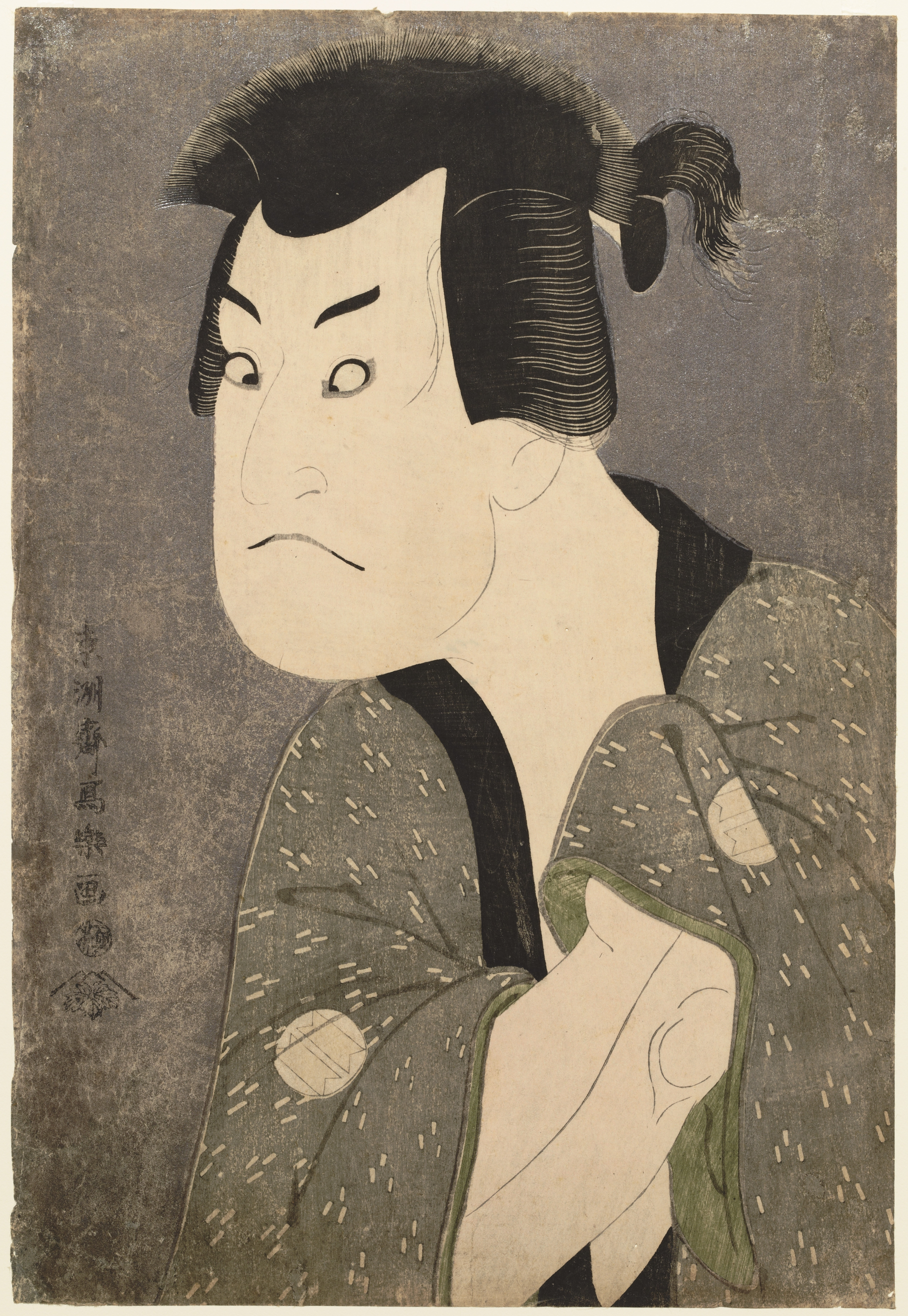

The powerful Mizuemon, resentful at having lost a sword fight to his patron Ishii Hyōei, murders Hyōei and steals from him a secret book on Japanese swordsmanship. Hyōei's sons attempt revenge, but in the third act Mizuemon kills Hyōei's eldest son Genzō and his wife at the Abe River in neighbouring Suruga Province. Sharaku depicts Mizuemon at the scene of his murder of Genzō. The print pairs with the one of Bandō Mitsugorō II as Ishii Genzō.

13 copies are known of the ōban print of Sakata Hangorō III as Fujikawa Mizuemon (三世坂田半五郎の藤川水右衛門 Sansei Sakata Hangorō no Fujikawa Mizuemon); one each are in the collections of the Tokyo National Museum, the Ukiyo-e Ōta Memorial Museum of Art, the Yamatane Museum, the Achenbach Foundation for Graphic Arts at the Fine Arts Museums of San Francisco, the Rijksmuseum, the Galerie Berès, the British Museum, the Museum of Fine Arts, Boston, the Art Institute of Chicago, the Guimet Museum, the Metropolitan Museum of Art, the Allen Memorial Art Museum, and a private collection.

==== Bandō Mitsugorō II as Ishii Genzō ====
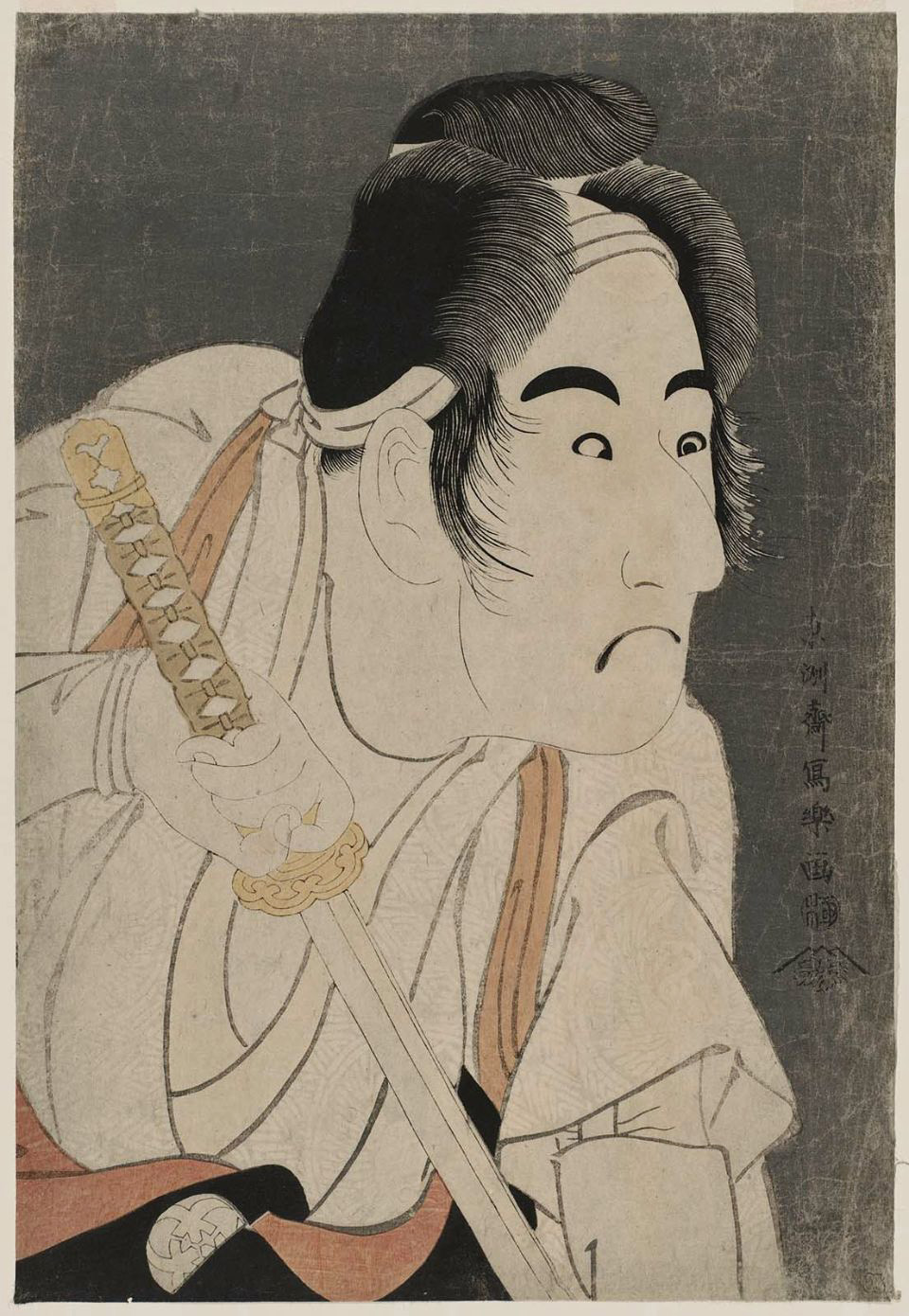

When Ishii Genzō learns of the murder of his father in the middle of his wedding, he commits himself to revenge. He attacks the murderer Mizuemon's father in the second act, and in the third tries to kill Mizuemon at the Abe River in Suruga Province, but Mizuemon turns then table and kills Genzō and his wife. Sharaku depicts Genzō at his encounter with Mizuemon at the Abe River. The print pairs with the one of Sakata Hangorō III as Fujikawa Mizuemon.

9 copies of the ōban print of Bandō Mitsugorō II as Ishii Genzō (二世坂東三津五郎の石井源蔵 Nisei Bandō Mitsugorō no Ishii Genzō); one each are in the collections of the Tokyo National Museum, the Nara Prefectural Museum of Art, the Galerie Berès, the British Museum, the Museum of Fine Arts, Boston, the Royal Museums of Art and History, the Art Institute of Chicago, the Guimet Museum, and the Metropolitan Museum of Art.

==== Sanogawa Ichimatsu III as Hakujin Onayo of Gion and Ichikawa Tomiemon as Kanisaka Tōma ====
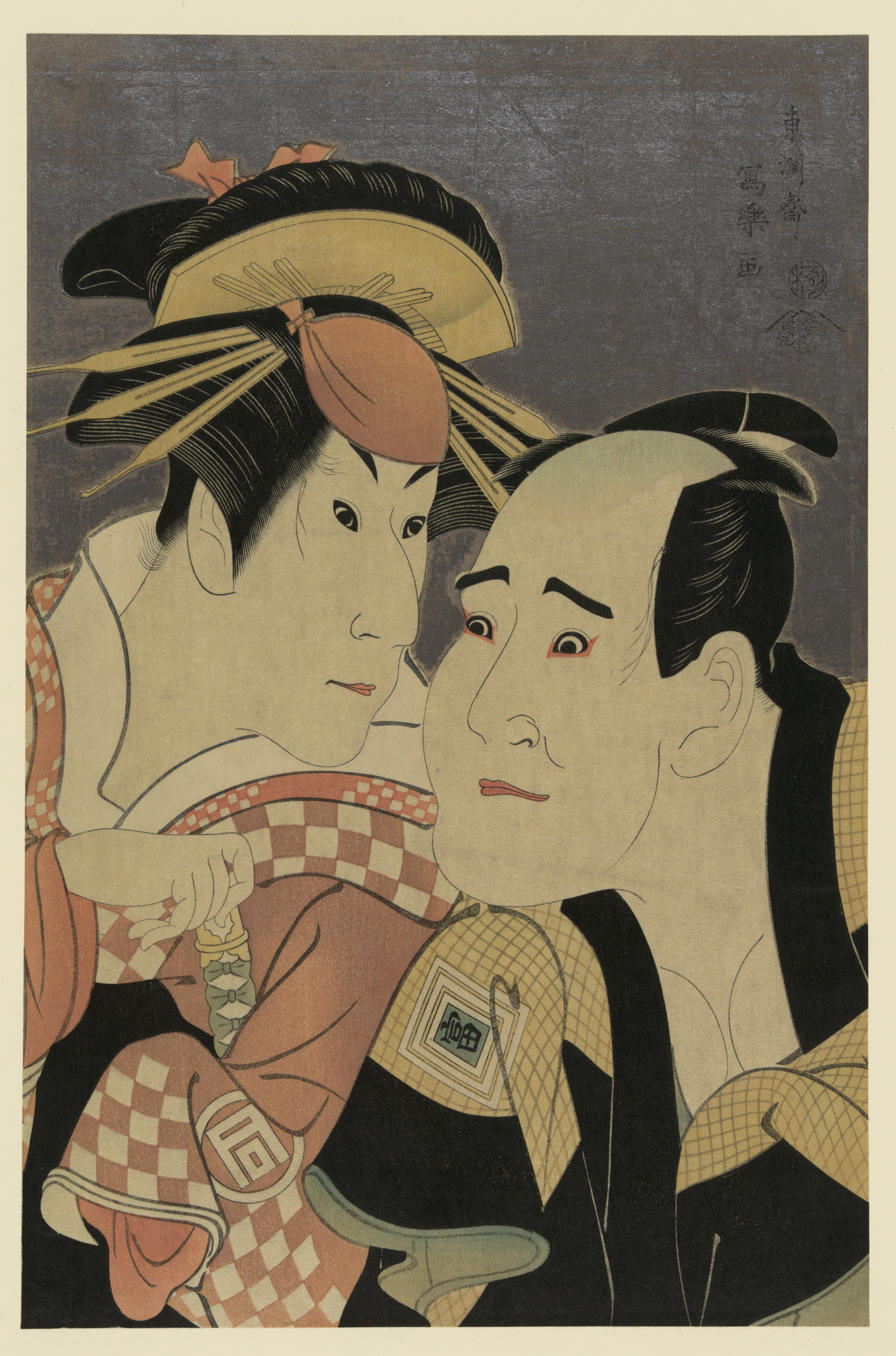

Tōma is one of Mizuemon's followers, and Onayo a prostitute of the Gion district. The print depicts the pair in the fourth act, when Tōma has fallen into such financial ruin that he takes on work as a gidayū reciter in bunraku puppet theatre. At this point, he becomes involved with Hakujin Onayo, a prostitute of the Gion district.

6 copies are known of the ōban print of Sanogawa Ichimatsu III as Hakujin Onayo of Gion and Ichikawa Tomiemon as Kanisaka Tōma (三世佐野川市松の祇園町の白人おなよと市川富右衛門の蟹坂藤馬 Sansei Sanogawa Ichimatsu no Gion-chō no Hakujin Onayo to Ichikawa Tomiemon no Kanisaka Tōma); one each are in the collections of the Tokyo National Museum, the Rijksmuseum, the Museum of Asian Art, the Royal Museums of Art and History, and the Art Institute of Chicago, and another is in a private collection.

==== Sanogawa Ichimatsu III as Hakujin Onayo of Gion ====
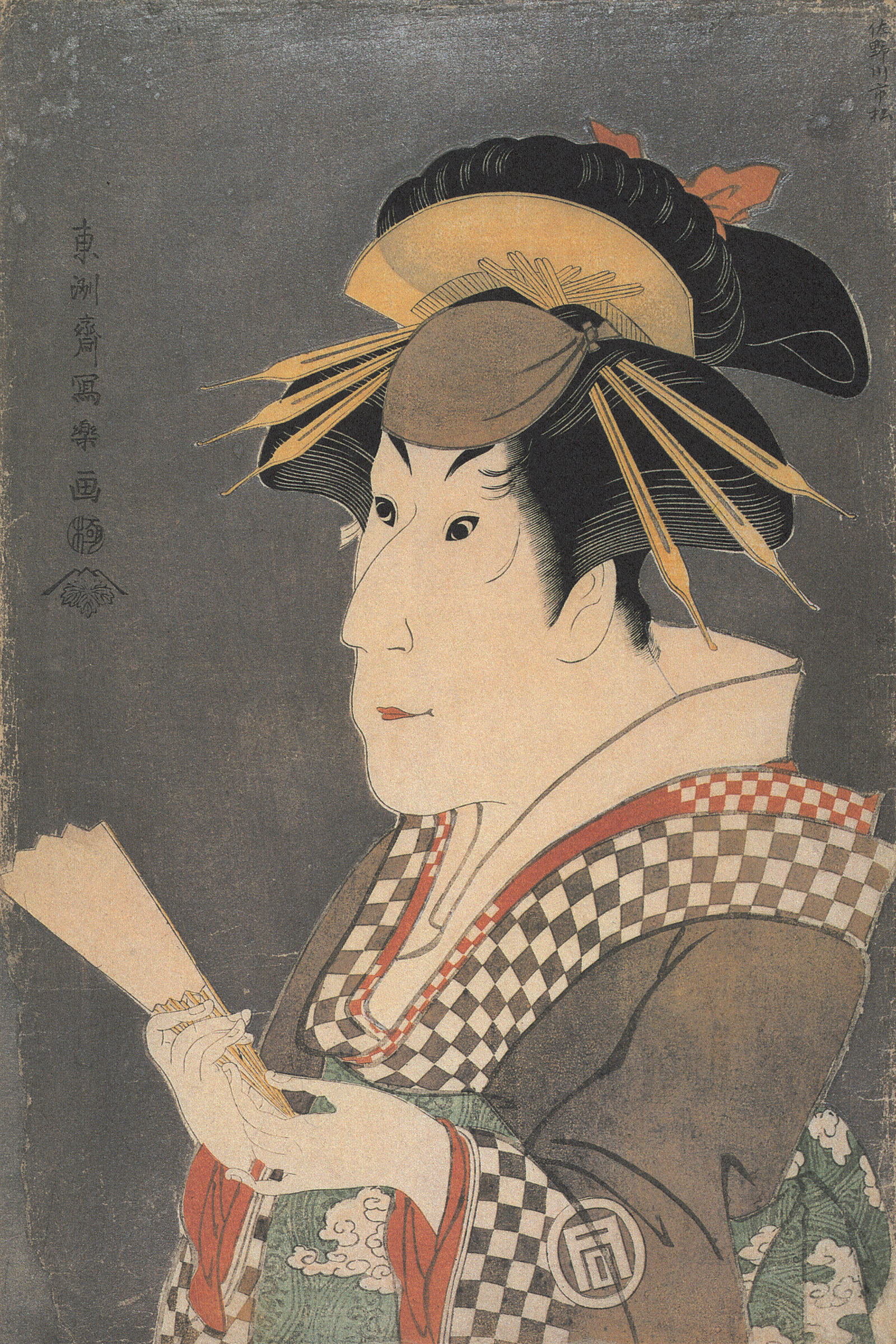

Hakujin Onayo is a prostitute of Gion, played by Ichimatsu, an onnagata—a male actor who performed female rôles. Her rôle in the narrative is unknown, but it is thought she helps out with the revenge. She may have played a rôle similar to that of Okaru in the Kanadehon Chūshingura; Okaru had herself sold into prostitution to raise funds a vendetta. She wears on her clothes the hiragana character "い" ("i") enclosed in a circle—the same mon crest the karō Ōgishi Kurando wears.

10 copies are known of the ōban print of Sanogawa Ichimatsu III as Hakujin Onayo of Gion (三世佐野川市松の祇園町の白人おなよ Sansei Sanogawa Ichimatsu no Gion-chō no Hakujin Onayo). One copy each are in the collections of the Tokyo National Museum, the Hiraki Ukiyo-e Foundation, the Achenbach Foundation for Graphic Arts at the Fine Arts Museums of San Francisco, the British Museum, the Museum of Fine Arts, Boston, the Royal Museums of Art and History, the Art Institute of Chicago, the Edoardo Chiossone Museum of Oriental Art, and the Guimet Museum; and one in a private collection.

==== Sawamura Sōjūrō III as Ōgishi Kurando ====
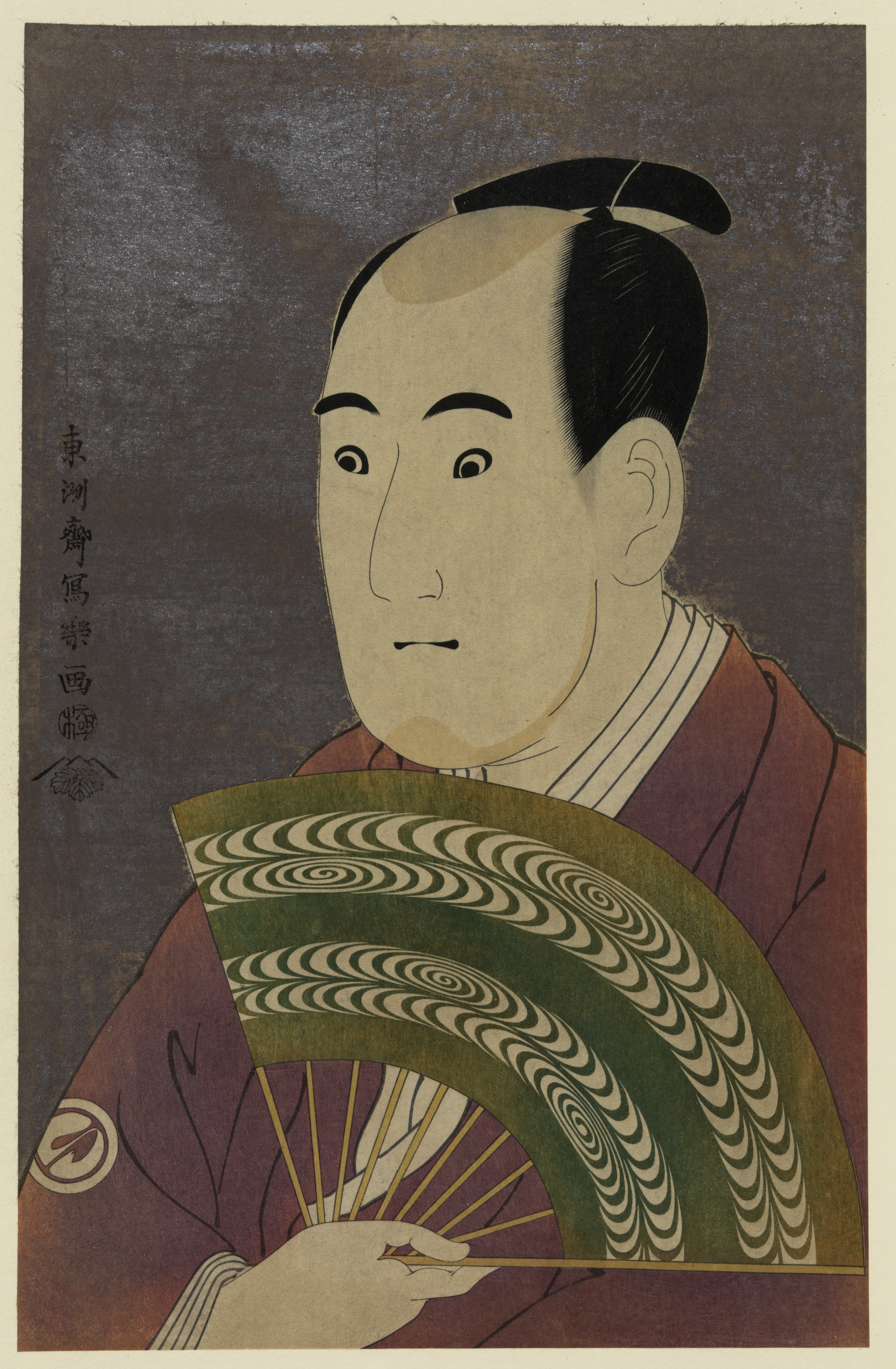

Ōgishi Kurando is the karō (house elder) of the Momoi daimyō family of Kameyama Castle and sympathizes with the Ishii brothers. He wears on his clothes a mon crest with the hiragana character "い" ("i") enclosed in a circle, for which Mizuemon mistakes him for a member of the Ishiis in the fifth act and attacks him at a teahouse in Gion. Kurando discovers that his attacker is Mizuemon, and that he has the secret book of swordsmanship. Kurando goes on to help the Ishii brothers get their revenge in the seventh act. Sharaku depicts Kurando at the teahouse in the fifth act.

11 copies are known of the ōban print of Sawamura Sōjūrō III as Ōgishi Kurando (三世沢村宗十郎の大岸蔵人 Sansei Sawamura Sōjūrō no Ōgishi Kurando); one each are in the collections of the Tokyo National Museum, the British Museum, the Museum of Fine Arts, Boston, the Art Institute of Chicago, the Honolulu Museum of Art, the Harvard Art Museums, and the Philadelphia Museum of Art; two are in the collection of the Guimet Museum; and two are in private collections.

==== Segawa Kikunojō III as Oshizu, wife of Tanabe Bunzō ====
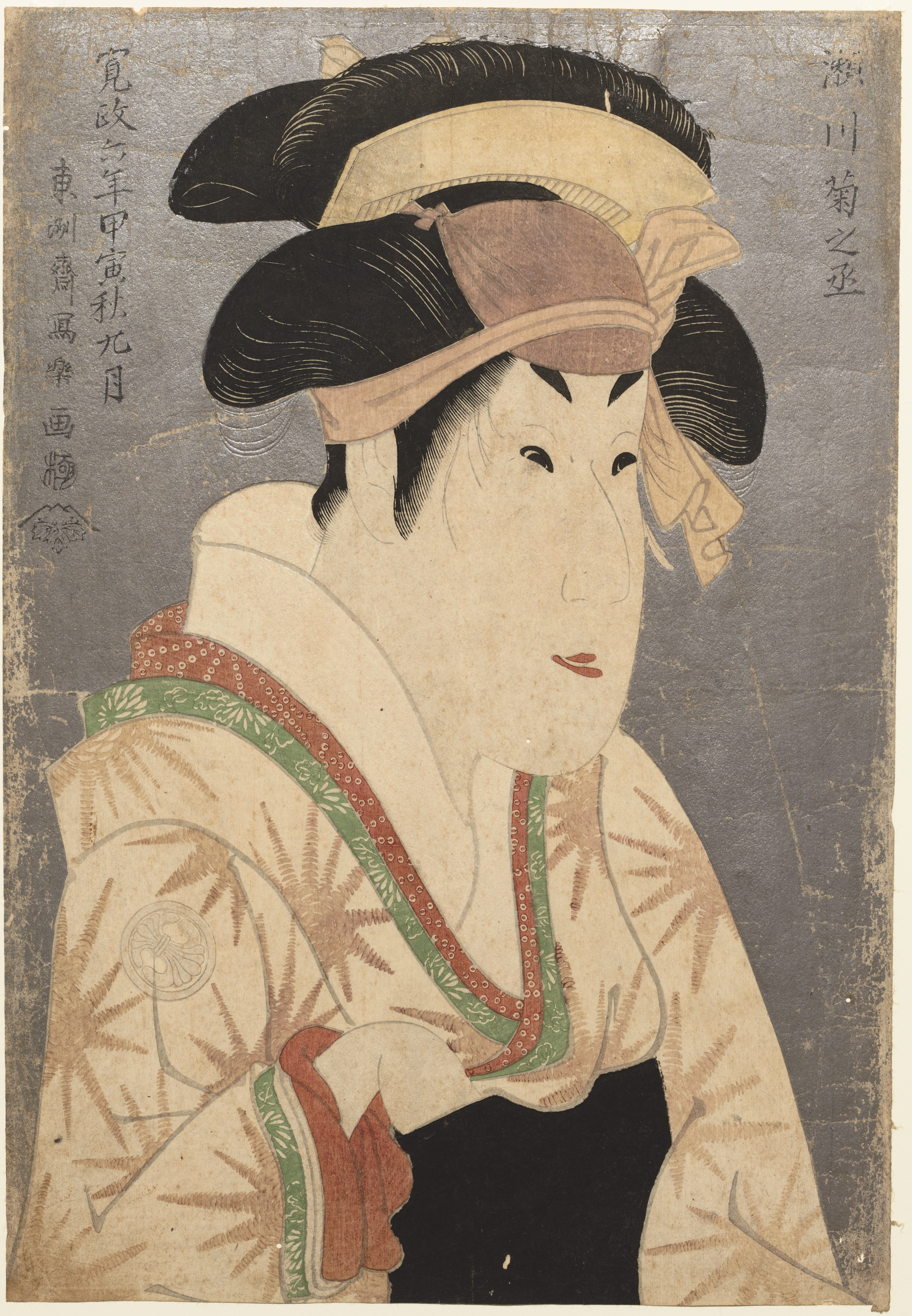

Oshizu is the wife of the Ishii foot-soldier Tanabe Bunzō, who runs into financial ruin in faithful service to his masters. The print depicts Oshizu in the sixth act, as they struggle to repay a usurer and resort to prostituting their daughter Omitsu. She wraps her head in a yamai hachimaki (病鉢巻, "sickness headband"), a purple headband of silk crepe often worn in kabuki to indicate sickness. Above it a yellow comb decorates the hair. The kimono is white with a faded violet pattern, under which are green and rose garments, all bound with a black obi sash. The portrait is on a dark mica background, and mica is dusted on the collar.

16 copies are known of the ōban print of Segawa Kikunojō III as Oshizu, wife of Tanabe (三世瀬川菊之丞の田辺文蔵妻おしづ Sansei Segawa Kikujurō no Tanabe Bunzō Oshizu); one each in the collection of the Tokyo National Museum, the Hagi Uragami Museum, Hiraki Ukiyo-e Foundation, the British Museum, the Bibliothèque nationale de France, the Museum of Fine Arts, Boston, the Art Institute of Chicago, the Edoardo Chiossone Museum of Oriental Art, the Guimet Museum, the Harvard Art Museums, the Museum Five Continents, the Philadelphia Museum of Art, and the Museum of Applied Arts, Vienna; and three are in private collections.

==== Ichikawa Yaozō III as Tanabe Bunzō ====
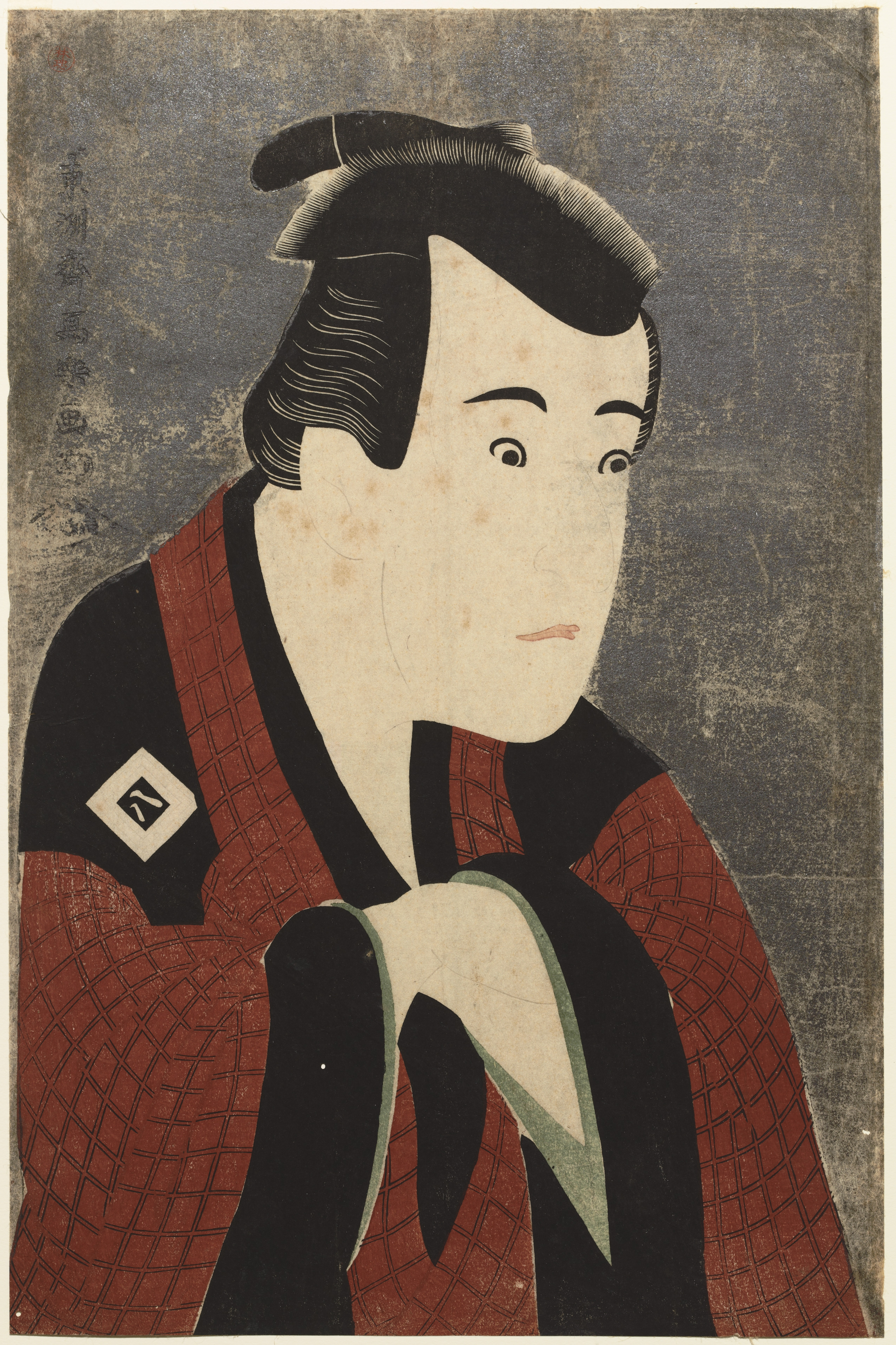

Bunzō is an Ishii retainer who devoted himself to the brothers' revenge. In the third act, at the Abe River in Suruga Province in the third act, Mizuemon's group fends off Genzō's group, kills Genzō and his wife, and cripples Bunzō with a wound to the leg. The print depicts Bunzō in the sixth act as an impoverished rōnin at the Ishibe-juku in Ōmi Province.

11 copies are known of the ōban print of Ichikawa Yaozō III as Tanabe Bunzō (三世市川八百蔵の田辺文蔵 Sansei Ichikawa Yaozō no Tanabe Bunzō); one each in the collection of the Tokyo National Museum, the Hiraki Ukiyo-e Foundation, the British Museum, the Museum of Fine Arts, Boston, the Royal Museums of Art and History, the Art Institute of Chicago, the Grabhorn Collection at the Asian Art Museum of San Francisco, the Guimet Museum, the Honolulu Museum of Art, and the Harvard Art Museums; and one is in a private collection.

==== Arashi Ryūzō II as Ishibe Kinkichi the moneylender ====
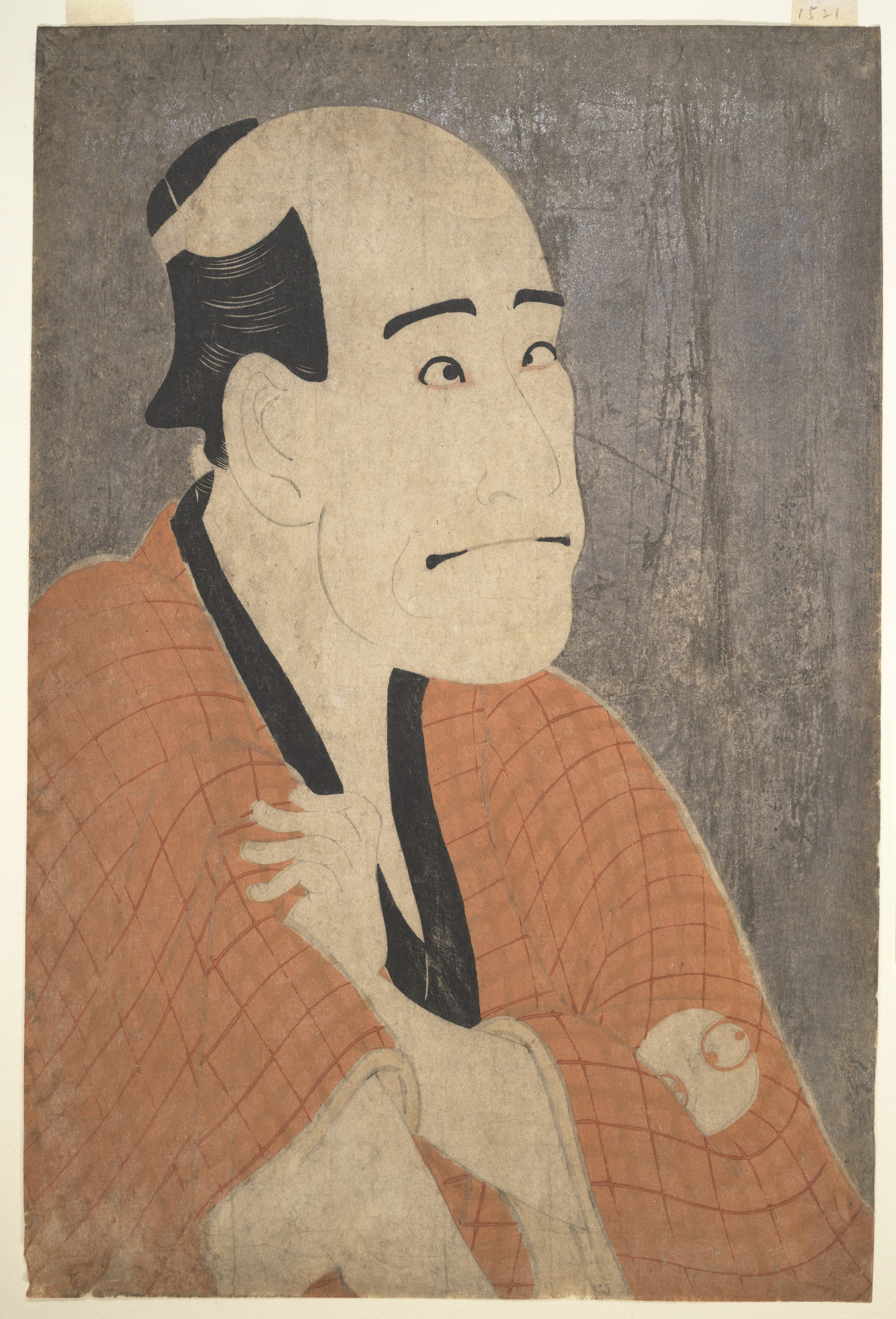

The name "Ishibe Kinkichi" is used as a common noun in Japanese to refer to a person with an inflexible character; the play's character, a moneylender at Ishibe-juku in Ōmi Province, has a personality lacking in humanity and empathy. In the sixth act, when the destitute Tanabe Bunzō and his wife Oshizu are unable to repay a debt to him, Kinkichi has them sell him their daughter Omitsu as a prostitute. The actor Ryūzō was known as a master of villainous rôles, and Sharaku's print expresses his hard, unempathetic character in this scene.

22 copies are known of the ōban print of Arashi Ryūzō II as Ishibe Kinkichi the moneylender (二世嵐竜蔵の金貸石部金吉 Nisei Arashi Ryūzō no Kanekashi Ishibe Kinkichi). One each are in the collections of the Tokyo National Museum, Jōsai University, the Hiraki Ukiyo-e Foundation, the Yamatane Museum, the British Museum, the Brooklyn Museum, the Royal Museums of Art and History, the Art Institute of Chicago, the Guimet Museum, the Honolulu Museum of Art, the Harvard Art Museums, the Museum of East Asian Art, Cologne, the Minneapolis Institute of Art, the Metropolitan Museum of Art, and the Yale University Art Gallery; two are in the collection of the Museum of Fine Arts, Boston; and four are in private collections. It holds the record auction price for a Sharaku print; it sold for €389000 at Piasa in Paris in 2009. It had earlier sold at Sotheby's in 1975 for US$25000 and in 1989 at Christie's for GBP£22000.

==== Segawa Tomisaburō II as Yadorigi, wife of Ōgishi Kurando, and Nakamura Man'yo as the chambermaid Wakakusa ====
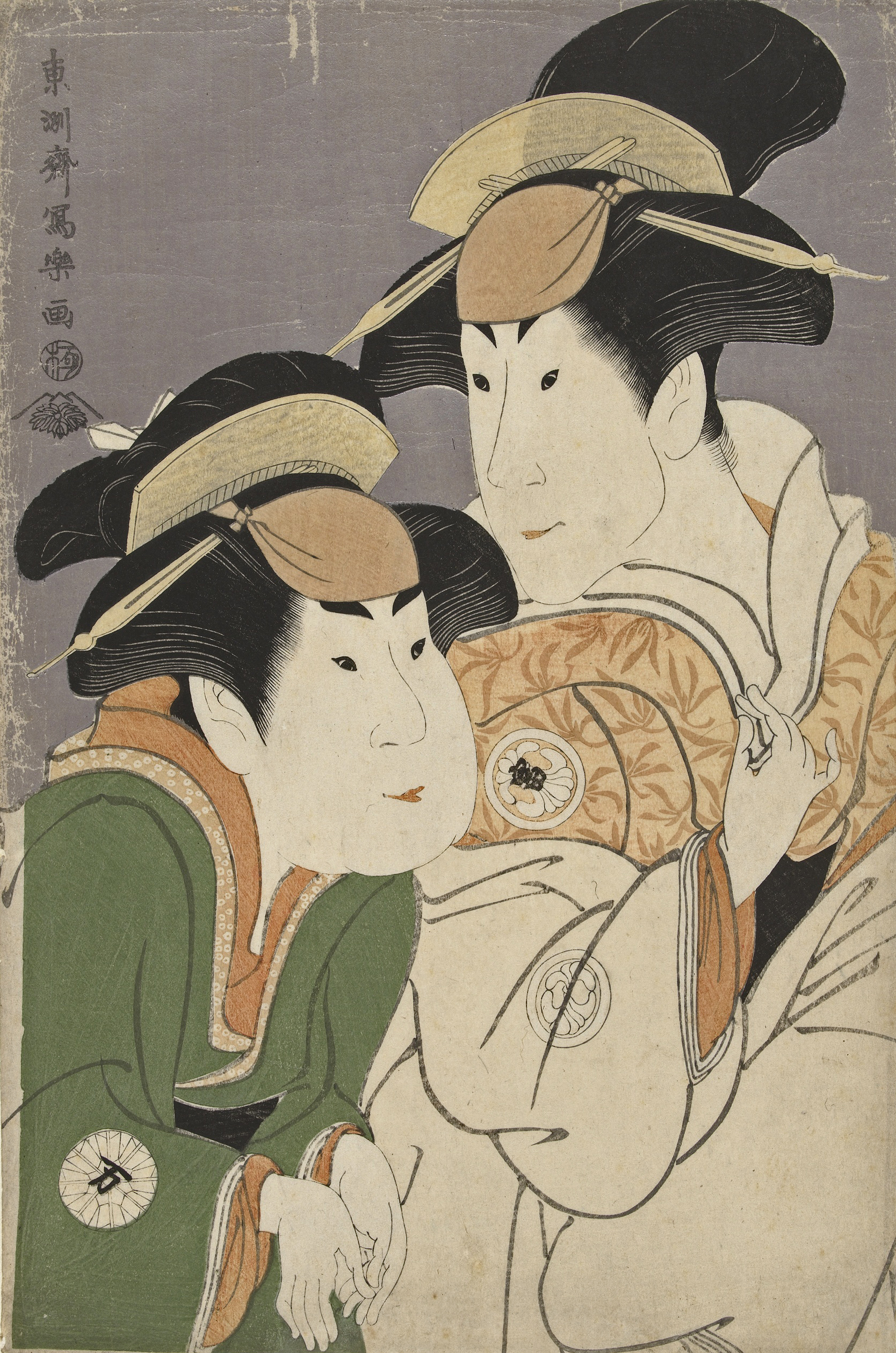

The scene is from the seventh act, at the Ōgishi manor below Kameyama Castle. The print contrasts Tomisaburō's slender face with the jowly Man'yo.

7 copies are known of the ōban print of Segawa Tomisaburō II as Yadorigi, wife of Ōgishi Kurando, and Nakamura Man'yo as the chambermaid Wakakusa (二世瀬川富三郎の大岸蔵人妻やどり木と中村万世の腰元若草 Nisei Segawa Tomisaburō no Ōgishi Kurando tsuma Yadorigi to Nakamura Man'yo no koshimoto Wakakusa). One each is in the collections of the Tokyo National Museum, the Hiraki Ukiyo-e Foundation, the Rijksmuseum, the Museum of Fine Arts, Boston, the Art Institute of Chicago, the Dutch National Museum of Ethnology, and the Metropolitan Museum of Art.

==== Segawa Tomisaburō II as Yadorigi, wife of Ōgishi Kurando ====
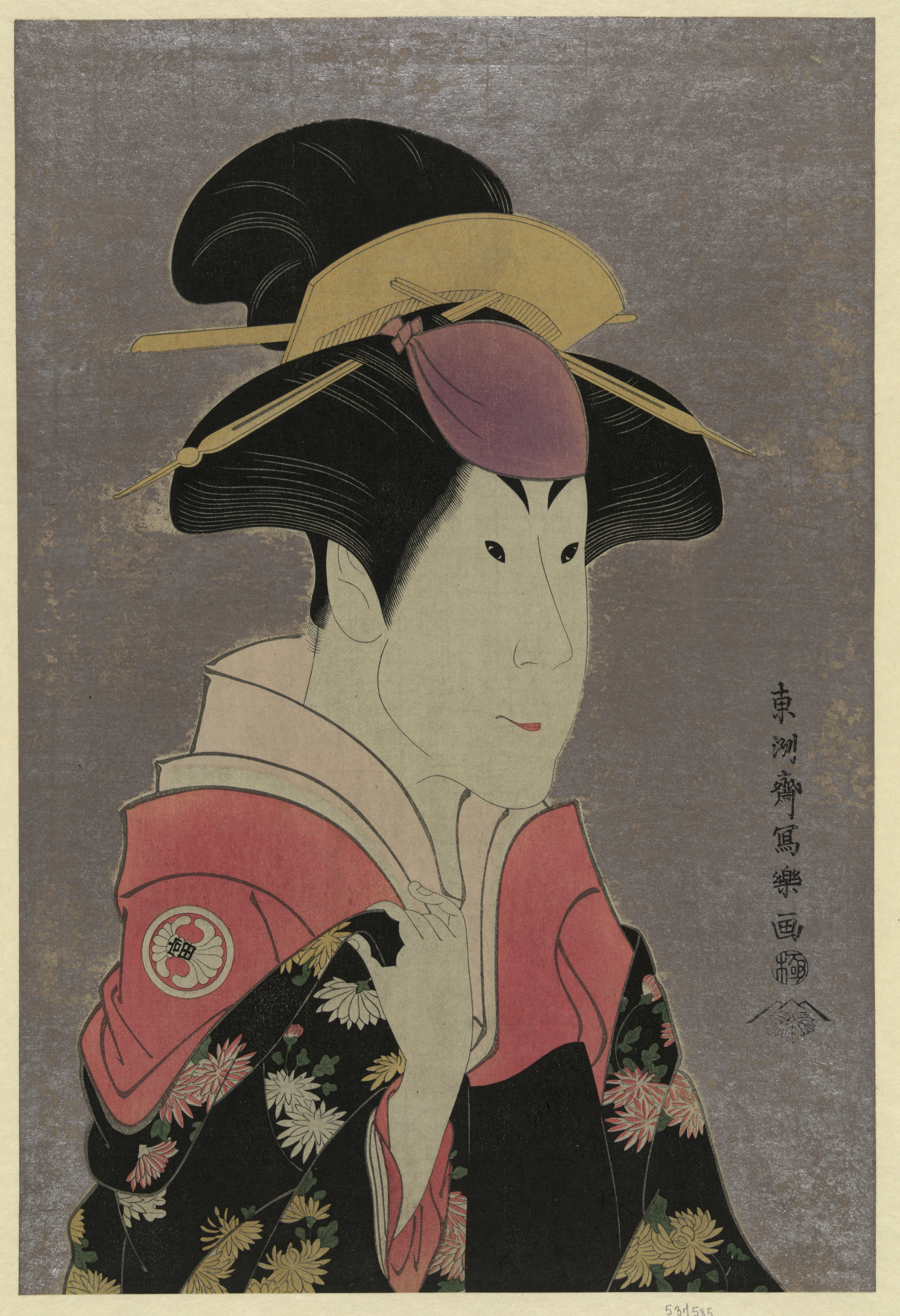

Tomisaburō was a student of Segawa Kikunojō III, whose style as an onnagata he imitated. He was considered a versatile actor who excelled at rôles as young girls and courtesans, but who lack in social graces, for which he was given nicknames such as Iya-Tomi or Niku-Tomi (both roughly "Horrid Tomi").

It is not known what scene this image represents, but it is assumed to be a different one from that of the other portrait of Yadorigi, as her clothes are different. Some have suggested the scene may be from Act 5.

10 copies are known of the ōban print of Segawa Tomisaburō II as Yadorigi, wife of Ōgishi Kurando (二世瀬川富三郎の大岸蔵人妻やどり木 Nisei Segawa Tomisaburō no Ōgishi Kurando tsuma Yadorigi); one each are in the collections of the Tokyo National Museum, the Hagi Uragami Museum, Jōsai University, the British Museum, the Museum of Fine Arts, Boston, the Royal Museums of Art and History, the Art Institute of Chicago, and the Metropolitan Museum of Art, and two at the Guimet Museum.

=== Katakiuchi Noriai-banashi ===
Katakiuchi Noriai-banashi (敵討乗合話, "A Medley of Tales of Revenge") by the playwright Sakurada Jisuke débuted at the Kiri-za in the 5th month of the 6th year of Kansei. The play combines two revenge tales: Katakiuchi Ganryūjima (巌流島, "Ganryū-jima Revenge") and Gotaiheiki Shiroishi Banashi (碁太平記白石噺, "The Tale of Shiroishi and the Taihei Chronicles"). The play's villain Shiga Daishichi murders Matsushita Mikinoshin, whose death his daughters Miyagino and Shinobu spend years to avenge, with the help of Gorobē, a fishmonger of San'ya.

==== Onoe Matsusuke I as Matsushita Mikinoshin ====
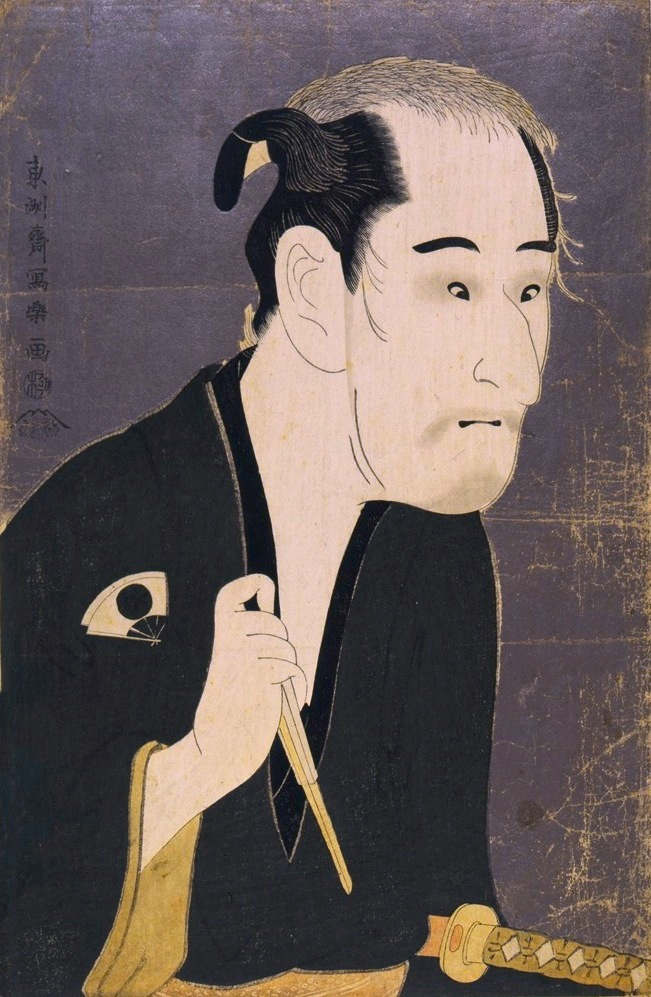

Mikinoshin is a rōnin who has fallen sick and fallen into poverty; he is the father of two daughters, Miyagino and Shinobu. Sharaku depicts him in a miserable state here in the third act, in which the villains Shiga Daishichi and an accomplice murder him. Onoe Matsusuke was best known for his rôles as villains, but performed in this play as the lead protagonist.

ōban print of Onoe Matsusuke I as Matsushita Mikinoshin (初世尾上松助の松下造酒之進 Shosei Onoe Matsusuke no Matsushita Mikinoshin)

==== Ichikawa Komazō III as Shiga Daishichi ====
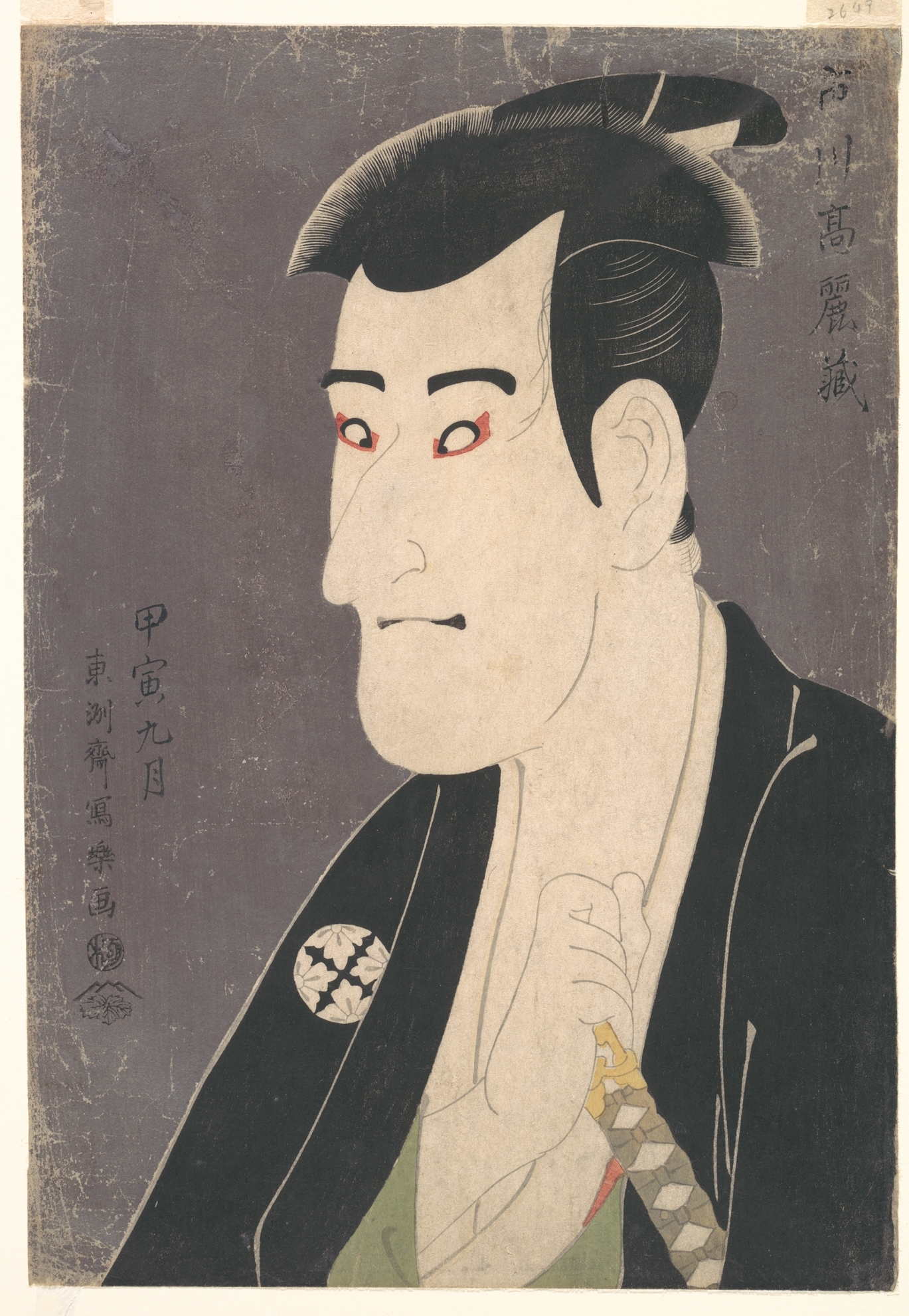

ōban print of Ichikawa Komazō III as Shiga Daishichi (三世市川高麗蔵の志賀大七 Sansei Ichikawa Komazō no Shiga Daishichi)

==== Morita Kan'ya VIII as the palanquin-bearer Uguisu no Jirōsaku ====
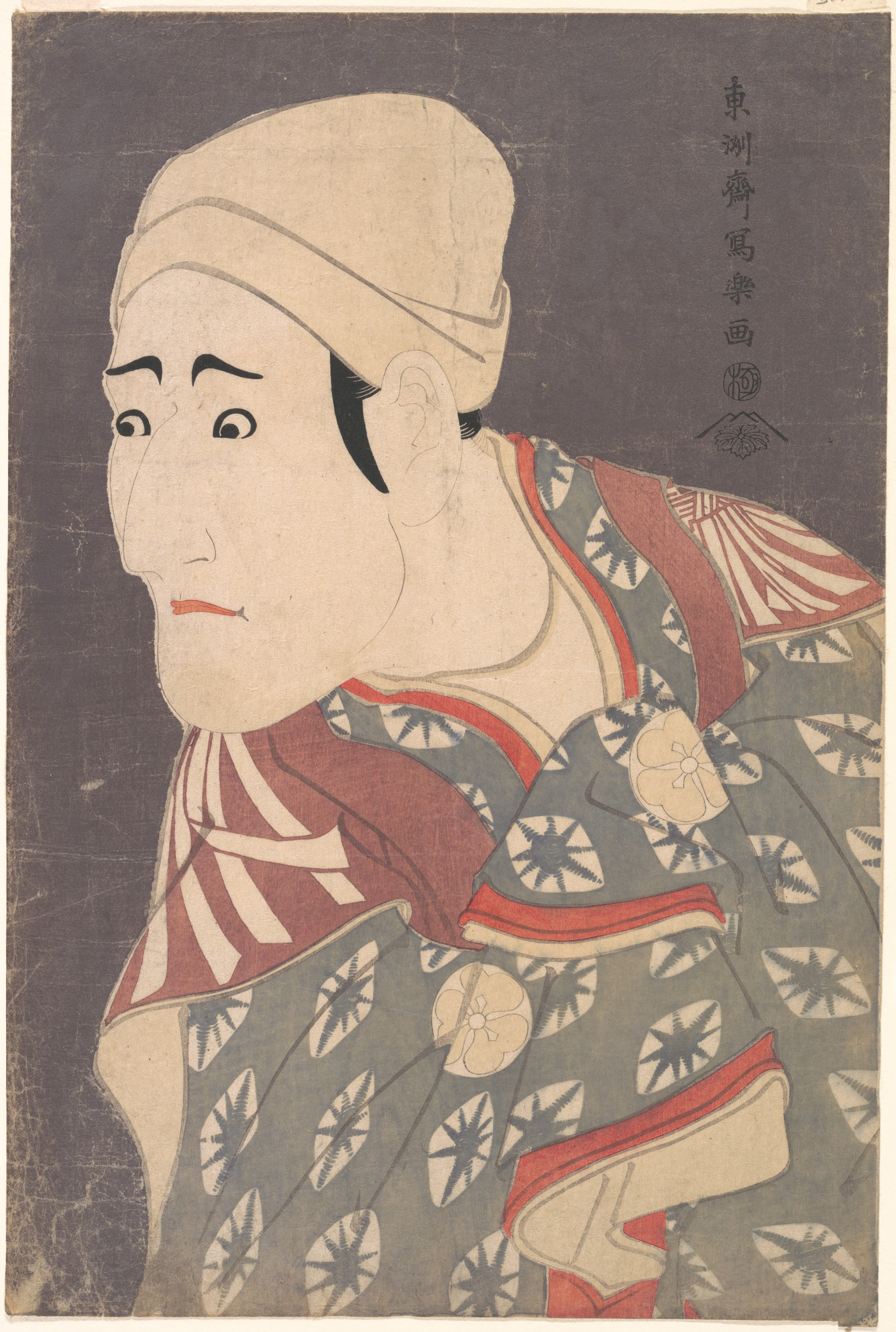

Jirōsaku is Miyagino's palanquin-bearer, and has transported Miyagino to the red-light district to visit his daughter, whom he has sold into prostitution. Jirōsaku appears during the performance of the dance segment "Hana-ayame omoi no kanzashi" (花菖蒲思笄, "Iris Headdress of Remembrance") in the fourth act. He takes the rôle of Japanese bush warbler in the dance, opposite Soga no Jūrō Sukenari disguised as Gorobē as lesser cuckoo; Jūrō is a faithful servant of the Sogas.

9 copies are known of the ōban print of Morita Kan'ya VIII as the palanquin-bearer Uguisu no Jirōsaku (八世森田勘弥の駕篭舁鴬の治郎作 Hassei Morita Kan'ya no kagokaki Uguisu no Jirōsaku); one each is in the collections of the Tokyo National Museum, the Yamatane Museum, the Museum of Asian Art, the British Museum, the Museum of Fine Arts, Boston, the Royal Museums of Art and History, the Guimet Museum, the Metropolitan Museum of Art, and the Allen Memorial Art Museum.

==== Matsumoto Yonesaburō I as Kewaizaka no Shōshō, actually Shinobu ====
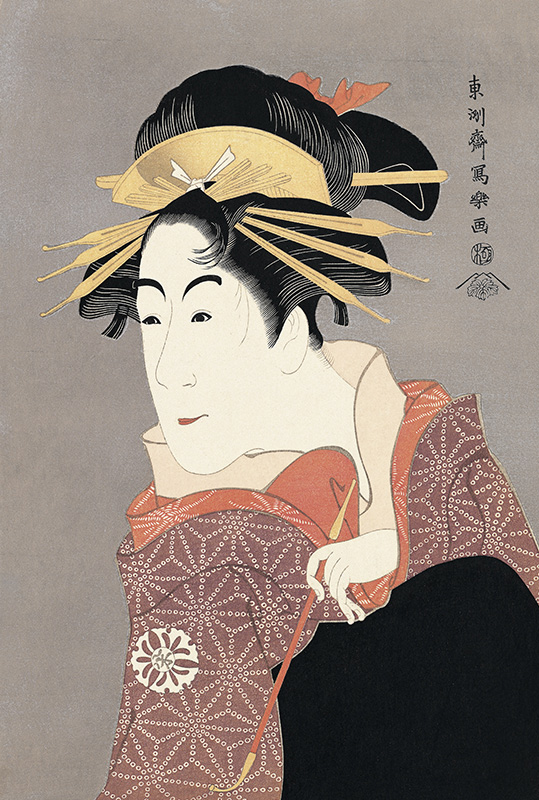

ōban print of Matsumoto Yonesaburō I as Kewaizaka no Shōshō, actually Shinobu (初世松本米三郎の化粧坂の少将、実はしのぶ Shosei Matsumoto Yonesaburō no Kewaizaka no Shōshō, jitsu wa Shinobu)

==== Nakayama Tomisaburō I as Miyagino ====
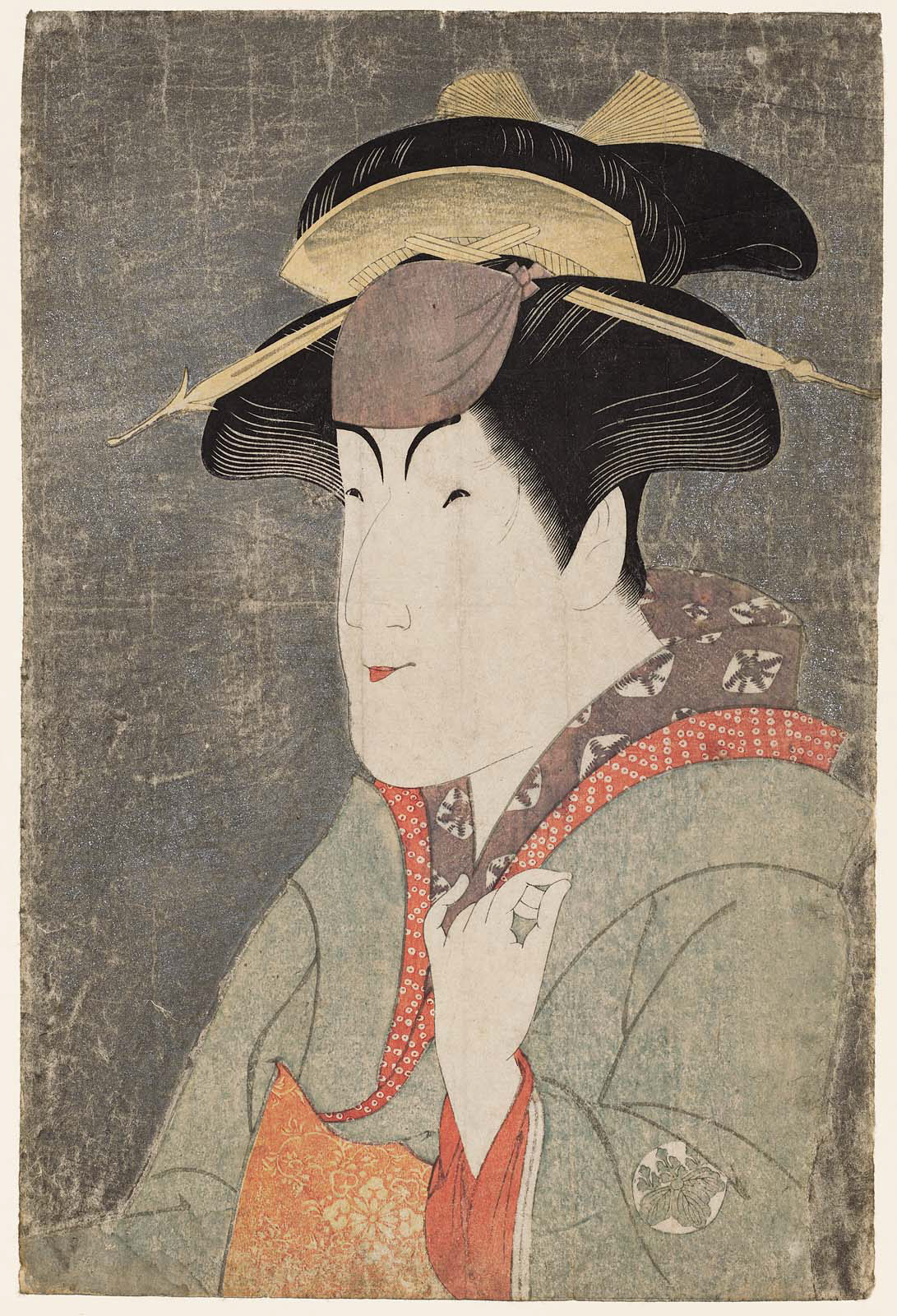

8 copies are known of the ōban print of Nakayama Tomisaburō I as Miyagino (初世中山富三郎の宮城野 Shosei Nakayama Tomisaburō no Miyagino). One each is in the collections of the Tokyo National Museum, the Nara Prefectural Museum of Art, the British Museum, the Museum of Fine Arts, Boston, the Edoardo Chiossone Museum of Oriental Art, the Harvard Art Museums, and the Metropolitan Museum of Art, and another is in a private collection.

==== Matsumoto Kōshirō IV as San'ya no Sakanaya Gorobē ====
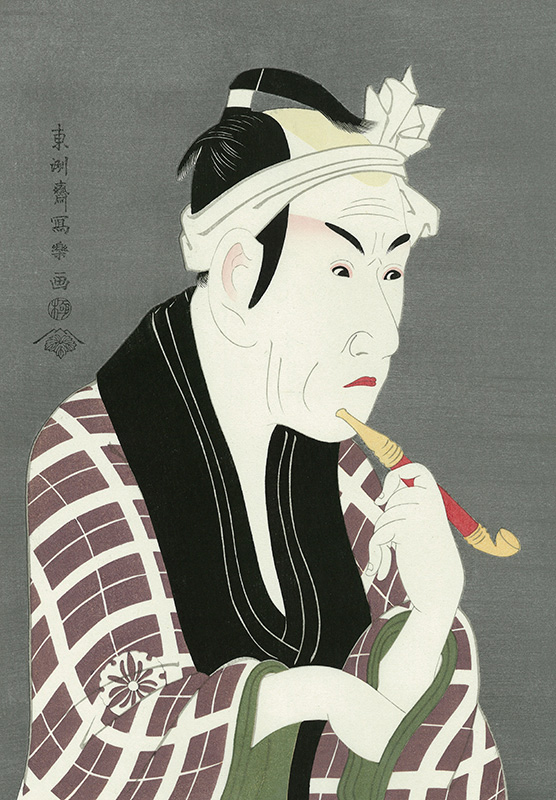

ōban print of Matsumoto Kōshirō IV as San'ya no Sakanaya Gorobē (四世松本幸四郎の山谷の肴屋五郎兵衛 Yonsei Matsumoto Kōshirō no San'ya no Sakanaya Gorobē)

==== Nakajima Wadaemon I as Bōdara Chōzaemon and Nakamura Konozō I as Gon of the Kanagawaya ====
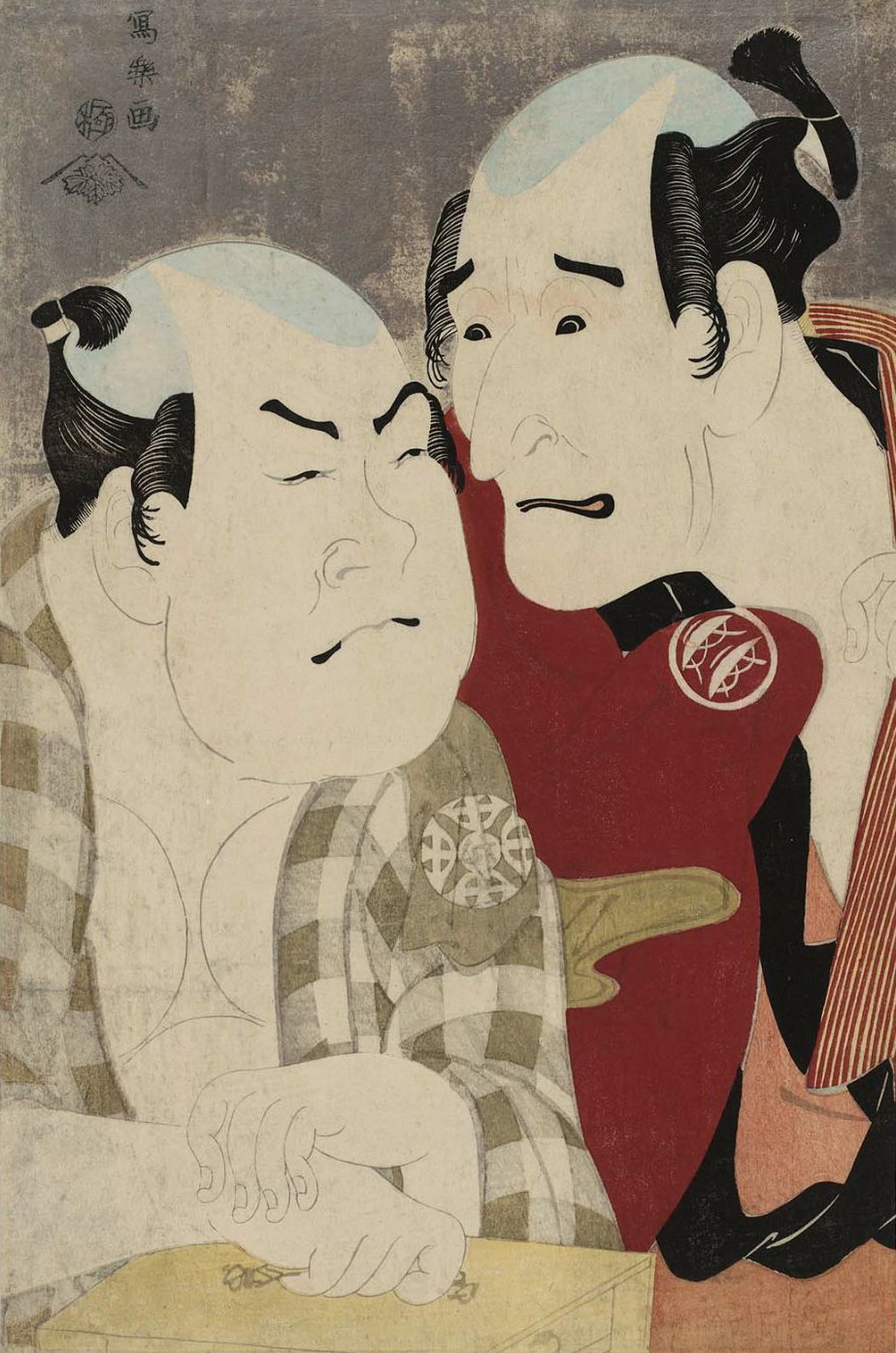

ōban print of Nakajima Wadaemon I as Bōdara Chōzaemon and Nakamura Konozō I as Gon of the Kanagawaya (初世中島和田右衛門のぼうだら長左衛門と初世中村此蔵の船宿かな川やの権 Shosei Nakajima Wadaemon no Bōdara Chōzaemon to Shosei Nakamura Konozō no Kanagawaya no Gon)

There are few details about Bōdara Chōzaemon and Gon of the Kanagawaya, who appear together in this print, but they are said to have been minor characters in Katakiuchi Noriai-banashi. Sharaku has nonetheless delineated their traits as carefully as he has those of the main characters.

=== Koi Nyōbō Somewake Tazuna ===
Koi Nyōbō Somewake Tazuna (恋女房染分手綱, "The Loving Wife's Particoloured Reins") débuted in 1751 in Osaka as a bunraku puppet play and arrived in Edo later the same year as a kabuki play at the Nakamura-za (later called the Miyako-za).

The scene focuses on the adulterous relationship of Date no Yosaku, who is a retainer of the Yurugi clan of Tanba Province, and the woman-in-waiting Shigenoi. Trouble befalls the couple at the hands of those such as the wicked retainer Washizuka Happeiji, who has the manservant Edobei steal public funds from Yosaku. Shigenoi gives birth to Yosaku's son, and her father, the Noh master Takemura Sadanoshin, takes responsibility by killing himself by seppuku. The Yurugi daimyō takes in Shigenoi as a wet nurse for his daughter Shirabe-hime, but she is forced to part with Yosaku and their son. Amongst the other characters Sharaku depicts are the Yurugi house's messenger Sagisaka Sanai, Yosaku's manservant Ippei; the character Osagawa Tsuneyo II plays is not certain, but may be Ippei's sister Osan.

==== Ichikawa Omezō I as the manservant Ippei ====
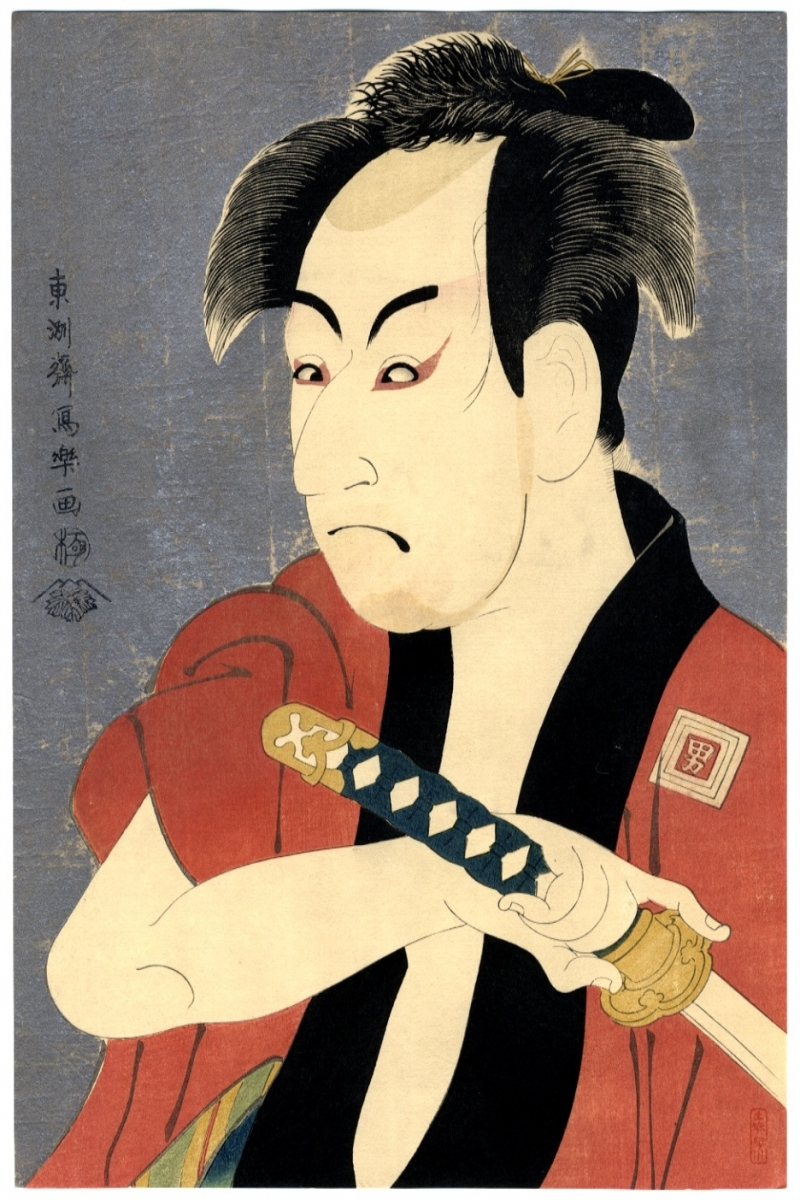

ōban print of Ichikawa Omezō I as the manservant (yakko) Ippei (初世市川男女蔵の奴一平 Ichikawa Omezō no yakko Ippei)

==== Ōtani Oniji III as the manservant Edobei ====
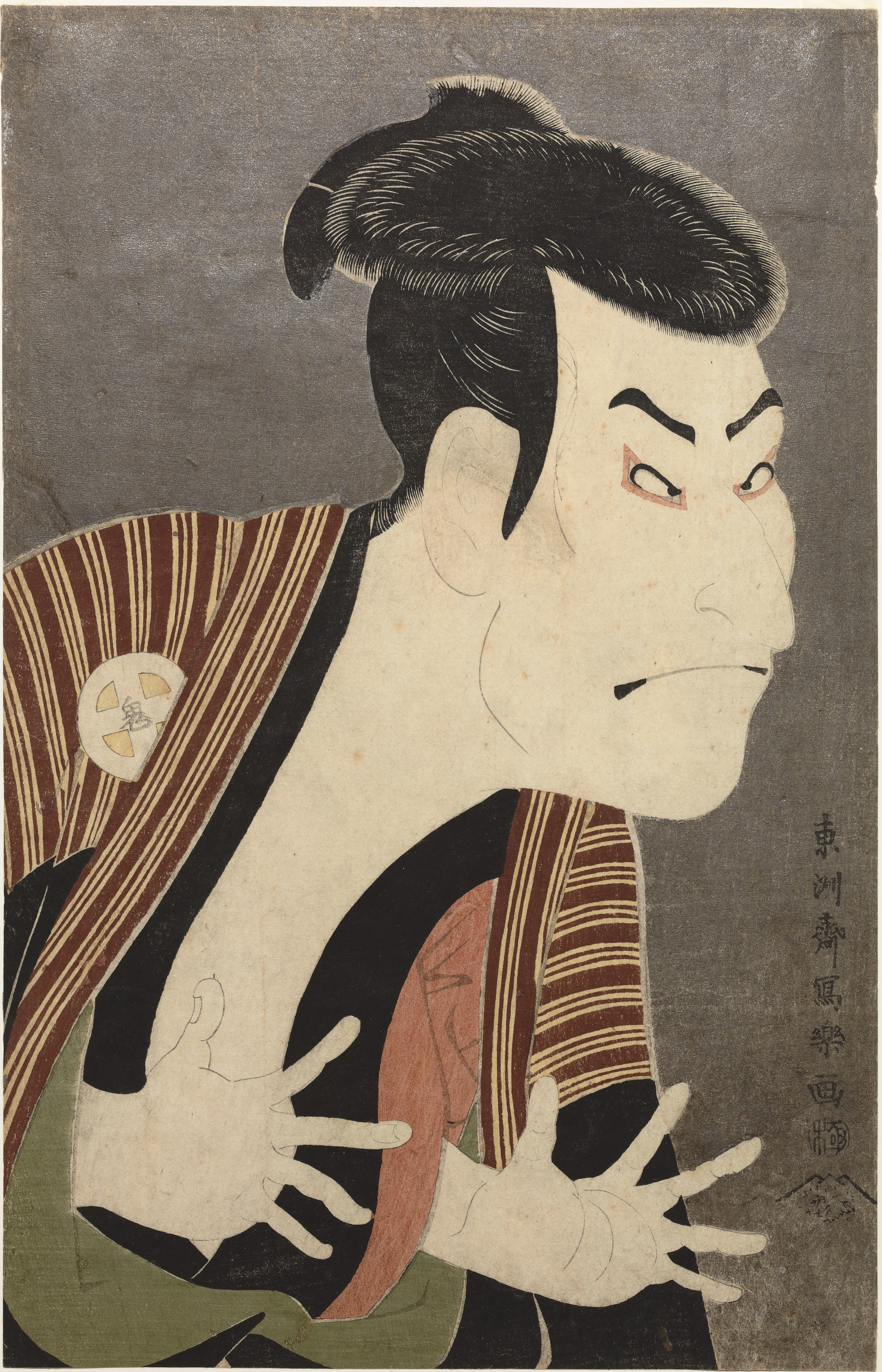

ōban print of Ōtani Oniji III as the manservant Edobei (三世大谷鬼次の奴江戸兵衛 Sansei Ōtani Oniji no yakko Edobei)

Later in the year, Ōtani Oniji III succeeded to the stage name of Nakamura Nakazō I and became Nakamura Nakazō II. He performed in Uruō Toshi Meika no Homare and appears in Sharaku's print of Nakamura Nakazō II as Saizō Saiwaka.

==== Iwai Hanshirō IV as the wet nurse Shigenoi ====
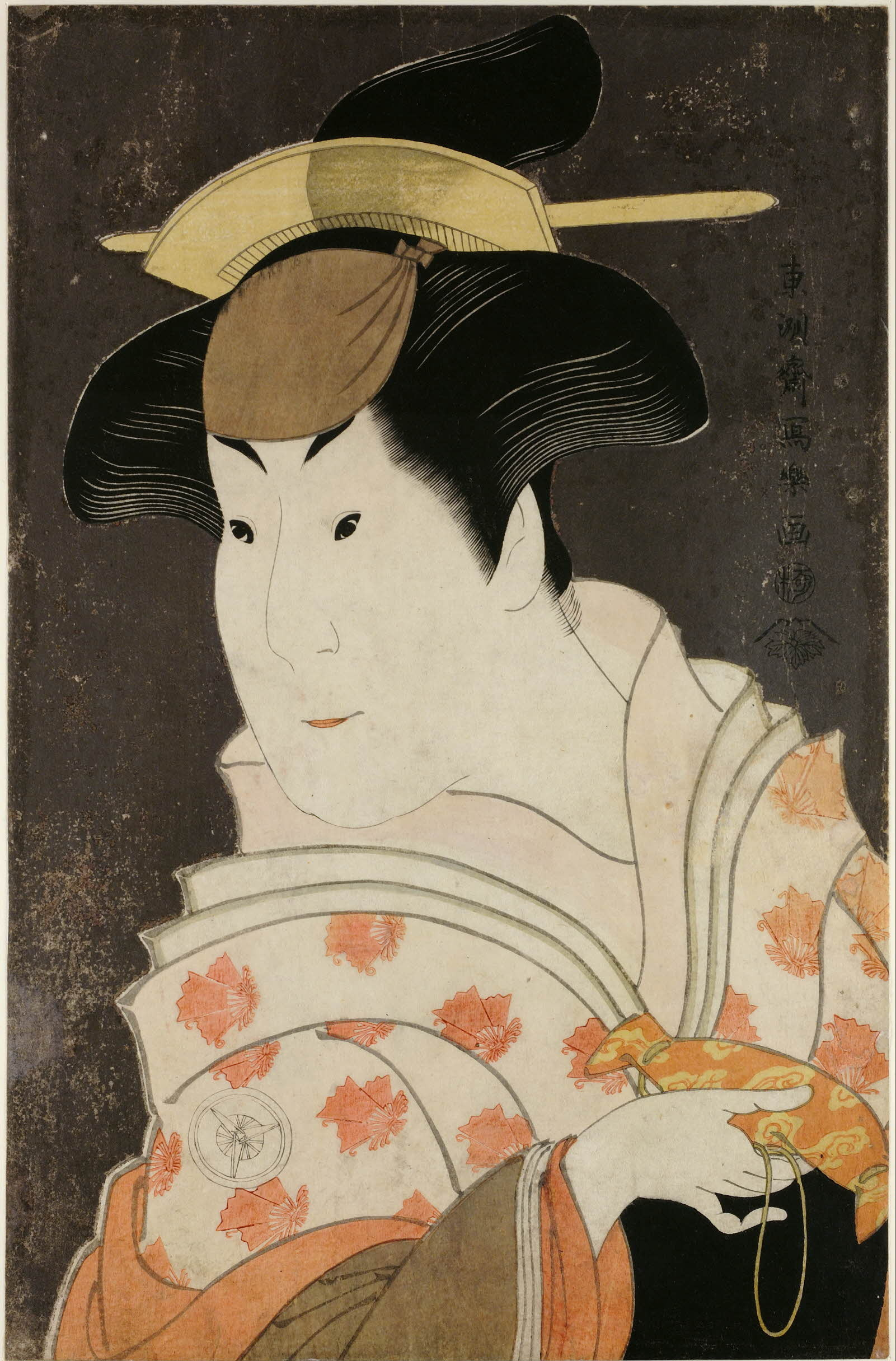

ōban print of Iwai Hanshirō IV as the wet nurse Shigenoi (四世岩井半四郎の乳人重の井 Yonsei Iwai Hanshirō no menoto Shigenoi)

==== Ichikawa Monnosuke II as Date no Yosaku ====
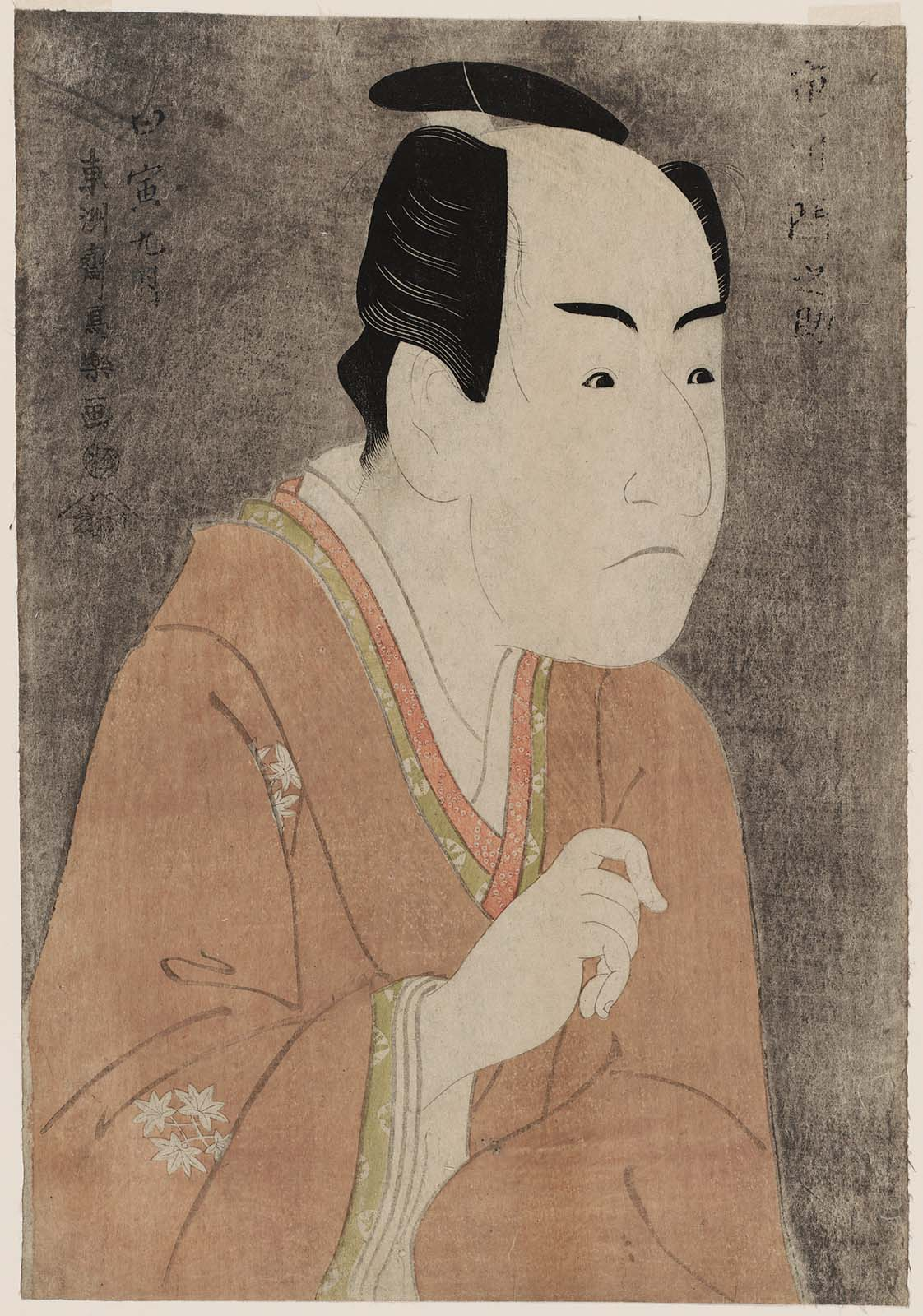

ōban print of Ichikawa Monnosuke II as Date no Yosaku (二世市川門之助の伊達与作 Ichikawa Monnosuke no Date no Yosaku)

==== Bandō Hikosaburō III as Sagisaka Sanai ====
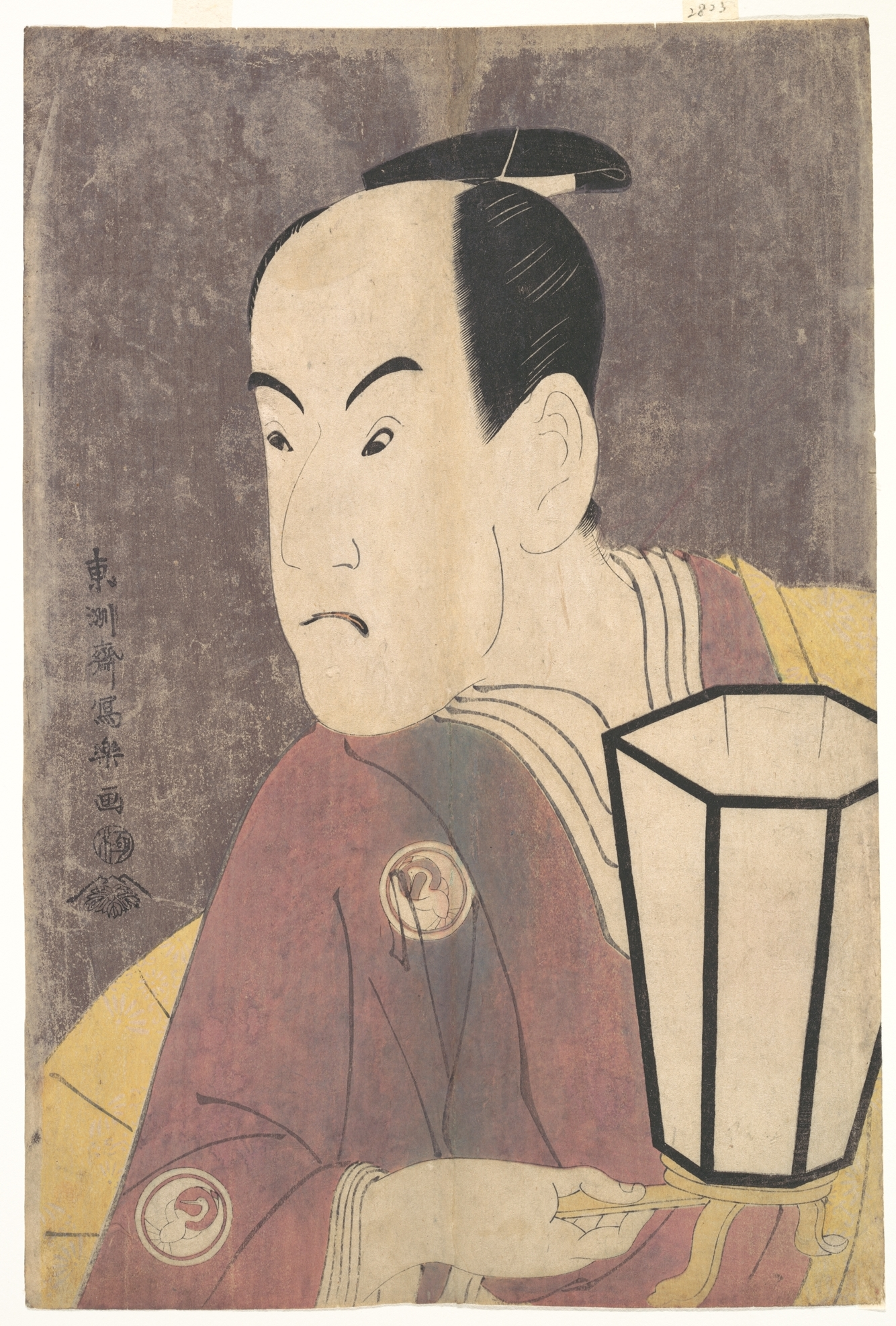

ōban print of Bandō Hikosaburō III as Sagisaka Sanai (三代目坂東彦三郎の鷺坂左内 Sansei Bandō Hikosaburō no Sagisaka Sanai)

==== Tanimura Torazō I as Washizuka Happeiji ====
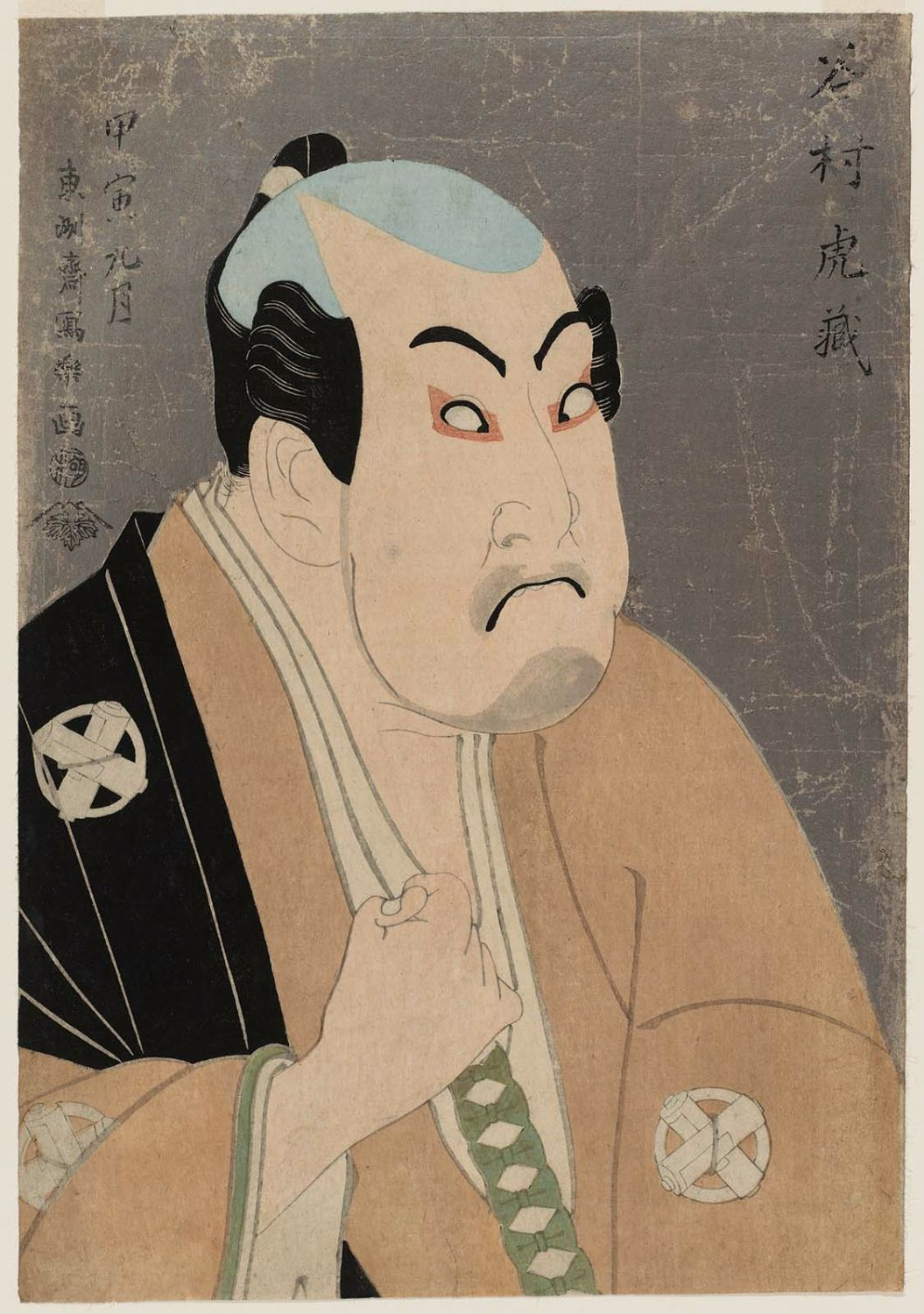

ōban print of Tanimura Torazō I as Washizuka Happeiji (谷村虎蔵の鷲塚八平次 Shosei Tanimura Torazō no Washizuka Happeiji)

==== Ichikawa Ebizō I as Takemura Sadanoshin ====
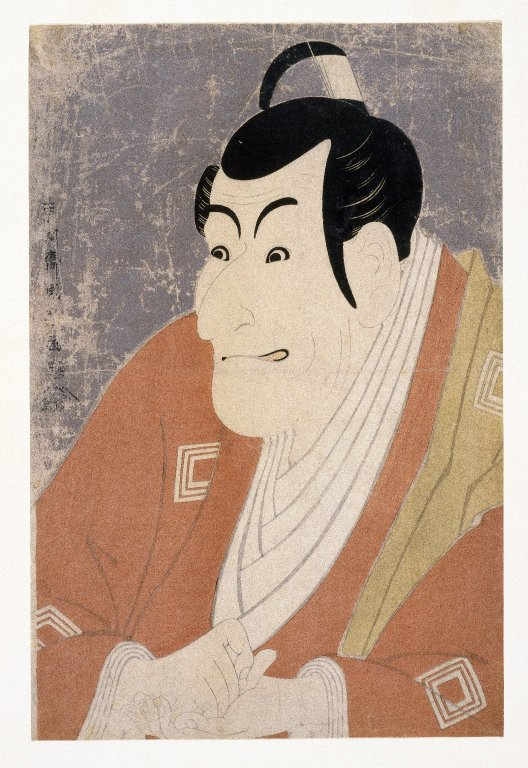

ōban print of Ichikawa Ebizō I as Takemura Sadanoshin (市川鰕蔵の竹村定之進 Shosei Ichikawa Ebizō no Takemura Sadanoshin)

==== Osagawa Tsuneyo II as Ippei's sister Osan ====
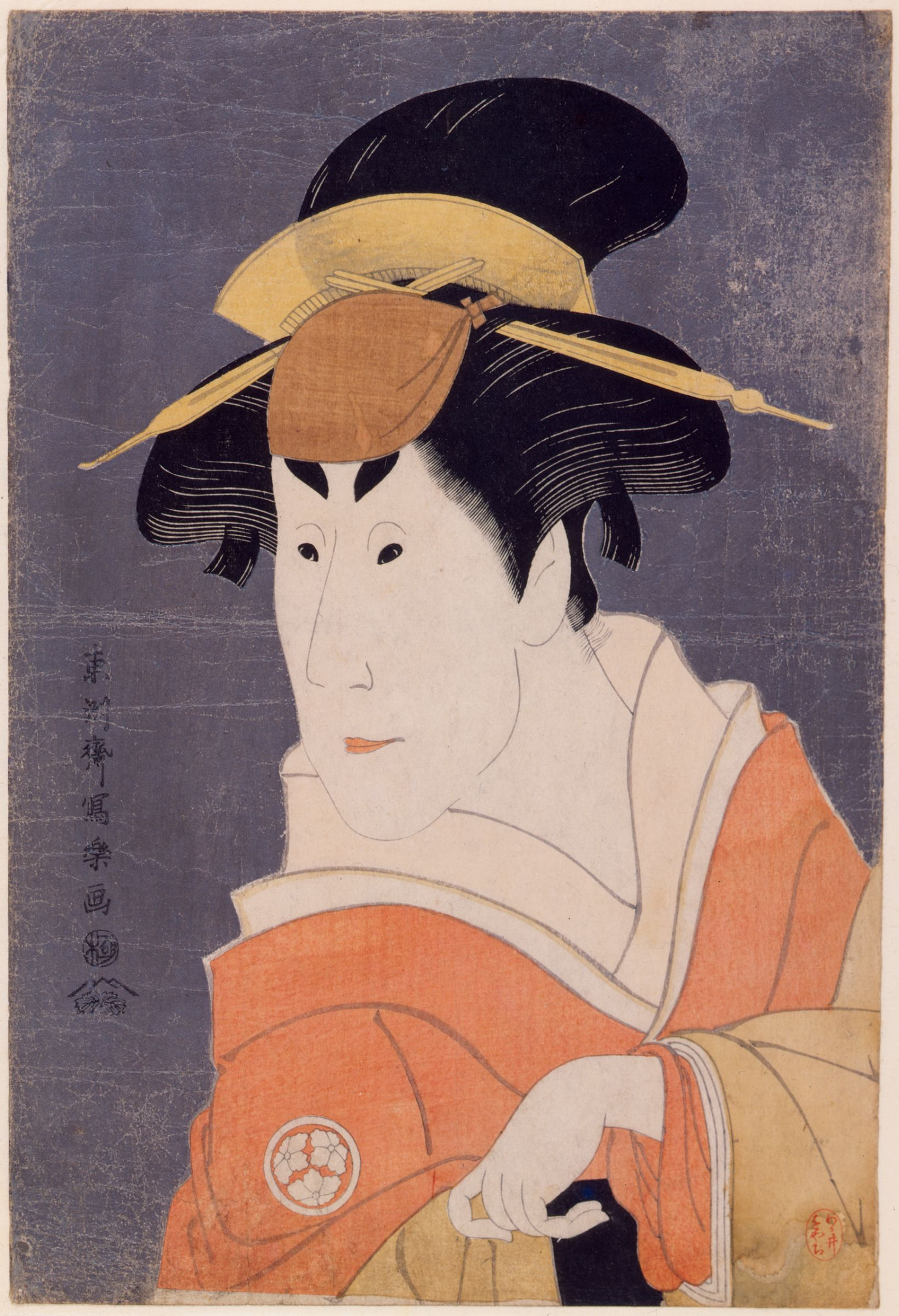

ōban print of Osagawa Tsuneyo II as Ippei's sister Osan (二世小佐川常世の一平姉おさん Nisei Osagawa Tsuneyo no Ippei ane Osan)

==== Iwai Kiyotarō I as Fujinami, wife of Sagisaka Sanai, and Bandō Zenji I as Kozasa, wife of Washizuka Kandayū ====
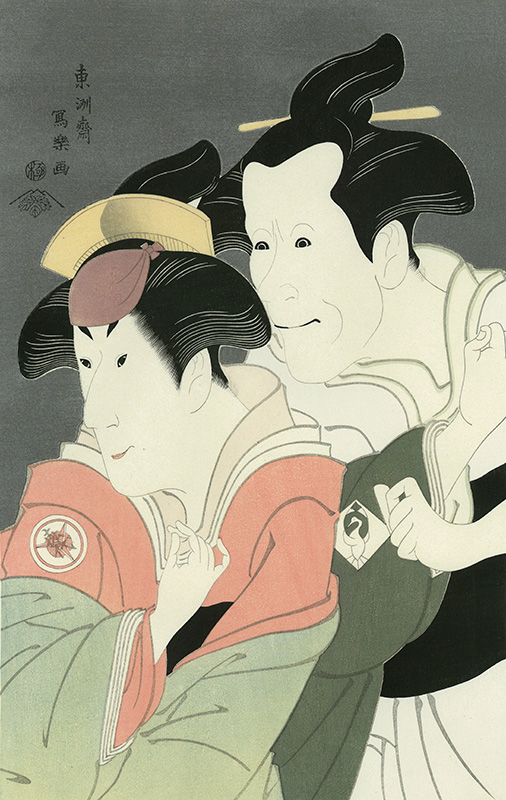

ōban print of Iwai Kiyotarō I as Fujinami, wife of Sagisaka Sanai, and Bandō Zenji I as Kozasa, wife of Washizuka Kandayū (初世岩井喜代太郎の鷺坂左内妻藤波と初世坂東善次の鷲塚官太夫妻小笹 Shosei Iwai Kiyotarō no Sagisaka Sanai tsuma Fujinami to Bandō Zenji no Washizuka Kandayū tsuma Kozasa)

=== Yoshitsune Senbon-zakura ===
==== Sawamura Yodogorō II as Kawatsura Hōgen and Bandō Zenji I as Oni Sadobō ====
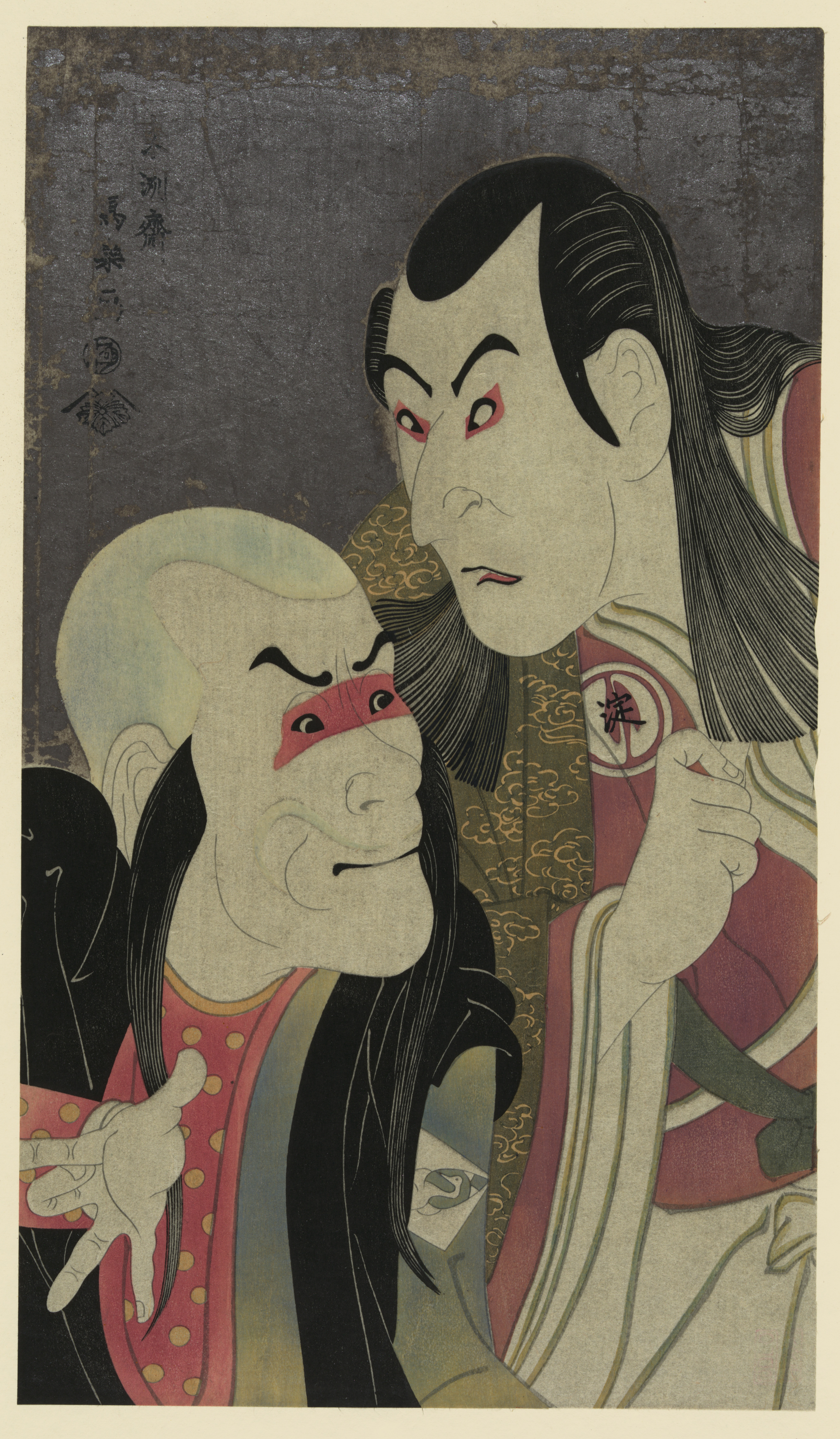

ōban print of Sawamura Yodogorō II as Kawatsura Hōgen and Bandō Zenji I as Oni Sadobō (二代目沢村淀五郎の川連法眼と坂東善次の鬼佐渡坊 Nisei Sawamura Yodogorō no Kawatsura Hōgen to Shosei Bandō Zenji no Oni Sadobō)

== Second period ==
=== Shinozuka Uraemon I as the announcer at Miyako-za ===
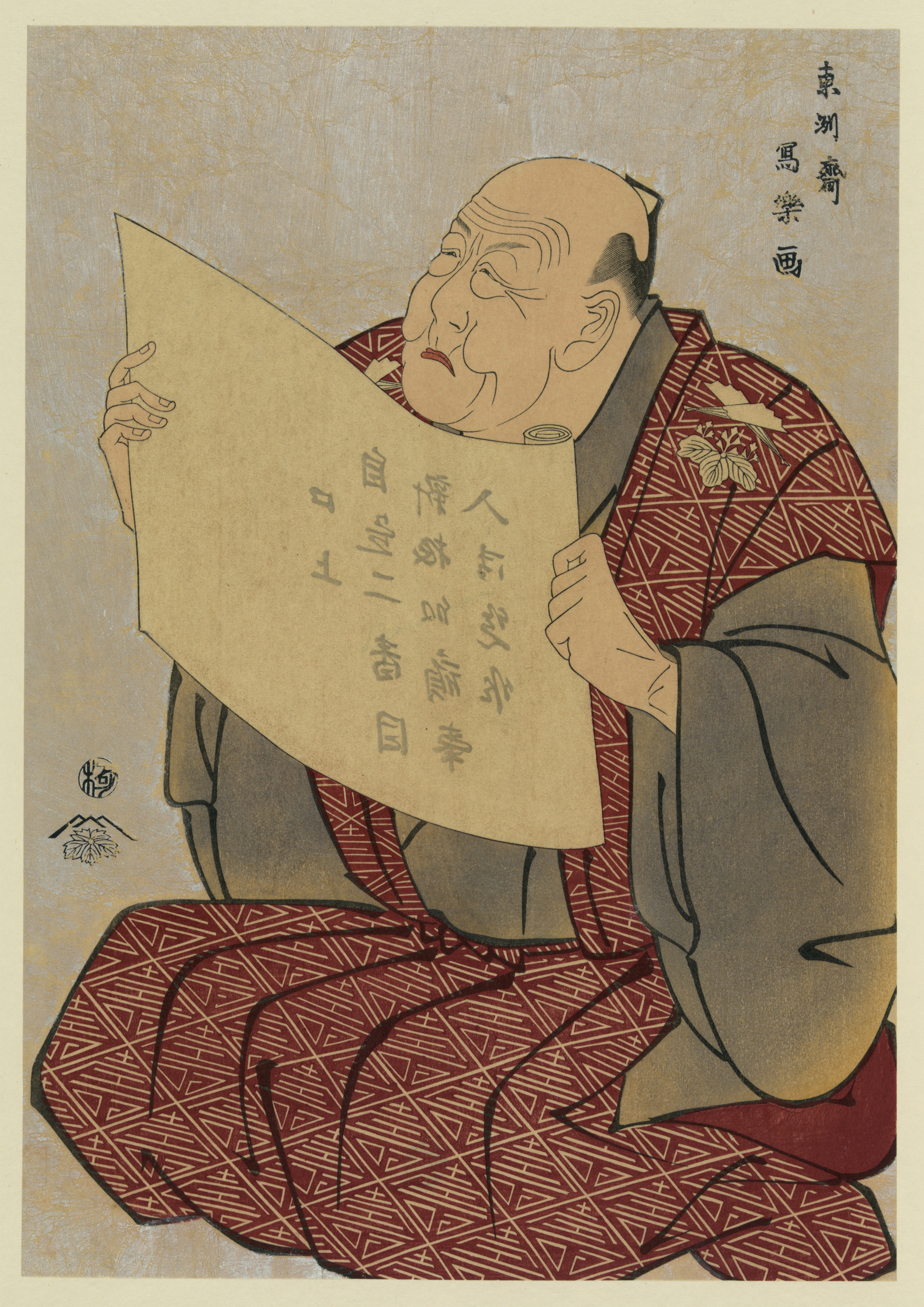

Before a performance and between scenes, a backstage representative or one of the actors came onstage to give a kōjō (口上) announcement to the audience about such things as scene changes, actors' name changes, and actor promotions. Here, the actor Shinozuka Uraemon I wears the Miyako-za mon crest on his sleeve and reads an announcement that bleeds through the scroll he holds. It reads:

口上 自是二番目 新板似顔奉 入御覧候
Kōjō: Kore yori nibanme shinban nigao goran ni ire tamatsuri sōrō
Kōjō: We will show you part two of the newly published actors' portraits.

Seven copies are known Shinozuka Uraemon I as the announcer at Miyako-za (篠塚浦右衛門の都座口上 Shinozuka Uraemon no Miyako-za Kōjō); one each are in the Tokyo National Museum, the British Museum, the Bibliothèque nationale de France, the Museum of Fine Arts, Boston, the Royal Museums of Art and History, the Art Institute of Chicago, and the Metropolitan Museum of Art. Copies exist of a different state that lacks the writing on the scroll.

=== Keisei Sanbon Karakasa ===
==== Yamashina Shirōjūrō as Nagoya Sanzaemon ====
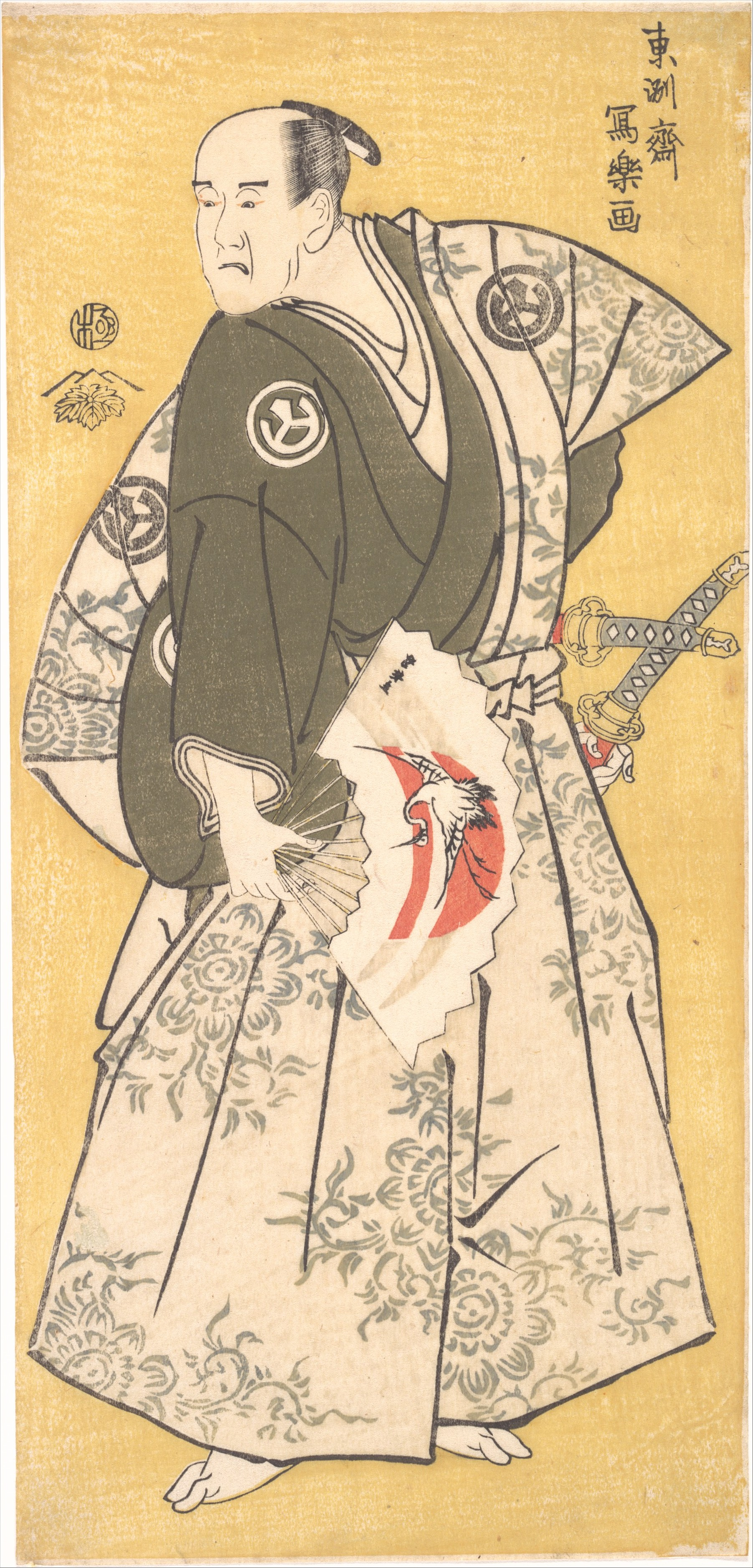

Three copies are known of the hosoban print of Yamashina Shirōjūrō as Nagoya Sanzaemon (山科四郎十郎の名護屋三左衛門 Yamashina Shirōjūrō no Nagoya Sanzaemon), one each in the collections of the Art Institute of Chicago, the Grabhorn Collection at the Asian Art Museum of San Francisco, and the Metropolitan Museum of Art.

==== Sanokawa Ichimatsu III as Sekinoto, wife of Fuwa Benzaemon ====
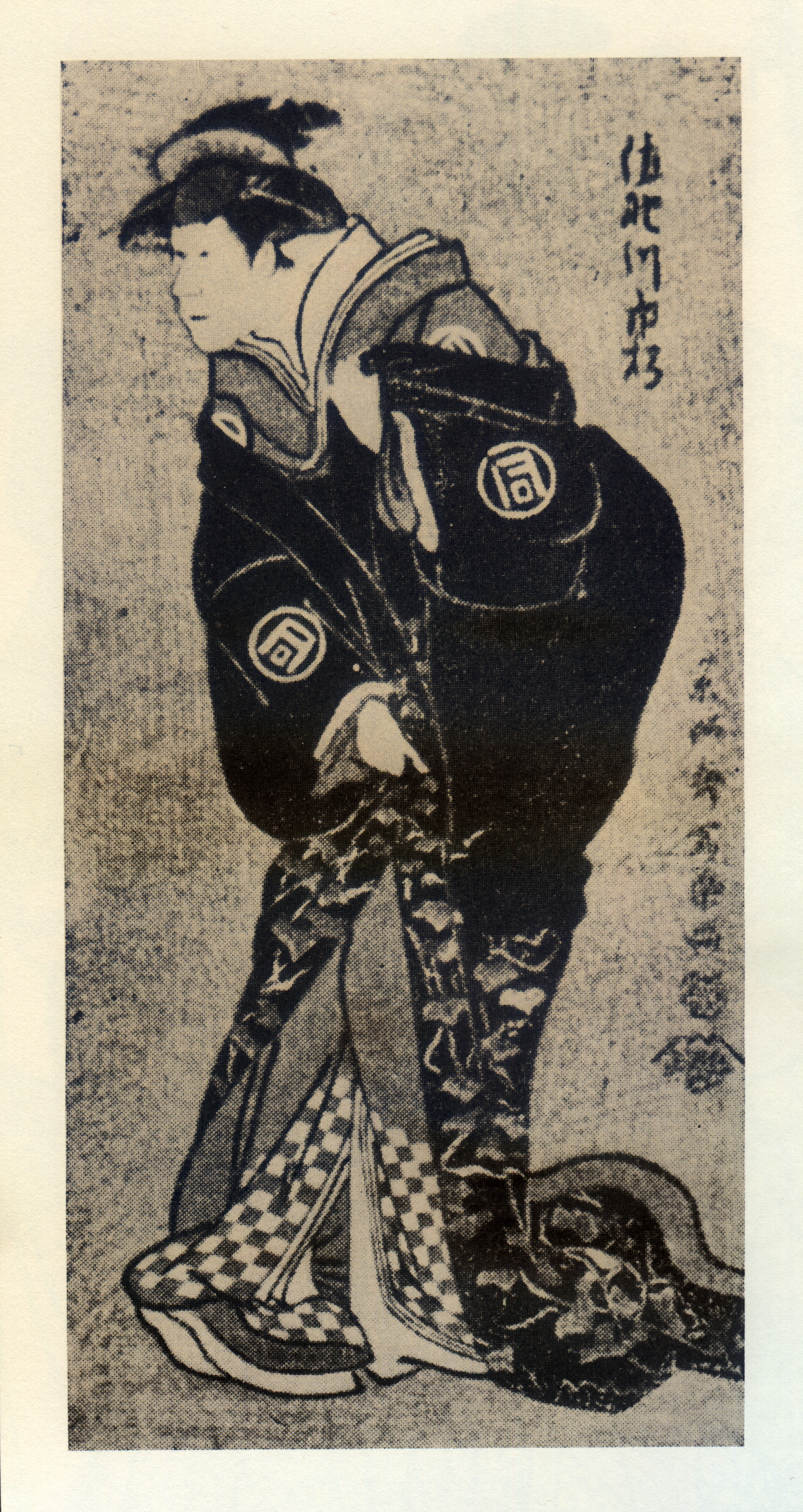

The hosoban print of Sanokawa Ichimatsu III as Sekinoto, wife of Fuwa Benzaemon (三世佐野川市松の不破伴左衛門妻関の戸 Sansei Sanokawa Ichimatsu no Fuwa Benzaemon tsuma Sekinoto) is known only through a black-and-white reproduction in Fritz Rumpf's Sharaku (1932). It is not known where the copy reproduced is.

==== Ichikawa Danjūrō VI as Fuwa no Bansaku ====
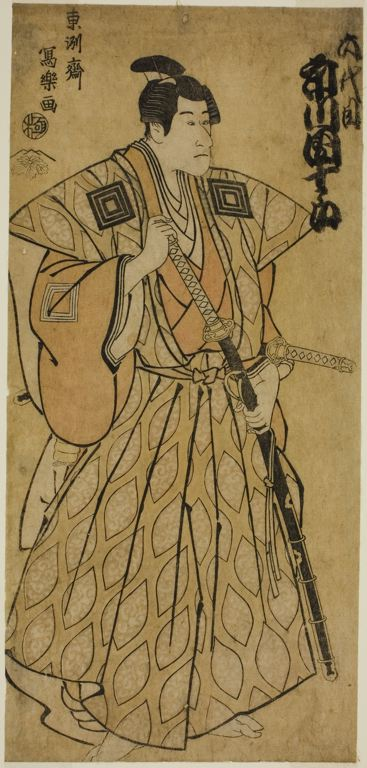

Four copies are known of the hosoban print of Ichikawa Danjūrō VI as Fuwa no Bansaku (六世市川団十郎の不破の伴作 Rokusei Ichikawa Danjūrō no Fuwa no Bansaku), one each in the collections of the Achenbach Foundation for Graphic Arts at the Fine Arts Museums of San Francisco, the Art Institute of Chicago, the Honolulu Museum of Art, and the Metropolitan Museum of Art.

==== Arashi Ryūzō II as the servant Ukiyo Matabei ====
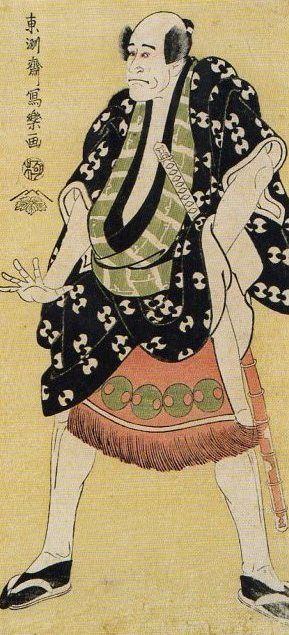

Three copies are known of the hosoban print of Arashi Ryūzō II as the servant (yakko) Ukiyo Matabei (二世嵐龍蔵の奴浮世又平 Nisei Arashi Ryūzō no yakko Ukiyo Matabei), one each in the collections of the Tokyo National Museum, Jōsai University, and the Art Institute of Chicago.

==== Arashi Ryūzō II as the manservant Ukiyo Matabei, and Ōtani Hiroji III as the manservant Tosa no Matabei ====
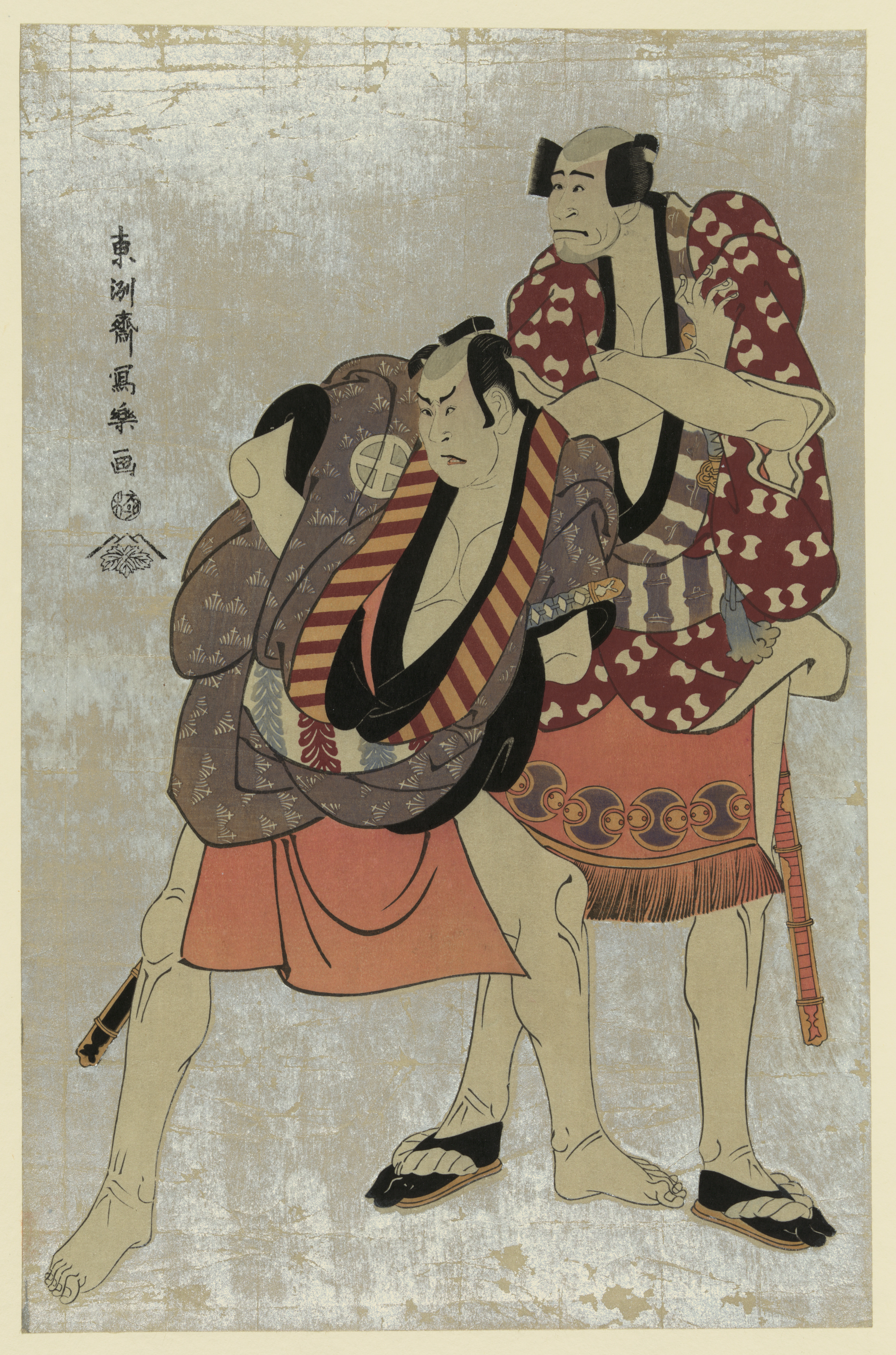

Four copies are known of the ōban print of Arashi Ryūzō II as the manservant Ukiyo Matabei, and Ōtani Hiroji III as the manservant Tosa no Matabei (二世嵐龍蔵の奴浮世又平と三世大谷広次の奴土佐の又平 Nisei Arashi Ryūzō no yakko Ukiyo Matabei to Sansei Ōtani Hiroji no yakko Tosa no Matabei), one each in the collections of Tokyo National Museum, the Japan Ukiyo-e Museum, and the Hiraki Ukiyo-e Foundation, and another in a private collection.

==== Ōtani Hiroji III as the servant Tosa no Matabei ====
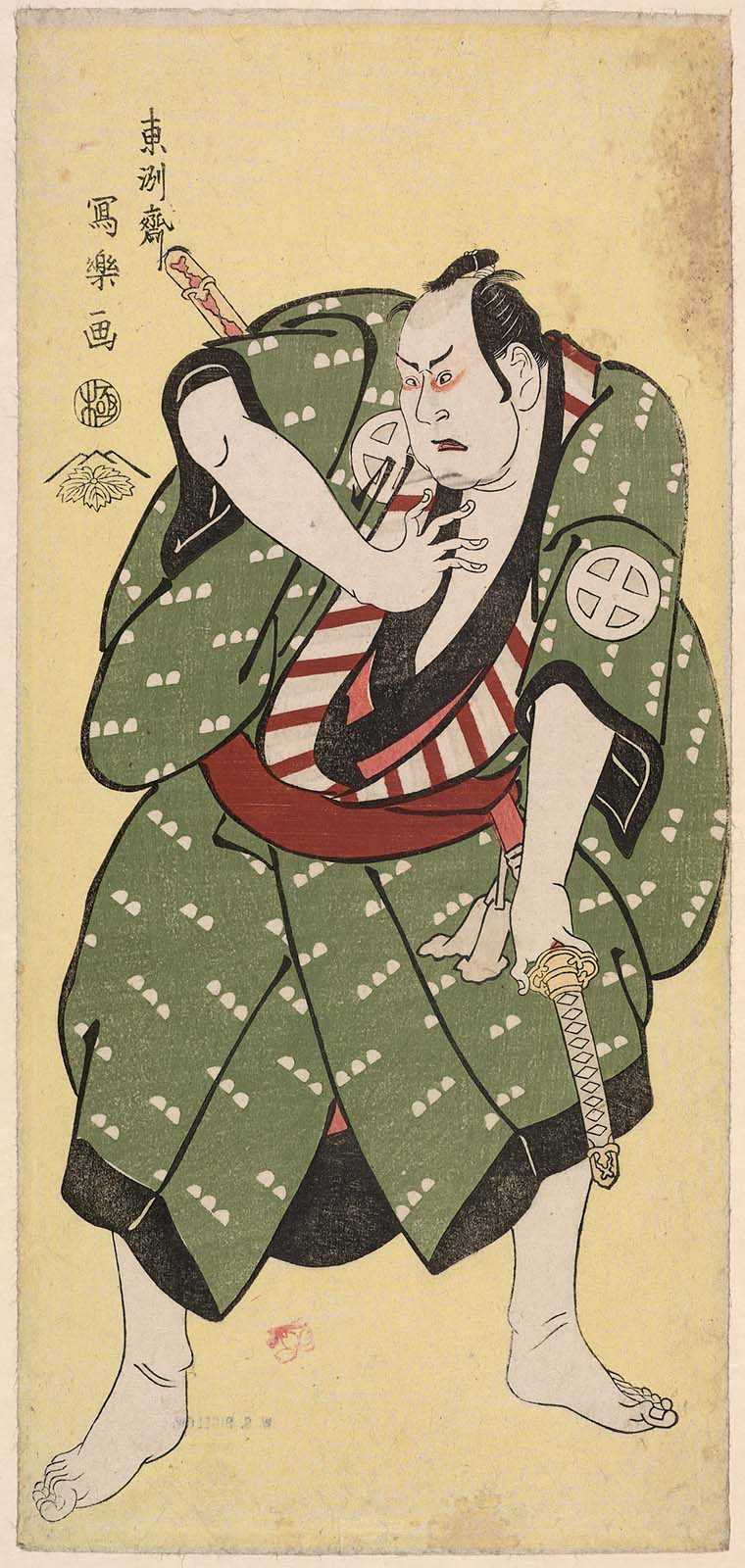

Two copies are known of the hosoban print of Ōtani Hiroji III as the servant (yakko) Tosa no Matabei (三世大谷広次の名護屋が下部土佐の又平 Sansei Ōtani Hiroji no Nagoya ga kabu Tosa no Matabei); one each are in the collections of the Tokyo National Museum and the Museum of Fine Arts, Boston.

==== Bandō Mitsugorō II as the farmer Fukakusa no Jirōsaku ====
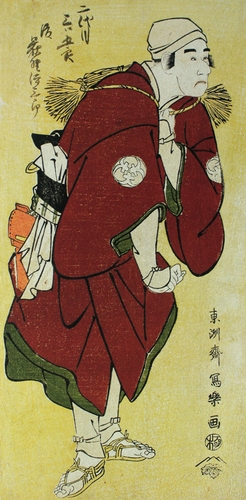

Four copies of the hosoban print of Bandō Mitsugorō II as the farmer Fukakusa no Jirōsaku (二世坂東三津五郎の百姓深草の次郎作 Nisei Bandō Mitsugorō no hyakushō Fukakusa no Jirōsaku), one each in the collections of the Tokyo National Museum, the Museum of Fine Arts, Boston, and the Metropolitan Museum of Art, and another in a private collection.

==== Ichikawa Tomiemon I as Inokuma Monbei ====
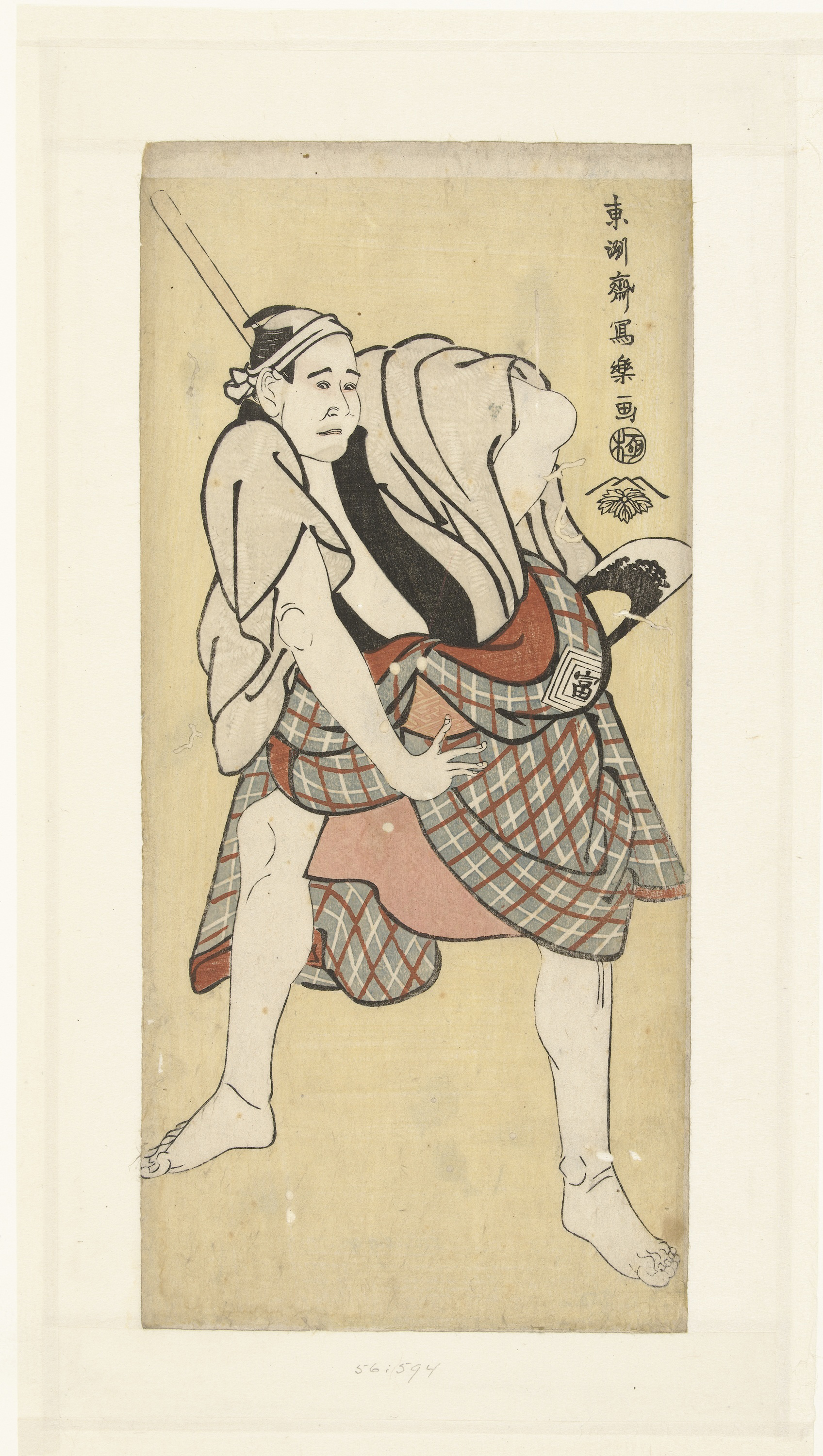

Seven copies are known of the hosoban print of Ichikawa Tomiemon I as Inokuma Monbei (初世市川富右衛門の猪の熊門兵衛 Shosei Ichikawa Tomiemon as Inokuma Monbei), one each in the collections of the Tokyo National Museum, the Rijksmuseum, the M. Walter Amstutz Collection, the Museum of Fine Arts, Boston, the Art Institute of Chicago, the Guimet Museum, and the Honolulu Museum of Art.

==== Ōtani Tokuji I as Monokusa Tarō ====
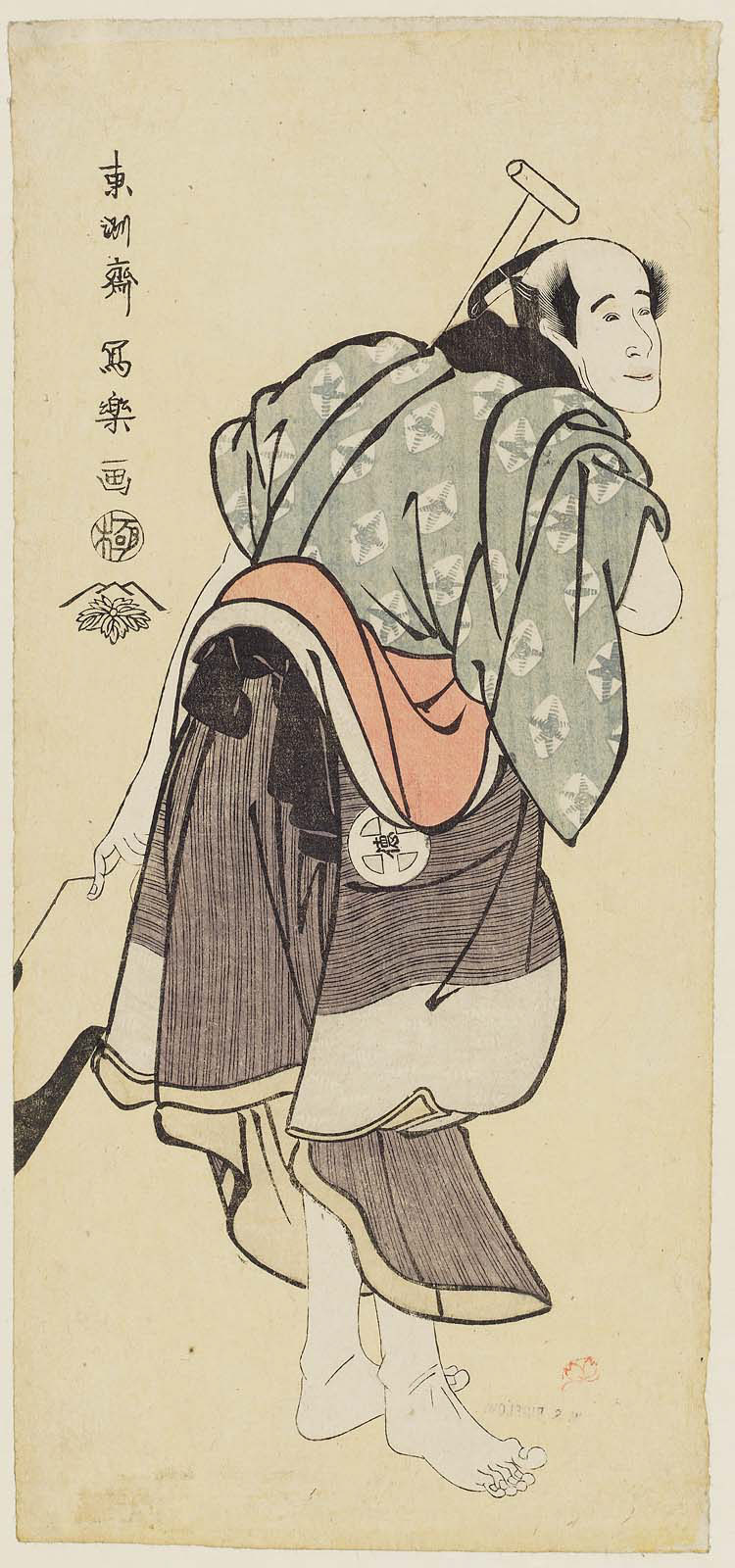

Four copies are known of the hosoban print of Ōtani Tokuji I as Monkusa Tarō (初世大谷徳次の物草太郎 Shosei Ōtani Tokuji no Monokusa Tarō, one each in the collections of the Tokyo National Museum, the Museum of Fine Arts, Boston, and the Edoardo Chiossone Museum of Oriental Art, and another in a private collection.

==== Sakata Hangorō III as Kosodate Kannonbō ====
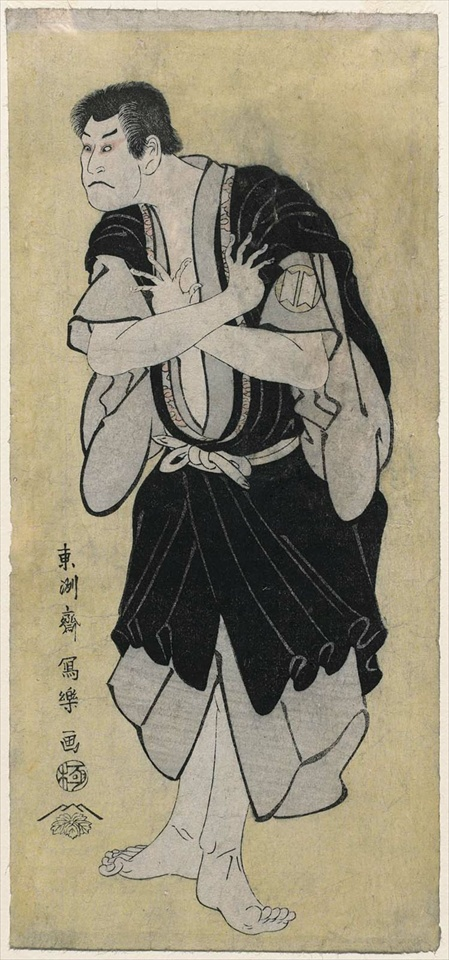

Two copies of the hosoban print of Sakata Hangorō III as Kosodate Kannonbō (三世坂田半五郎の子育て観音坊 Sansei Sakata Hangorō no Kosodate Kannonbō); one each are in the collections of the Museum of Fine Arts, Boston, and the Art Institute of Chicago.

==== Segawa Tomisaburō II as the Courtesan Tōyama, and Ichikawa Kurizō as Higashiyama Yoshiwakamaru ====
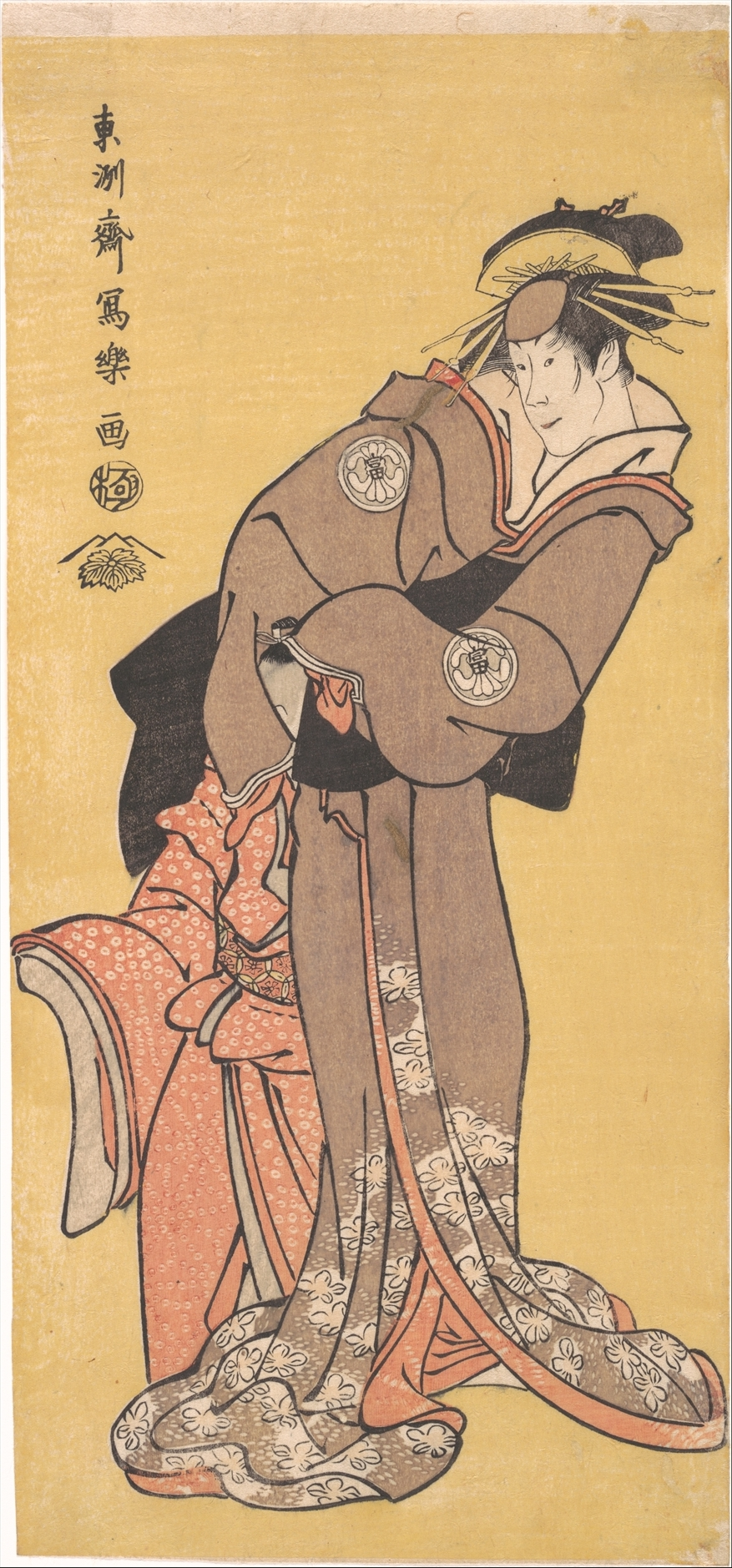

Two copies are known of the hosoban print of Segawa Tomisaburō II as the Courtesan Tōyama, and Ichikawa Kurizō as Higashiyama Yoshiwakamaru (二世瀬川富三郎の傾城遠山と市川栗蔵の東山義若丸 Nisei Segawa Tomisaburō no keisei Tōyama to Ichikawa Kurizō no Higashiyama Yoshiwakamaru; one each are in the collections of the Museum of Fine Arts, Boston, and the Metropolitan Museum of Art.

==== Ichikawa Yaozō III as Fuwa Banzaemon Shigekatsu ====
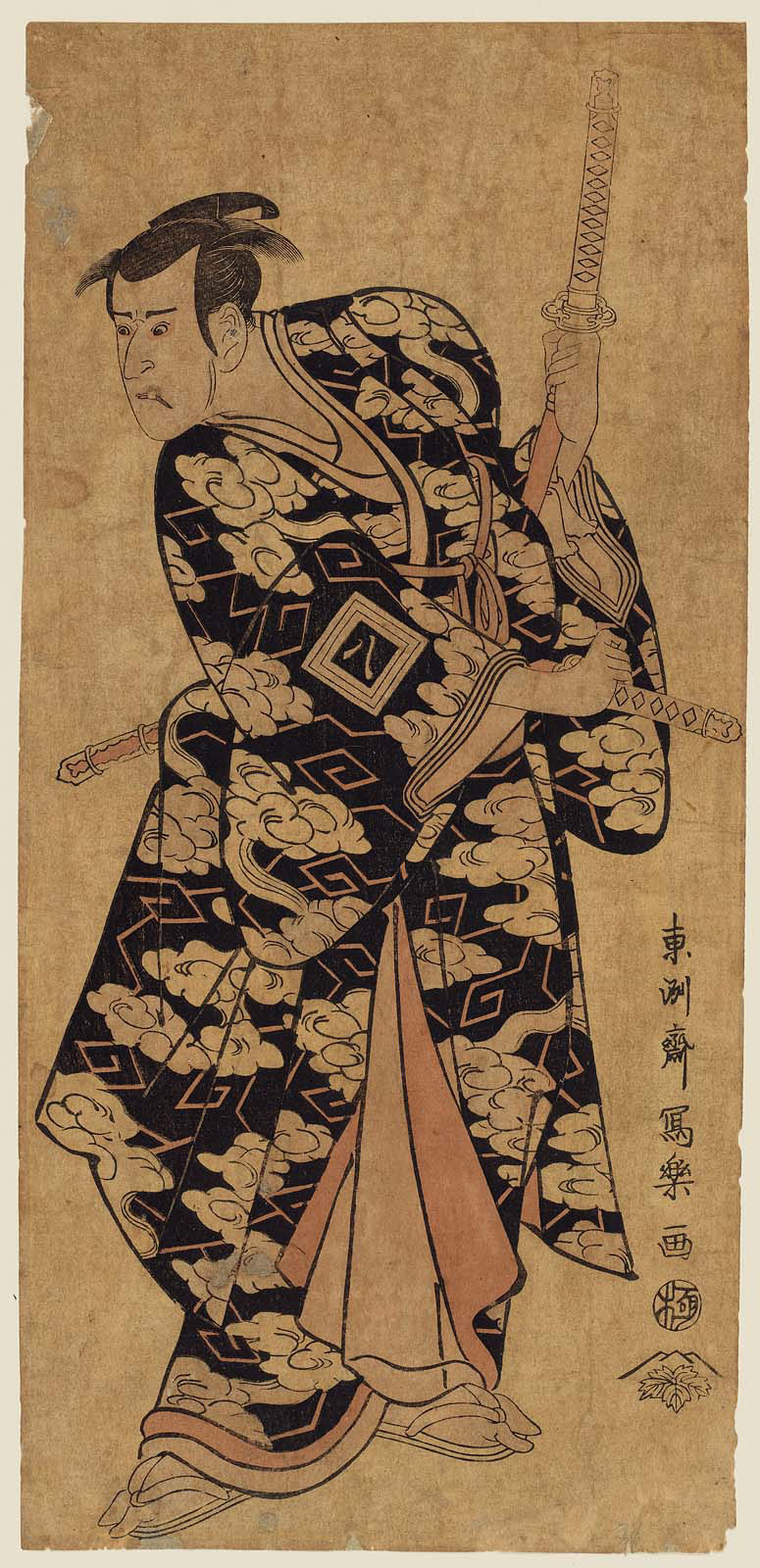

hosoban print of Ichikawa Yaozō III as Fuwa Banzaemon Shigekatsu (三世市川八百蔵の不破の伴左衛門重勝 Sansei Ichikawa Yaozō no Fuwa Banzaemon Shigekatsu)

==== Segawa Kikunojō III as the courtesan Katsuragi ====
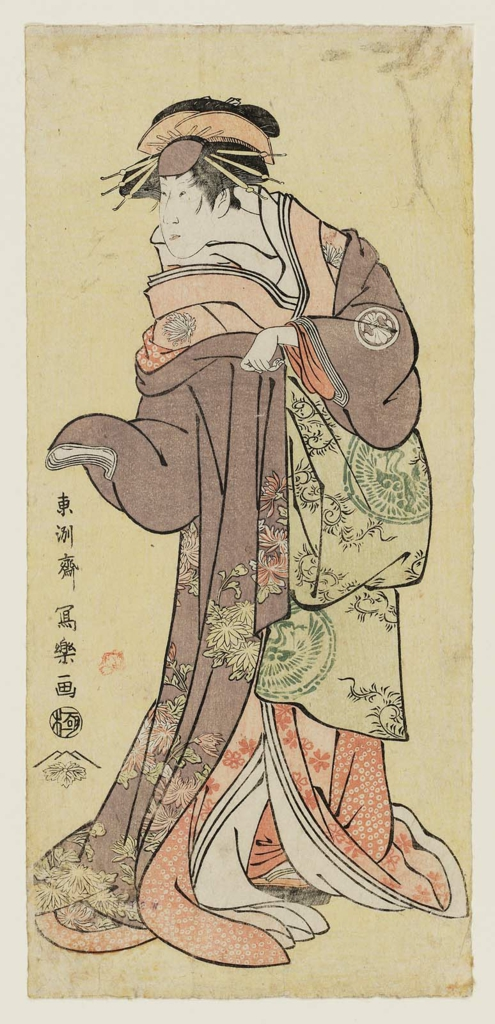

Segawa Kikunojō III (1751–1810) as the courtesan Katsuragi (三世瀬川菊之丞の傾城かつらぎ Sansei Segawa Kikunojō no keisei Katsuragi

==== Sawamura Sōjūrō III as Nagoya Sanza ====
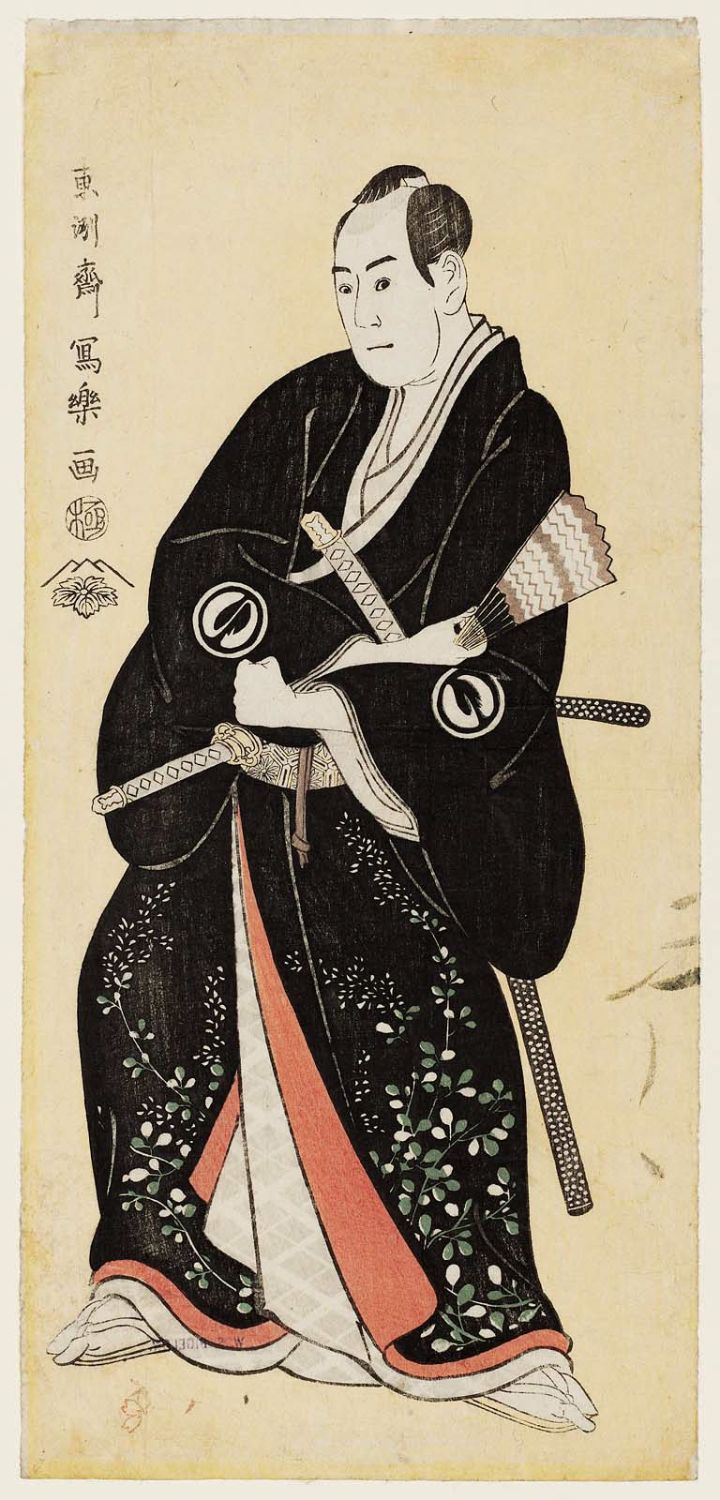

hosoban print of Sawamura Sōjūrō III as Nagoya Sanza (沢村宗十郎の名護屋山三 Sawamura Sōjūrō no Nagoya Sanza)

==== Sawamura Sōjūrō III as Nagoya Sanza, and Segawa Kikunojō III as the courtesan Katsuragi ====
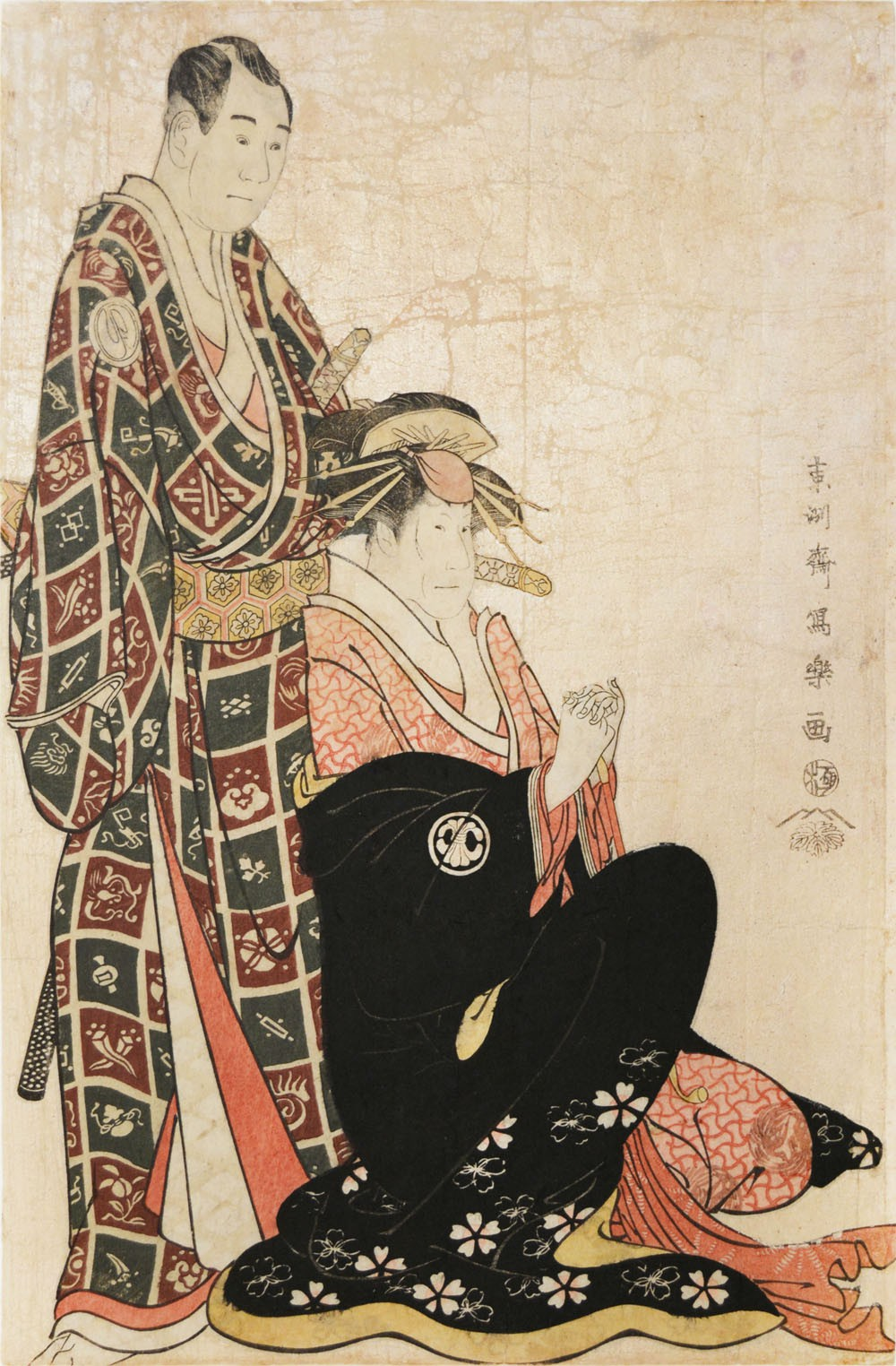

ōban print of Sawamura Sōjūrō III as Nagoya Sanza, and Segawa Kikunojō III as the courtesan Katsuragi (三世沢村宗十郎の名護屋山三と三世瀬川菊之丞の傾城かつらぎ Sansei Sawamura Sōjūrō no Nagoya Sanza to Sansei Segawa Kikunojō no keisei Katsuragi)

==== Ichikawa Yaozō III as Fuwa Banzaemon, and Sakata Hangorō III as Kosodate Kannonbō ====
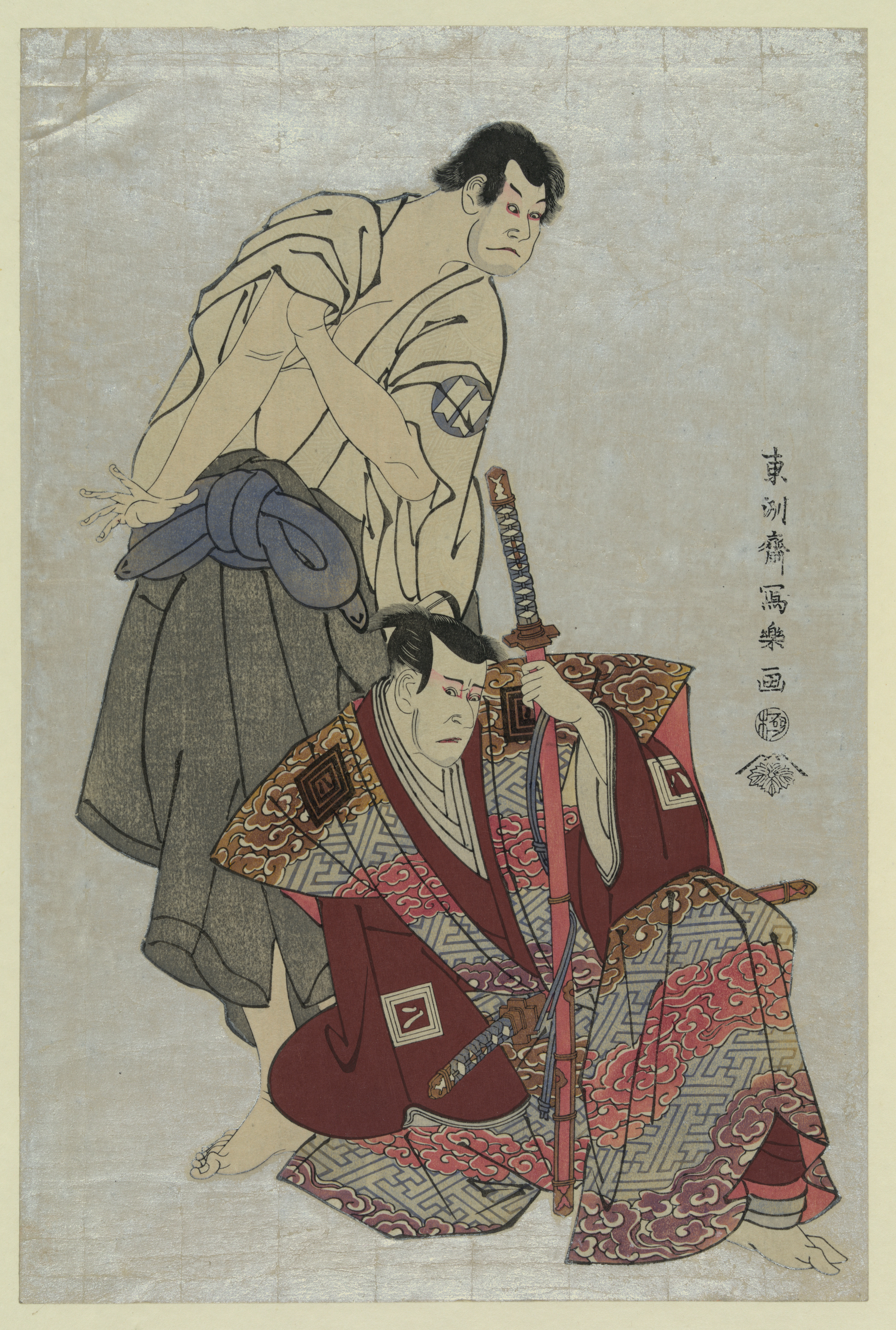

ōban print of Ichikawa Yaozō III as Fuwa Banzaemon, and Sakata Hangorō III as Kosodate Kannonbō (三世市川八百蔵の不破伴左衛門と三世坂田半五郎の子育観音坊 Sansei Ichikawa Yaozō no Fuwa Banzaemon to Sansei Sakata Hangorō no Kosodate Kannonbō)

=== Shinrei Yaguchi no Watashi ===
==== Nakayama Tomisaburō I as Tsukuba Gozen, wife of Yoshioki ====
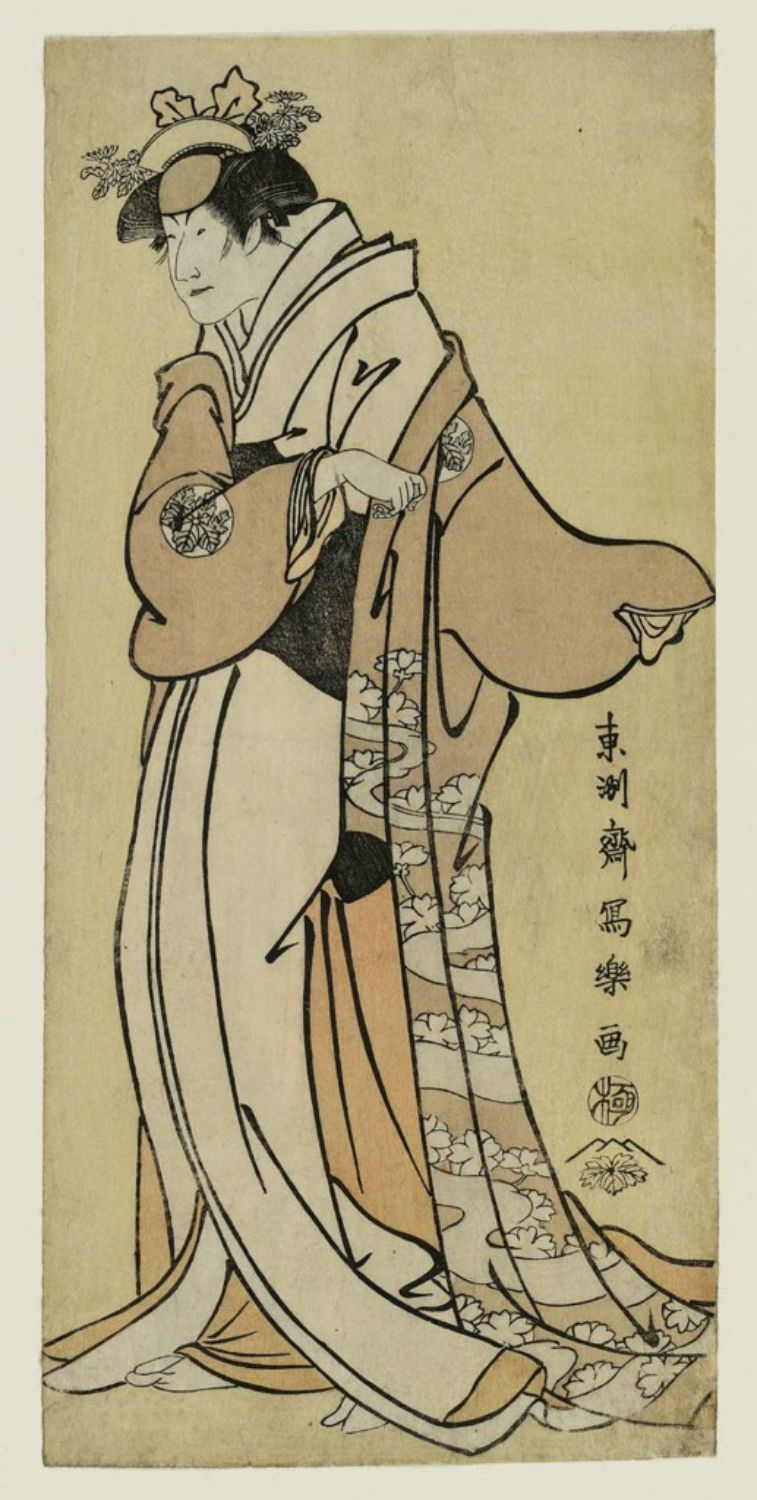

Four copies are known of the hosoban print of Nakayama Tomisaburō I as Yoshioki's wife Tsukuba Gozen (初世中山富三郎の義興御台つくば御前 Shosei Nakayama Tomisaburō no Yoshioki midai Tsukuba Gozen); one each are in the collections of the Hagi Uragami Museum, Museum of Fine Arts, Boston, and the Art Institute of Chicago, and another is in a private collection.

==== Nakamura Kumetarō II as Minato, wife of Yura Hyōgonosuke ====
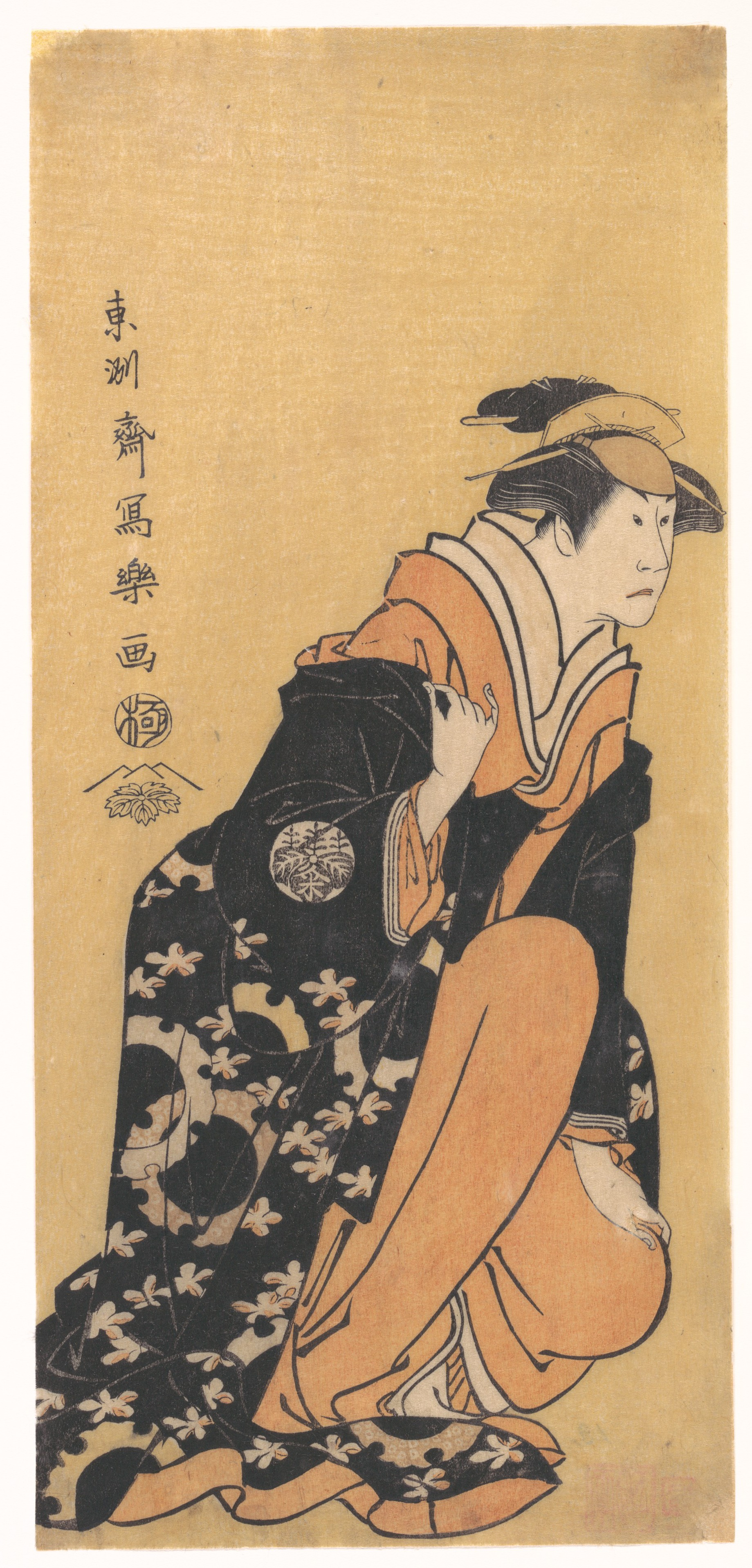

Three copies are known of the hosoban print of Nakamura Kumetarō II as Yura Hyōgonosuke's wife Minato (二世中村粢太郎の由良兵庫之助妻みなと Nisei Nakamura Kumetarō no Yura Hyōgonosuke tsuma Minato); one is in the collection of the Museum of Fine Arts, Boston, and two in that of the Metropolitan Museum of Art.

==== Ichikawa Komazō III as Minase Rokurō Munezumi in a kamishimo ====
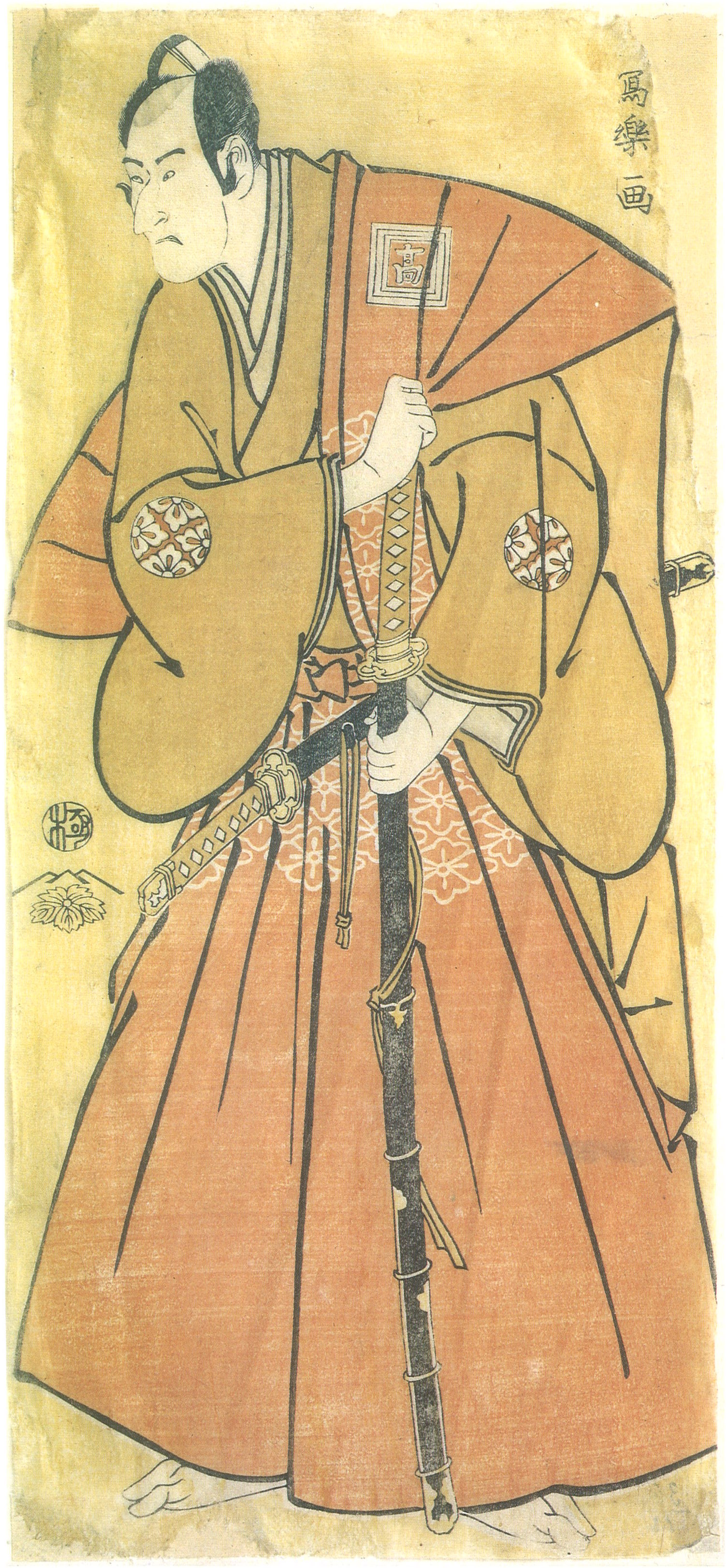

One copy is known of the hosoban print of Ichikawa Komazō III as Minase Rokurō Munezumi in a kamishimo (三世市川高麗蔵の南瀬六郎宗純(裃姿) Sansei Ichikawa Komazō as Minase Rokurō Munezumi (kamishimo sugata)); it is in the collection of the Guimet Museum.

==== Ichikawa Komazō III as Minase Rokurō Munezumi as a pilgrim ====
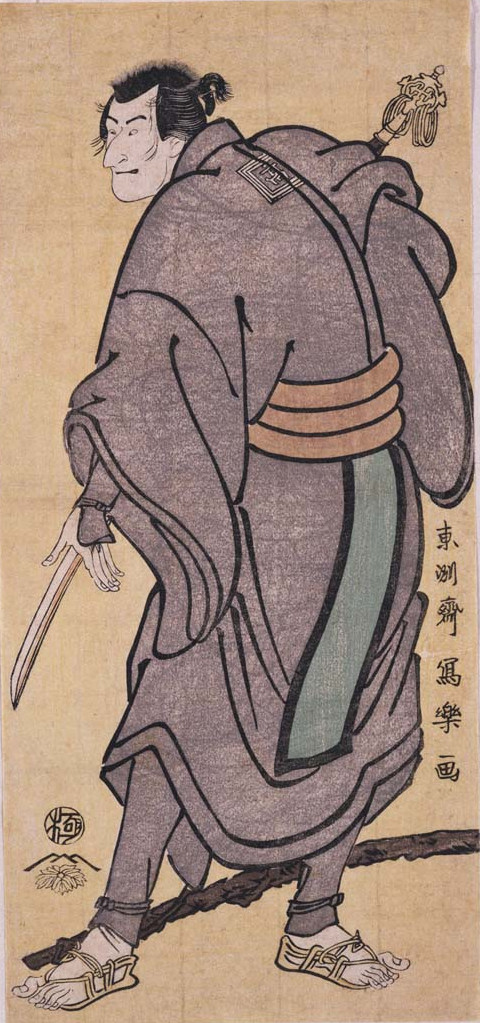

Two copies are known of the hosoban print of Ichikawa Komazō III as Minase Rokurō Munezumi as a pilgrim (三世市川高麗蔵の南瀬六郎宗澄（六部姿） Sansei Ichikawa Komazō as Minase Rokurō Munezumi (kamishimo sugata)); one each are in the collections of the Tokyo National Museum and the Museum of Fine Arts, Boston.

==== Nakajima Kanzō II as Negoto no Chōzō the packhorse driver ====
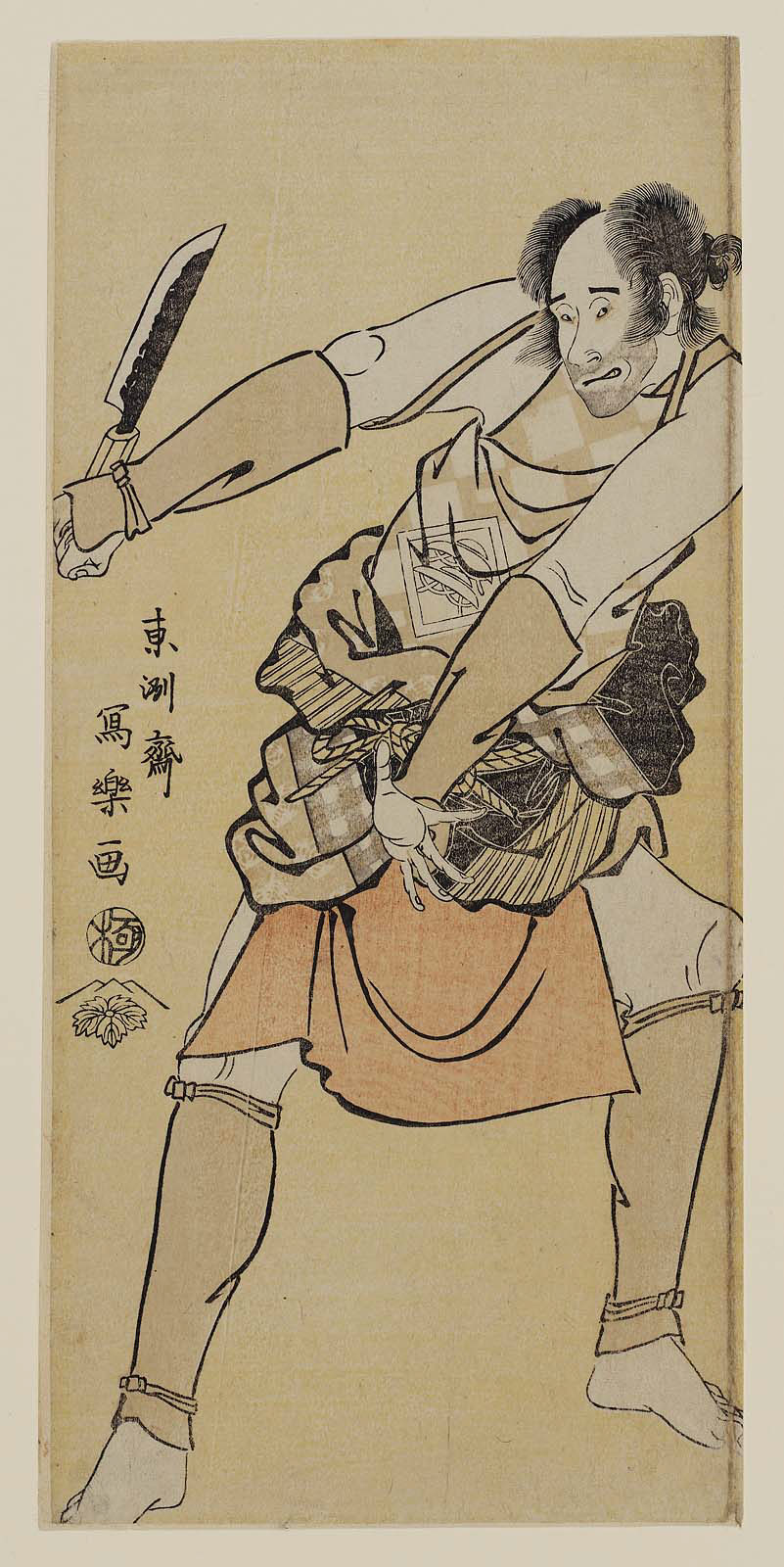

Three copies are known of the hosoban print of Nakajima Kanzō II as Negoto no Chōzō the packhorse driver (中島勘蔵の馬士ねぼけの長蔵 Nisei Nakajima Kanzō no bashi neboke no Chōzō); one is in the collections of the Tokyo National Museum and the others are in that of the Museum of Fine Arts, Boston.

==== Morita Kan'ya VIII as Yura Hyōgonosuke ====
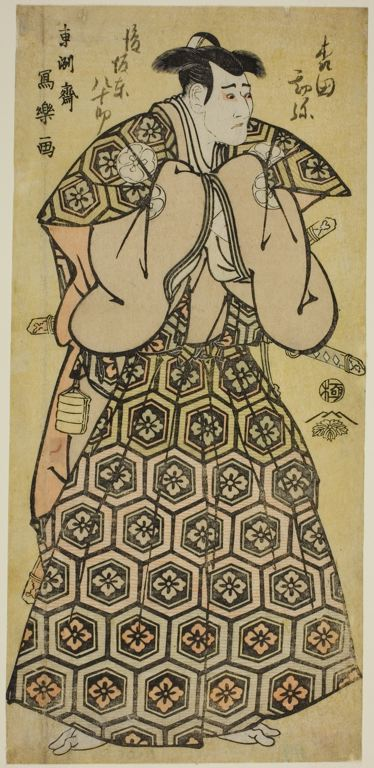

Five copies are known of the hosoban print of Morita Kan'ya VIII as Yura Hyōgonosuke (八世森田勘弥の由良兵庫之助 Hassei Morita Kan'ya no Yura Hyōgonosuke); one each are in the collections of Jōsai University and the Art Institute of Chicago, and the others are in private collections.

=== Yomo no Nishiki Kokyō no Tabi-ji ===
Yomo no Nishiki Kokyō no Tabi-ji (四方錦故郷旅路) débuted at the Kiri-za theatre in the 8th month of 6th year of Kansei.

==== Matsumoto Yonesaburō I as the maid Otsuyu ====
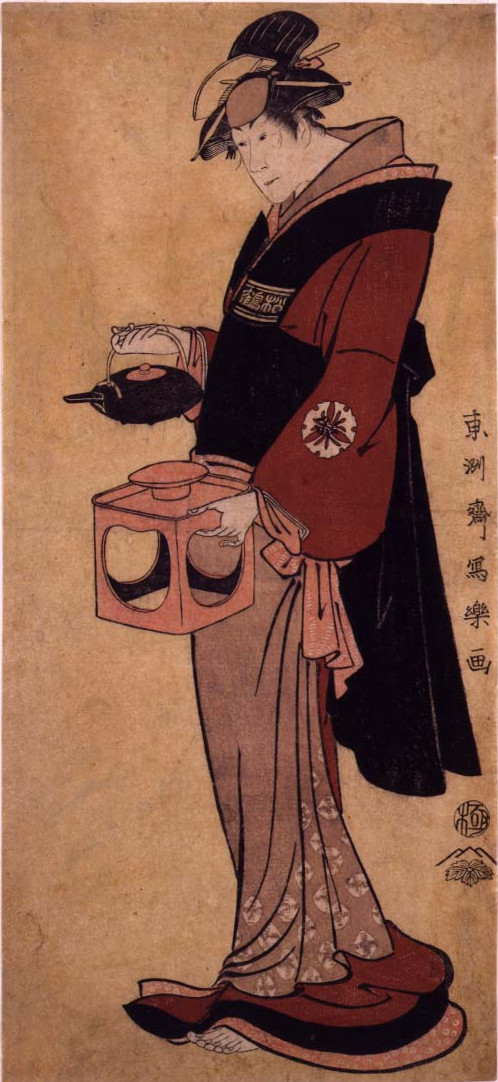

Two copies are known of hosoban print of Matsumoto Yonesaburō I as the maid Otsuyu (初世松本米三郎の仲居おつゆ Shosei Matsumoto Yonesaburō no nakai Otsuyu), one each in the collections of the Tokyo National Museum and the Museum of Asian Art.

==== Nakajima Wadaemon I as Tanbaya Hachiemon ====
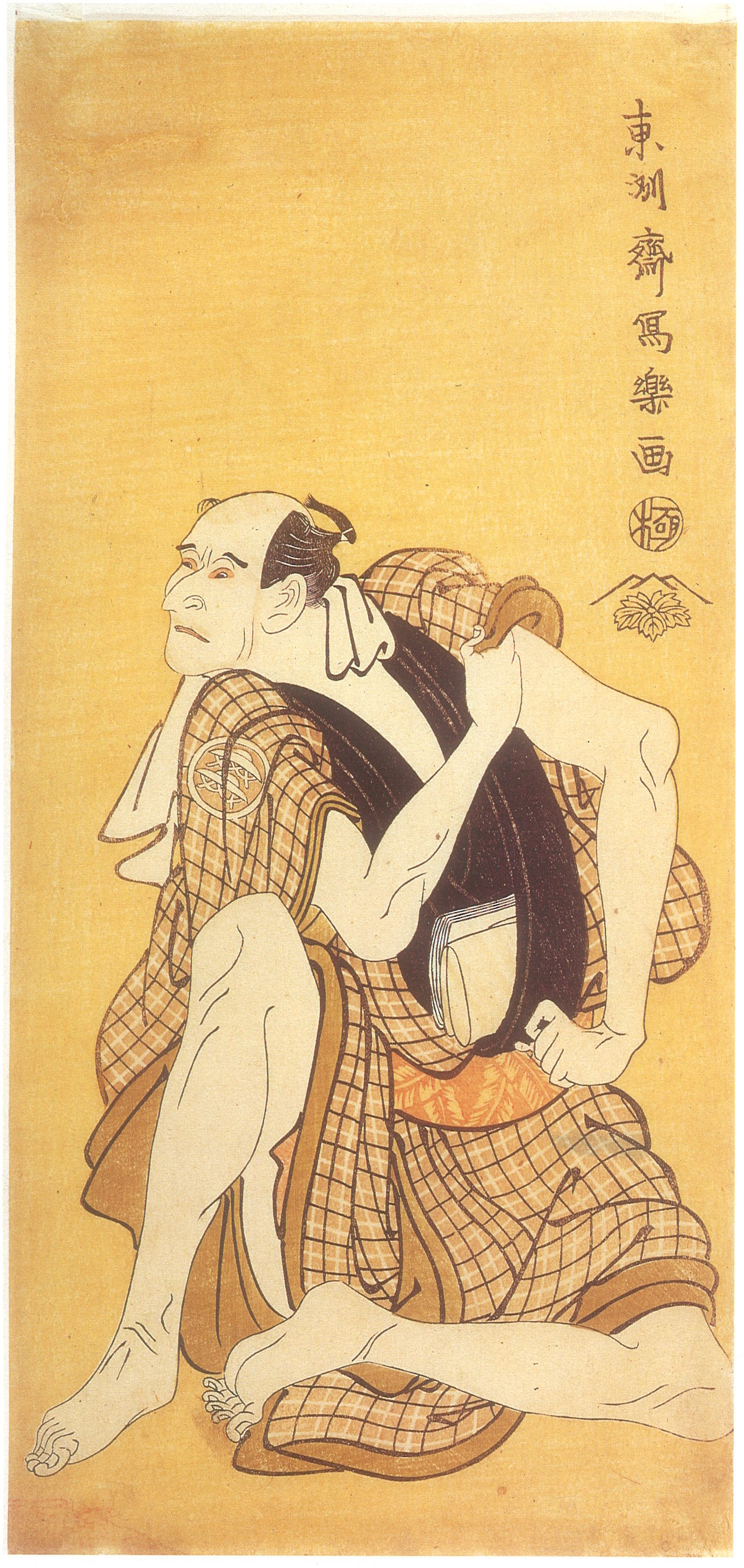

One copy is known of the hosoban print of Nakajima Wadaemon I as Tanbaya Hachiemon (初世中島和田右衛門の丹波屋八右衛門 Shosei Nakajima Wadaemon no Tanbaya Hachiemon); it is in a private collection.

==== Matsumoto Kōshirō IV as the hick spendthrift from Yamato, actually Ninokuchimura Magoemon ====
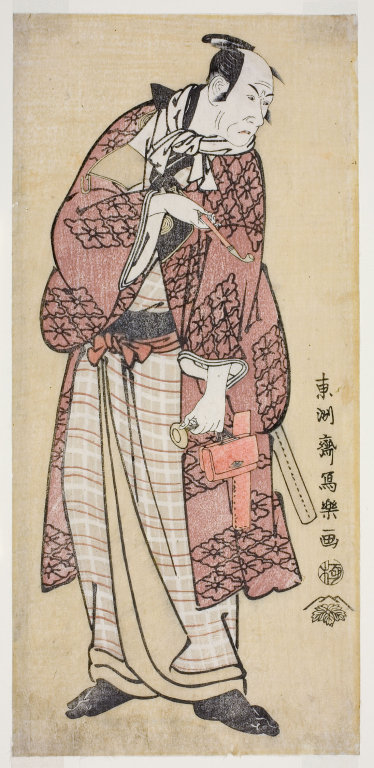

One copy is known of the hosoban print of Matsumoto Kōshirō IV as the hick spendthrift from Yamato, actually Ninokuchimura Magoemon (四世松本幸四郎の大和のやぼ大尽実は新口村の孫右衛門 Yonsei Matsumoto Kōshirō no Yamato no yabo daijin jitsu wa Ninokuchimura Magoemon); it is in the collection of the Art Institute of Chicago.

==== Ichikawa Komazō III as Kameya Chūbei, and Nakayama Tomisaburō as Umegawa ====
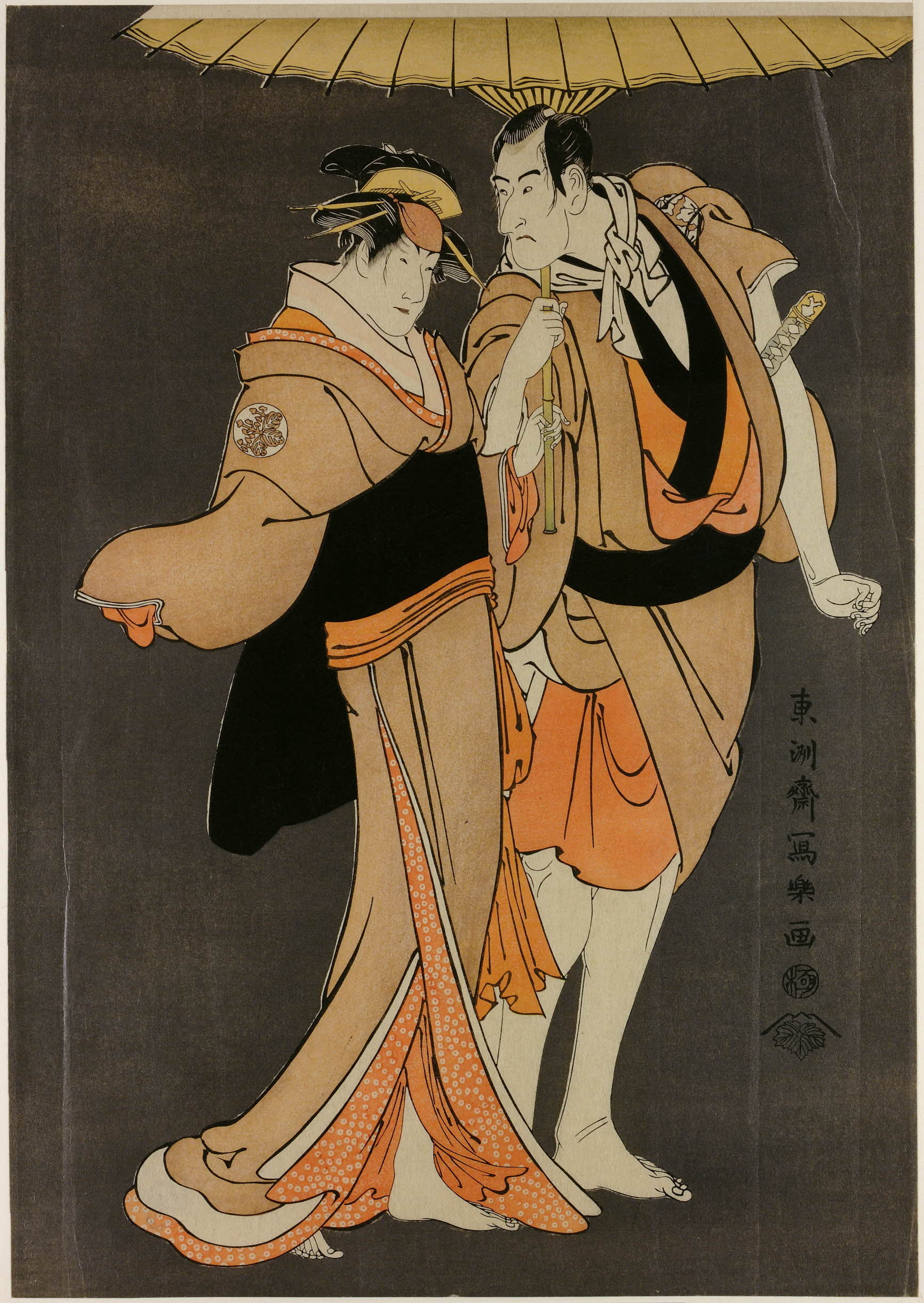

Six copies are known of the ōban print of Ichikawa Komazō III as Kameya Chūbei, and Nakayama Tomisaburō as Umegawa (二世市川高麗蔵の亀屋忠兵衛と初世中山富三郎の梅川 Shosei Ichikawa Komazō no Kameya Chūbei to Shosei Nakayama Tomisaburō no Umegawa), one each in the collections of the Tokyo National Museum, the Hiraki Ukiyo-e Foundation, the British Museum, and the Bibliothèque nationale de France, and two in that of the Museum of Fine Arts, Boston.

==== Matsumoto Kōshirō IV as Ninokuchimura Magoemon, and Nakayama Tomisaburō as Umegawa ====
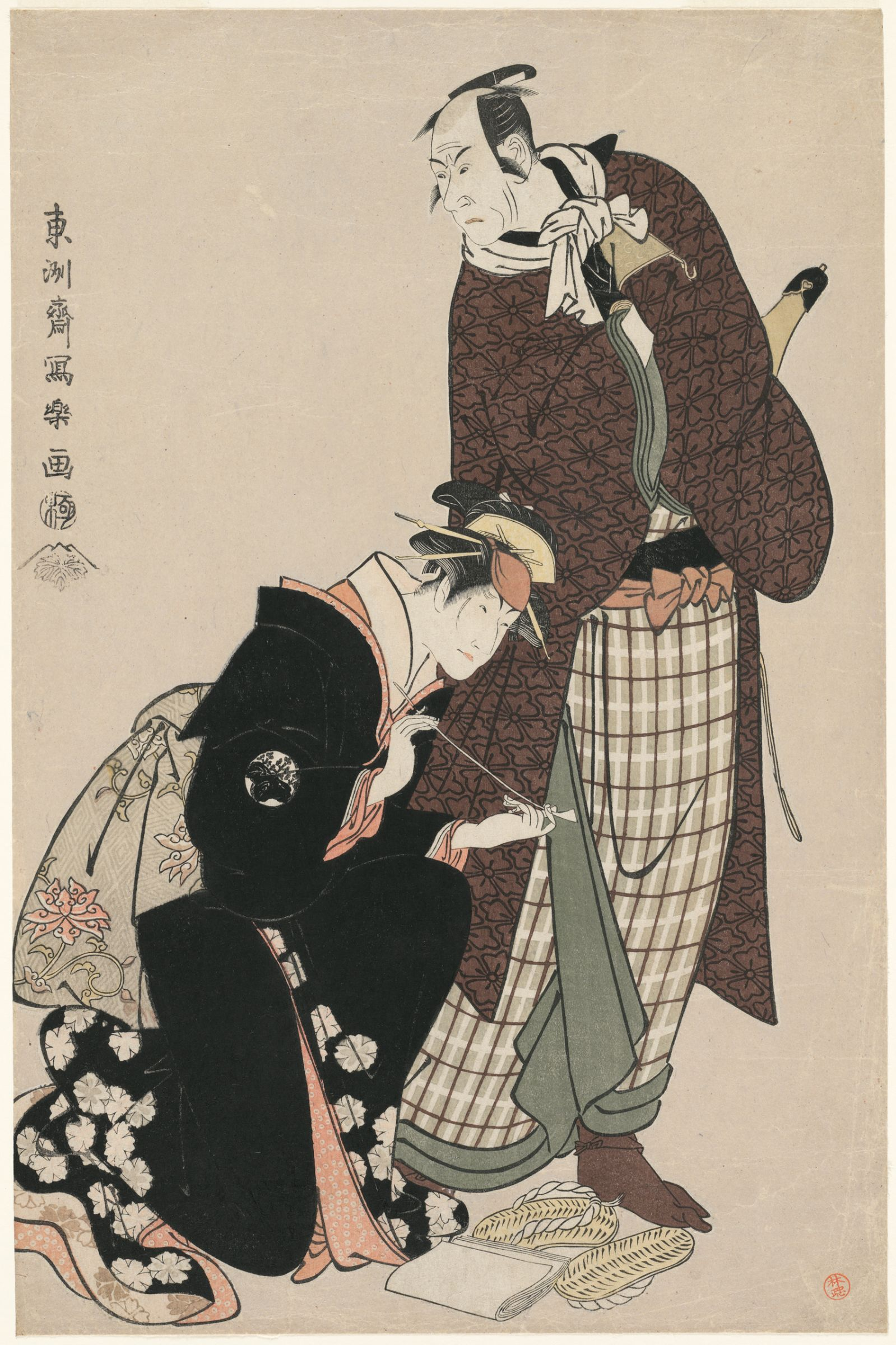

Six copies are known of the ōban print of Matsumoto Kōshirō IV as Ninokuchimura Magoemon, and Nakayama Tomisaburō as Umegawa (四世松本幸四郎の新口村孫右衛門と中山富三郎の梅川 Yonsei Matsumoto Kōshirō Ninokuchimura Magoemon to Nakayama Tomisaburō no Umegawa), one each in the collections of the Tokyo National Museum, the Baur Foundation, the Royal Museums of Art and History, and the Harvard Art Museums, and two in that of the Museum of Fine Arts, Boston.

=== Nihon-matsu Michinoku Sodachi ===
==== Ōtani Oniji II as Kawashima Jibugorō ====
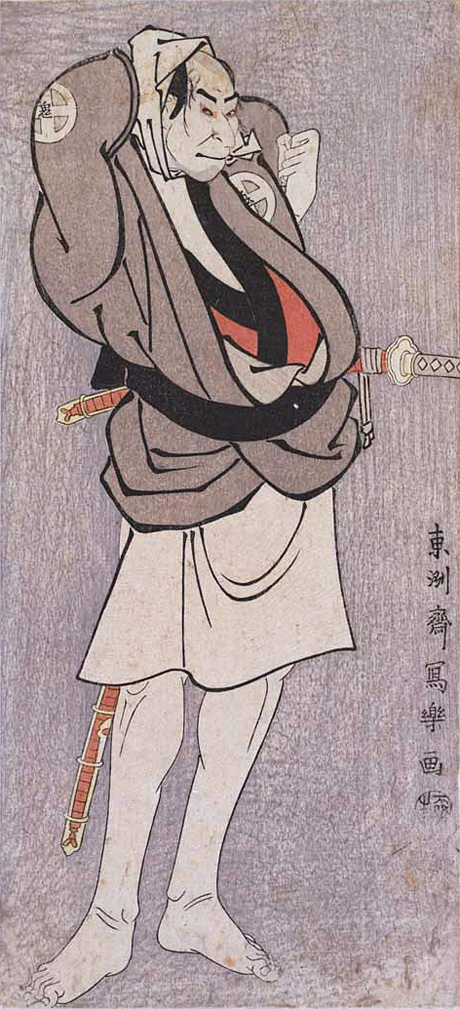

Two copies are known of the hosoban print of Ōtani Oniji II as Kawashima Jibugorō (二世大谷鬼次の川島治部五郎 Nisei Ōtani Oniji no Kawashima Jibugorō), one in the collection of the Tokyo National Museum and the other in a private collection.

==== Ichikawa Omezō I as Tomita Hyōtarō ====
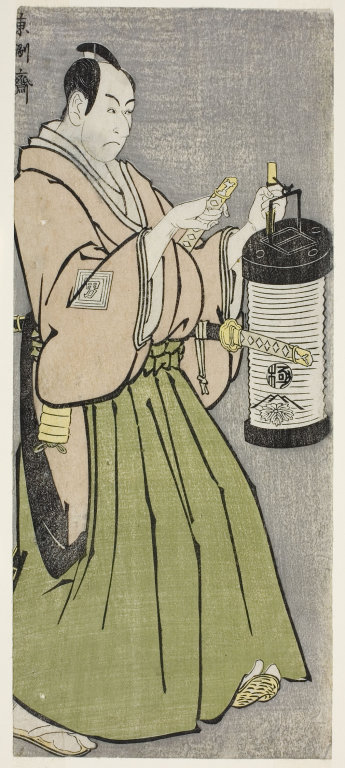

One copy is known of the hosoban print of Ichikawa Omezō I as Tomita Hyōtarō (市川男女蔵の富田兵太郎 Shosei Ichikawa Omezō no Tomita Hyōtarō); it is in the collection of the Art Institute of Chicago.

==== Ichikawa Omezō I as Tomita Hyōtarō and Ōtani Oniji III as Kawashima Jibugorō ====
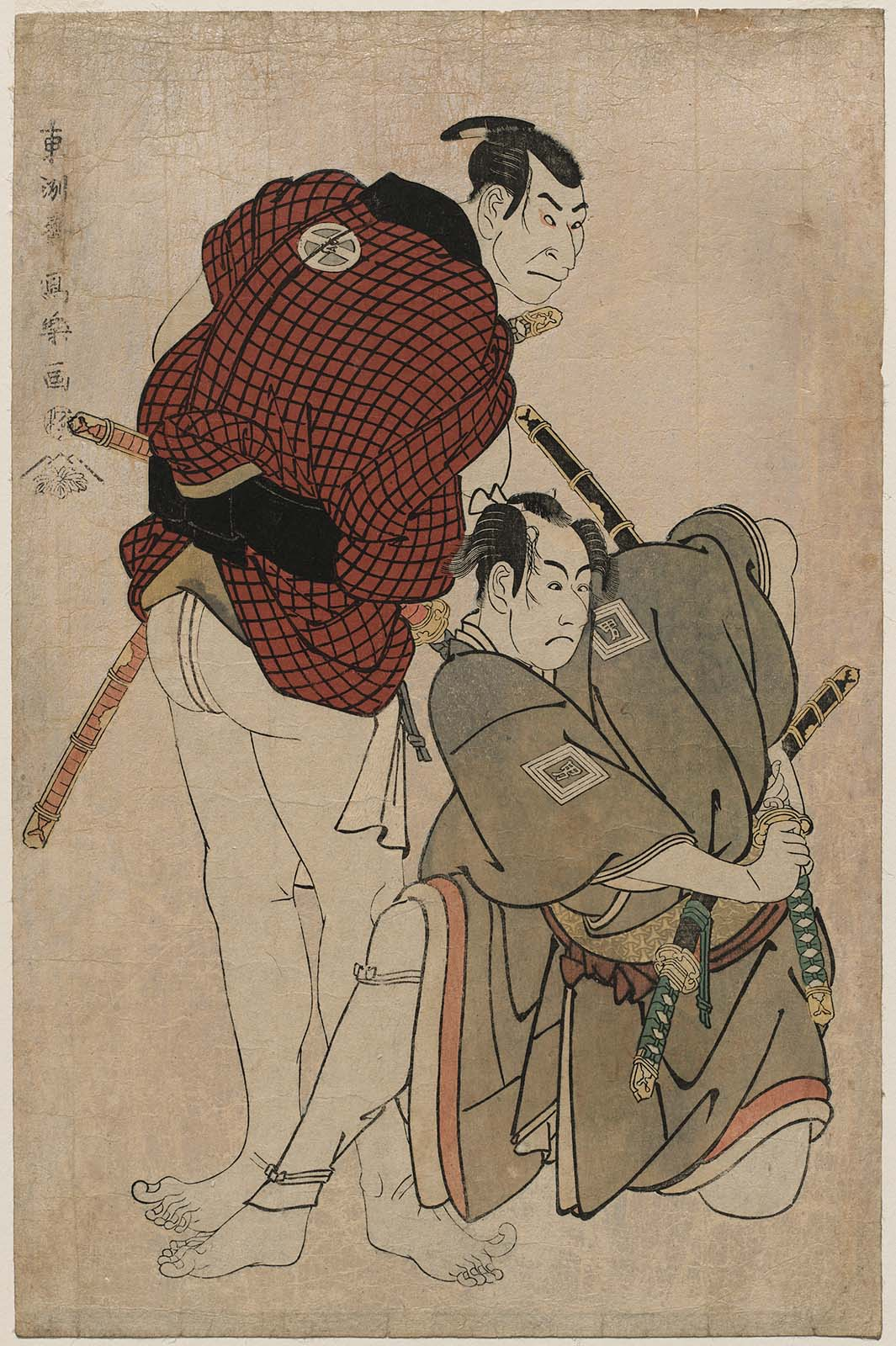

Eight copies are known of the ōban print of Ichikawa Omezō I as Tomita Hyōtarō and Ōtani Oniji III as Kawashima Jibugorō (初世市川高麗蔵の富田兵太郎と三世大谷鬼次の川島治部五郎 Shosei Ichikawa Omezō no Tomita Hyōtarō to Sansei Ōtani Oniji no Kawashima Jibugorō), one each in the collections of the Tokyo National Museum, the British Museum, the Museum of Fine Arts, Boston, the Royal Museums of Art and History, the Art Institute of Chicago, the Guimet Museum, the Honolulu Museum of Art, and the Metropolitan Museum of Art. The print was earlier thought to be of Ichikawa Omezō I as Sekitori Ikazuchi Tsurunosuke and Ōtani Oniji III as Ukiyo Tsuchihei (初世市川高麗蔵の関取雷鶴之助と三世大谷鬼次の浮世土平 Shosei Ichikawa Omezō no Sekitori Ikazuchi Tsurunosuke to Sansei Ōtani Oniji no Kawashima Jibugorō).

=== Nihon-matsu Michinoku Sodachi Niban-me ===
Nihon-matsu Michinoku Sodachi Niban-me (日本松陸奥生長二番目)

==== Bandō Hikosaburō III as Obiya Chōemon ====
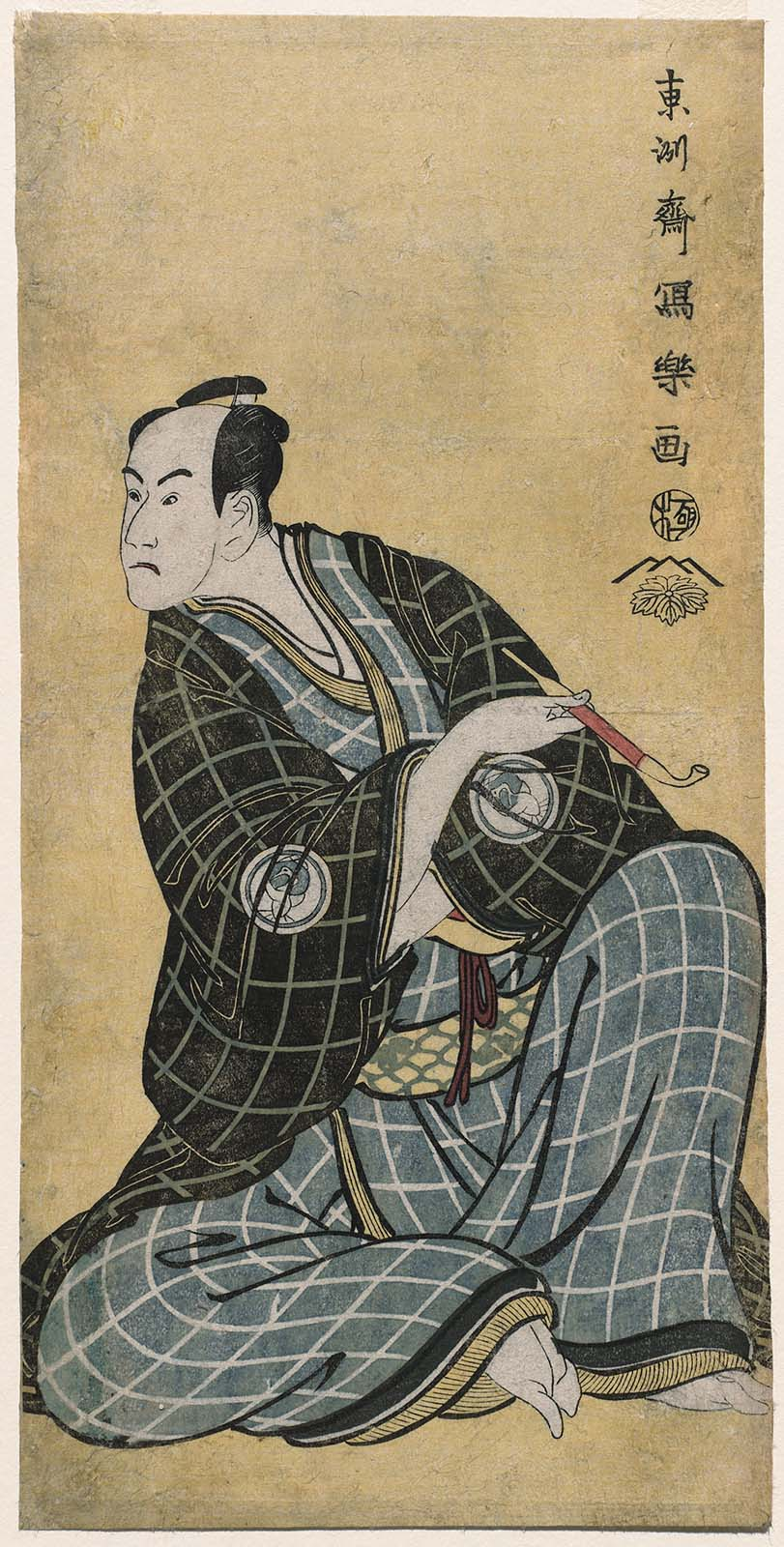

Two copies are known of the hosoban print of Bandō Hikosaburō III as Obiya Chōemon (三世坂東彦三郎の帯屋長右衛門 Sansei Bandō Hikosaburō no Obiya Chōemon); one is in the collection of the Museum of Fine Arts, Boston, and the other in the Grabhorn Collection at the Asian Art Museum of San Francisco.

==== Iwai Hanshirō IV as O-Han of the Shinanoya ====
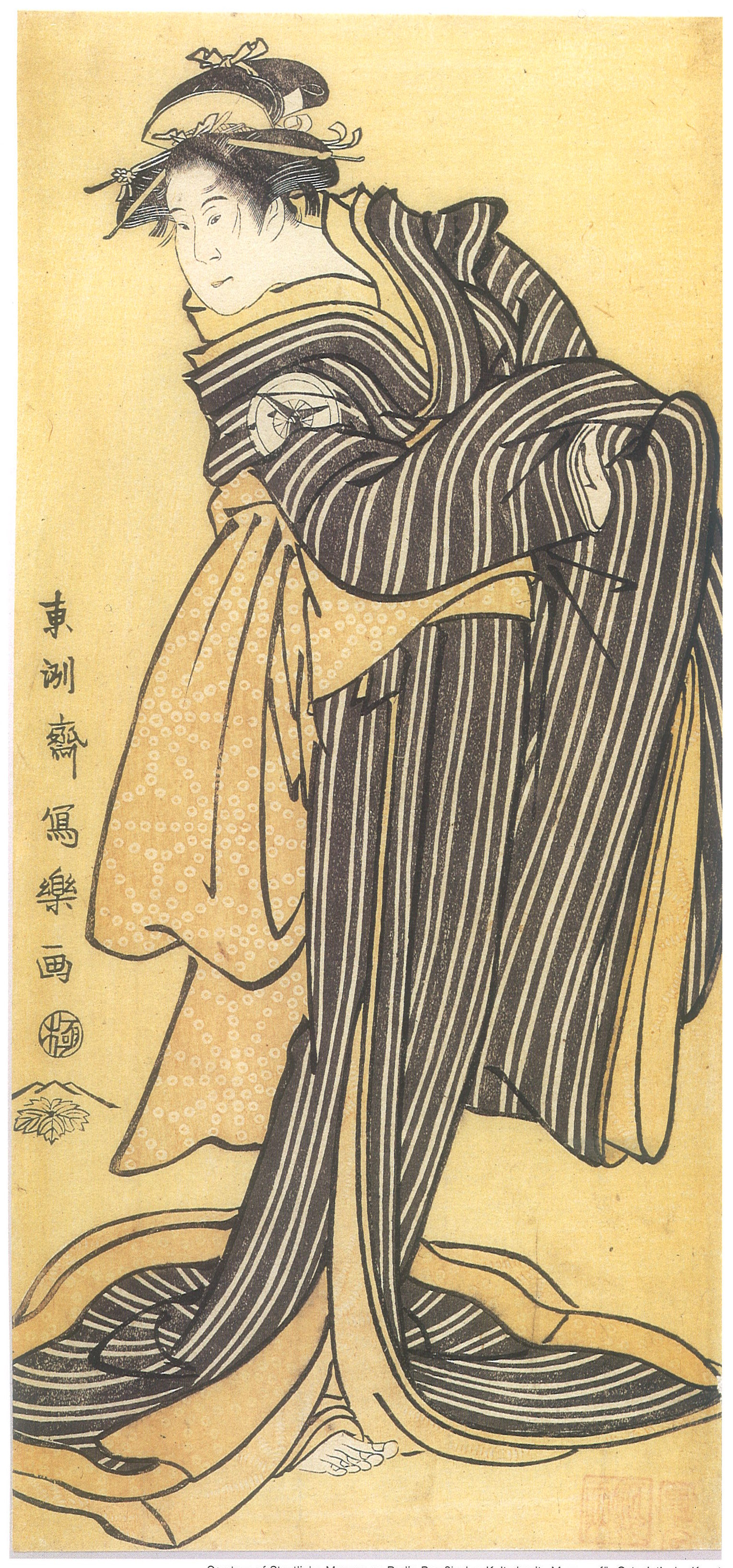

One copy is known of the hosoban print of Iwai Hanshirō IV as O-Han of the Shinanoya (四世岩井半四郎の信濃屋お半 Yonsei Iwai no Hanshirō Shinanoya O-Han); it is in the collection of the Museum of Asian Art.

==== Iwai Kiyotarō II as O-Sode, daughter of Futamiya ====
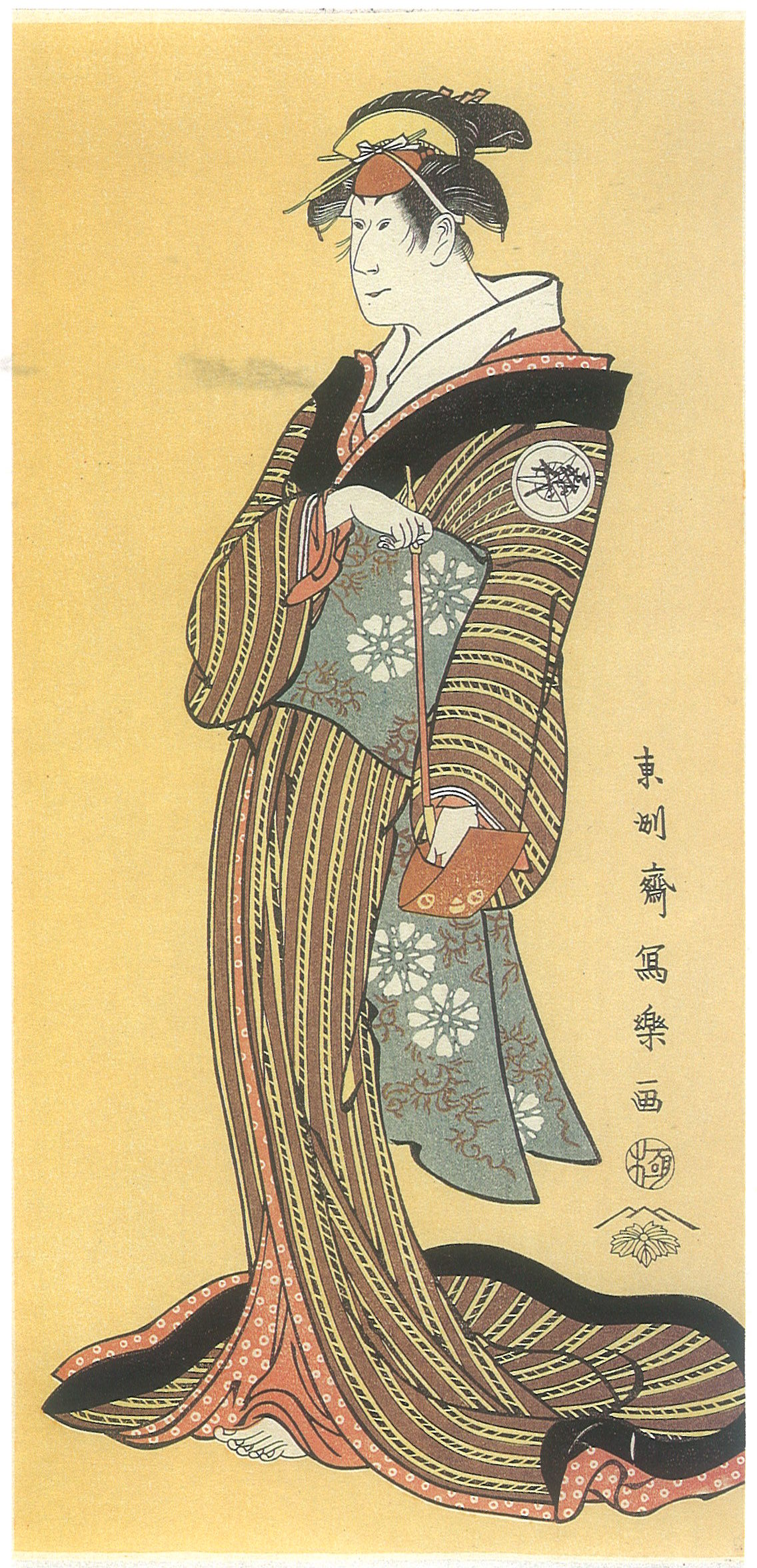

One copy is known of the hosoban print of Iwai Kiyotarō II as O-Sode, daughter of Futamiya (二世岩井喜代太郎の二見屋娘お袖 Nisei Iwai Kiyotarō no Futamiya musume O-Sode); it is in the collection of the Hiraki Ukiyo-e Foundation.

==== Tanimura Torazō I as Kataoka Kōemon ====
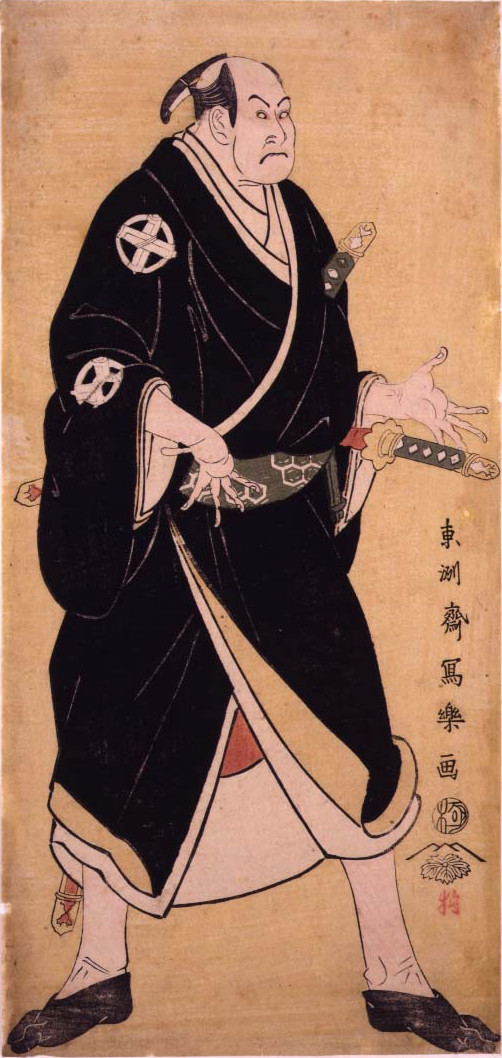

One copy is known of the hosoban print of Tanimura Torazō I as Kataoka Kōemon (初世谷村虎蔵の片岡幸右衛門 Shosei Tanimura Torazō no Kataoka Kōemon); it is in the collection of the Tokyo National Museum.

==== Ichikawa Ebizō I as Ranmyaku no Kichi ====
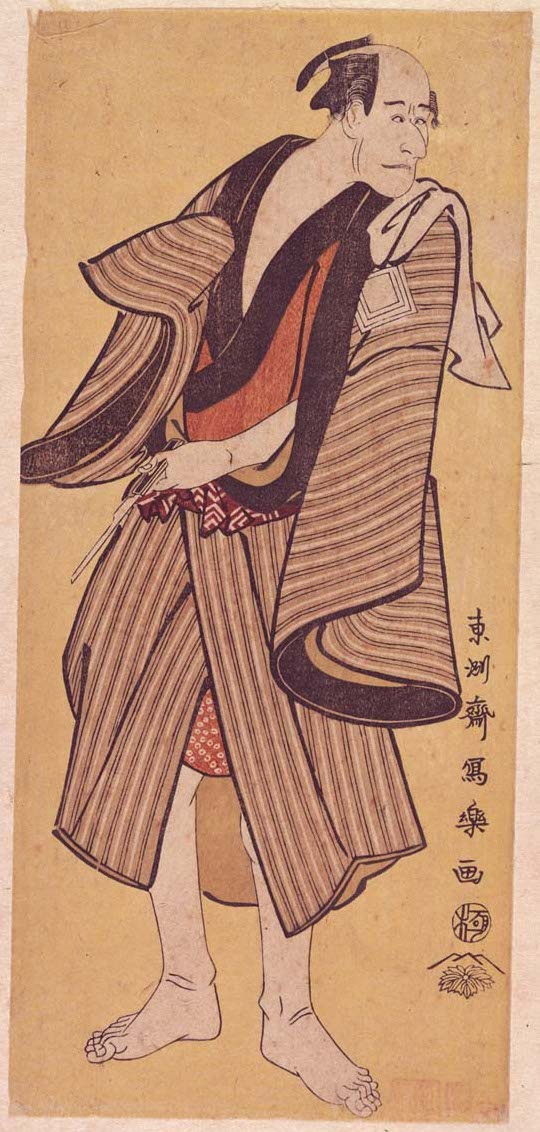

One copy is known of the hosoban print of Ichikawa Ebizō I as Ranmyaku no Kichi (初世市川鰕蔵のらんみゃくの吉 Shosei Ichikawa Ebizō no Ranmyaku no Kichi); it is in the collection of the Tokyo National Museum.

==== Osagawa Tsuneyo II as Okinu, wife of Chōemon ====
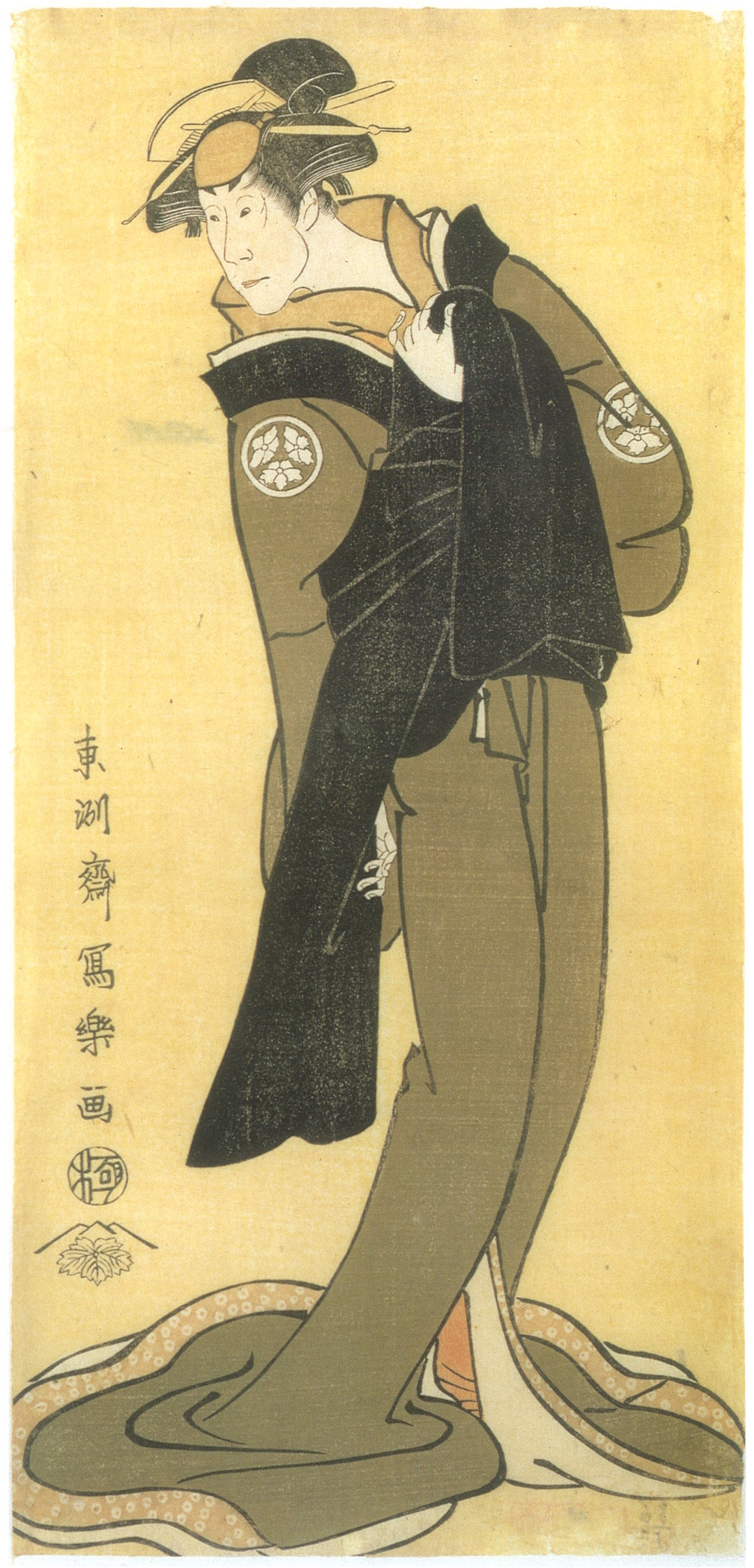

One copy is known of the hosoban print of Osagawa Tsuneyo II as Chōemon's wife Okinu (二世小佐川常世の長右衛門妻おきぬ Osagawa Tsuneyo no Chōemon tsuma Okinu); it is in the collection of the Rijksmuseum.

==== Bandō Hikosaburō III as Obiya Chōemon, and Iwai Hanshirō IV as O-Han of the Shinanoya ====
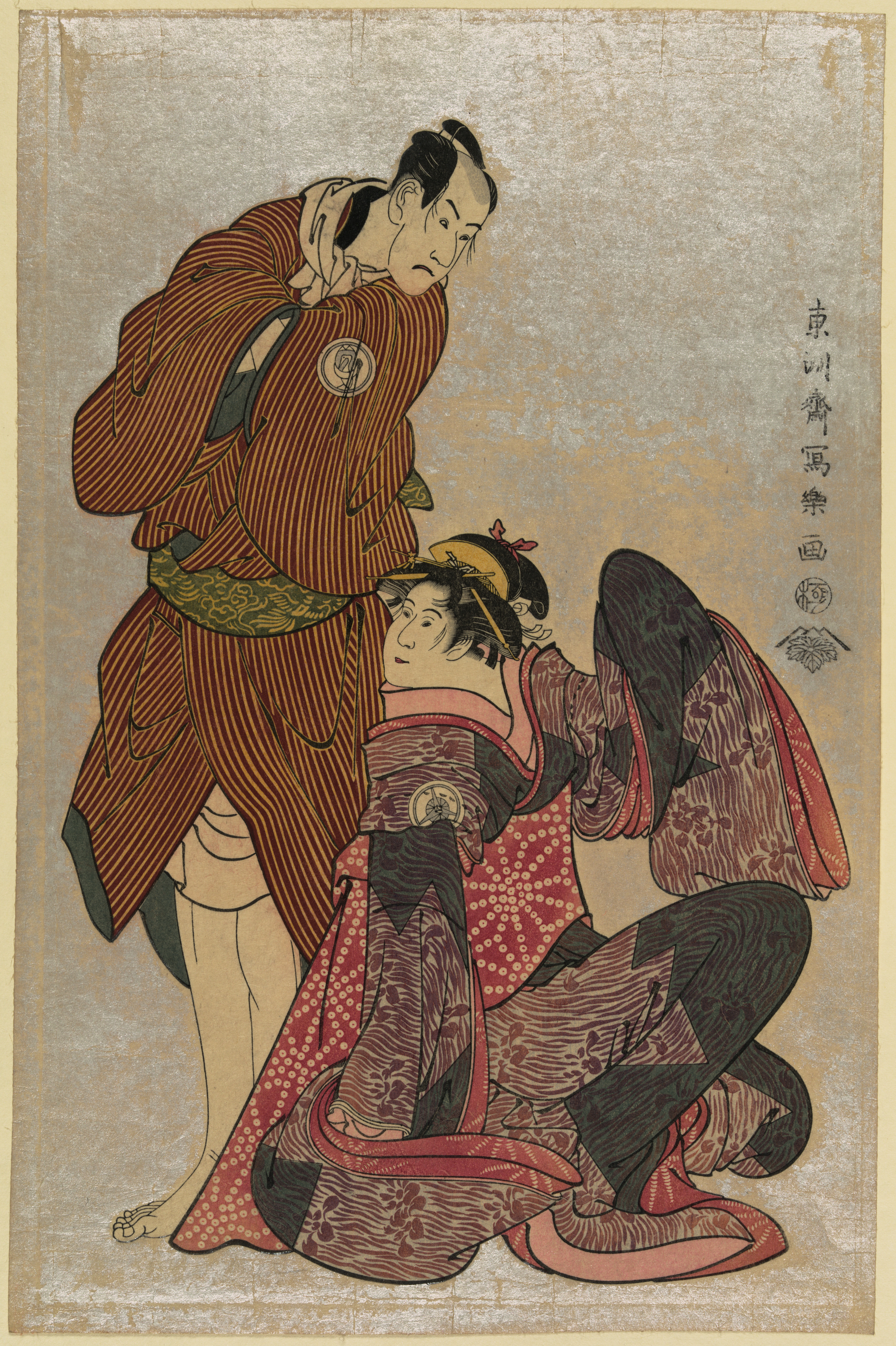

Three copies are known of the ōban print of Bandō Hikosaburō III as Obiya Chōemon and Iwai Hanshirō IV as O-Han of the Shinanoya (三世坂東彦三郎の帯屋長右衛門と四世岩井半四郎の信濃屋お半 Sansei Bandō Hikosaburō no Obiya Chōemon to Yonsei Iwai no Hanshirō Shinanoya O-Han), one each in the Art Institute of Chicago, the Grabhorn Collection at the Asian Art Museum of San Francisco, and the Metropolitan Museum of Art.

== Third period ==
47 hosoban, 13 aiban, and 4 ōban prints make up the third period (1794–1795). They appeared in the eleventh month of the 6th year of Kansei.

11 of the 13 aiban prints are ōkubi yakusha-e. Amongst the details that set these works apart from Sharaku's earlier and later ones are the inclusion of a crest in the corner of each, and five of these prints feature clearly visible ears drawn with six lines, whereas those of Sharaku's other works are drawn with five lines. Hiroshi Matsuki proposed that these 11 prints could be attributed to Kabukidō Enkyō, an artist who produced 7 known prints in c. 1796 and whose identity is unknown. Enkyō is the only other ukiyo-e artist known to have produced aiban-sized ōkubi-e yakusha-e during the Edo period.

=== Uruō Toshi Meika no Homare ===
Uruō Toshi Meika no Homare (閏訥子名和歌誉) débuted at the Miyako-za in the 11th month of the 6th year of Gansei.

==== Arashi Ryūzō II as Ōtomo Yamanushi ====
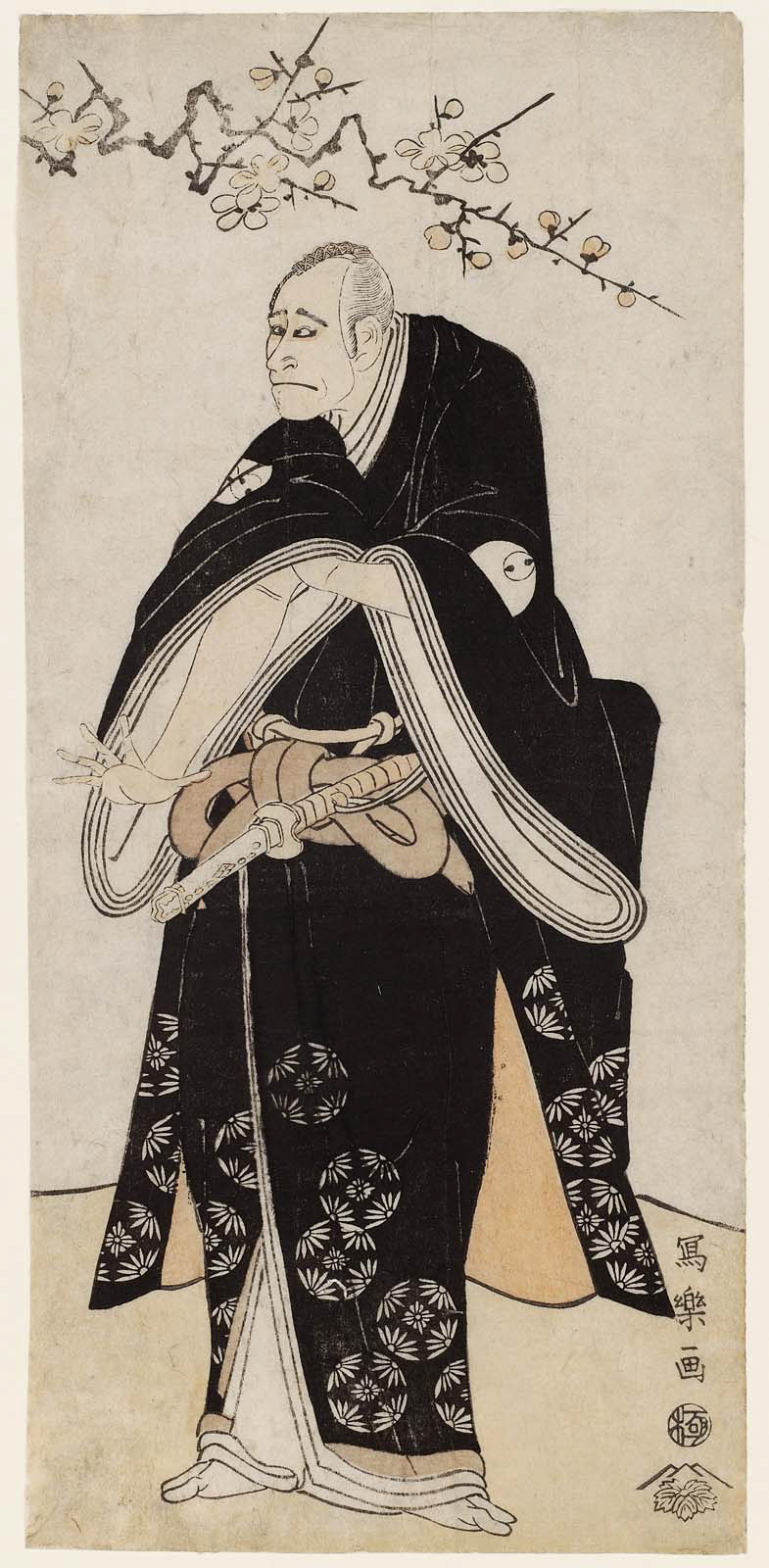

Four copies are known of hosoban print of Arashi Ryūzō II as Ōtomo Yamanushi (二世嵐竜蔵の大友山主 Nisei Arashi Ryūzō no Ōtomo Yamanushi), one each in the collections of the Museum of Fine Arts, Boston, the Grabhorn Collection at the Asian Art Museum of San Francisco, the Guimet Museum, and the Minneapolis Institute of Art.

==== Sanokawa Ichimatsu III as Ihohata ====
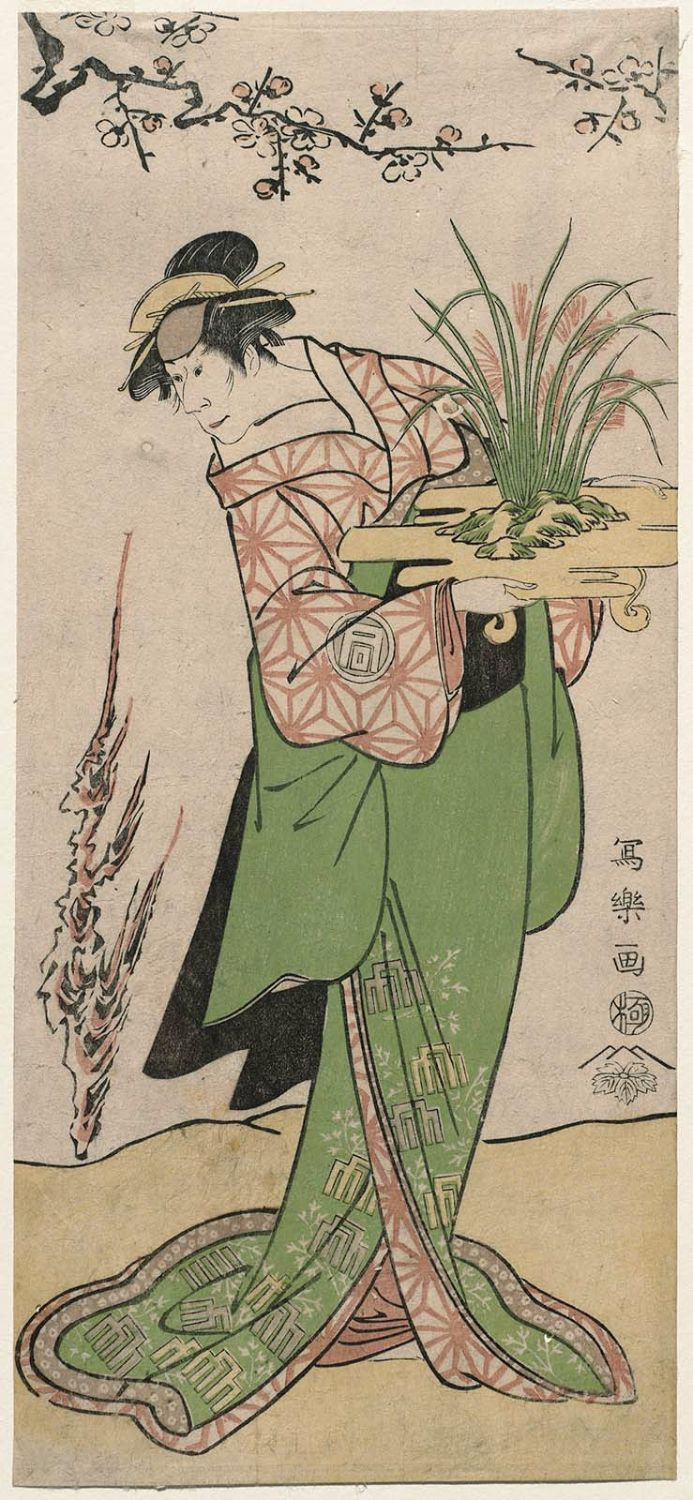

Two copies of the hosoban print of Sanokawa Ichimatsu III as Ihohata (三世佐野川市松のいほはた Sansei Sanokawa Ichimatsu no Ihohata) are known, one in the collection of Tokyo National Museum and the other at the Museum of Fine Arts, Boston.

==== Bandō Mitsugorō III as Katsura Kokingo Haruhisa ====
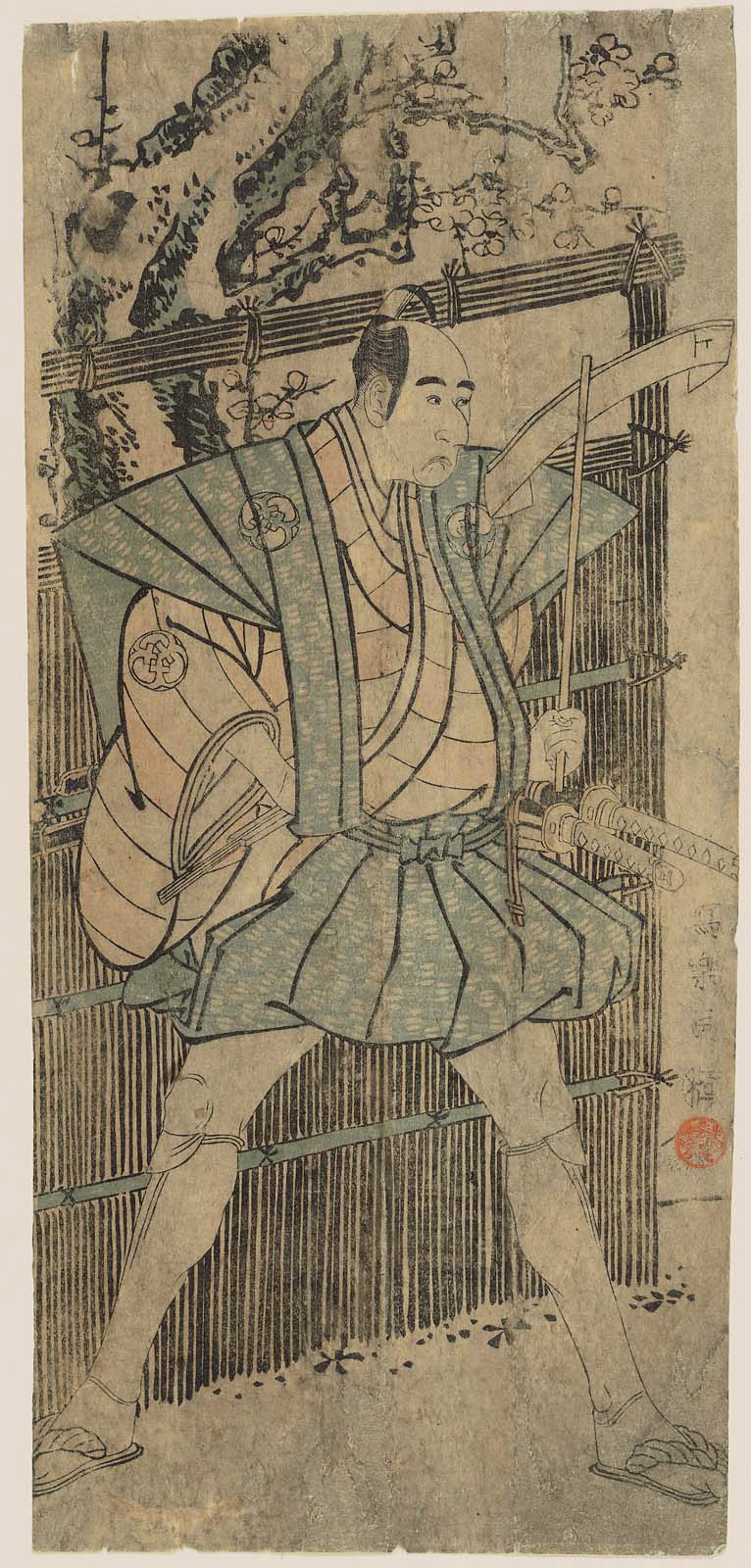

One copy is known of the hosoban print of Bandō Mitsugorō III as Katsura Kokingo Haruhisa (三世坂東三津五郎の桂金吾春久, Sansei Bandō Mitsugorō no Katsura Kokingo Haruhisa) and is at the Museum of Fine Arts, Boston.

==== Segawa Kikunojō III as Yamato Manzai, actually the shirabyōshi Hisakata ====
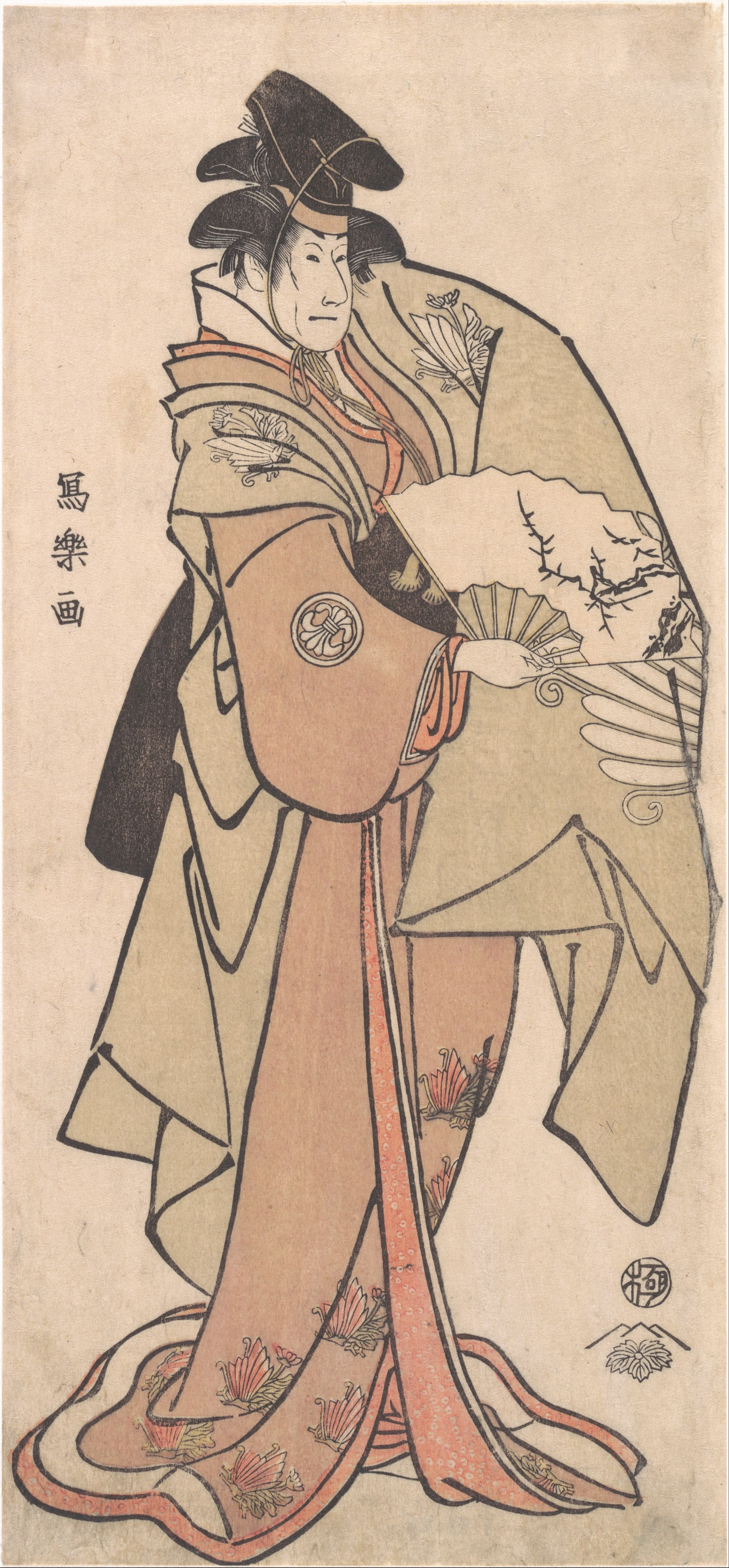

Three copies are known of the hosoban print of Segawa Kikunojō III as the shirabyōshi Hisakata disguised as Yamato Manzai (三世瀬川菊之丞の大和万歳実は都九条の白拍子久かた Sansei Segawa Kikunojō no Yamato Manzai, jitsu wa shirabyōshi Hisakata); one copy each in the collections of the Tokyo National Museum, the Museum of Asian Art, and the Metropolitan Museum of Art.

This print pairs with Nakamura Nakazō II as Saizō Saiwaka and comes from the fourth part of Uruō Toshi Meika no Homare, Ōshukubai Koi no Hatsune (鴬宿梅恋初音). Saiwaka and Manzai emerge from the hanamichi and perform a seated dance with three other characters. Manzai then acts as one of the go-betweens in a love affair between Princess Konohana and Munesada.

==== Nakamura Nakazō II as Saizō Saiwaka, actually Aramaki Mimishirō Taketora ====
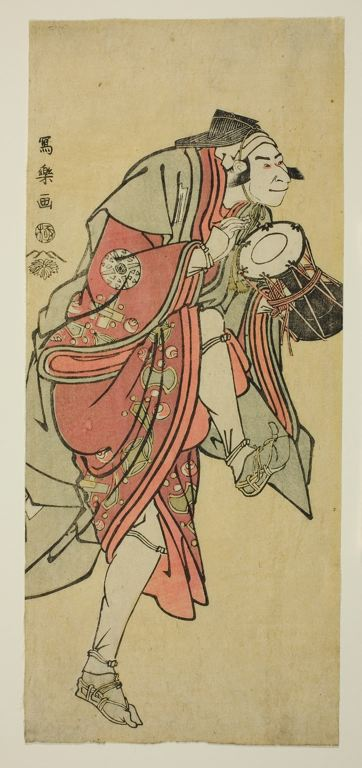

One copy is known of the hosoban print of Nakamura Nakazō II as Aramaki Mimishirō Taketora disguised as Saizō Saiwaka (二世中村仲蔵の才蔵才若、実は荒巻耳四郎金虎, Nisei Nakamura Nakazō no Saizō Saiwaka, jitsu wa Aramaki Mimishirō Taketora); it is at the Art Institute of Chicago.

This print pairs with Segawa Kikunojō III as Yamato Manzai and comes from the fourth part of Uruō Toshi Meika no Homare, Ōshukubai Koi no Hatsune (鴬宿梅恋初音). Saiwaka and Manzai emerge from the hanamichi and perform a seated dance with three other characters. Saiwaka then acts as one of the go-betweens in a love affair between Princess Konohana and Munesada before finally revealing himself as Aramaki Mimishirō before Hatano Daizen Taketora.

Nakamura Nakazō II succeeded to this stage name in the eleventh month of Kansei 6; before this he was known as Ōtani Oniji III, who appears in several other Sharaku prints, including Ōtani Oniji III as the manservant Edobei.

==== Nakamura Nakazō II as Aramaki Mimishirō Kanetora ====
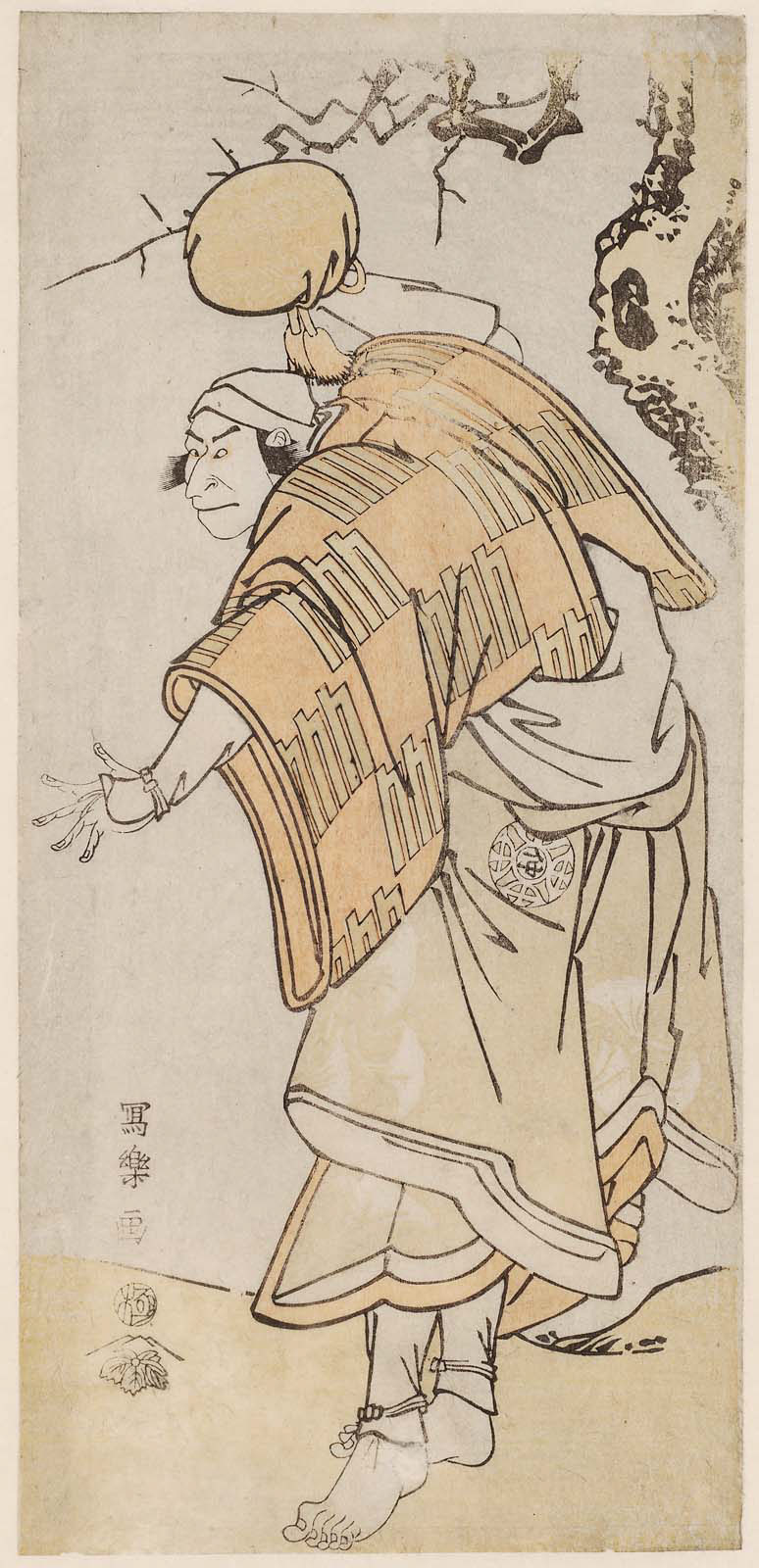

Two copies known of the hosoban print of Nakamura Nakazō II as Aramaki Mimishirō Kanetora (二世中村仲蔵の荒巻耳四郎金虎, Nisei Nakamura Nakazō no Aramaki Mimishirō Kanetora), one each at the Art Institute of Chicago and the Museum of Fine Arts, Boston.

==== Nakamura Noshio II as Ki no Tsurayuki's daughter Konohana ====
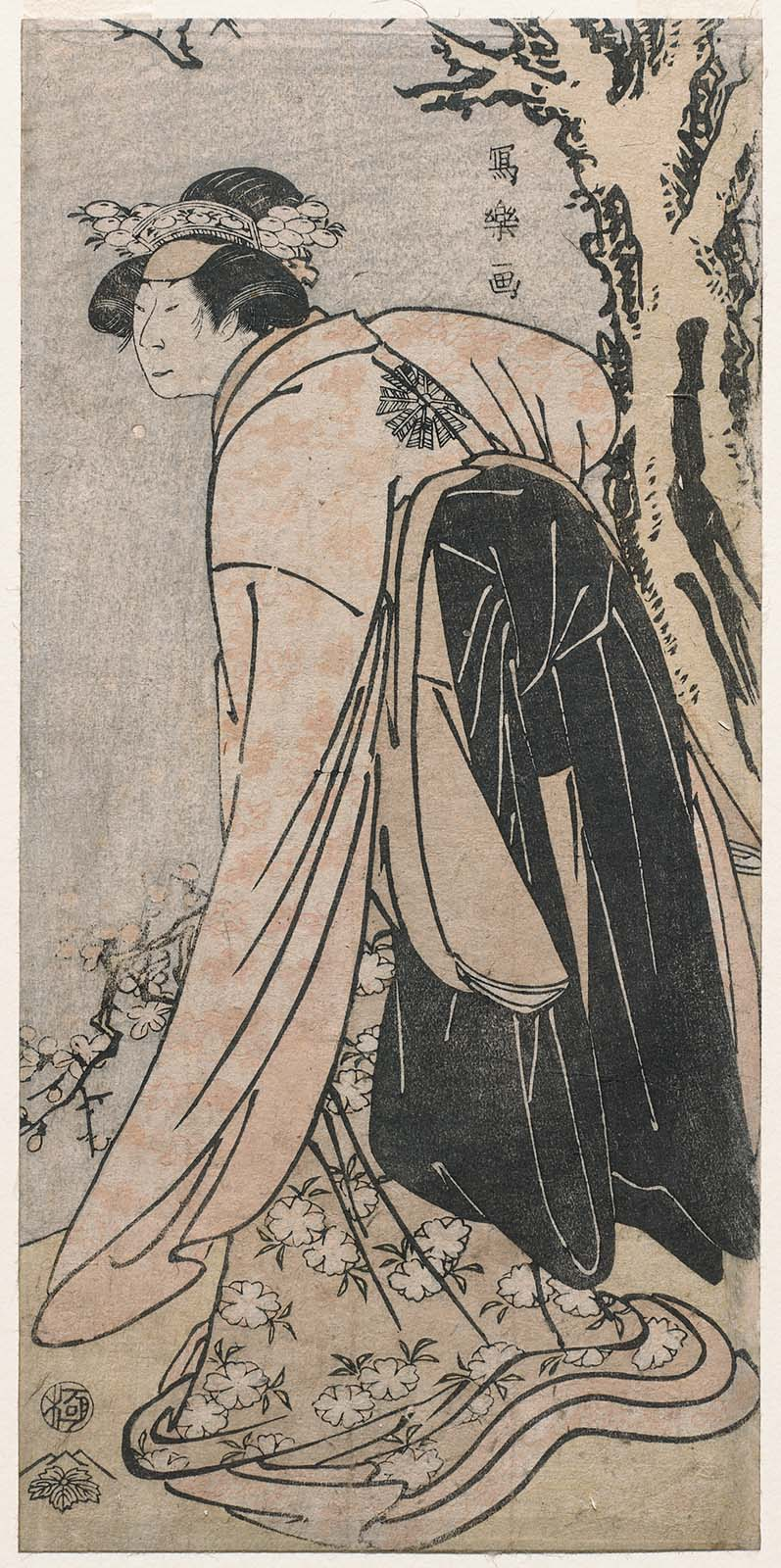

One copy is known of the hosoban print of Nakamura Noshio II as the poet Ki no Tsurayuki's daughter Konohana (二世中村野塩のしおの紀貫之娘この花 Nisei Nakamura Noshio no Ki no Tsurayuki musume Konohana); it is at the Museum of Fine Arts, Boston.

==== Segawa Kikunojō III as the shirabyōshi Hisakata of Miyako Kujō ====
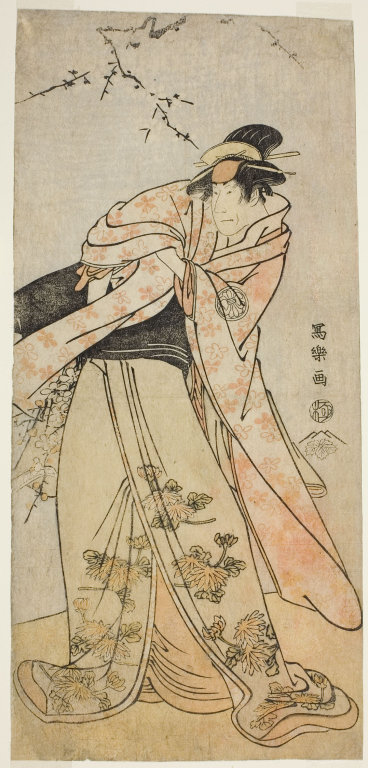

One copy is known of the hosoban print of Segawa Kikunojō III as the shirabyōshi Hisakata of Miyako Kujō (三世瀬川菊之丞の都九条の白拍子久かた Sansei Segawa Kikunojō no Miyako Kujō no shirabyōshi Hisakata) and is at the Art Institute of Chicago.

==== Sawamura Sōjūrō III as Kujaku Saburō Narihira (hosoban) ====
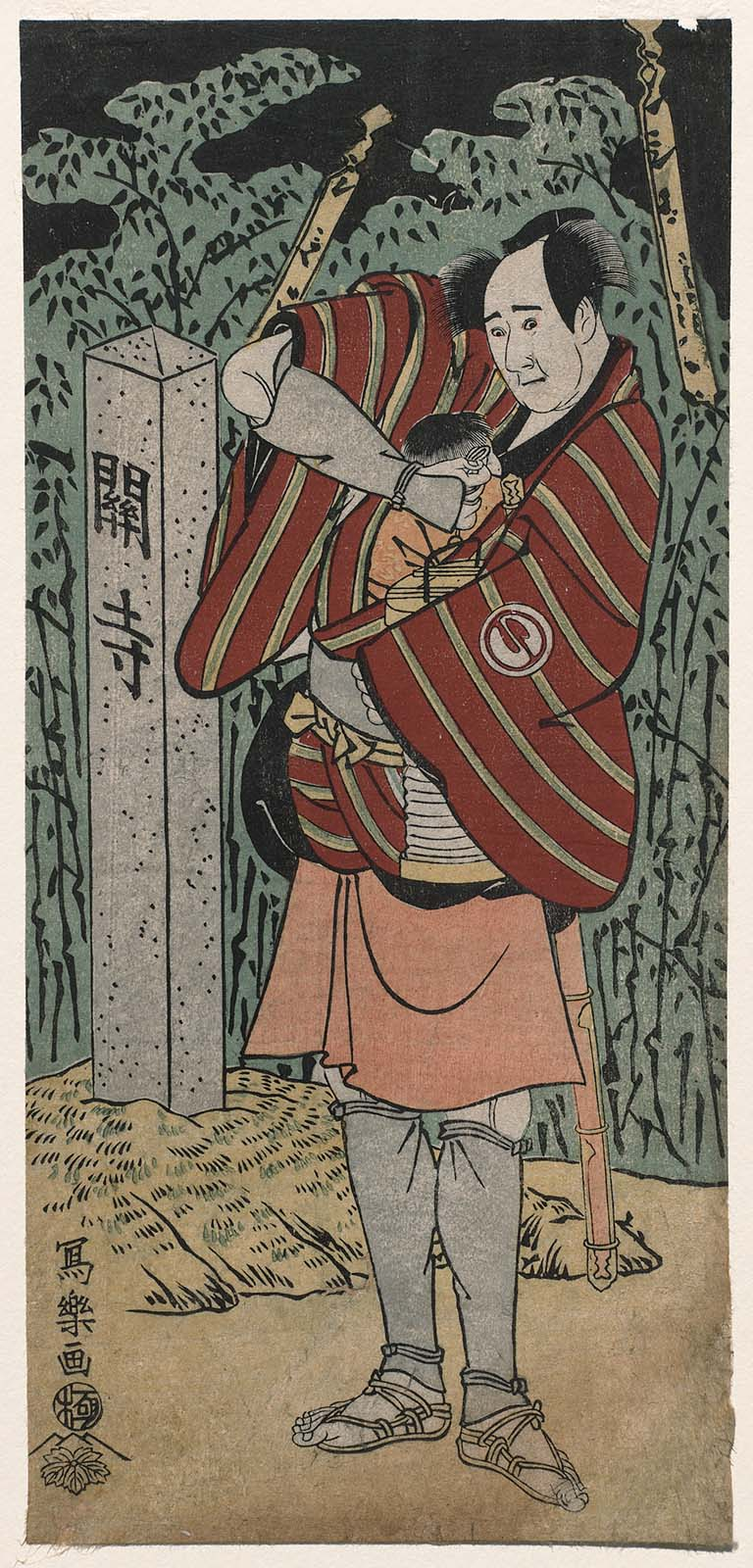

Four copies are known of the hosoban print of Sawamura Sōjūrō III as Kujaku Saburō Narihira (三世沢村宗十郎の孔雀三郎なり平 Sansei Sawamura Sōjūrō Kujaku Saburō Narihira), one each in the collections of the Tokyo National Museum, the Ukiyo-e Ōta Memorial Museum of Art, the Royal Library of Belgium, and the Art Institute of Chicago.

==== Kataoka Nizaemon VII as Ki no Natora ====
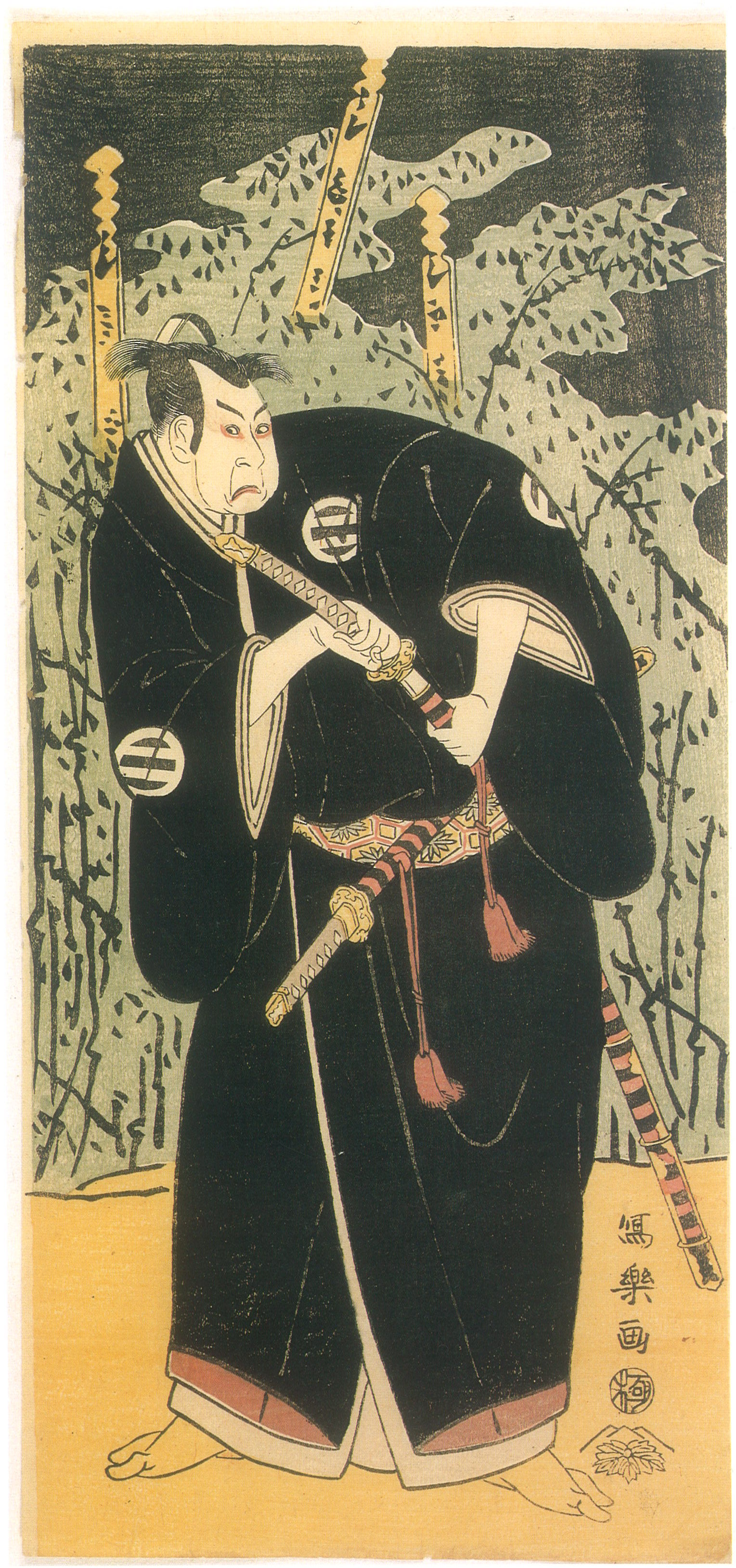

One copy is known of the hosoban print of Kataoka Nizaemon VII as Ki no Natora; it is at the Ukiyo-e Ōta Memorial Museum of Art.

==== Segawa Kikunojō III as Hanazono, wife of Ōtomo no Kuronushi ====
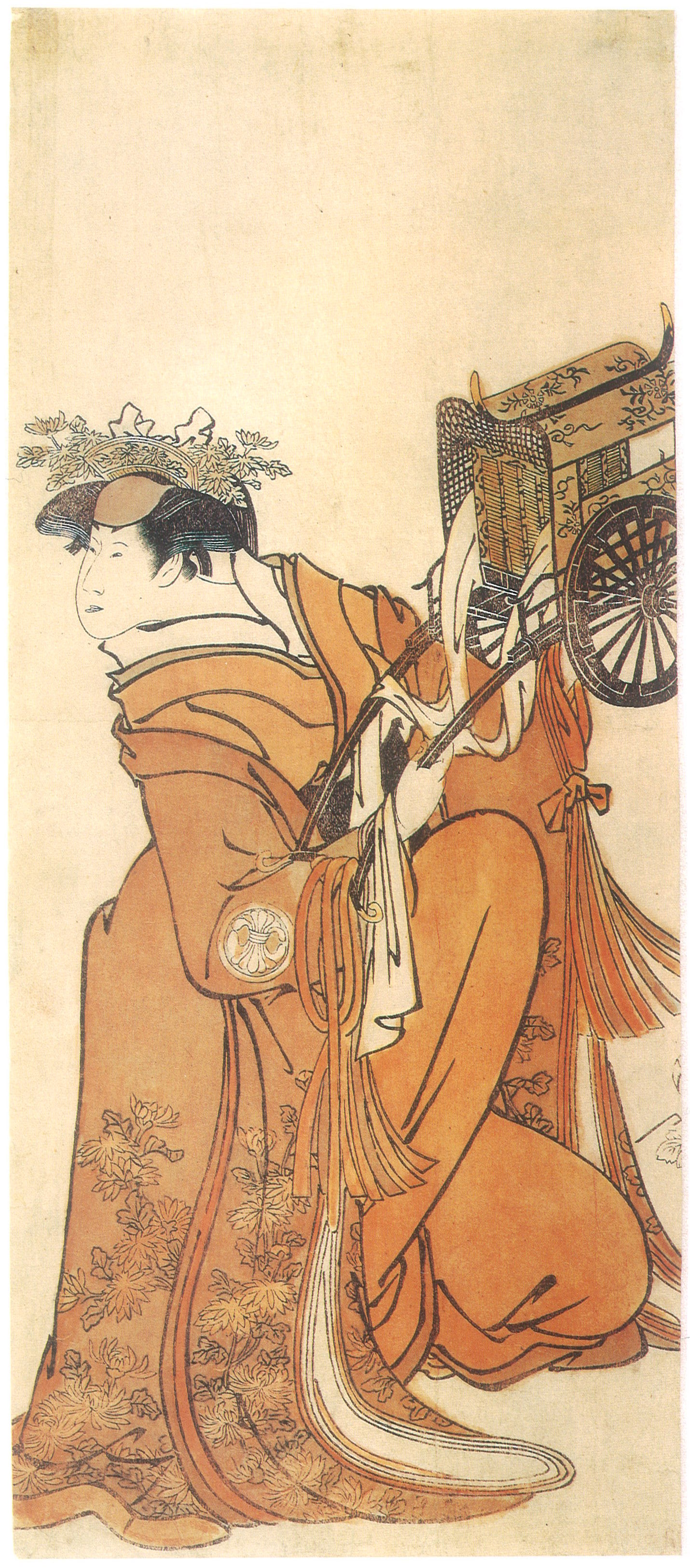

One copy of the hosoban print of Segawa Kikunojō III as Hanazono, wife of Ōtomo no Kuronushi (三世瀬川菊之丞の大伴の黒主妻花園御前); it is in a private collection.

==== Sawamura Sōjūrō III as Ōtomo no Kuronushi ====
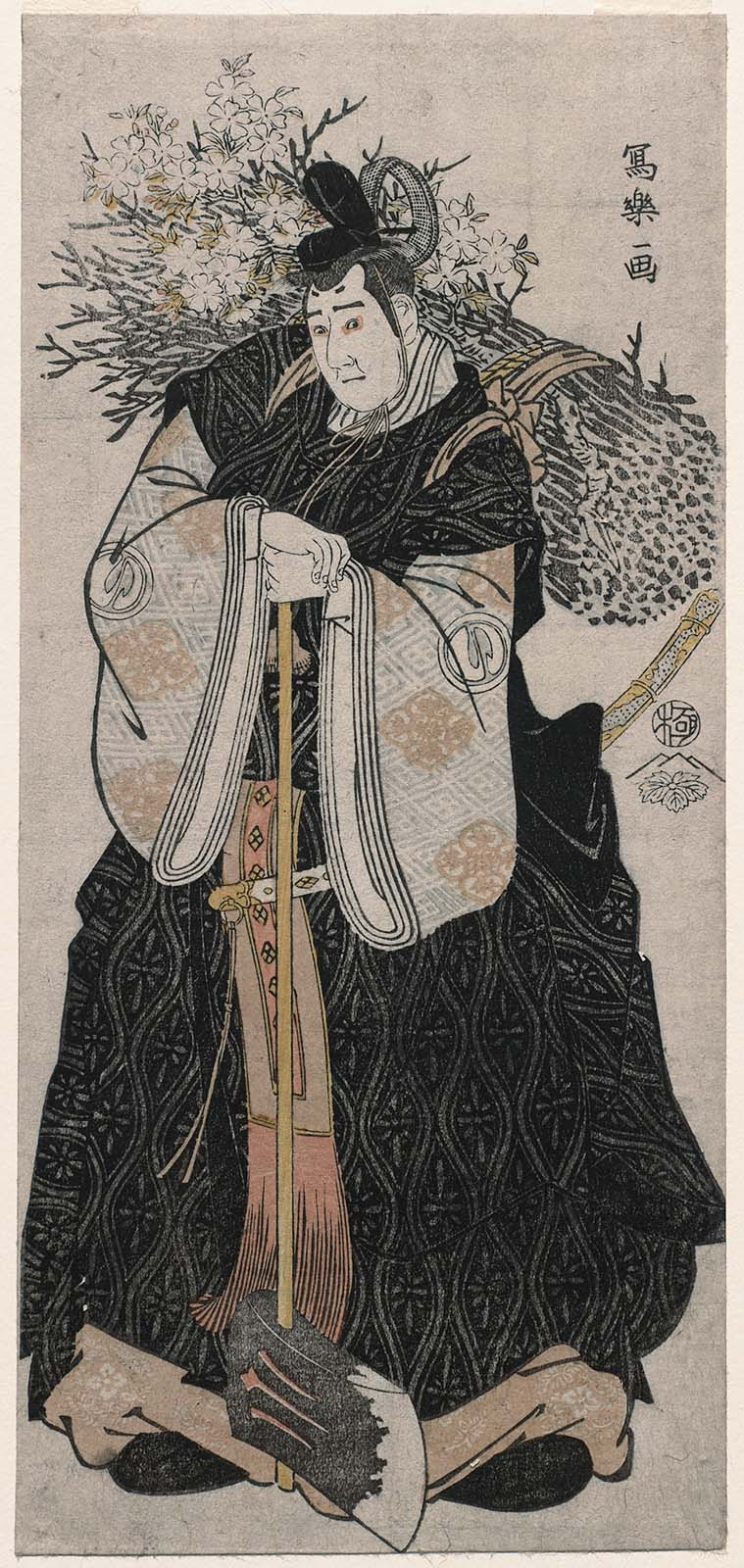

Six copies are known of the hosoban print of Sawamura Sōjūrō III as the poet Ōtomo no Kuronushi, one each at the Tokyo National Museum, the Ukiyo-e Ōta Memorial Museum of Art, the Edoardo Chiossone Museum of Oriental Art, and the Nelson-Atkins Museum of Art, and two at the Museum of Fine Arts, Boston.

==== Nakamura Noshio II as Ono no Komachi ====
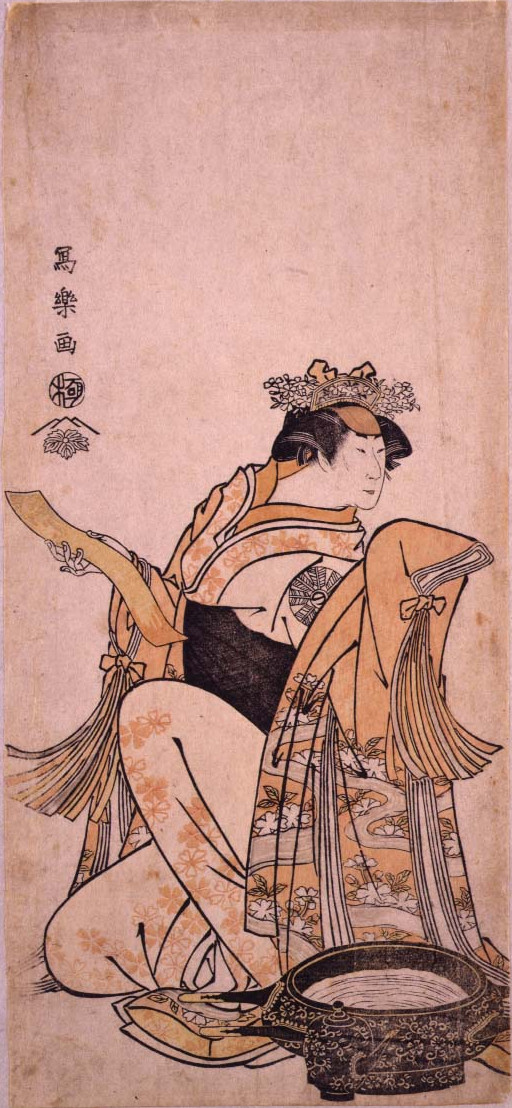

Three copies are known of the hosoban print of Nakamura Noshio II as the poet Ono no Komachi (二世中村野塩の小野小町 Nisei Nakamura Noshio no Ono no Komachi), one each at the Tokyo National Museum, the Ukiyo-e Ōta Memorial Museum of Art, and one in a private collection.

==== Bandō Hikosaburō III as Godai Saburō Chikatada ====
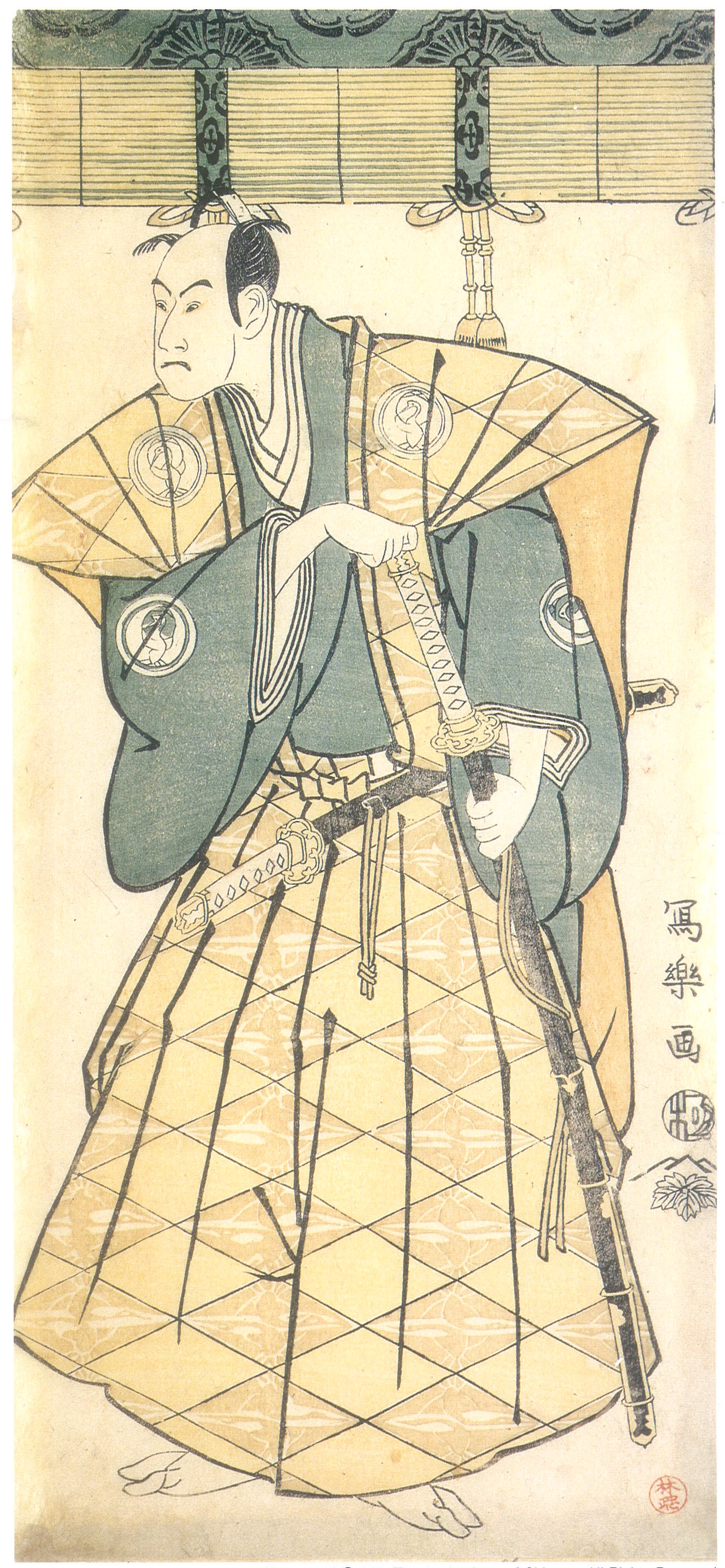

Two copies of the hosoban print of Bandō Hikosaburō III as Godai Saburō are known, one at the Art Institute of Chicago and the other in the Grabhorn Collection at the Asian Art Museum of San Francisco.

==== Segawa Tomisaburō II as the Ōtomos' maid Wakakusa, actually Prince Koretaka ====
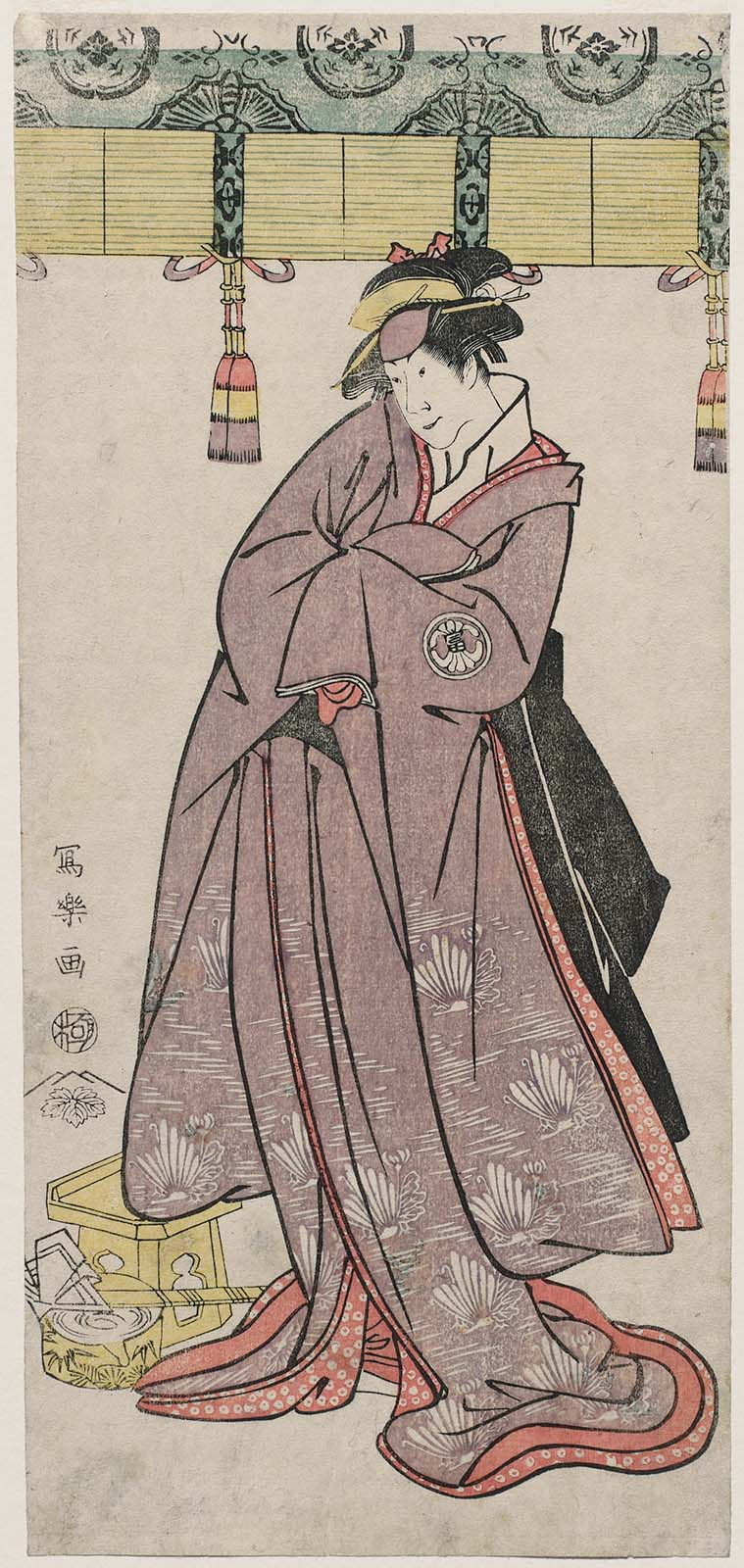

double check this

Three copies of the hosoban print of Segawa Tomisaburō II as Prince Koretaka disguised as the Ōtomos' maid Wakakusa are known, one each in the collections of the Museum of Fine Arts, Boston, the Art Institute of Chicago, and the Metropolitan Museum of Art.

==== Ōtani Hiroji III as Hata no Daizen Taketora ====
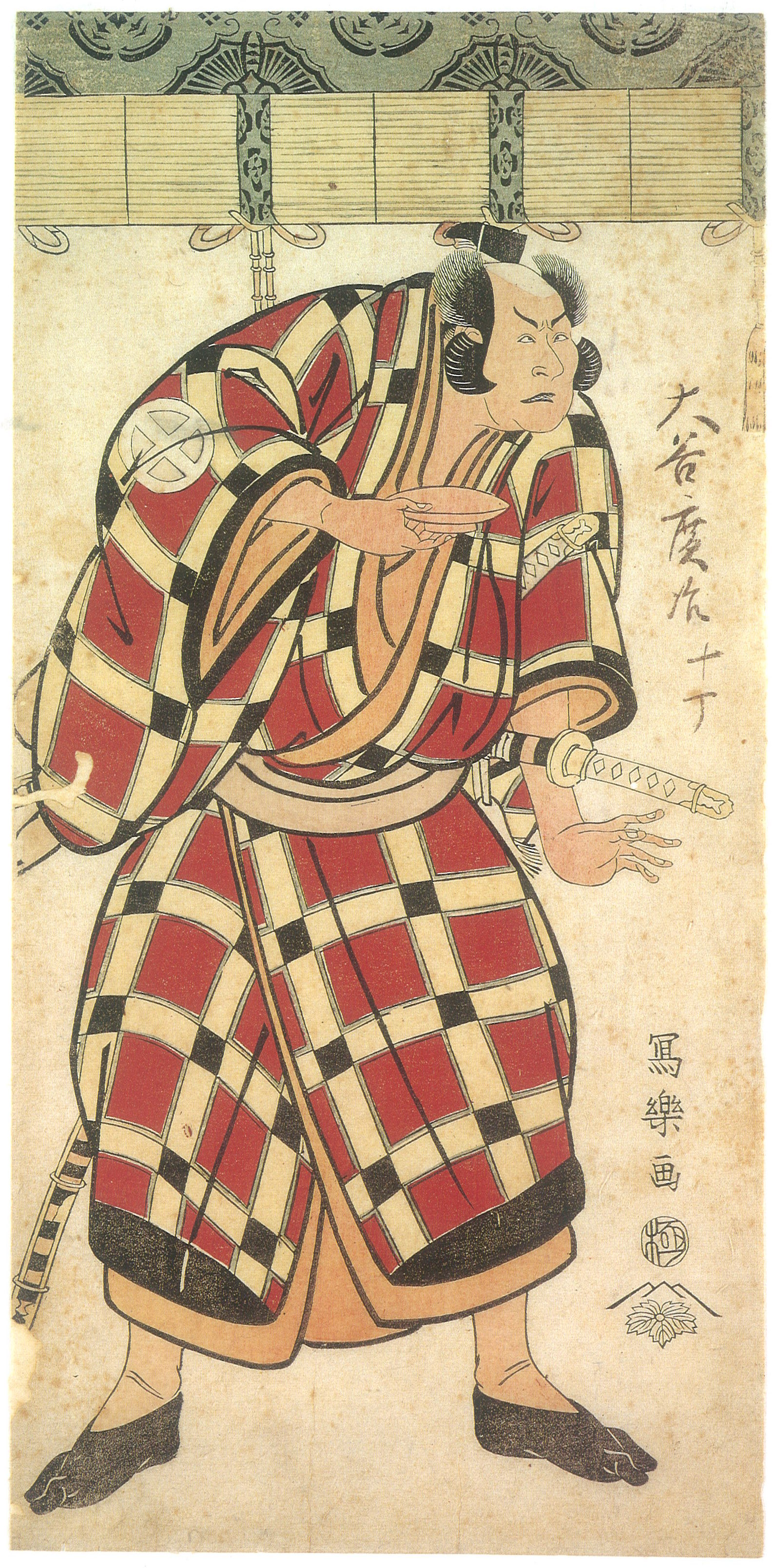

One copy of the hosoban print of Ōtani Hiroji III as Hata no Daizen Taketora (三世大谷広次の秦の大膳武とら Sansei Ōtani Hiroji no Hata no Daizen Taketora) is known and is at the Tokyo National Museum.

==== Nakamura Nakazō II as the farmer Tsuchizō, actually Prince Koretaka ====
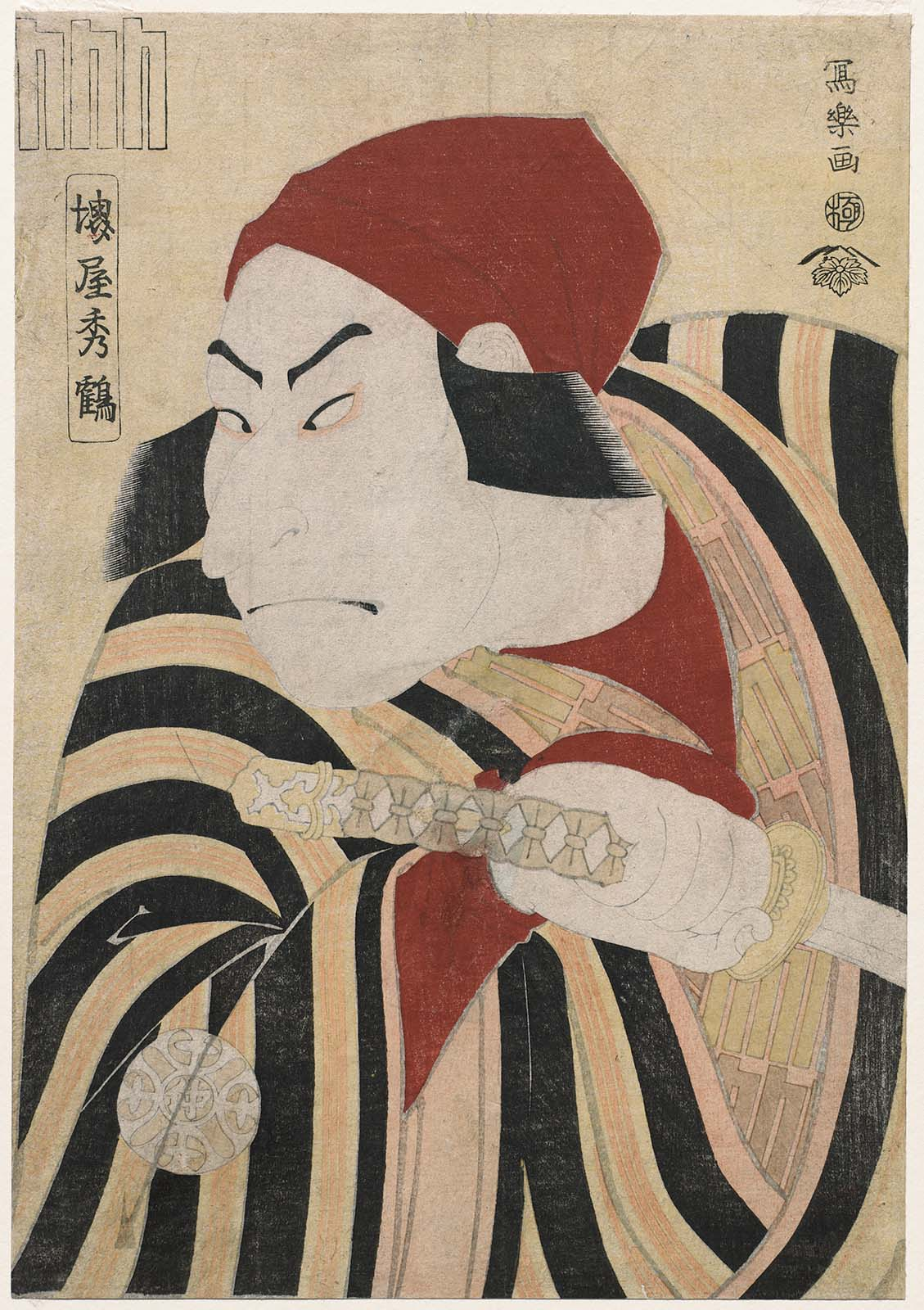

Three copies are known of the aiban print of Nakamura Nakazō II as Prince Koretaka disguised as the farmer Tsuchizō (二世中村仲蔵の百姓つち蔵実は惟高親王 Nisei Nakamura Nakazō no hyakushō Tsuchizō, jitsu wa Koretaka Shinnō), one each in the collections of the Tokyo National Museum, the Museum of Fine Arts, Boston, and the Metropolitan Museum of Art.

==== Sawamura Sōjūrō III as Kujaku Saburō Narihira (Kinokuniya Tosshi) ====
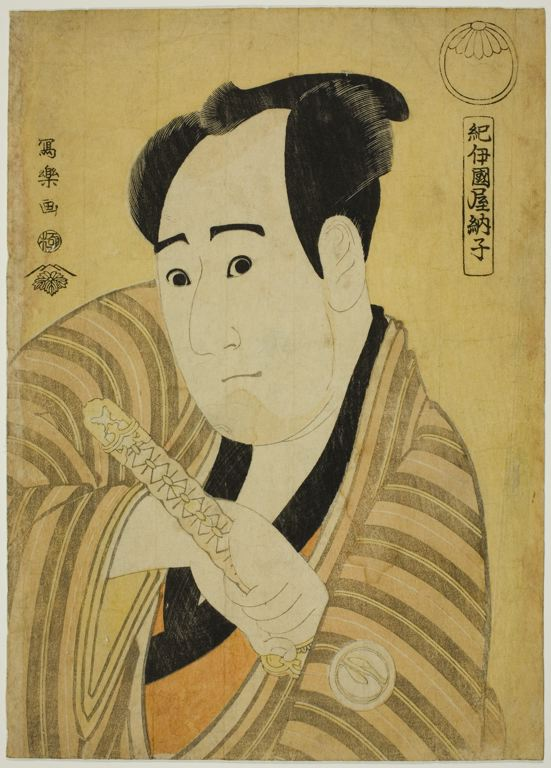

Two copies are known of the aiban print of Sawamura Sōjūrō III as Kujaku Saburō Narihira (三世沢村宗十郎の孔雀三郎なり平（紀伊国屋納子） Sansei Sawamura Sōjūrō Kujaku Saburō Narihira (Kinokuniya Tosshi)), one each in the collections of the Tokyo National Museum and the Art Institute of Chicago.

=== Otokoyama Oedo no Ishizue ===
Otokoyama Oedo no Ishizue (男山御江戸盤石) débuted at the Kiri-za in the 11th month of the 6th year of Gansei.

==== Ichikawa Ebizō I as Kamakura Gongorō Kagemasa ====
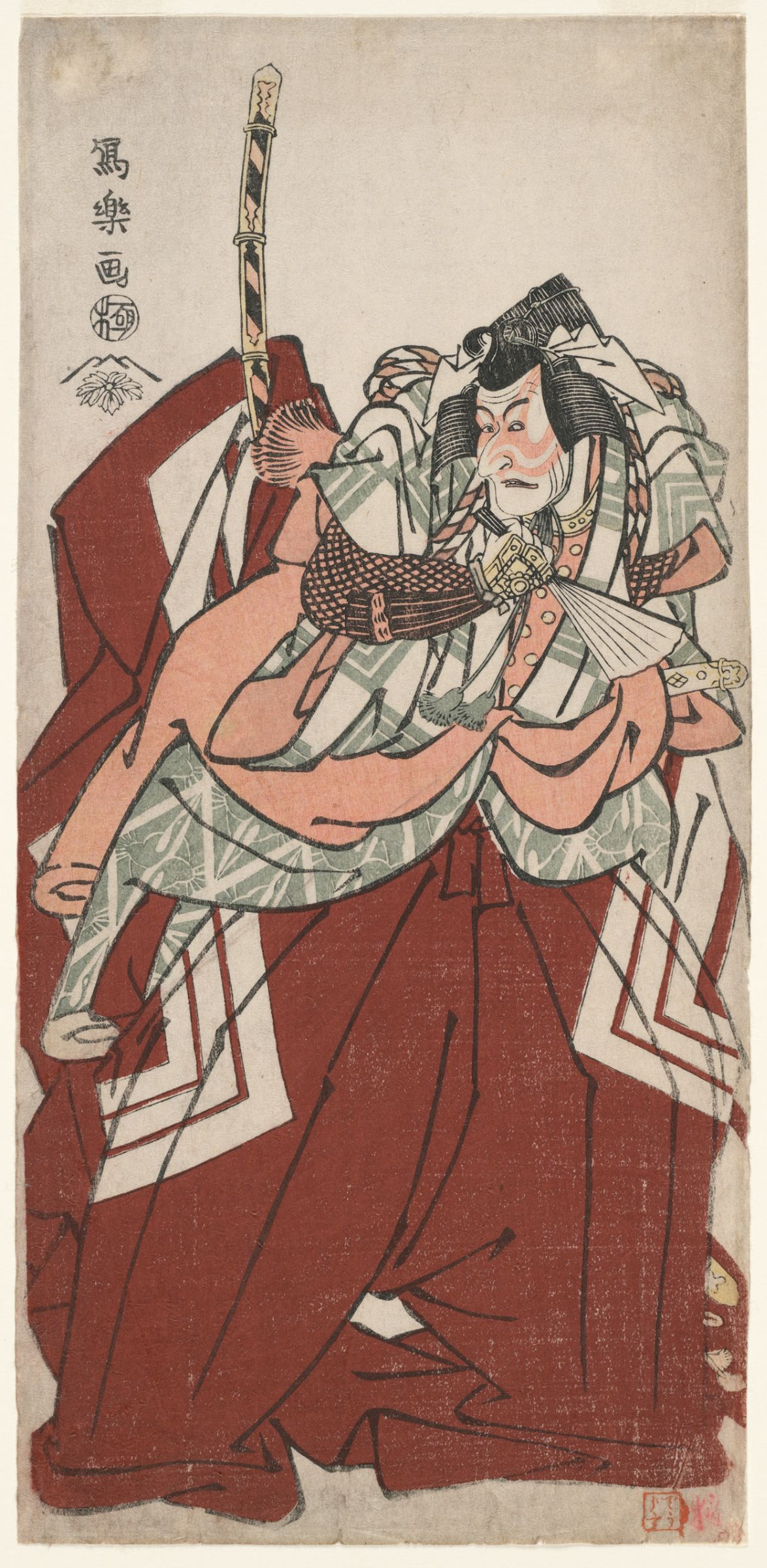

Two copies are known of the hosoban print of Ichikawa Ebizō I as Kamakura Gongorō Kagemasa (初世市川海老蔵の鎌倉権五郎景政 Shosei Ichikawa Ebizō no Kamakura Gongorō Kagemasa), one each in the collections of the Kunsthalle Bremen and the Harvard Arthur M. Sackler Museum.

==== Sakakiyama Sangorō II as Princess Odae, daughter of Michinaga ====
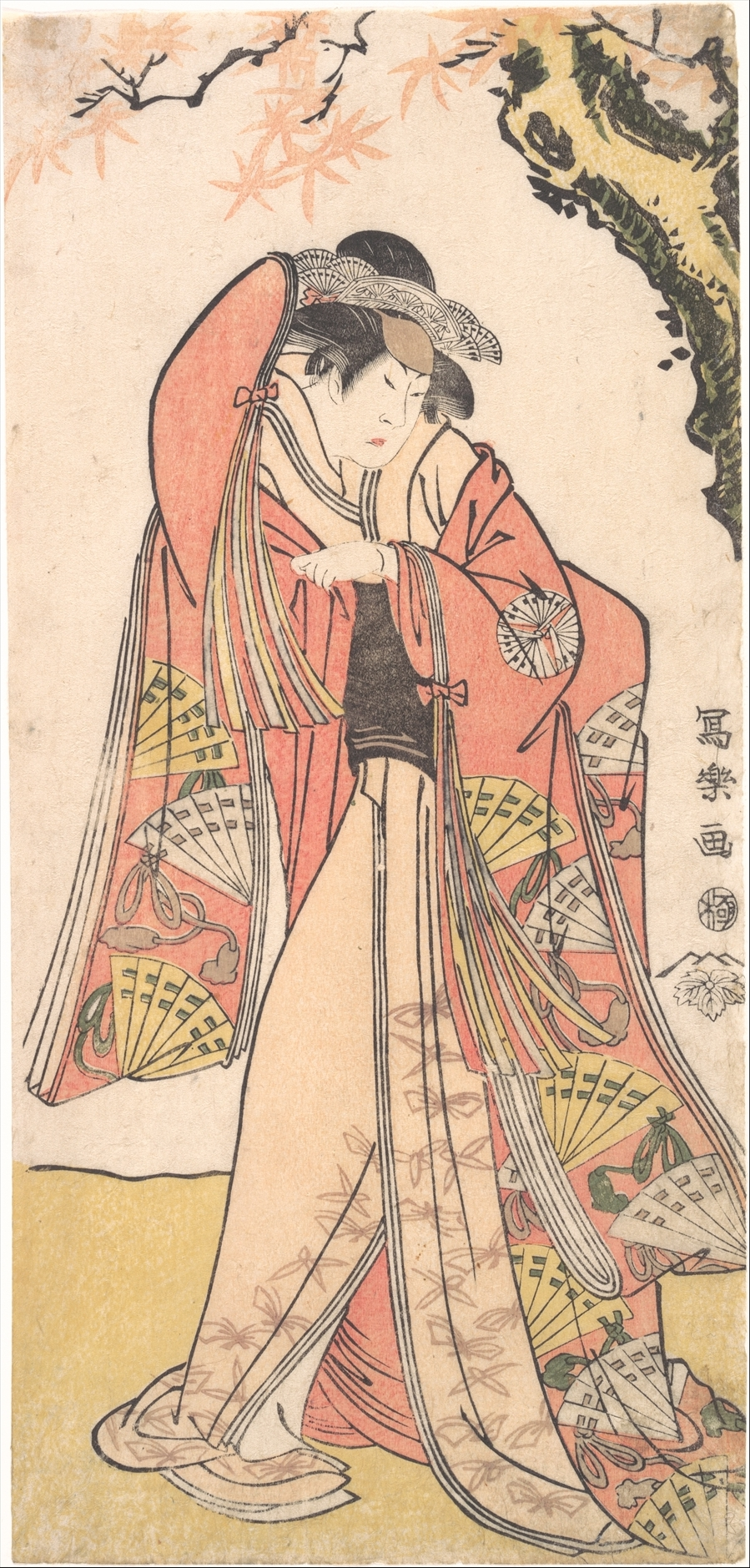

Three copies are known of the hosoban print of Sakakiyama Sangorō II as Michinaga's daughter Princess Odae (榊山三五郎の関白道長の息女おだへ姫 Sakakiyama Sangorō no kanpaku Michinaga no musume Odae-hime), one each in the collections of the Royal Museums of Art and History, the Art Institute of Chicago, and the Metropolitan Museum of Art.

==== Ichikawa Danjūrō VI as Mimana Yukinori ====
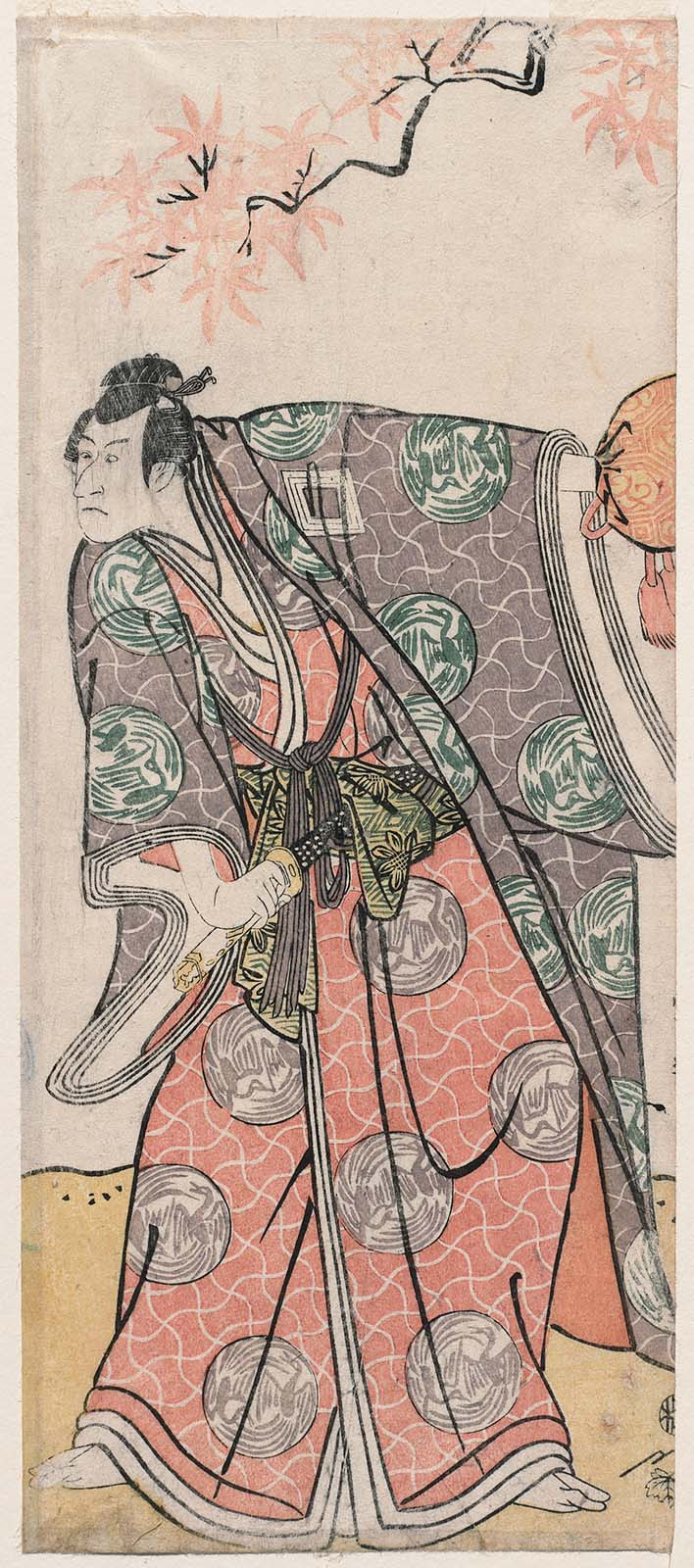

Three copies are known of the hosoban print of Ichikawa Danjūrō VI as Mimana Yukinori (六世市川團十郎のみまな行教 Rokusei Ichikawa Danjūrō no Mimana Yukinori); it is in the collections of the Museum of Fine Arts, Boston, the Kunsthalle Bremen, and the Museum für Kunst und Gewerbe Hamburg.

==== Ichikawa Yaozō III as the sparrow-seller Bunji Yasukata, actually Chūzō Sanekata ====
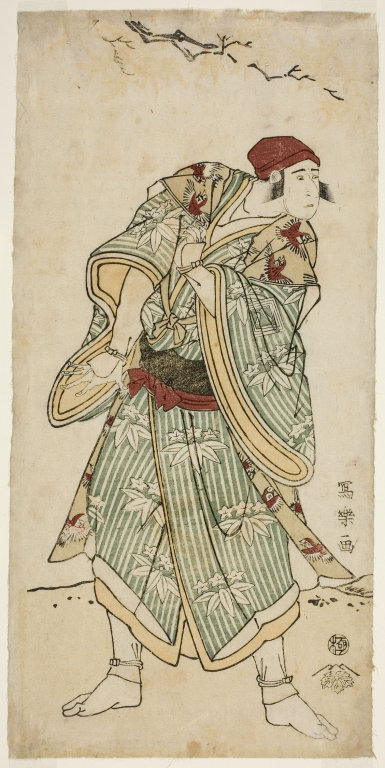

One copy is known of the hosoban print of Ichikawa Yaozō III as Chūzō Sanekata disguised as the sparrow-seller Bunji Yasukata (三世市川八百蔵の雀売文次安方実は中将実方 Sansei Ichikawa Yaozō no suzume-uri Bunji Yasukata jitsu wa Chūzō Sanekata) and is in the collection of the Art Institute of Chicago.

==== Sakata Hangorō III as Yahazu no Yahatei ====
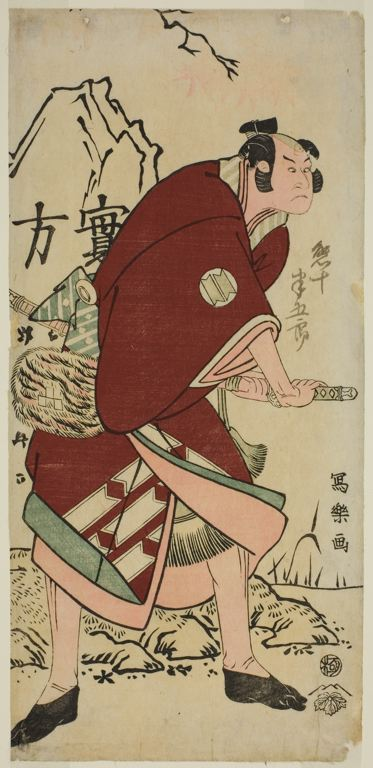

One copy is known of the hosoban print of Sakata Hangorō III as Yahazu no Yahatei (三世坂田半五郎の矢筈の矢田平 Sansei Sakata Hangorō no Yahazu no Yahatei); it is in the collections of the Art Institute of Chicago.

==== Nakayama Tomisaburō I as the cowherd Ofude ====
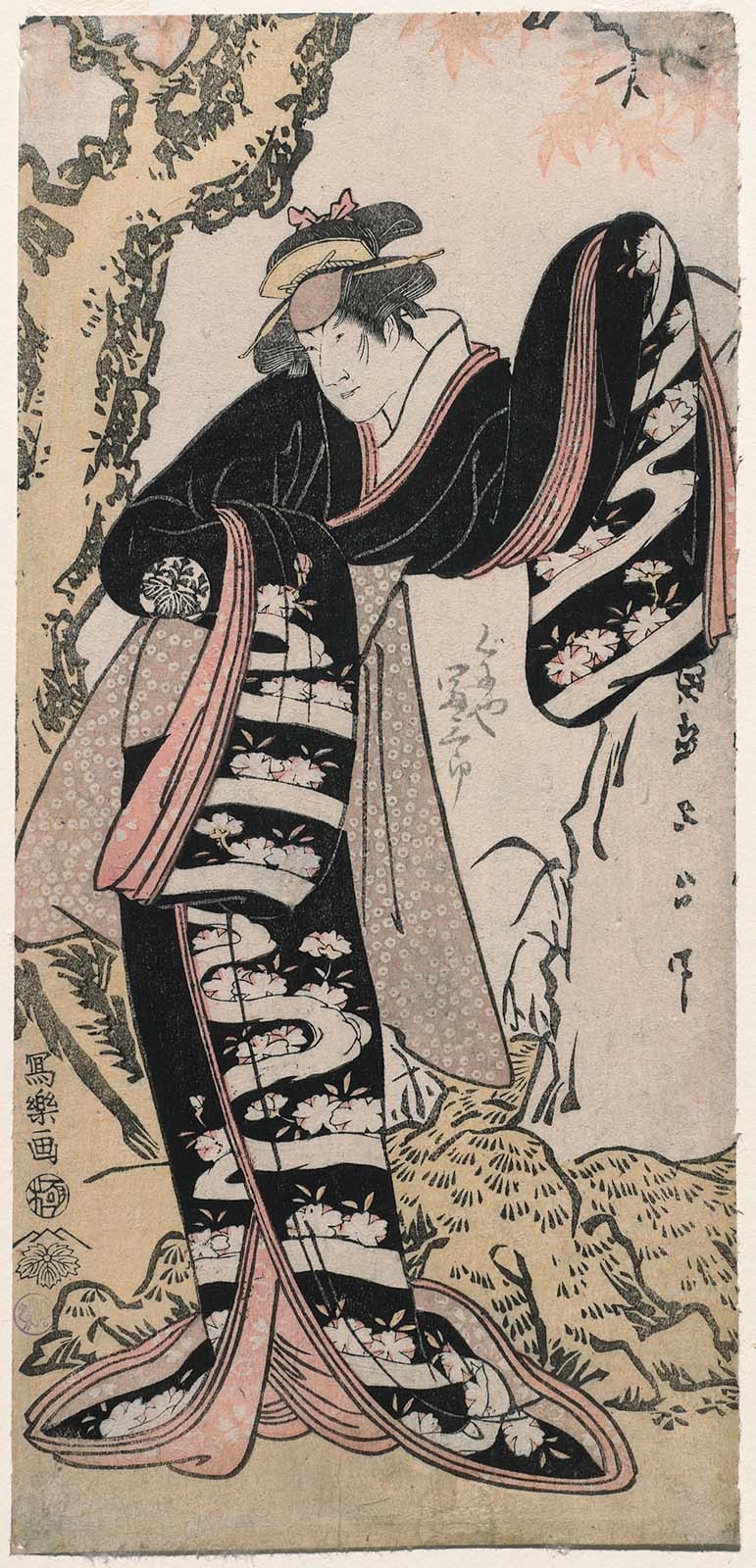

Two copies are known of the hosoban print of Nakayama Tomisaburō I as the cowherd Ofude (初世中山富三郎の牛飼いおふで Shosei Nakayama Tomisaburō no ushikai Ofude); one each are in the collections of the Museum of Fine Arts, Boston, and the Portland Art Museum.

==== Ichikawa Yaozō III as a kamuro performing a Lion Dance ====
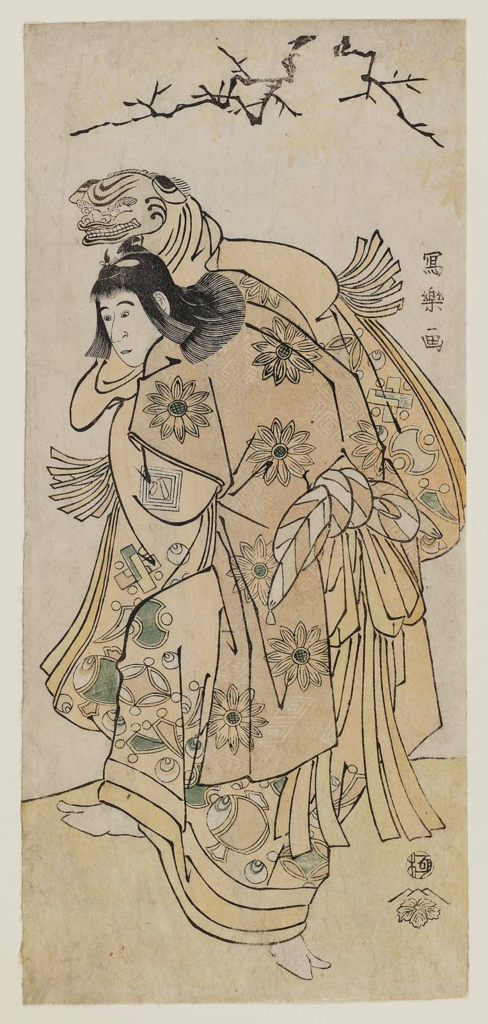

Two copies of the hosoban print of Ichikawa Yaozō III as a kamuro performing a Lion Dance are known, one in the Museum of Fine Arts, Boston, and the other in the Metropolitan Museum of Art. It forms the right half of a diptych with Nakayama Tomisaburō I as a kamuro performing a Lion Dance.

==== Nakayama Tomisaburō I as a kamuro performing a Lion Dance ====
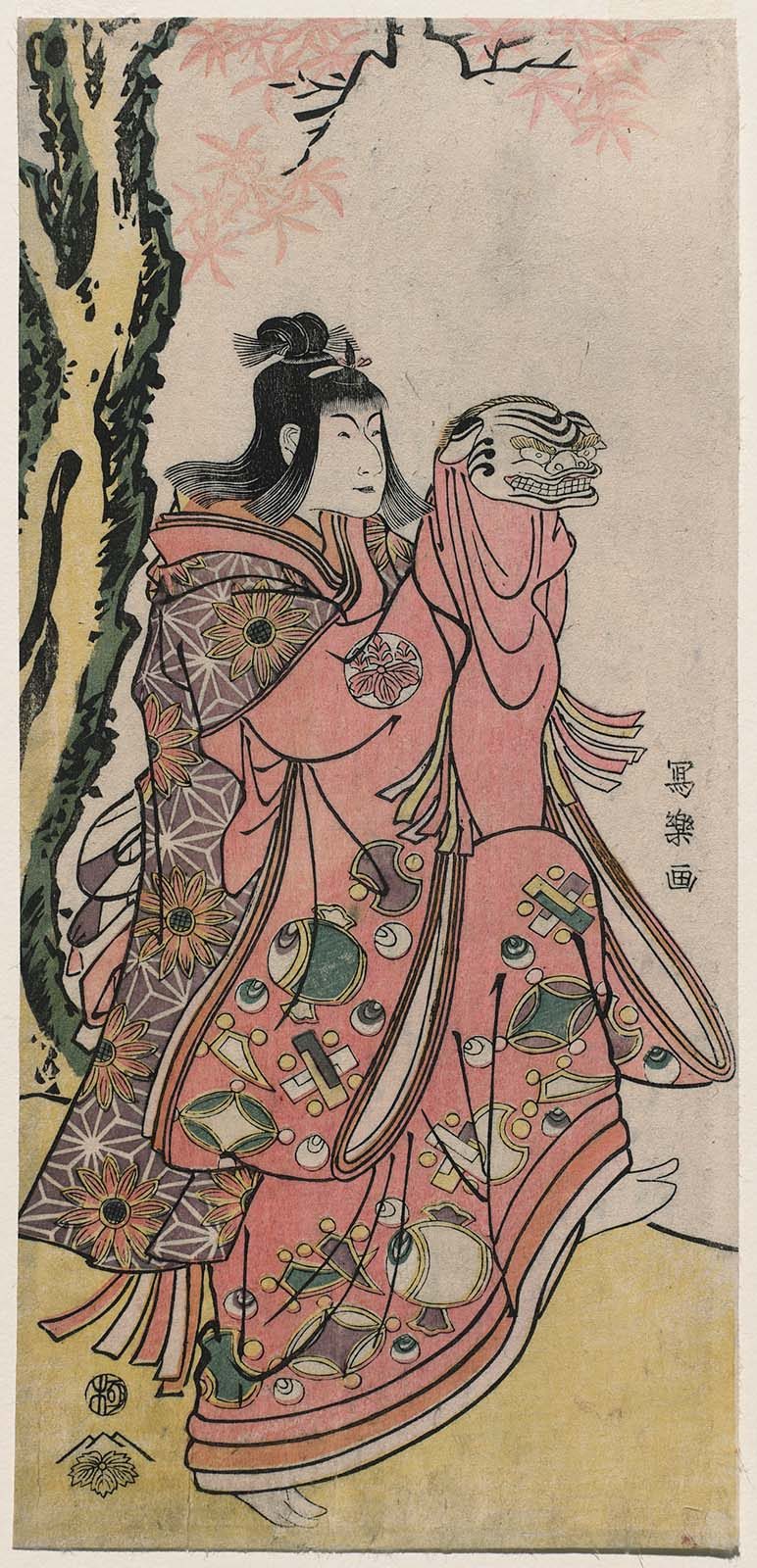

Three copies of the hosoban print of Nakayama Tomisaburō I as a kamuro performing a Lion Dance are known, two in the Museum of Fine Arts, Boston, and the other in the Metropolitan Museum of Art. It forms the left half of a diptych with Ichikawa Yaozō III as a kamuro performing a Lion Dance.

==== Ichikawa Ebizō I as the itinerant monk Ryōzan, actually Abe no Sadatō ====
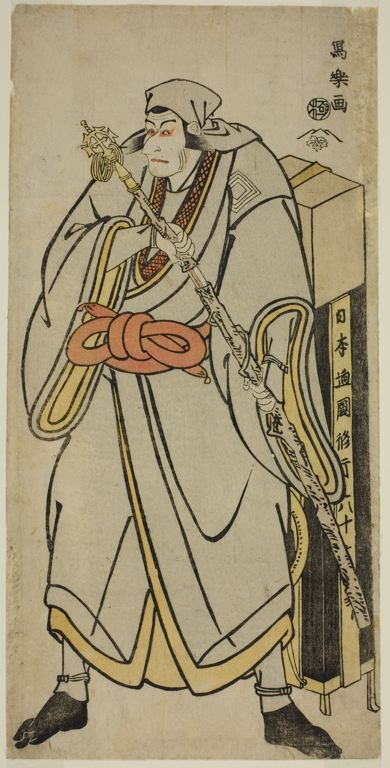

Five copies of the hosoban print of Ichikawa Ebizō I as Abe no Sadatō disguised as the itinerant monk Ryōzan are known, one each in the collections of the Tokyo National Museum, the Rijksmuseum, the Museum of Fine Arts, Boston, the Art Institute of Chicago, and in a private collection.

==== Morita Kan'ya VIII as Genkaibō Ajari ====
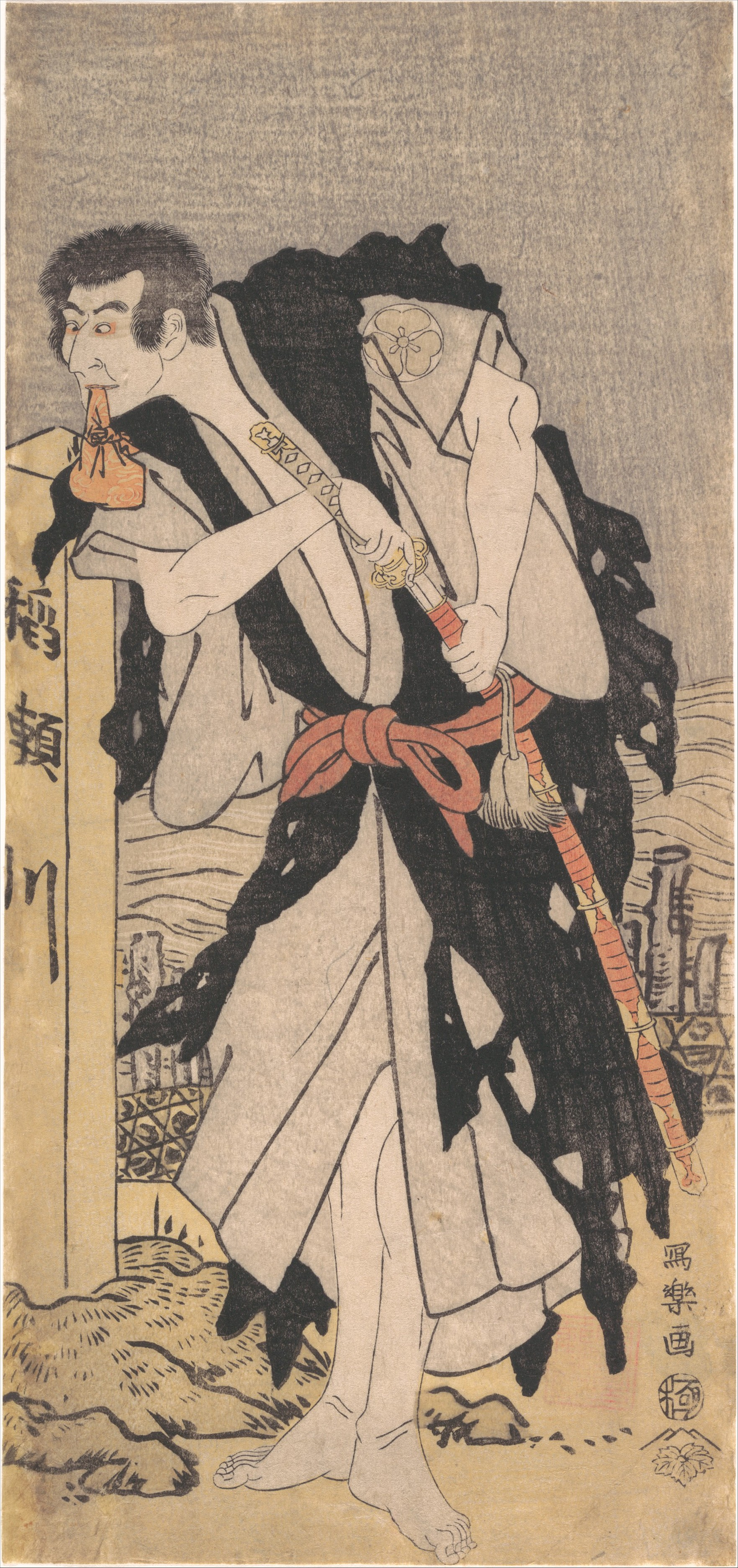

Have to figure out what's going on with this title

One copy of the hosoban print of Morita Kan'ya VIII as Genkaibō Ajari is known and is in the collection of the Metropolitan Museum of Art.

==== Nakayama Tomisaburō I as Ohisa, wife of Sazanami Tatsugorō, actually Teriha, the younger sister of Abe Sadatō (hosoban) ====
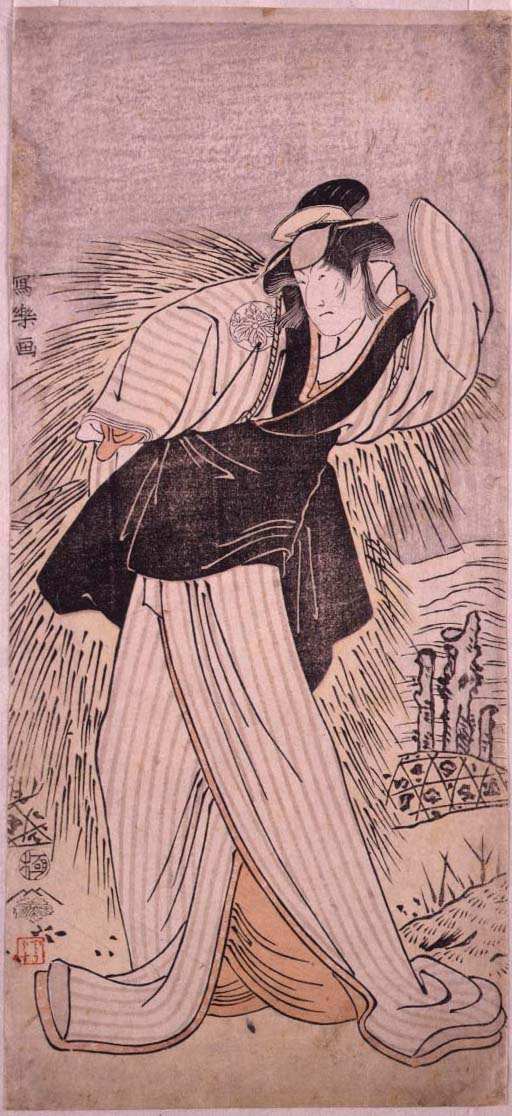

One copy is known of the hosoban print of Nakayama Tomisaburō I as Teriha, the younger sister of Sadatō, disguised as Ohisa, the wife of Sazanami Tatsugorō (初世中山富三郎のさざ波辰五郎妻おひさ実は安倍貞任妹てりは Shosei Nakayama Tomisaburō no Sazanami Tatsugorō tsuma Ohisa jitsu wa Abe Sadatō imōto Teriha); it is in the collection of the Tokyo National Museum.

==== Ichikawa Yaozō III as Hachiman Tarō Minamoto no Yoshiie ====
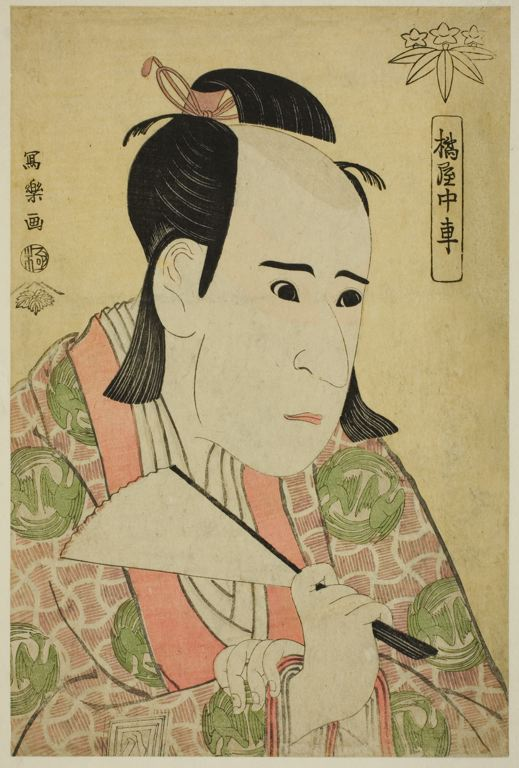

double check this

Two copies are known of the aiban print of Ichikawa Yaozō III as Hachiman Tarō Minamoto no Yoshiie, one each in the collections of the Tokyo National Museum and the Art Institute of Chicago.

==== Ichikawa Danjūrō VI as Arakawa Tarō Takesada ====
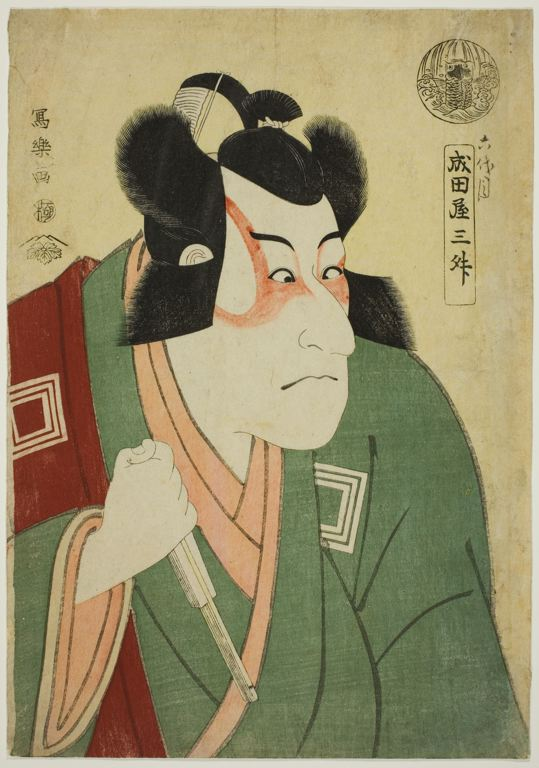

Three copies are known of the aiban print of Ichikawa Danjūrō VI as Arakawa Tarō Takesada (六世市川団十郎の荒川太郎武貞 Roku-sei Ichikawa Danjūrō VI no Arakawa Tarō Takesada); they are in the collections of the Tokyo National Museum, the Art Institute of Chicago, and the Museum für Kunst und Gewerbe Hamburg.

==== Nakayama Tomisaburō I as Ohisa, wife of Sazanami Tatsugorō, actually Teriha, the younger sister of Sadatō (aiban) ====
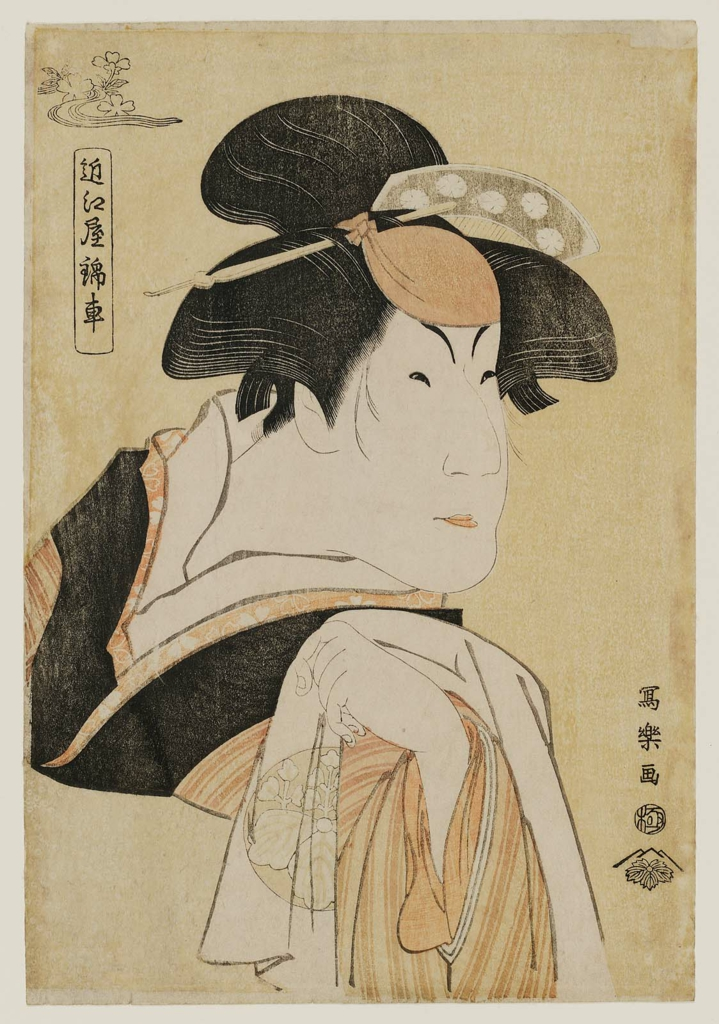

Three copies are known of the aiban print of Nakayama Tomisaburō I as Teriha, the younger sister of Sadatō, disguised as Ohisa, the wife of Sazanami Tatsugorō (初世中山富三郎のさざ波辰五郎妻おひさ実は安倍貞任妹てりは Shosei Nakayama Tomisaburō no Sazanami Tatsugorō tsuma Ohisa jitsu wa Abe Sadatō imōto Teriha); one each are in the collections of the Tokyo National Museum, the Museum of Fine Arts, Boston, and the Art Institute of Chicago.

==== Ichikawa Ebizō I as Kamakura Gondayū, actually Abe no Sadatō ====
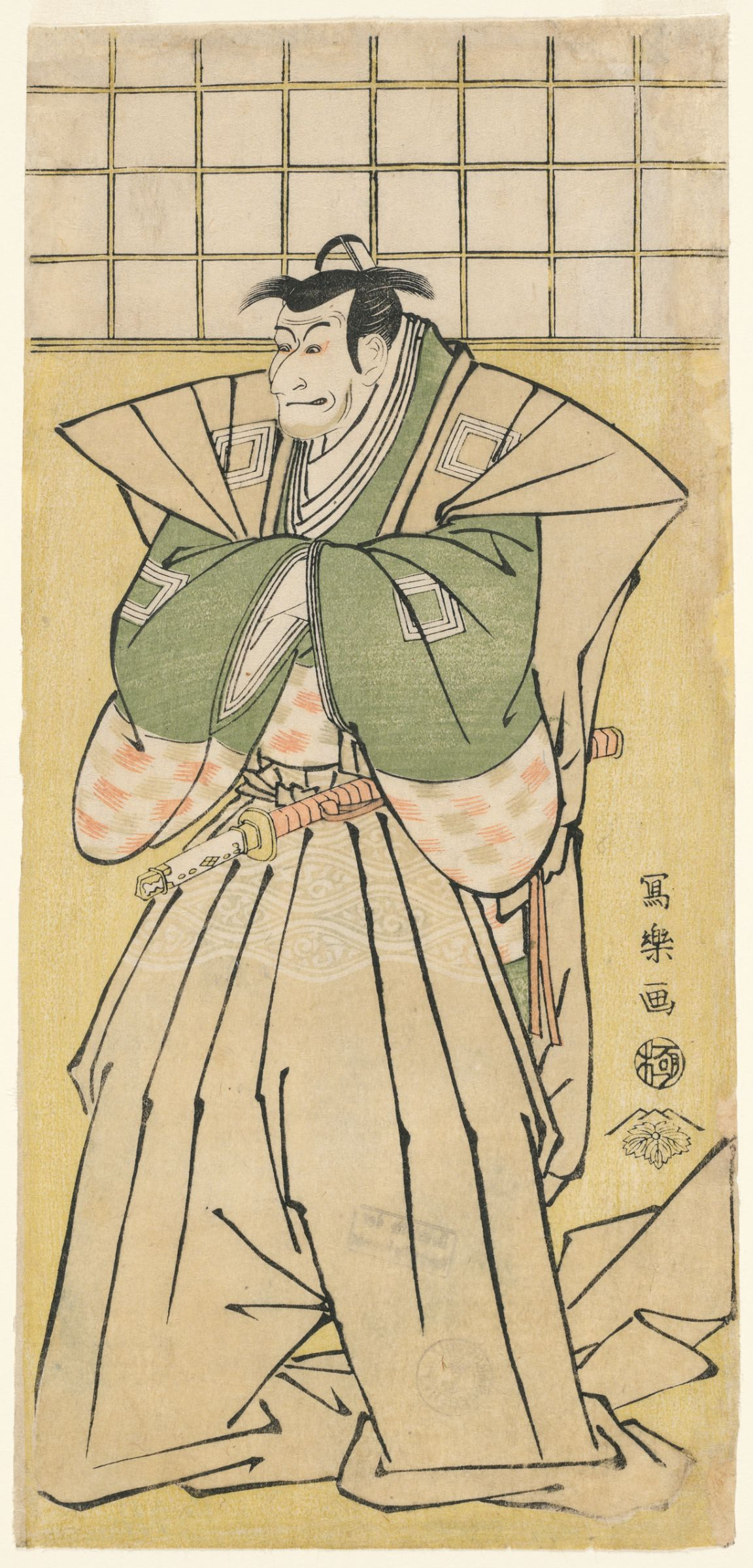

One copy is known of the hosoban print of Ichikawa Ebizō I as Abe no Sadatō disguised as Kamakura Gondayū (初世市川鰕蔵の鎌倉権太夫景成実は安倍貞任 Shosei Ichikawa Ebizō no Kamakura Gondayū jitsu wa Abe no Sadatō); it is in the collection of the Harvard Arthur M. Sackler Museum.

==== Ichikawa Yaozō III as Hachiman Tarō Yoshiie ====
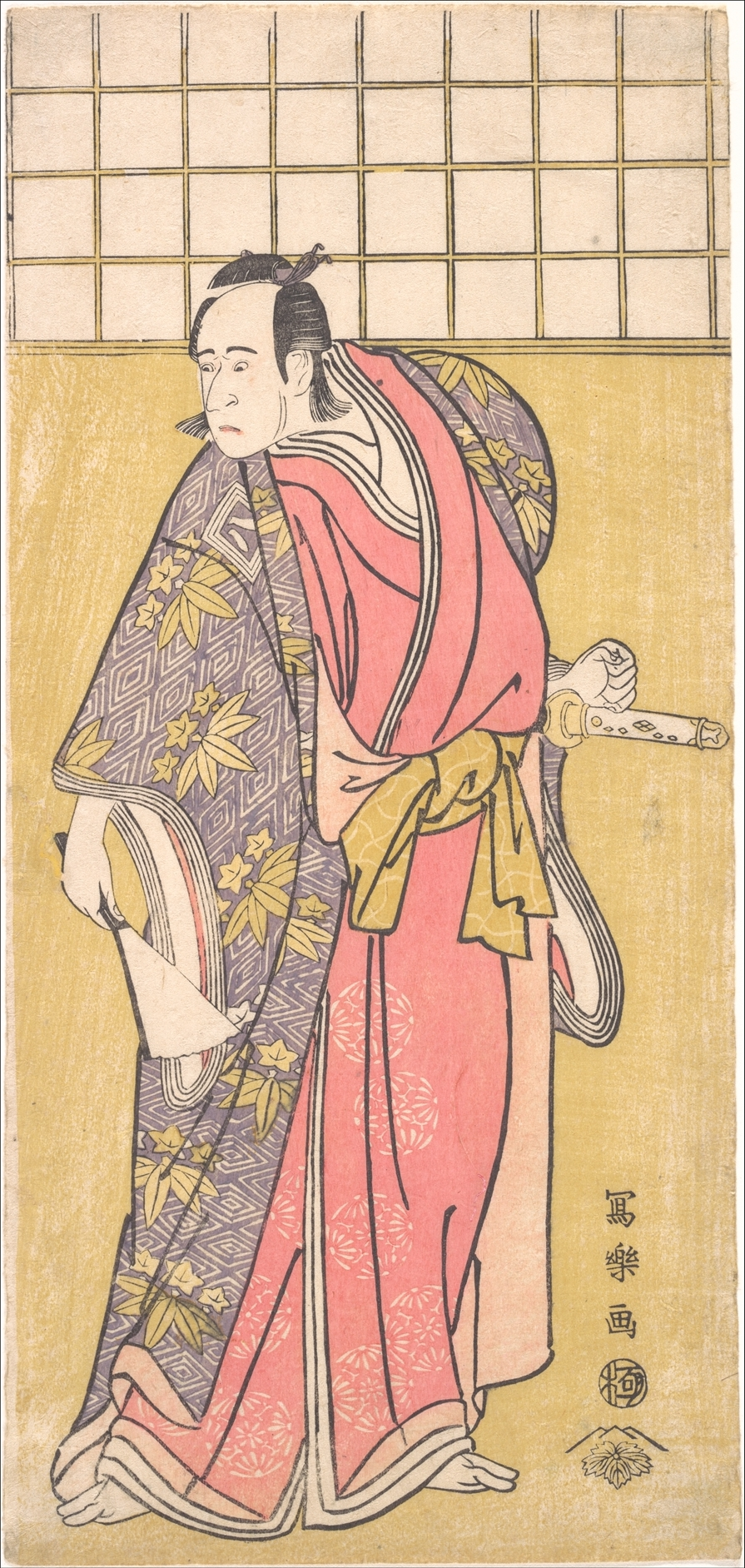

One copy is known of the hosoban print of Ichikawa Yaozō III as Hachiman Tarō Yoshiie (三世市川八百蔵の八幡太郎義家 Sansei Ichikawa Yaozō no Hachiman Tarō Yoshiie); it is in the collection of the Metropolitan Museum of Art.

=== Otokoyama Oedo no Ishizue Niban-me ===
Otokoyama Oedo no Ishizue Niban-me (男山御江戸盤石二番目) débuted at the Kiri-za in the 11th month of the 6th year of Gansei.

==== Yamashita Kinsaku II as the maid Ebizō Okane, actually Iwate Gozen, wife of Abe Sadatō (Tennōjiya Rikō) ====
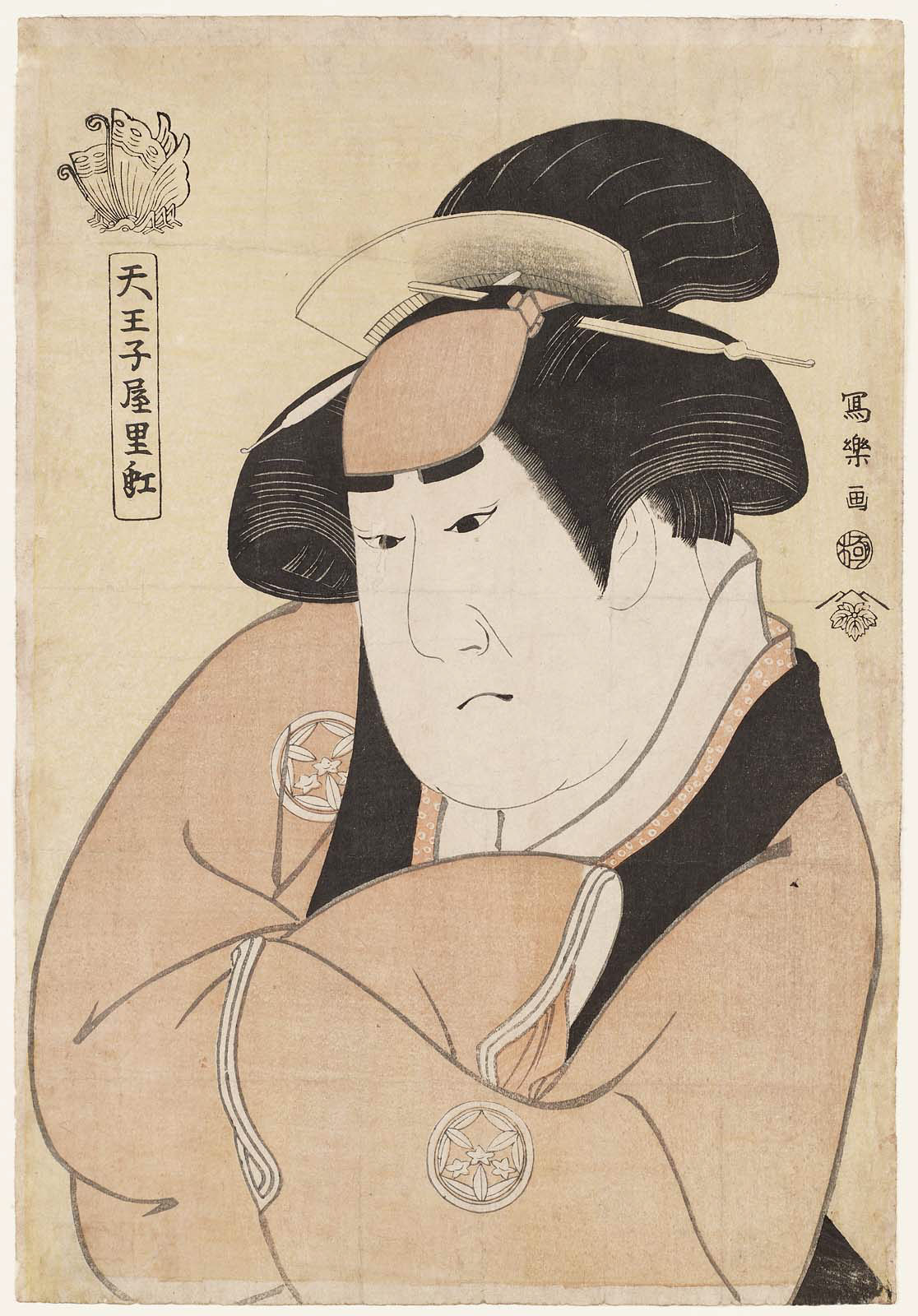

Seven copies are known of the aiban print of Yamashita Kinsaku II as Abe Sadatō's wife Iwate Gozen disguised as the maid Ebizō Okane (Tennōjiya Rikō) (二世山下金作の仲居 おかね実は安倍貞任妻岩手御前（天王子屋里虹） (Note: Also 天王寺屋里虹) Nisei Yamashita Kinsaku no nakai Okane jitsu wa Abe Sadatō tsuma Iwate Gozen) known; one each are in the collections of the Tokyo National Museum, the Japan Ukiyo-e Museum, the British Museum, the Art Institute of Chicago, and the Philadelphia Museum of Art, and two in the Museum of Fine Arts, Boston.

==== Ichikawa Yaozō III as Saeki Kurando Tsunenori ====
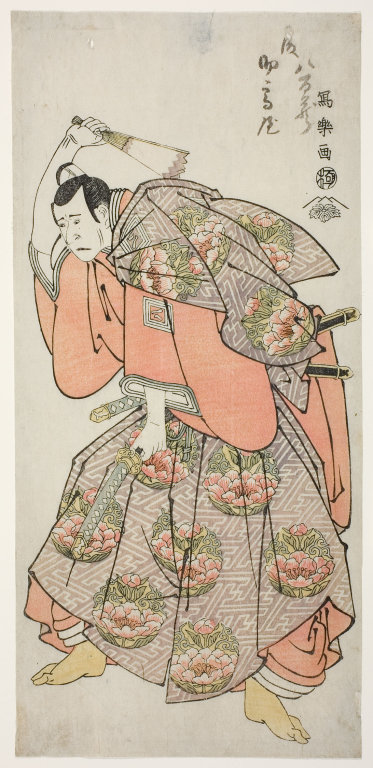

One copy is known of the hosoban print of Ichikawa Yaozō III as Saeki Kurando Tsunenori (三世市川八百蔵の佐伯蔵人経のり Sansei Ichikawa Yaozō no Saeki Kurando Tsunenori) and is in the collection of the Art Institute of Chicago.

==== Yamashita Kinsaku II as the maid Ebizō Okane, actually Iwate Gozen, wife of Abe Sadatō (plum-tree background) ====
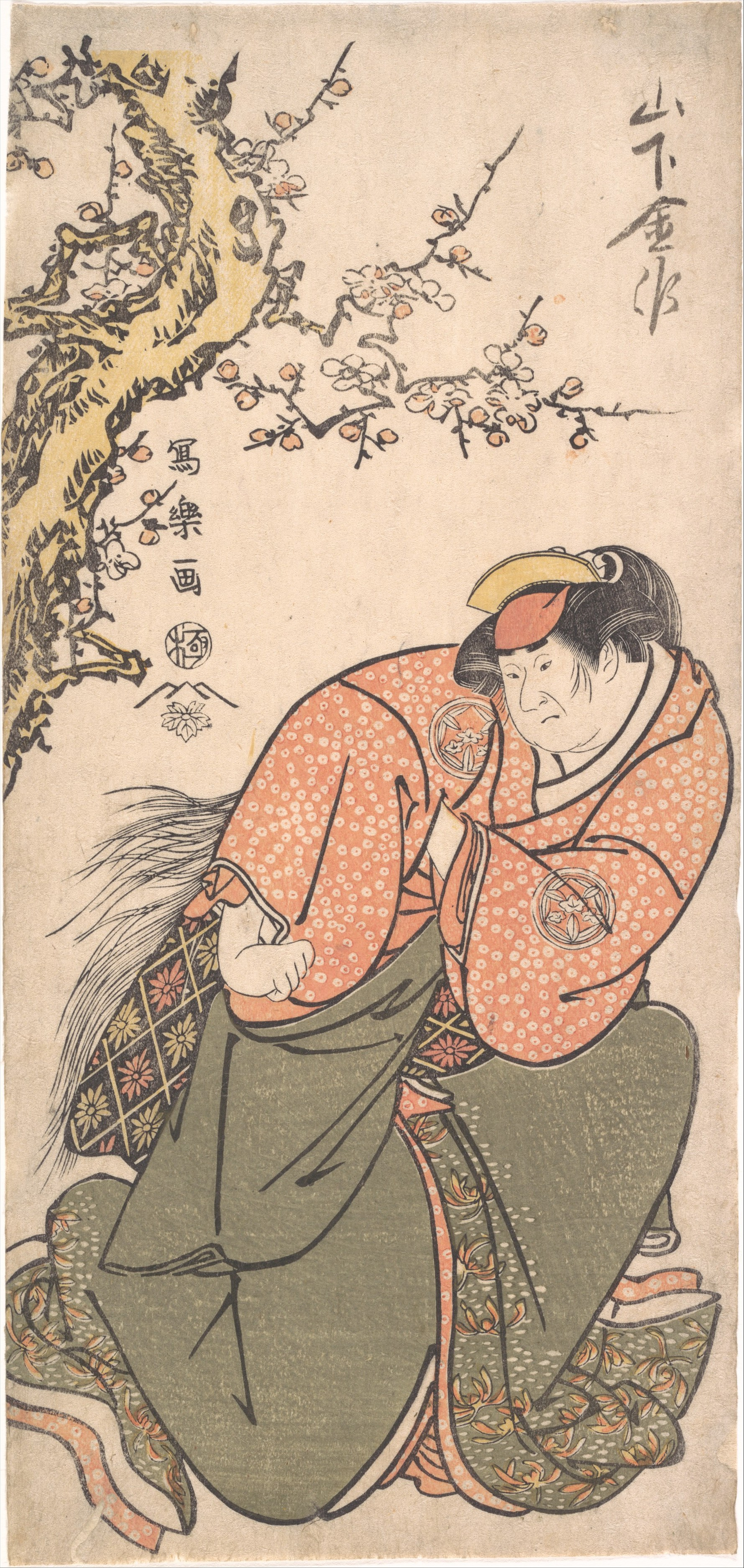

Two copies are known of the hosoban print of Yamashita Kinsaku II as Abe Sadatō's wife Iwate Gozen disguised as the maid Ebizō Okane (plum-tree background) (二世山下金作の仲居おかね実は安倍貞任妻岩手御前（背景に梅） Nisei Yamashita Kinsaku no nakai Okane jitsu wa Abe Sadatō tsuma Iwate Gozen (haikei ni ume)); one each are in the collections of M. Walter Anstutz and the Metropolitan Museum of Art.

==== Yamashita Kinsaku II as Iwate Gozen, wife of Abe Sadatō (holding an umbrella) ====
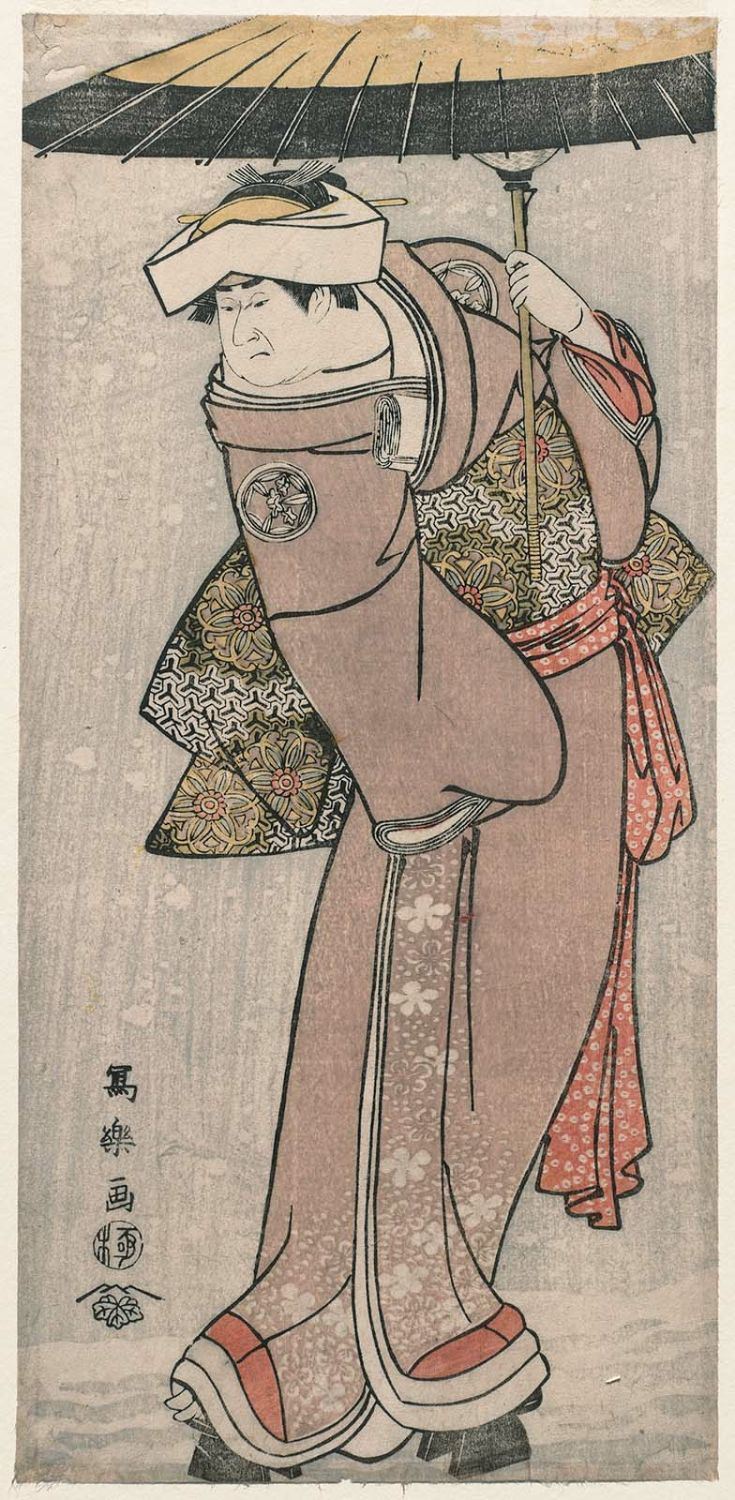

Two copies are known of the hosoban print of Yamashita Kinsaku II as Iwate Gozen, wife of Abe Sadatō, holding an umbrella (二世山下金作の安倍貞任妻岩手御前（手に傘） Nisei Yamashita Kinsaku no Abe Sadatō tsuma Iwate Gozen (te ni kasa)); one each are in the collections of the Hiraki Ukiyo-e Foundation and the Museum of Fine Arts, Boston.

==== Sakata Hangorō III as the groom Abumizuri no Iwazō in Koriyama, actually Kurisaka Tarō Tomonori ====
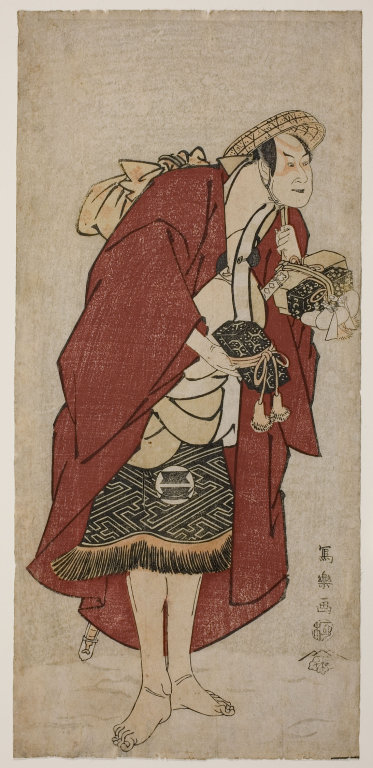

One copy is known of the hosoban print of Sakata Hangorō III as Kurisaka Tarō Tomonori disguised as the groom Abumizuri no Iwazō in Koriyama (三代目坂田半五郎の郡山の馬士あぶみずりの岩蔵実は栗坂太郎友則 Sansei Sakata Hangorō no Koriyama no bashi Abumizuri no Iwazō, jitsu wa Kurisaka Tarō Tomonori) and is in the collection of the Art Institute of Chicago.

=== Matsu wa Misao Onna Kusunoki ===
Matsu wa Misao Onna Kusunoki (松貞婦女楠, "Steadfast as the pine tree is the woman of the Kusanoki clan") débuted at the Kawarazaki-za in the 11th month of the 6th year of Gansei.

==== Onoe Matsusuke I as Ashikaga Takauji ====
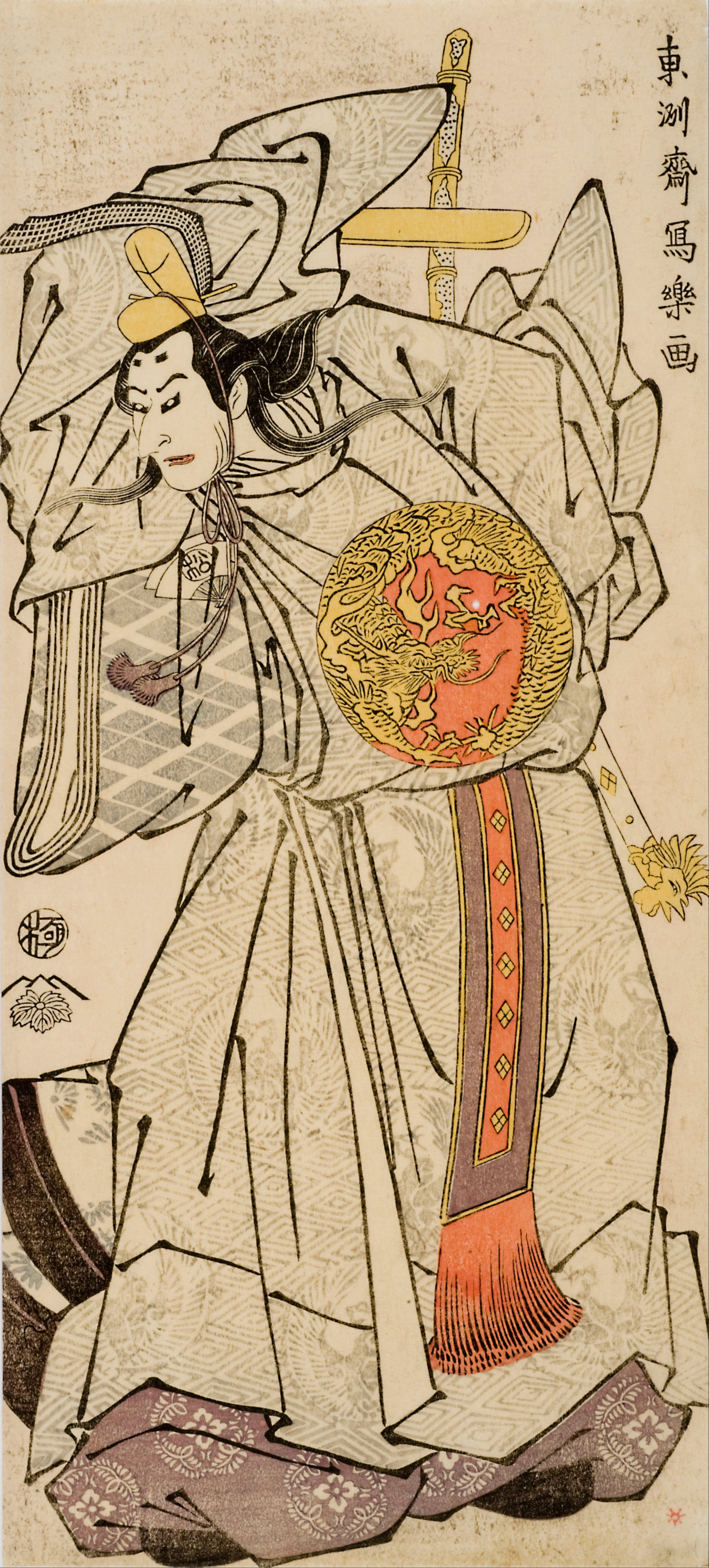

One copy is known of the hosoban print of Onoe Matsusuke I as Ashikaga Takauji (初世尾上松助の足利尊氏 Shosei Onoe Matsusuke no Ashikaga Takauji); it is in the Toledo Museum of Art.

==== Ichikawa Komazō III as Shinozuka Gorō (Sadatsuna) ====
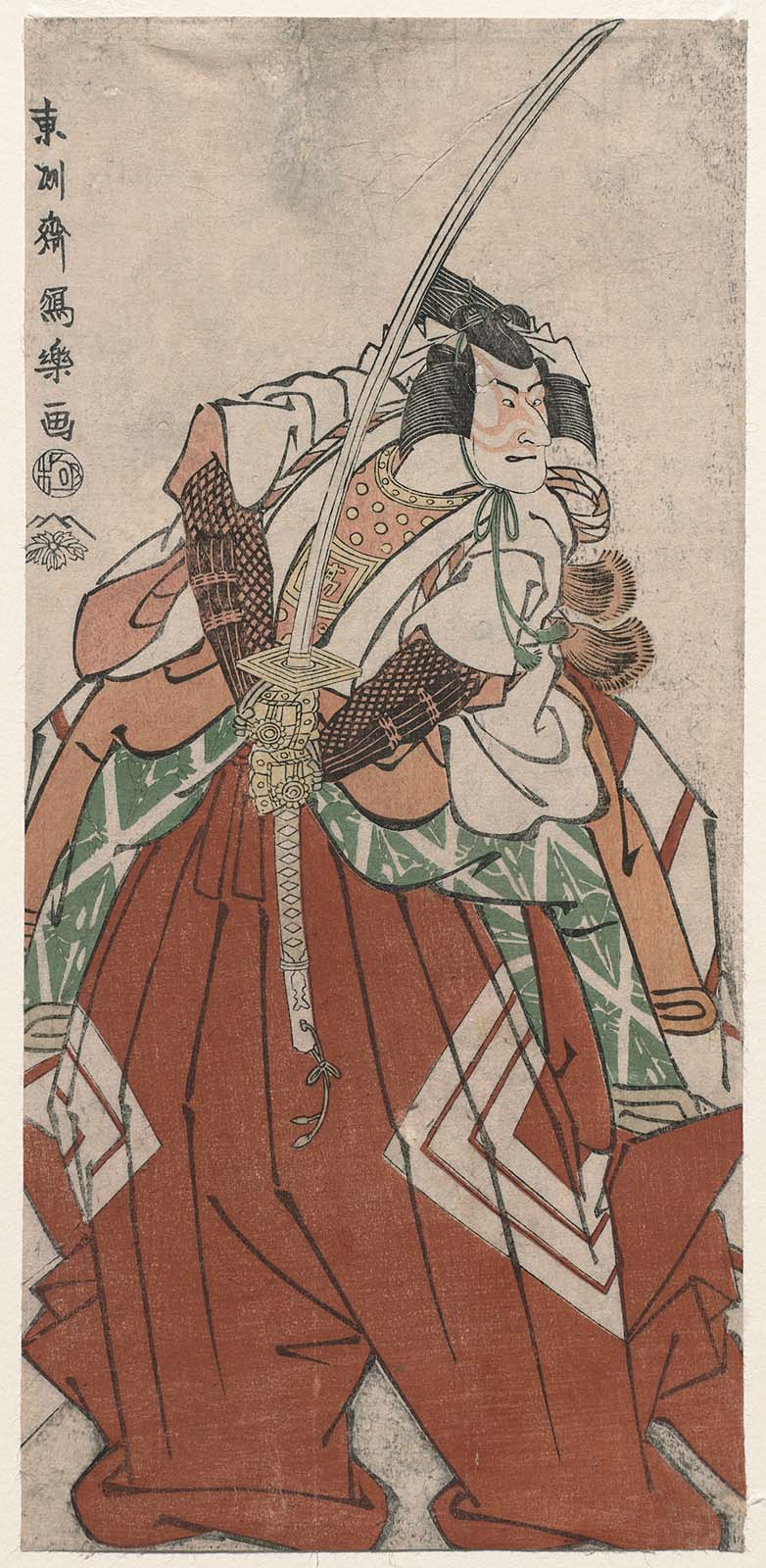

Three copies are known of the hosoban print of Ichikawa Komazō III as Shinozuka Gorō (Sadatsuna) (三世市川高麗蔵の篠塚五郎（貞綱） Sansei Ichikawa Komazō no Shinozuka Gorō (Sadatsuna)); one each are in the collections of the Museum of Fine Arts, Boston, the Minneapolis Institute of Art, and another in a private collection.

==== Iwai Hanshirō IV as Kōtō no Naishi ====
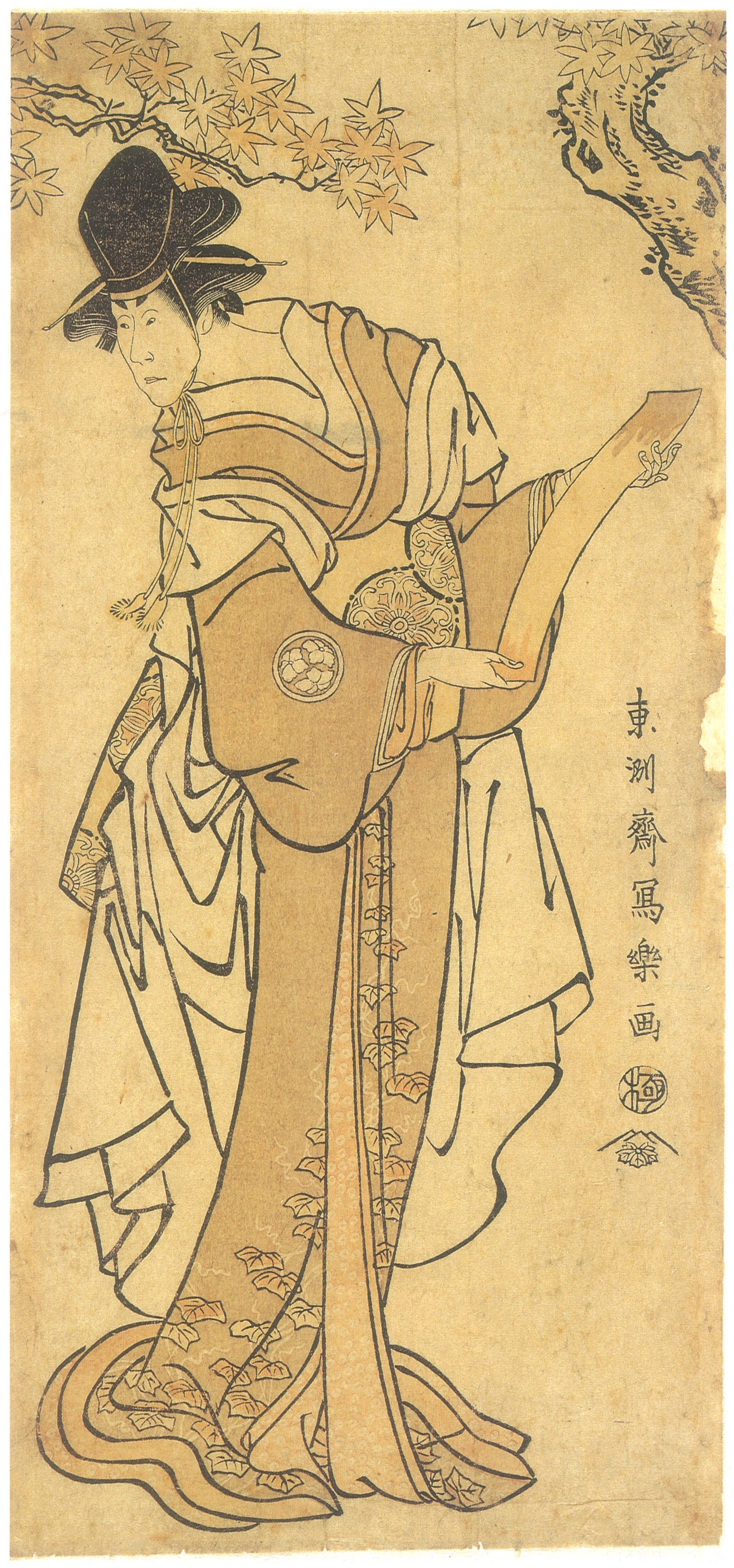

Three copies are known of the hosoban print of Iwai Hanshirō IV as Kōtō no Naishi (四世岩井喜代太郎の先帝の上わらは勾当内侍 Yonsei Iwai Hanshirō no Sentei no ue-warawa Kōtō no Naishi); one each are in the collections of the Tokyo National Museum and the Museum of Fine Arts, Boston, and another is in a private collection.

The print was earlier believed to have been of Osagawa Tsuneyo II as Kojima, the wife of Bingo Saburō (二世小佐川常世の備後三郎妻児島 Nisei Osagawa Tsuneyono Bingo Saburō tsuma Kojima).

==== Ichikawa Komazō III as Nitta Yoshisada, actually Oyamada Tarō Takaie ====
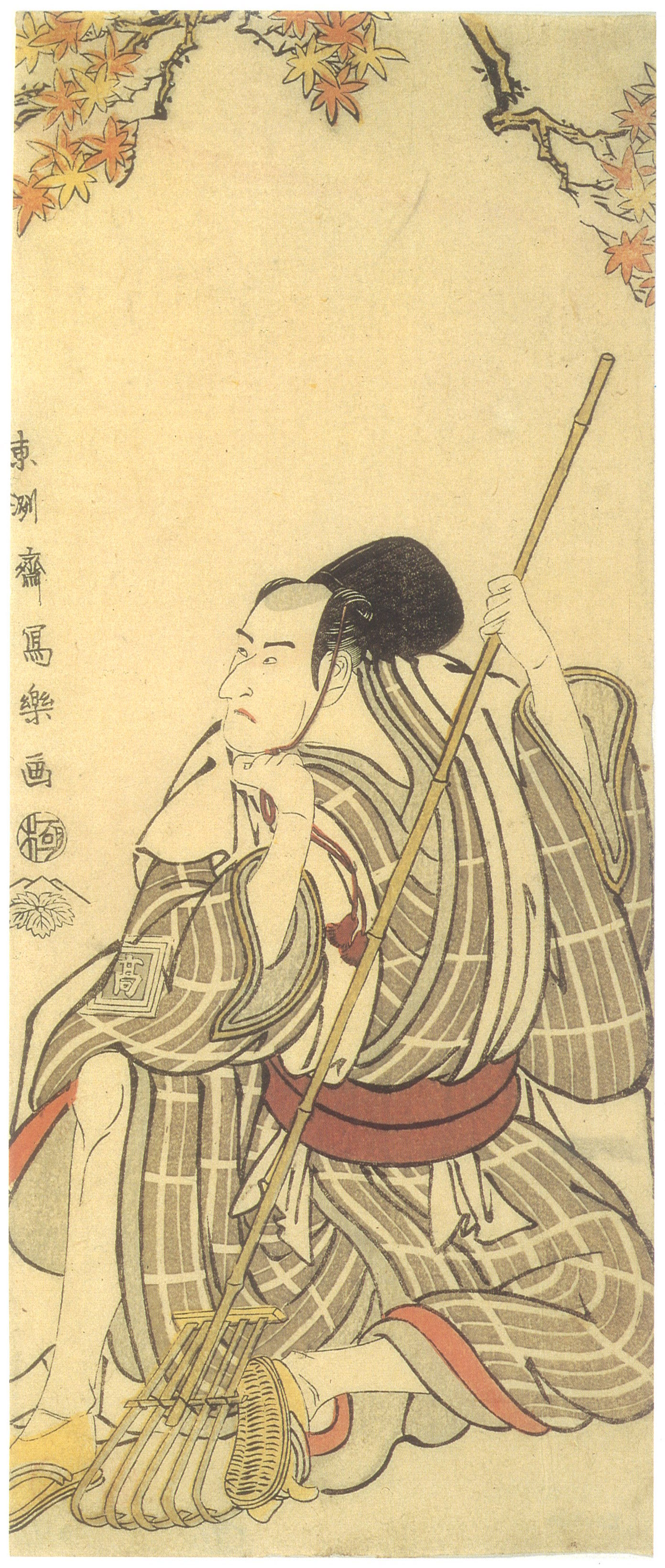

Two copies are known of the hosoban print of Ichikawa Komazō III as Oyamada Tarō Takaie disguised as Nitta Yoshisada (三世市川高麗蔵の新田義貞実は小山田太郎高家 Sansei Ichikawa Komazō no Nitta Yoshisada jitsu wa Oyamada Tarō Takaie); one is in the collection of the Hagi Uragami Museum and the other in a private collection.

==== Iwai Hanshirō IV as Chihaya, the younger sister of the Shintō priest Kenkō ====
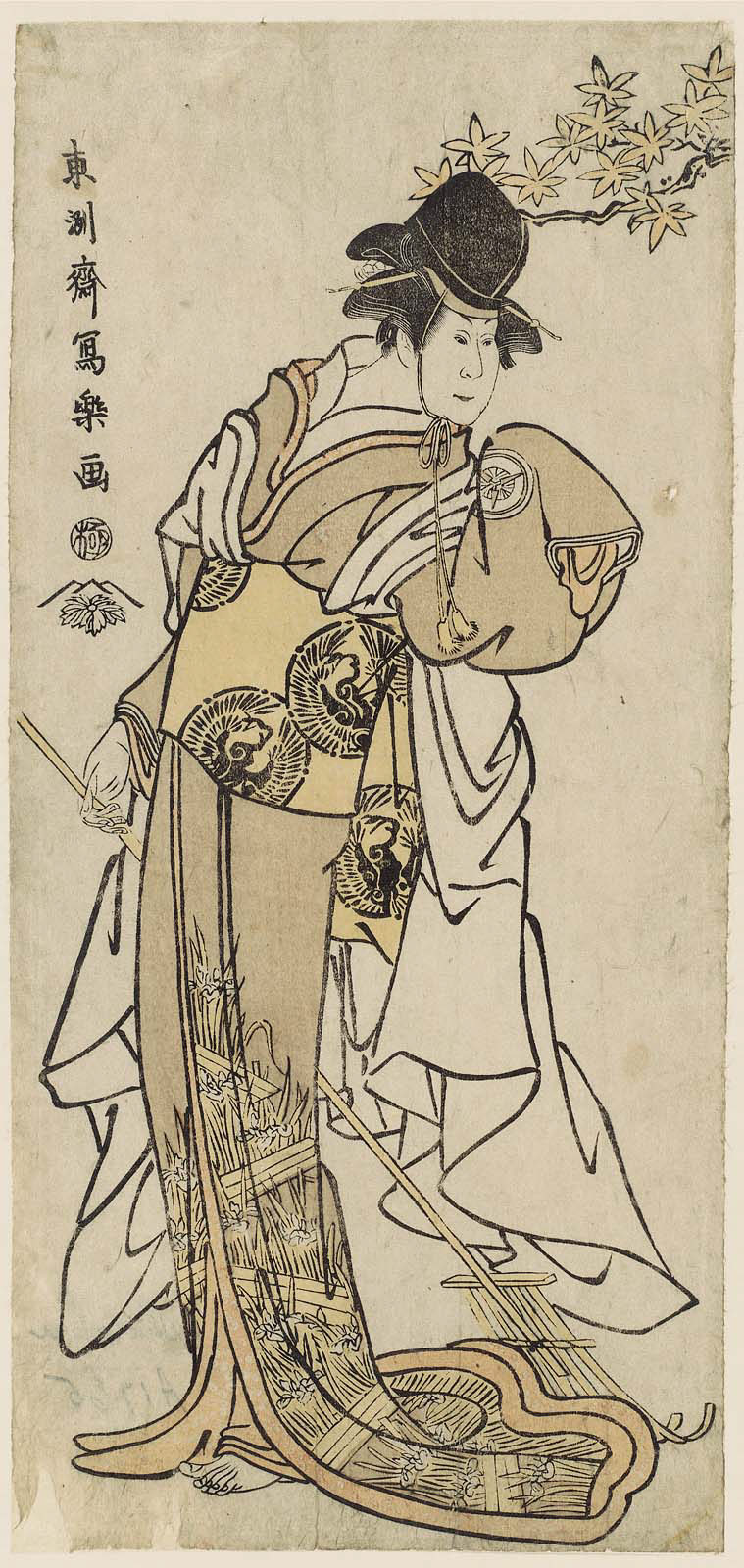

Three copies are known of the hosoban print of Iwai Hanshirō IV as Chihaya, the younger sister of the Shintō priest Kenkō (四世岩井半四郎の神祇官兼好が妹千はや Iwai Hanshirō no shingikan Kenkō ga imōto Chihaya); one each are in the collections of the Museum of Fine Arts, Boston, and the New York Public Library, and another is in a private collection.

==== Iwai Hanshirō IV as the pilgrim O-Toma, daughter of O-Hina from Inamuragasaki in Kamakura ====
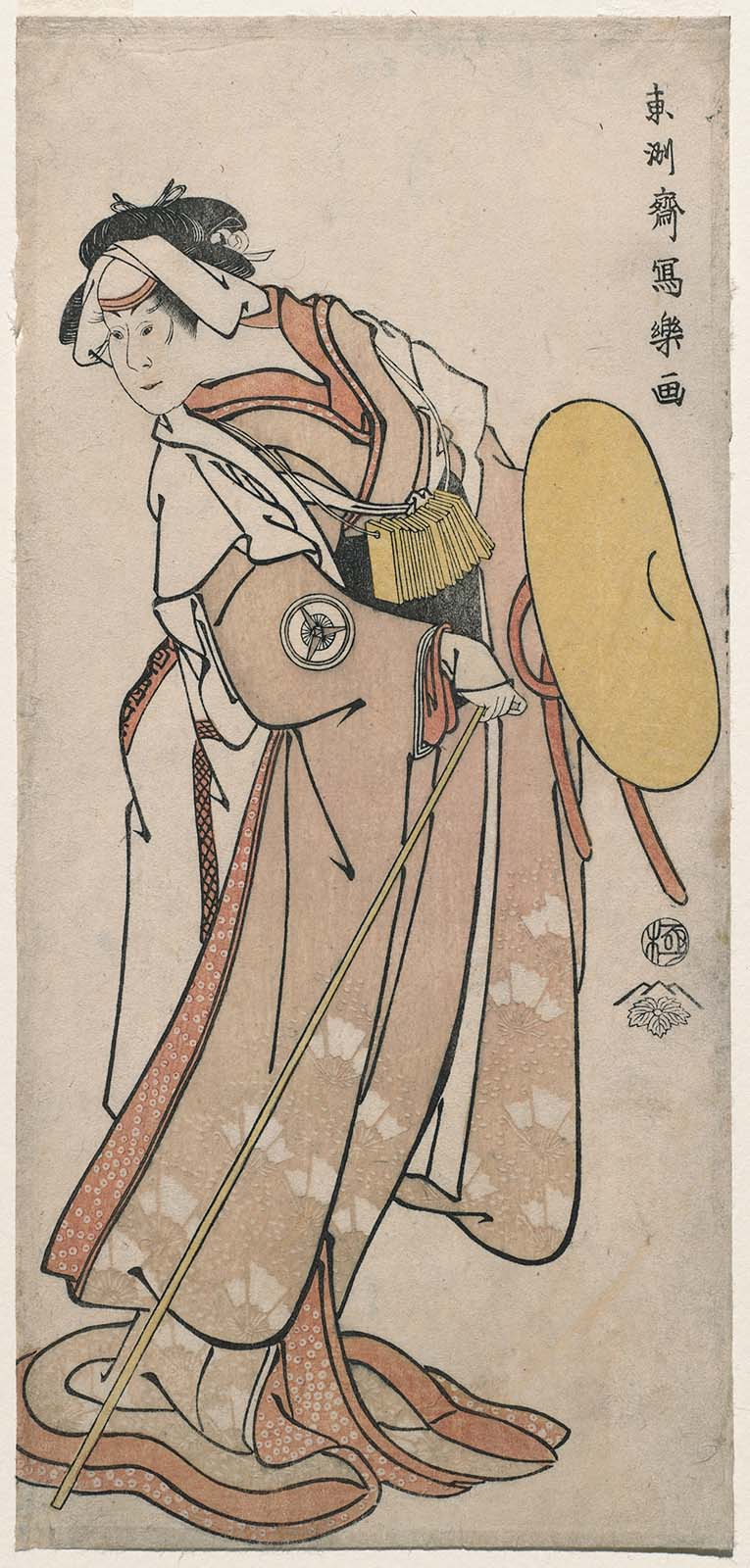

Three copies known of the hosoban print of Iwai Hanshirō IV as the pilgrim O-Toma, daughter of O-Hina from Inamuragasaki in Kamakura 四世岩井半四郎の鎌倉稲村が崎のおひな娘おとま（巡礼姿） Yonsei Iwai Hanshirō Kamakura no Inamuragasaki no O-Hina musume O-Toma (junrei sugata)); one each is in the collections of the Tokyo National Museum, the Museum of Fine Arts, Boston, and the Art Institute of Chicago.

==== Onoe Matsusuke I as the lay priest Yuasa Magoroku ====
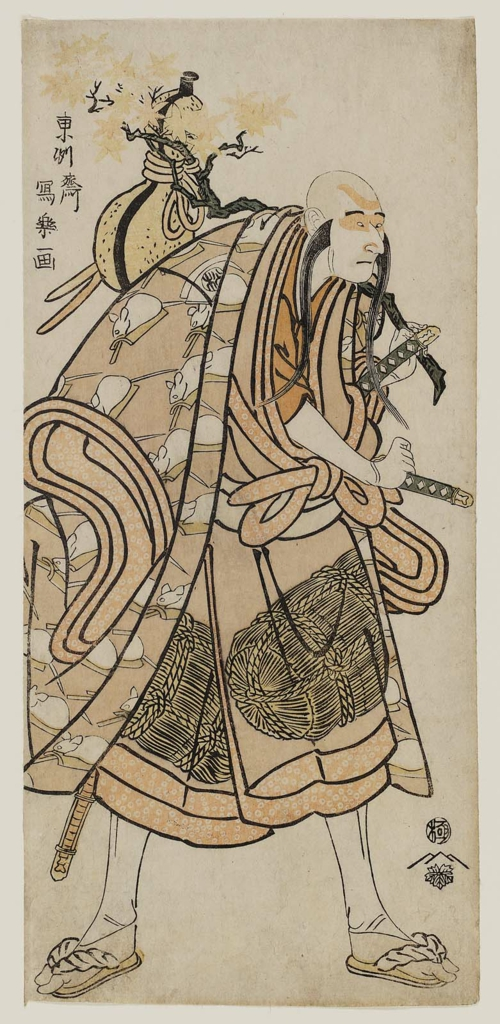

One copy is known of the hosoban print of Onoe Matsusuke I as the lay priest Yuasa Magoroku (初世尾上松助の湯浅孫六入道 Shosei Onoe Matsusuke no Yuasa Magoroku nyūdō); it is in the collection of the Museum of Fine Arts, Boston.

==== Ichikawa Komazō III as the monk Saihō no Mida Jirō, actually Sagami Jirō Tokiyuki ====
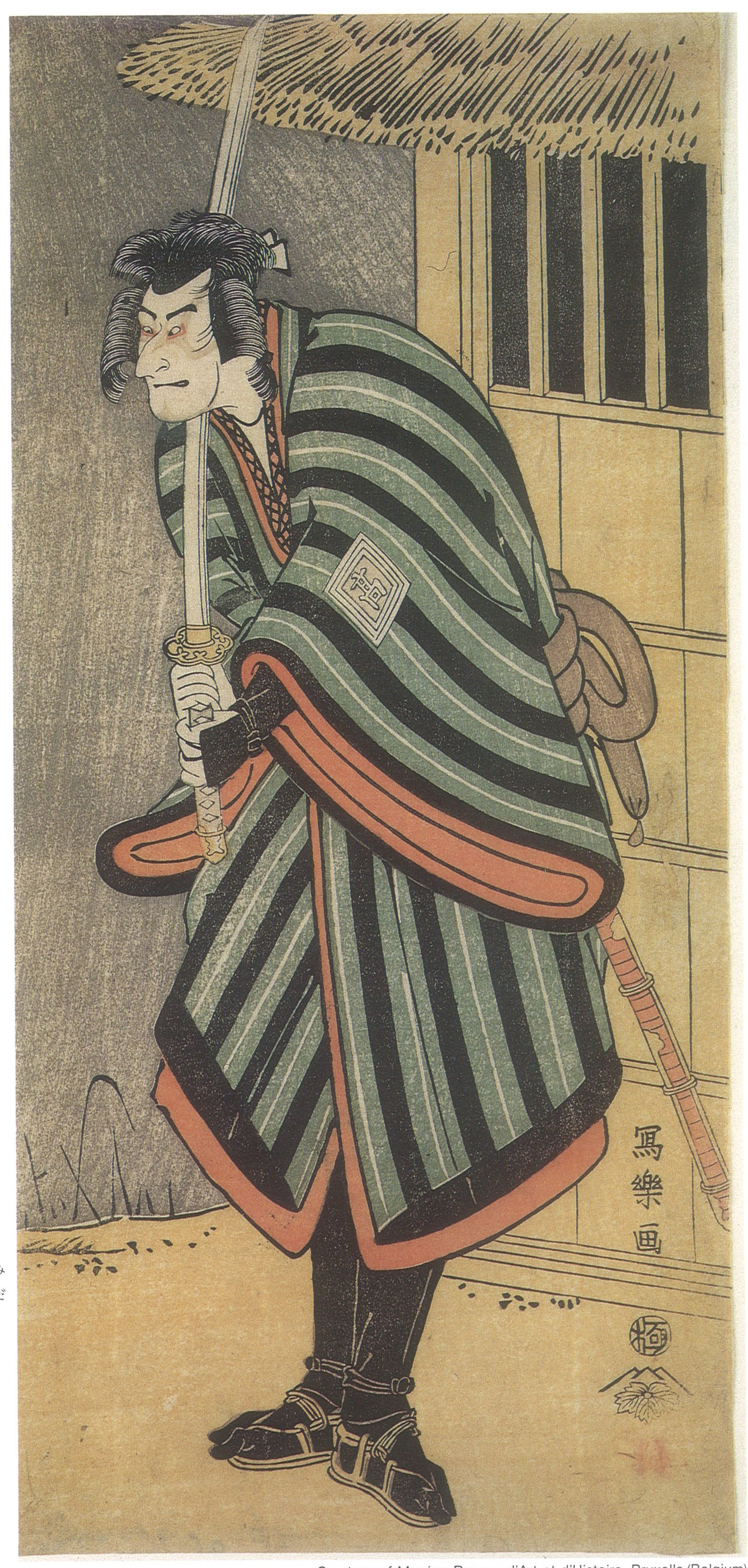

One copy of the hosoban print of Ichikawa Komazō III as the monk Saihō no Mida Jirō, actually Sagami Jirō Tokiyuki (三世市川高麗蔵の廻国の修行者西方の弥陀次郎実は相模次郎時行 Sansei Ichikawa Komazō no kaikoku no shūgyōsha Saihō no Mida Jirō jitsu wa Sagami Jirō Tokiyuki); it is in the collection of the Royal Museums of Art and History.

==== Iwai Hanshirō IV as O-Toma, Daughter of O-Hina from Inamuragasaki in Kamakura, actually Kikusui, the wife of Kusunoki Masashige ====
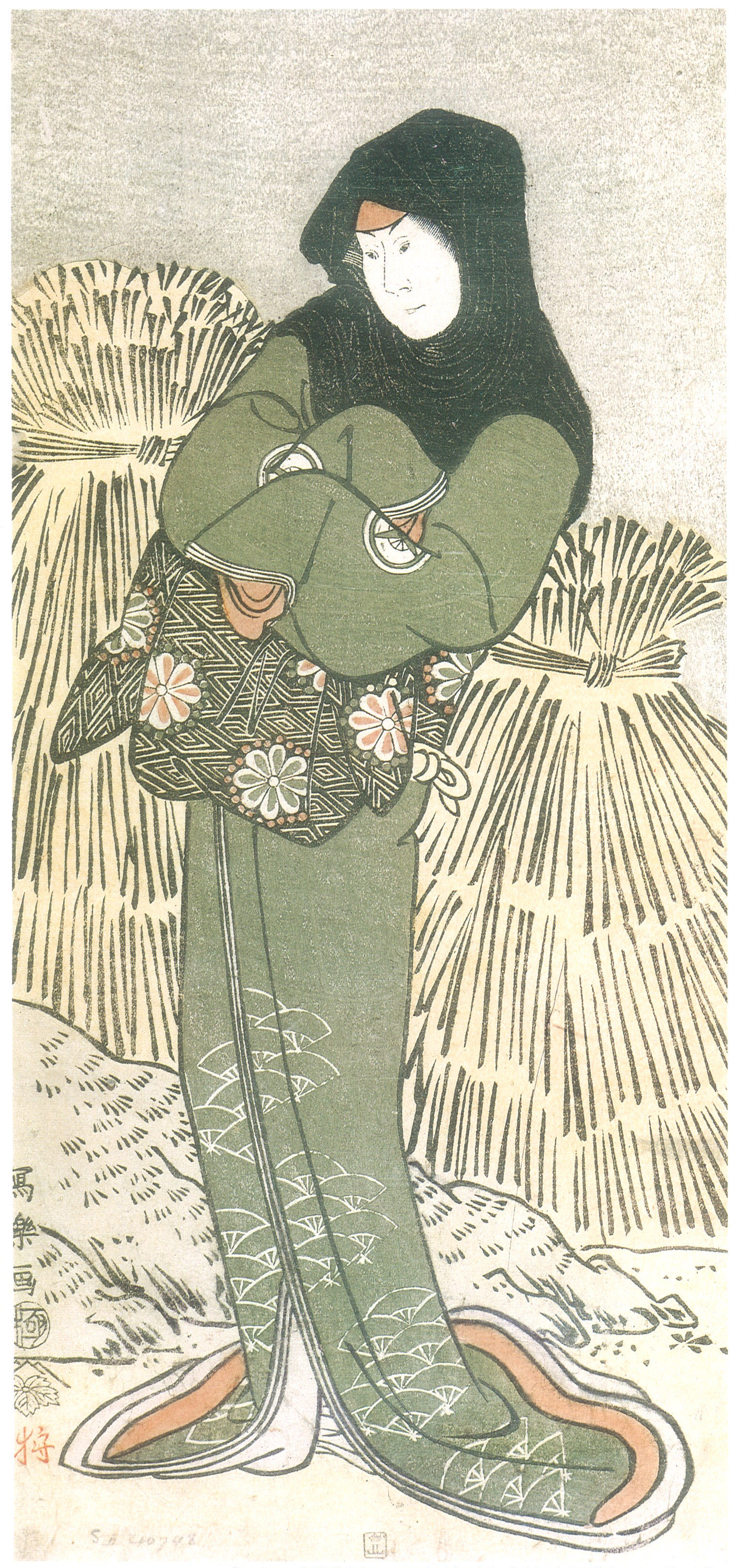

One copy is known of the hosoban print of Iwai Hanshirō IV as Kusunoki Masashige's wife Kikusui disguised as O-Hina's daughter O-Toma from Inamuragasaki in Kamakura (四世岩井半四郎の鎌倉稲村が崎のおひな娘おとま実は楠政成妻菊水 Iwai Hanshirō Kamakura no Inamuragasaki no O-Hina musume O-Toma, jitsu wa Kusunoki Masashige tsuma Kikusui); it is in the collection of the Royal Library of Belgium.

=== Matsu ha Misao Onna Kusunoki Niban-me ===
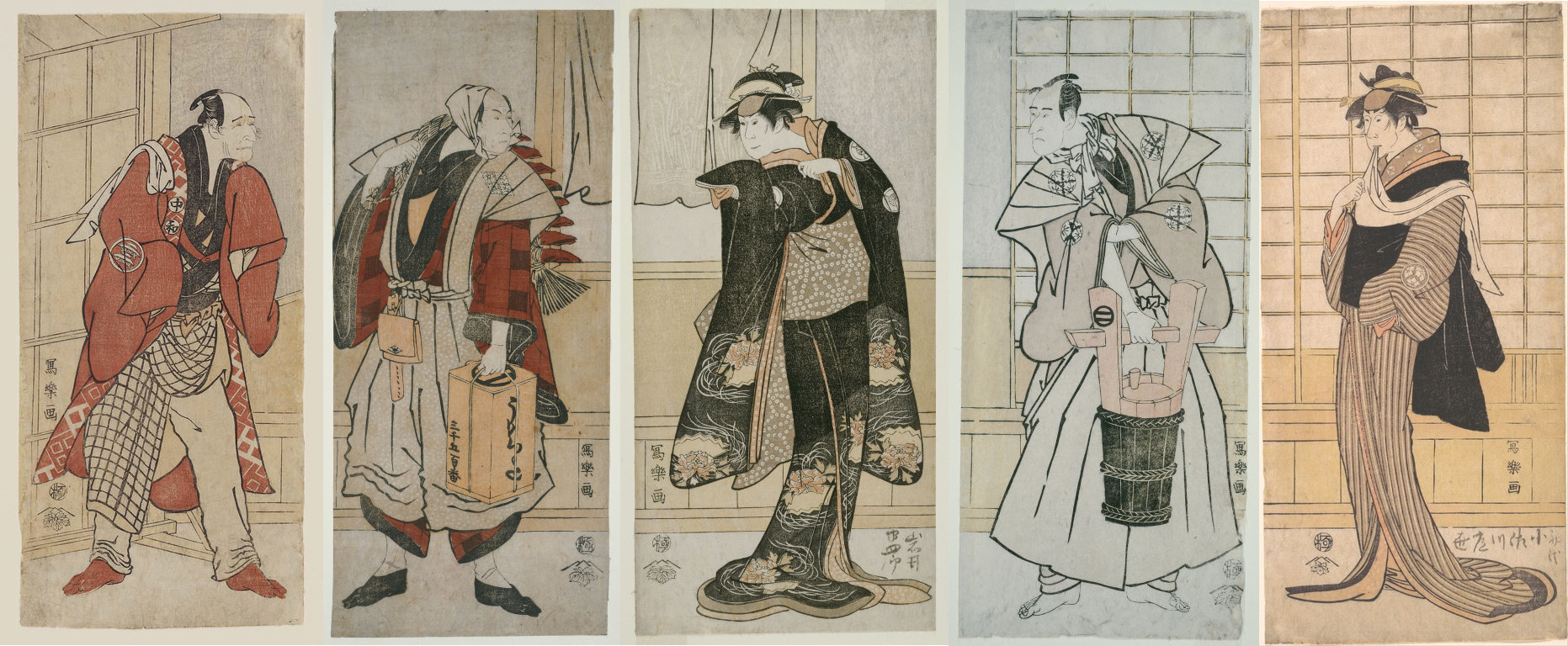
The prints from Matsu ha Misao Onna Kusunoki Niban-me form a pentaptych.

Matsu ha Misao Onna Kusunoki Niban-me (松貞婦女楠二番目) débuted at the Kawarazaki-za in the 11th month of the 6th year of Gansei.

The five prints here form a pentaptych.

==== Osagawa Tsuneyo II as the hairdresser O-Roku ====
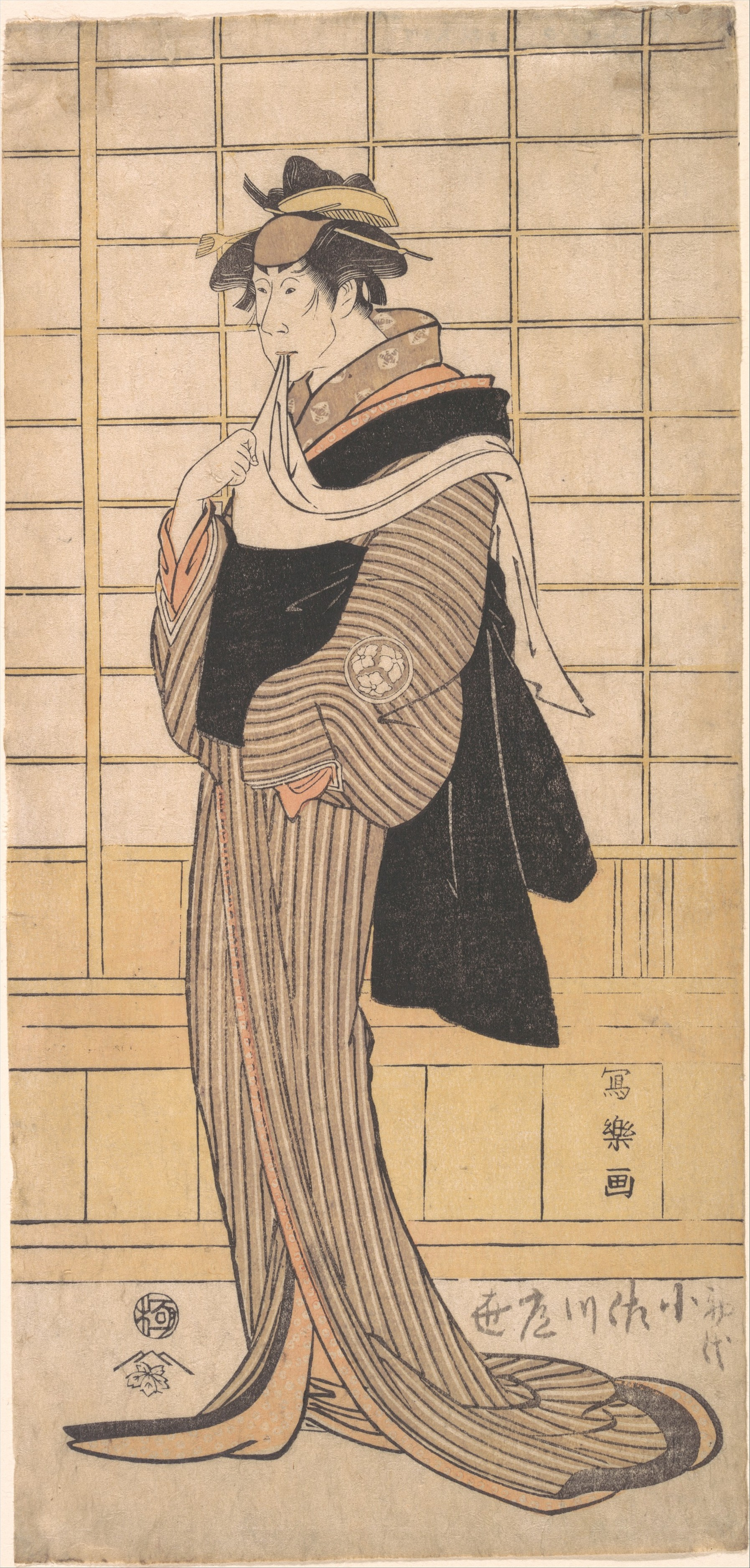

Three copies are known of the hosoban print of Osagawa Tsuneyo II as the hairdresser O-Roku (二世小佐川常世の女髪結すきぐしのお六 Nisei Osagawa Tsuneyo no onnakamiyui sukigushi O-Roku); one each are in the collections of the Museum of Fine Arts, Boston, the Guimet Museum, and the Metropolitan Museum of Art.

==== Ichikawa Komazō III as Oyamada Tarō Takaie ====
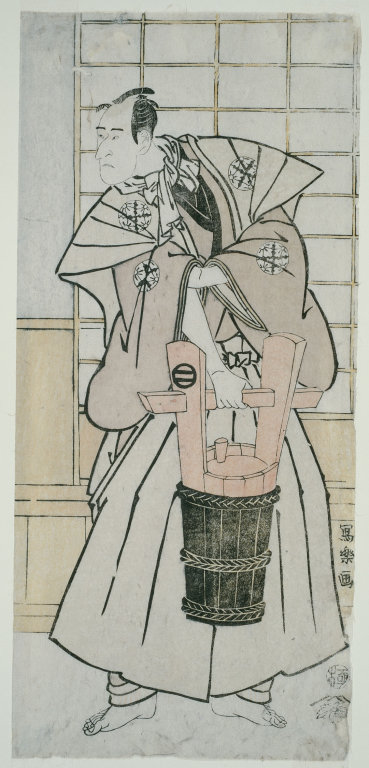

One copy is known of the hosoban print Ichikawa Komazō III as Oyamada Tarō Takaie (市川高麗蔵の小山田太郎高家 Ichikawa Komazō III as Oyamada Tarō Takaie); it is in the collection of the Art Institute of Chicago.

==== Iwai Hanshirō IV as O-Toma, daughter of O-Hina from Inamuragasaki in Kamakura ====
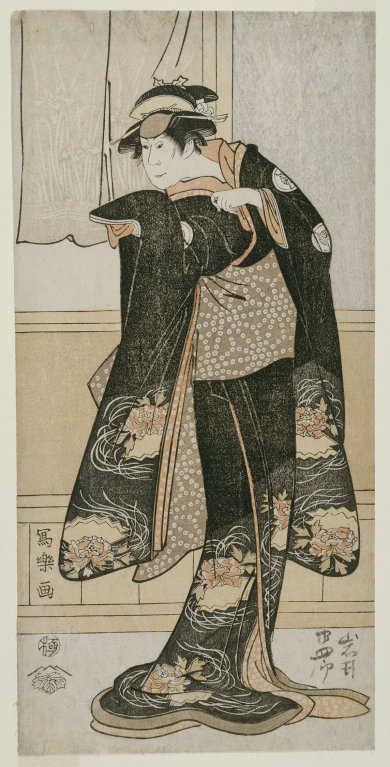

One copy is known of the hosoban print of Iwai Hanshirō IV as Otoma, daughter of Ohina from Inamuragasaki in Kamakura (四世岩井半四郎の鎌倉稲村が崎のおひな娘おとま Yonsei Iwai Hanshirō no Kamakura Inamuragasaki no O-Hina musume Otoma); it is in the collection of the Art Institute of Chicago.

==== Matsumoto Kōshirō IV as the boatman Minagawa Shin'emon of Reisengasaki in Kamakura, actually Hata Rokurōzaemon Tokiyoshi ====
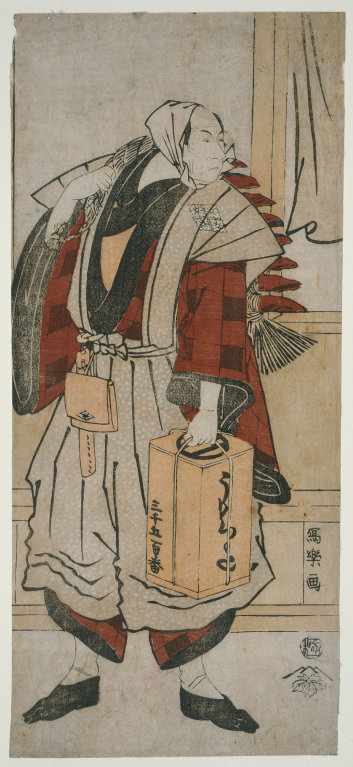

Six copies are known of the hosoban print of Matsumoto Kōshirō IV as Hata Rokurōzaemon Tokiyoshi disguised as the boatman Minagawa Shin'emon of Reisengasaki in Kamakura (四世松本幸四郎の鎌倉霊仙が崎の船頭皆川新左衛門実は畑六郎左衛門時能 Yonsei Matsumoto Kōshirō IV no Kamakura Reisengasaki no sendō Minagawa Shin'emon jitsu Hata Rokurōzaemon Tokiyoshi), one each in the collections of the Waseda University Tsubouchi Memorial Theatre Museum, the Art Institute of Chicago, and the Portland Art Museum, and one each in three private collections.

==== Nakajima Wadaemon I as Migawari no Jizō, the master of the house ====
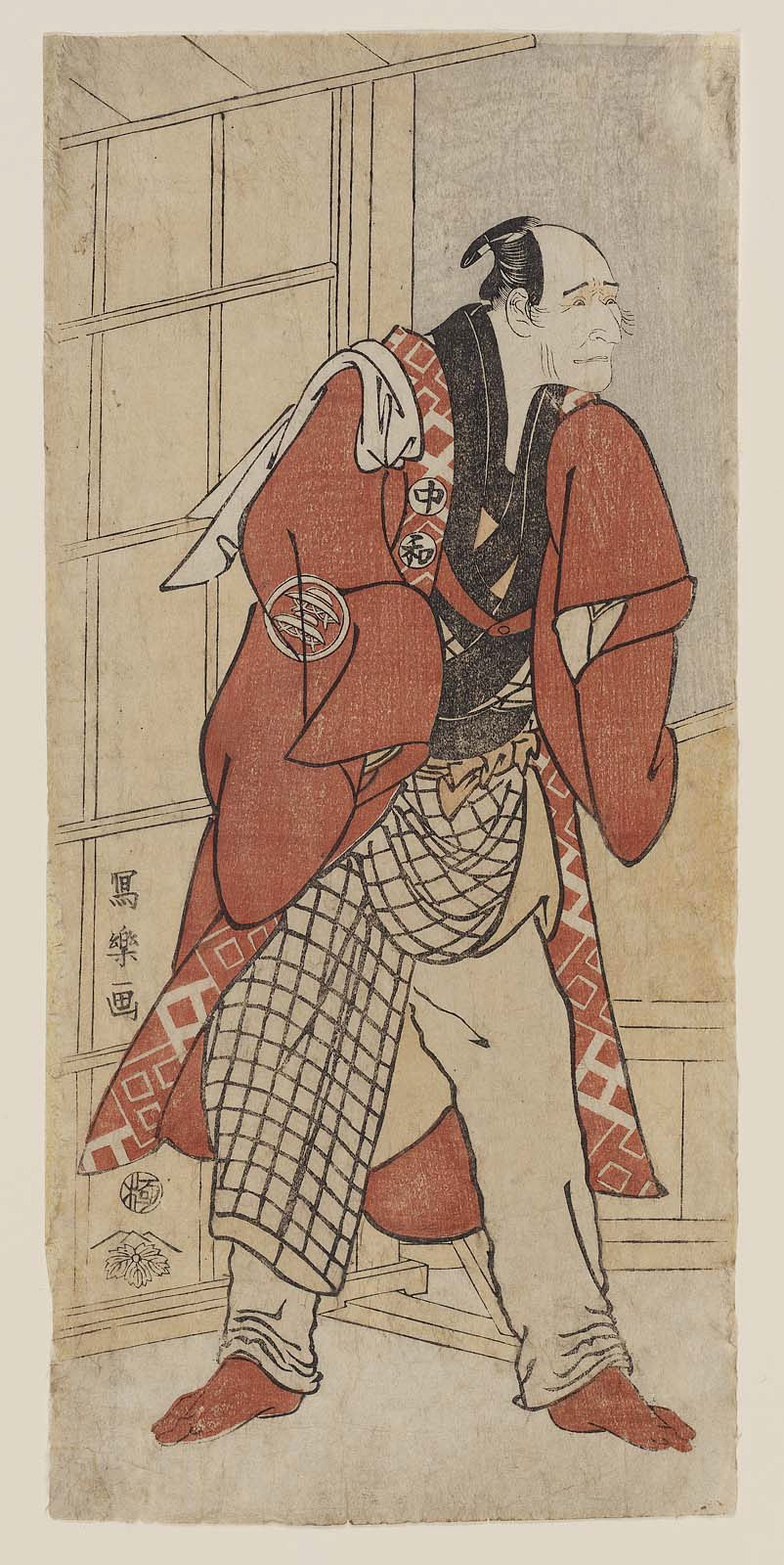

Three copies are known of the hosoban print of Nakajima Wadaemon I as Migawari no Jizō, the master of the house (初世中島和田右衛門の家主身替りの地蔵 Shosei Nakajima Wadaemon no yanushi Migawari no Jizō); one each are in the collections of the Museum of Fine Arts, Boston, the Brooklyn Museum, and the Art Institute of Chicago.

=== Matsu ha Misao Onna Kusunoki Shin Kyōgen ===
Matsu ha Misao Onna Kusunoki Shin Kyōgen (松貞婦女楠新狂言) débuted at the Kawarazaki-za in the 11th month of the 6th year of Gansei.

==== Ichikawa Komazō III as Ōdate Sabanosuke Terukado ====
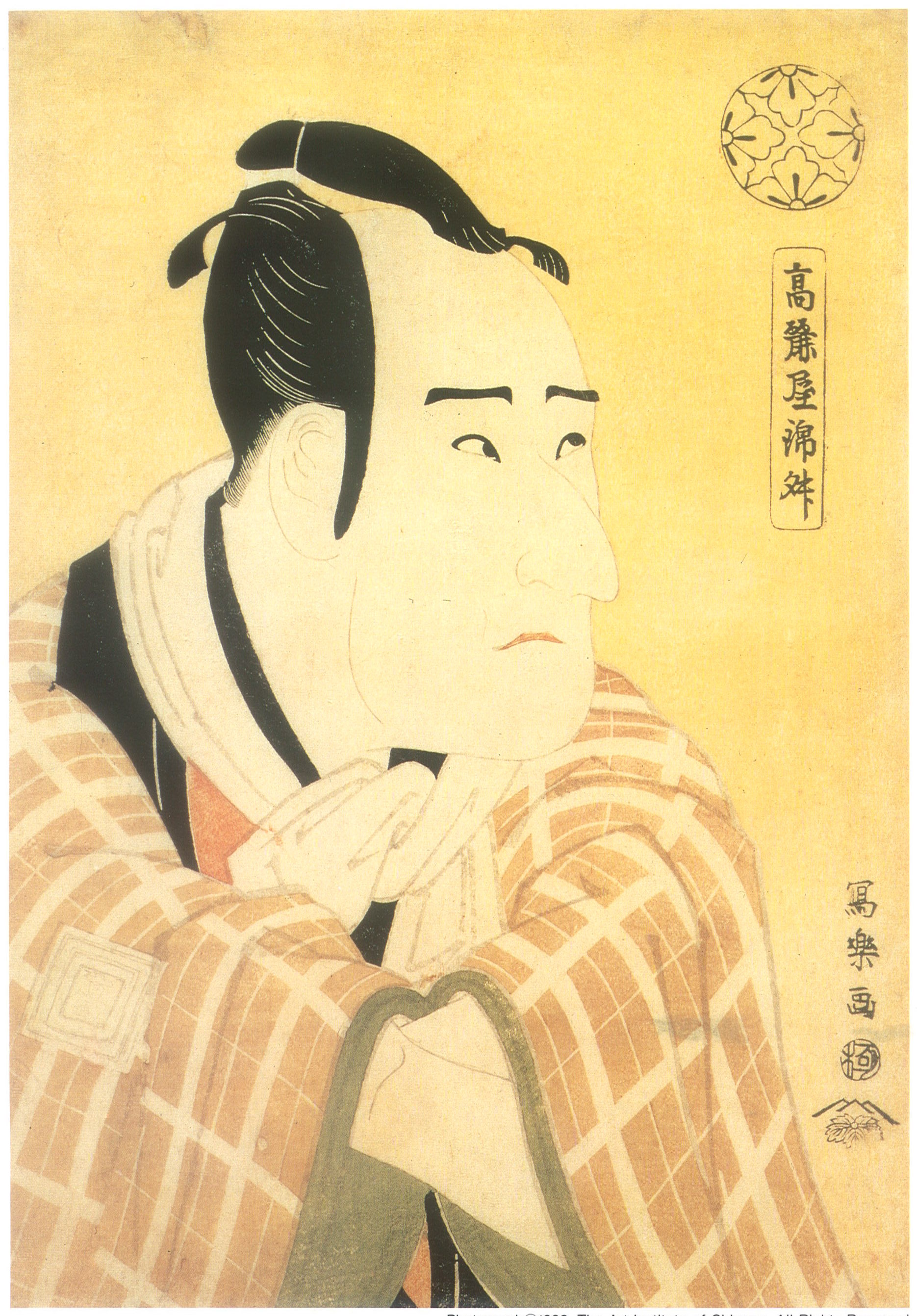

Three copies are known of the aiban print of Ichikawa Komazō III as Ōdate Sabanosuke Terukado (三世市川高麗蔵の大館左馬之介てるかど Sansei Ichikawa Komazō no Ōdate Sabanosuke Terukado), one each in the collections of the Art Institute of Chicago, the National Museum, Kraków, and the Portland Art Museum. The print was earlier thought to be of Ichikawa Komazō III as Oyamada Tarō (三世市川高麗蔵の小山田太郎 Sansei Ichikawa Komazō no Oyamada Tarō).

==== Iwai Hanshirō IV as San, the maid servant of Ukiyonosuke, actually Saeda, the younger sister of Sabanosuke ====
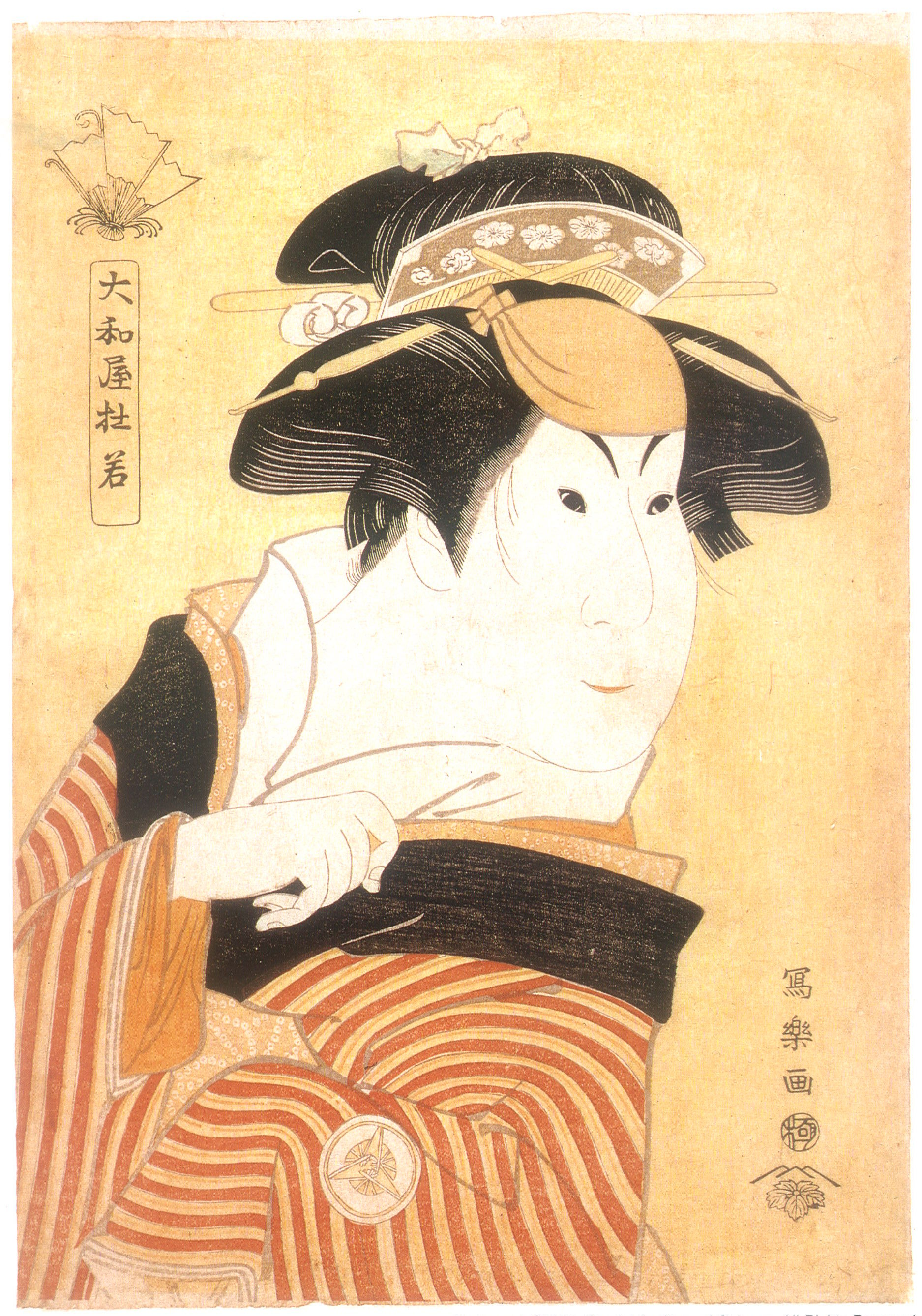

One copy is known of the aiban print of Iwai Hanshirō IV as Sabanosuke's younger sister Saeda disguised as Ukiyonosuke's maid servant San (四世岩井半四郎の浮世之助下女さん実は左馬之助妹さへだ（大和屋杜若） Yonsei Iwai Hanshirō no Ukiyonosuke gejo San jitsu wa Sabanosuke imōto Saeda (Yamatoya Tojaku)); it is in the collection of the Art Institute of Chicago.

=== Hana no Miyako Kuruwa no Nawabari ===
Hana no Miyako Kuruwa no Nawabari (花都廓縄張) débuted at the Miyako-za in the 11th month of the 6th year of Gansei.

==== Bandō Mitsugorō II as the manservant Kugahei ====
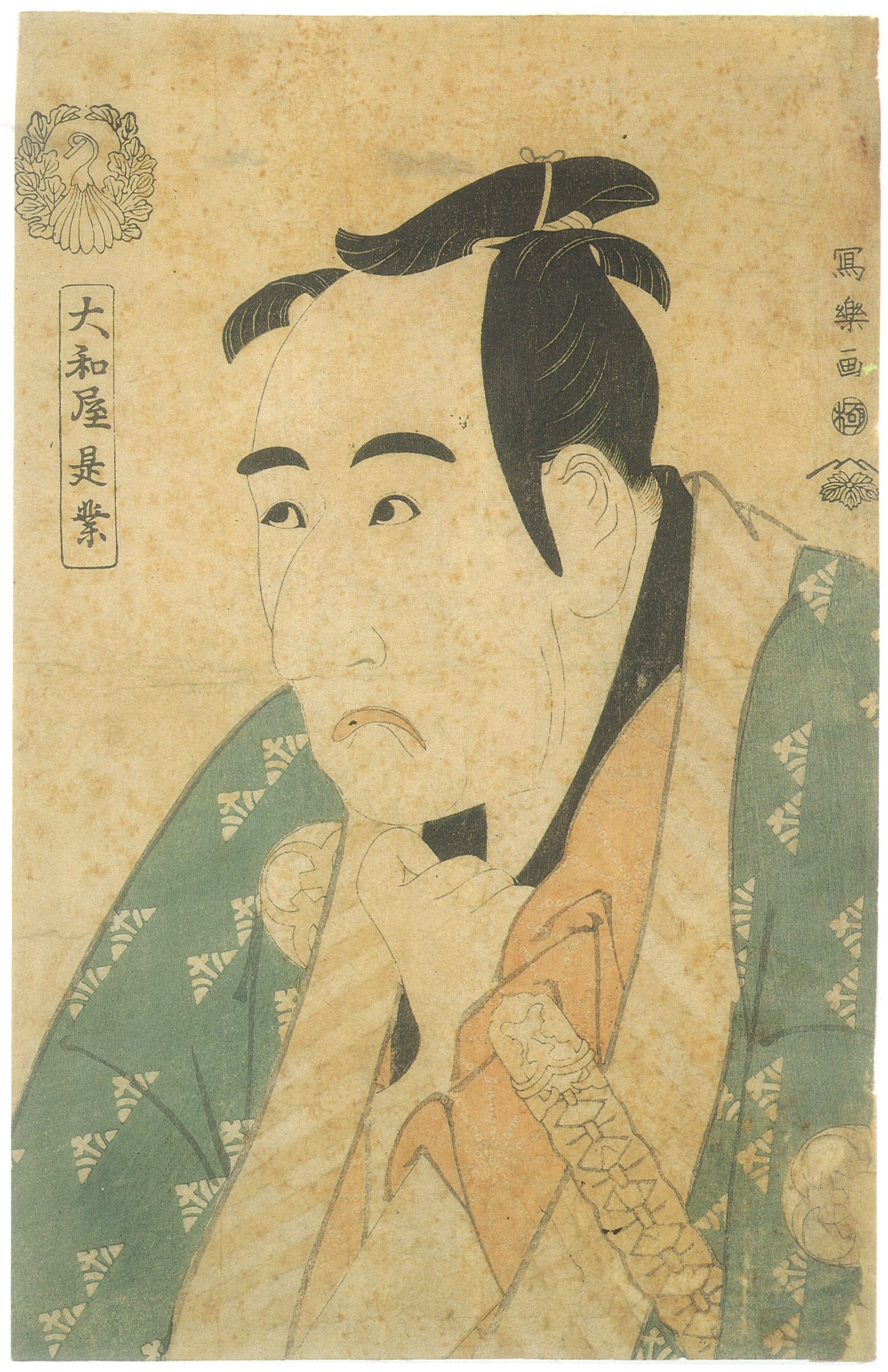

Two copies are known of the aiban print of Bandō Mitsugorō II as the manservant Kugahei (二世坂東三津五郎の奴くが平（大和屋是業） Nisei Bandō Mitsugorō no yakko Kugahei); one is at the Tokyo National Museum, the other in a private collection.

==== Segawa Kikunojō III as the maid O-Hama, actually the wife of Inanami Rukurōdayū (Hamamuraya Rokō) ====
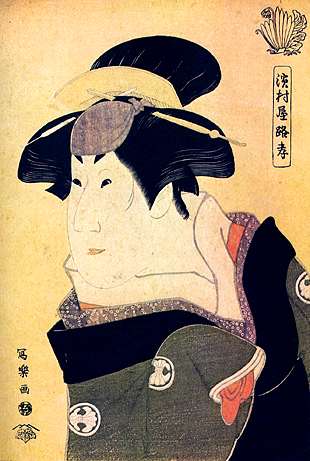

Four copies are known of the aiban print of Segawa Kikunojō III as the maid O-Hama (三世瀬川菊之丞の仲居おはま実は稲波六郎太夫妻（浜村屋路孝） Sansei Segawa Kikunojō no nakai O-Hama jitsu ha Inanami Rukurōdayū tsuma (Hamamuraya Rokō); one each are in the collections of the Tokyo National Museum, the Museum of Fine Arts, Boston, the Art Institute of Chicago, and the Guimet Museum.

==== Arashi Ryūzō II as the manservant Namihei (Toraya Toramaru) ====
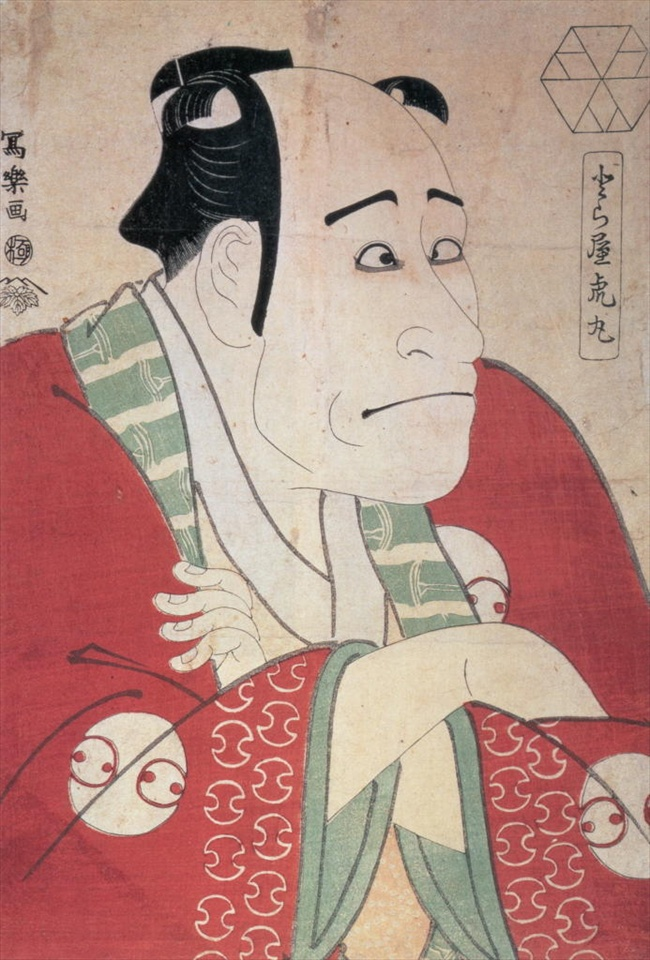

One copy is known of the aiban print of Arashi Ryūzō II as the manservant Namihei (Toraya Toramaru) (二世嵐龍蔵の奴なみ平（とら屋虎丸） Nisei Arashi Ryūzō no yakko Namihei (Toraya Toramaru)); it is in the Royal Museums of Art and History.

== Fourth period ==
10 hosoban and 5 aiban prints make up the fourth period from the first month of Kansei 7 (1795). 3 prints come from Nido no Kake Katsuiro Soga at the Kiri-za; 7 from Edo Sunago Kichirei Soga and Godairiki Koi no Fūjime at the Miyako-za; 1 is a sumo print; 2 are musha-e warrior prints; and 1 is of the god of luck Ebisu.

=== Edo Sunago Kichirei Soga ===
Edo Sunago Kichirei Soga (江戸砂子慶書我) débuted at the Miyako-za in the 1st month of the 7th year of Gansei.

==== Bandō Hikosaburō III as Kudōzaemon Suketsune ====
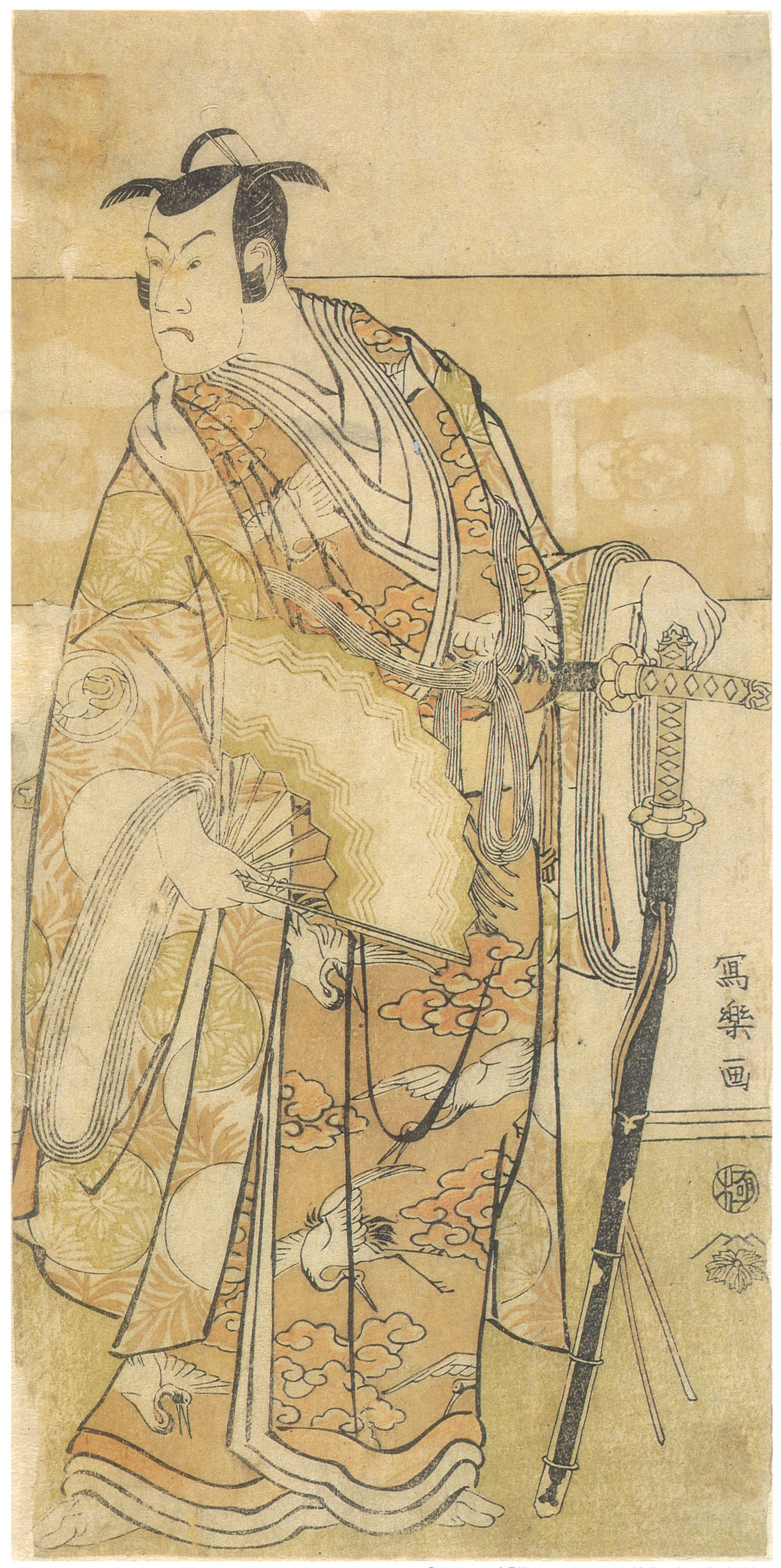

Two copies are known of the hosoban print of Bandō Hikosaburō III as Kudōzaemon Suketsune (三世坂東彦三郎の工藤左衛門祐経 Bandō Hikosaburō no Kudōzaemon Suketsune); one each is in the collections of the Tokyo National Museum and the National Museum of Ethnology.

==== Sawamura Sōjūrō III as Soga Jūrō Sukenari ====
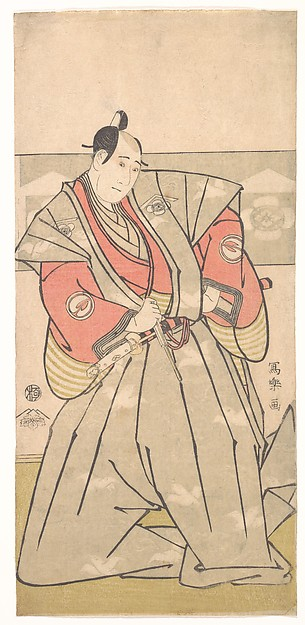

Three copies are known of the hosoban print of Sawamura Sōjūrō III as Soga Jūrō Sukenari (三世澤村宗十郎の曾我十郎祐成 Sansei Sawamura Sōjūrō no Soga Jūrō Sukenari); one each is in the collections of the Tokyo National Museum and the Metropolitan Museum of Art, and in the M. Walter Amstutz Collection.

==== Bandō Mitsugorō II as Soga Gorō Tokimune ====
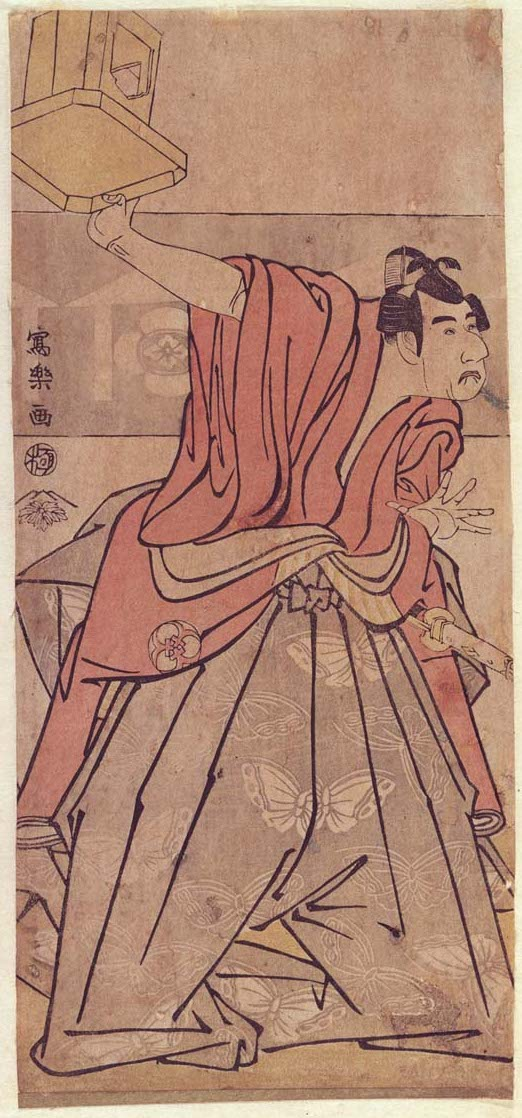

One copy is known of the hosoban print of Bandō Mitsugorō II as Soga Gorō Tokimune (坂東三津五郎の曽我五郎時致 Bandō Mitsugorō no Soga Gorō Tokimune); it is in the collection of the Tokyo National Museum.

=== Edo Sunago Kichirei Soga Niban-me ===
Edo Sunago Kichirei Soga Niban-me (江戸砂子慶書我二番目, later titled Godairiki Koi no Fūjime 五大力恋緘) débuted at the Miyako-za in the 1st month of the 7th year of Gansei. It is based on an incident from 1742 in which the Satsuma samurai Hayata Hachiemon killed five people in Osaka. This version is a revision of an adaptation under the title Godairiki Koi no Fūjime that débuted in Kyoto the previous year; the Edo version did not take the title Godairiki Koi no Fūjime until 1800.

==== Segawa Tomisaburō II as the maid Ochiyo ====
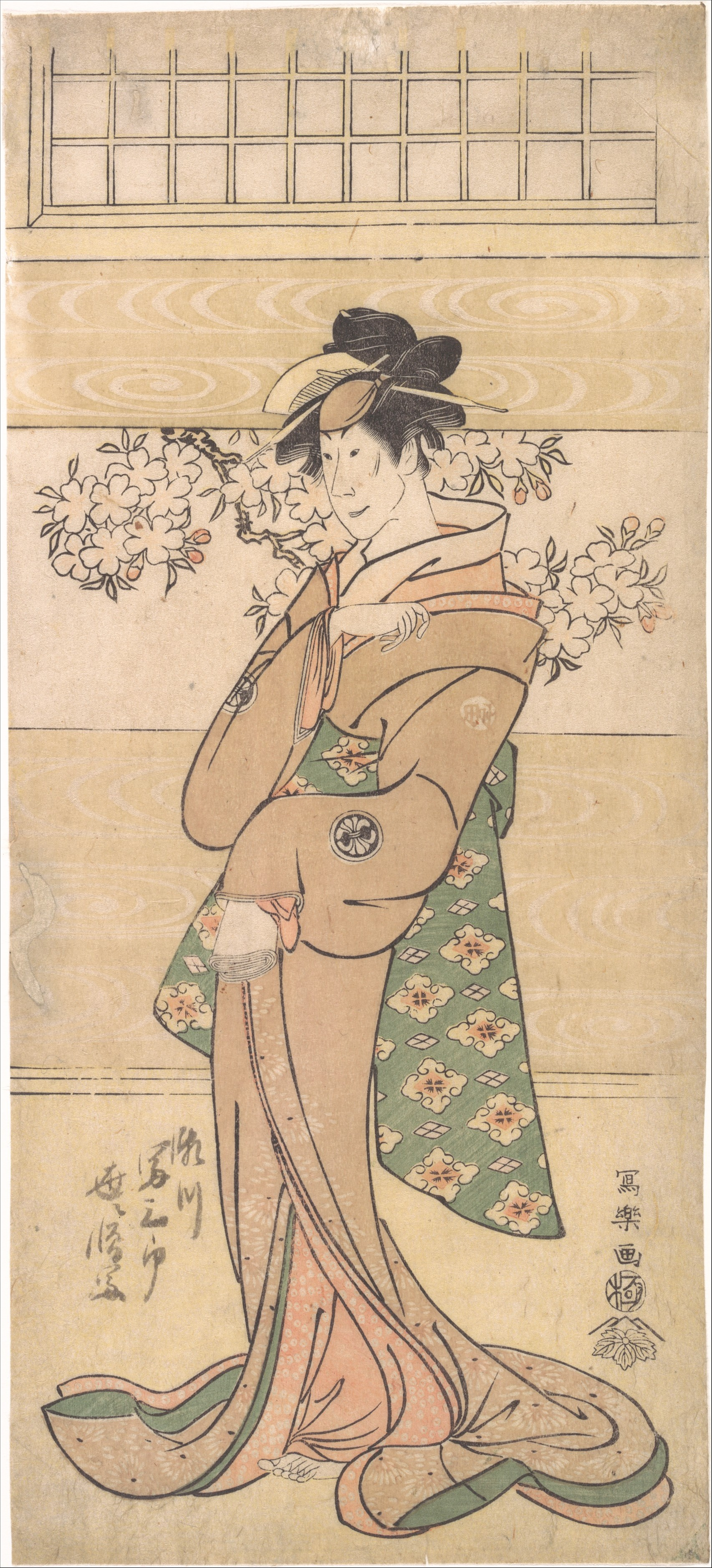

One copy of the hosoban print of Segawa Tomisaburō II as the maid Ochiyo is known and is in the collection of the Metropolitan Museum of Art. The print was earlier believed to have been of the geisha Asaka.

==== Segawa Yūjirō II as the maid Otowa ====
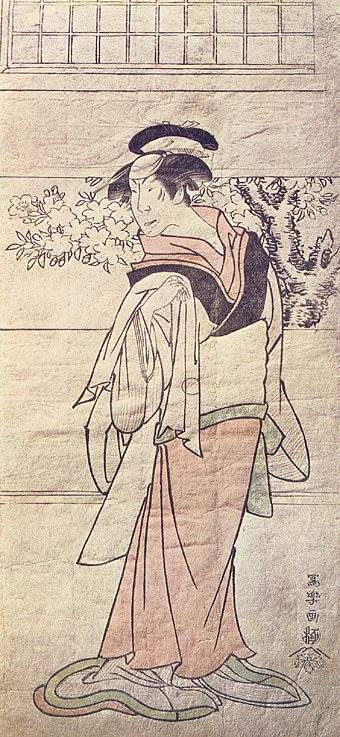

One copy is known of the hosoban print of Segawa Yūjirō II as the maid Otowa (二世瀬川雄次郎の仲居おとわ Nisei Segawa Yūjirō no nakai Otowa); it is in a private collection.

==== Sawamura Sōjūrō III as Satsuma Gengobei ====
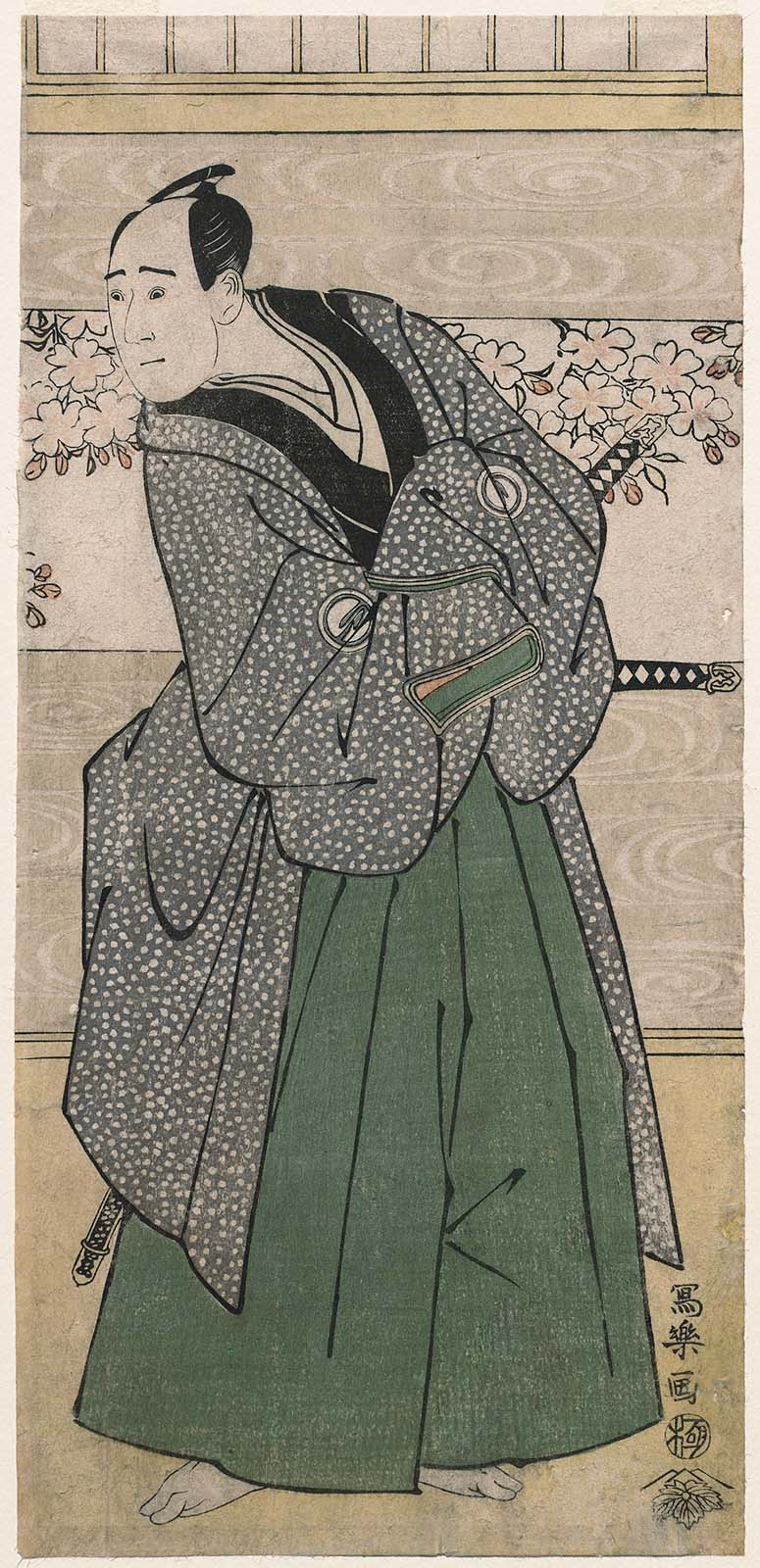

Two copies are known of the hosoban print of Sawamura Sōjūrō III as Satsuma Gengobei (三世沢村宗十郎の薩摩源五兵衛 Sawamura Sōjūrō no Satsuma Gengobei), one each in the collections of the Tokyo National Museum and the Museum of Fine Arts, Boston.

==== Iwao Kumesaburō I as the geisha Kumekichi ====
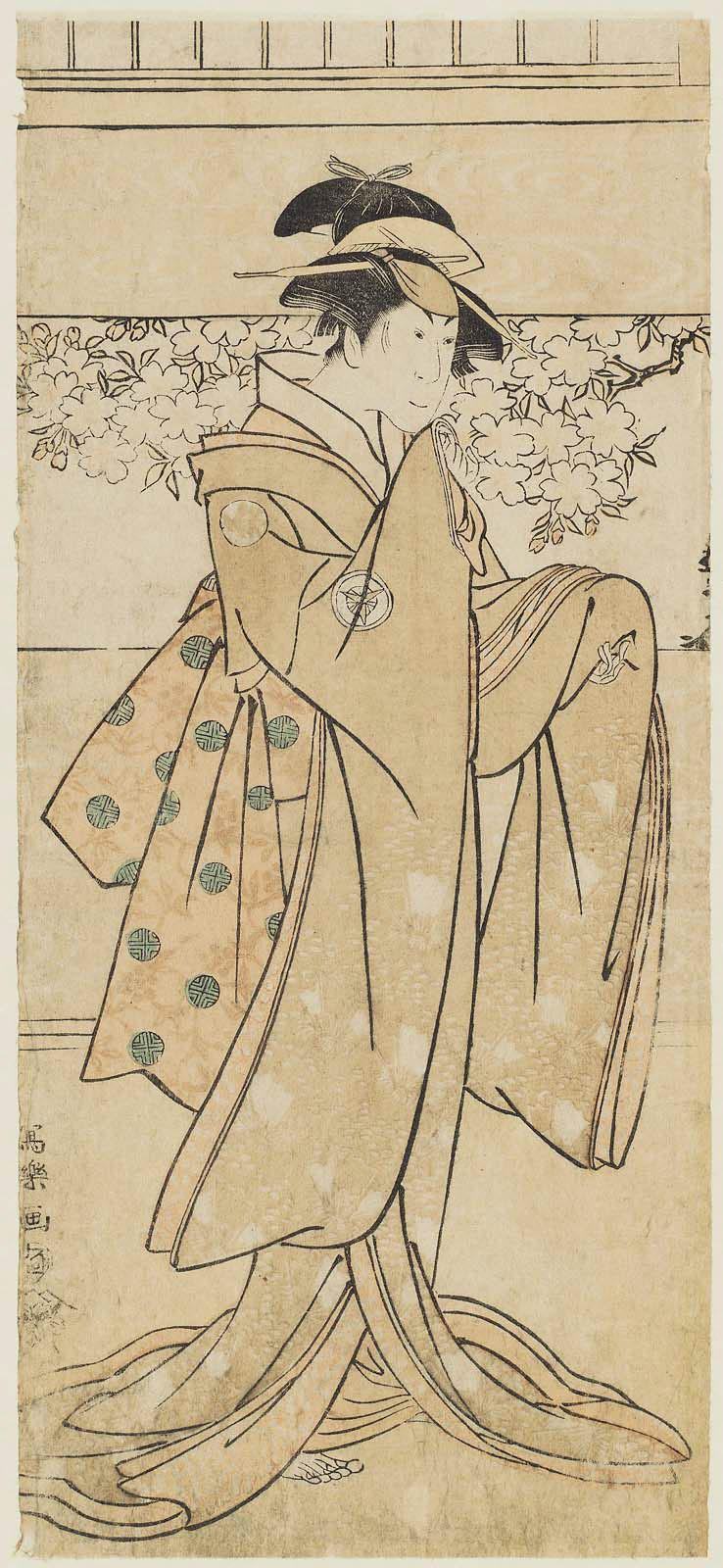

One copy is known of the hosoban print of Iwao Kumesaburō I as the geisha Kumekichi (初世岩井粂三郎芸者久米吉 Shosei Iwao Kumesaburō no geisha Kumekichi); it is in the collection of the Museum of Fine Arts, Boston.

=== Nido no Kake Katsuiro Soga ===
Nido no Kake Katsuiro Soga (再魁槑曾我) débuted at the Kiri-za in the 1st month of the 7th year of Gansei.

==== Ichikawa Ebizō I as Kudōzaemon Suketsune ====
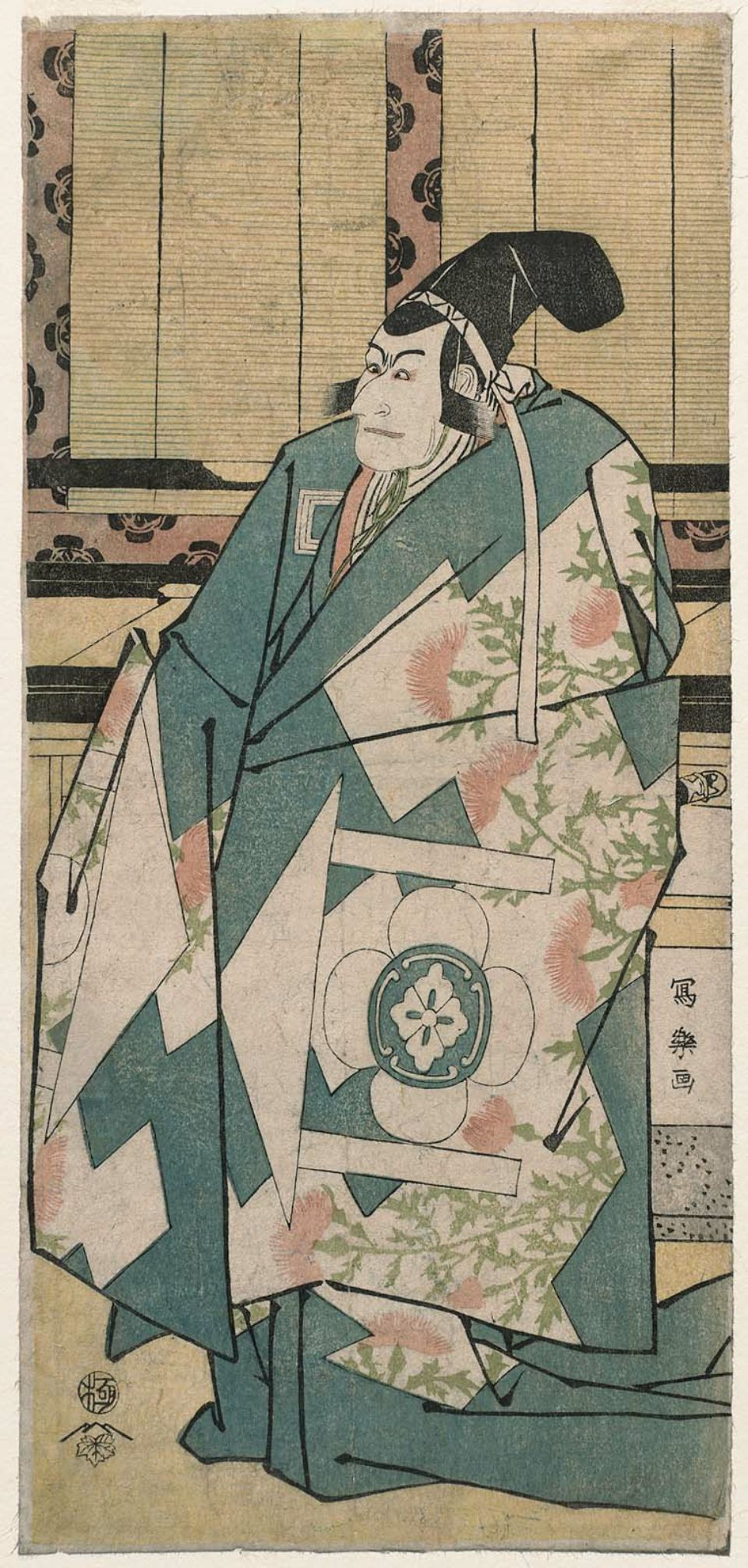

Three copies are known of the hosoban print of Ichikawa Ebizō I as Kudōzaemon Suketsune (初世市川海老蔵の工藤左衛門祐経 Shosei Ichikawa Ebizō no Kudōzaemon Suketsune); one each are in the collections of the Museum of Fine Arts, Boston, the Art Institute of Chicago, and the Guimet Museum.

==== Ichikawa Danjūrō VI as Soga Gōrō Tokimune ====
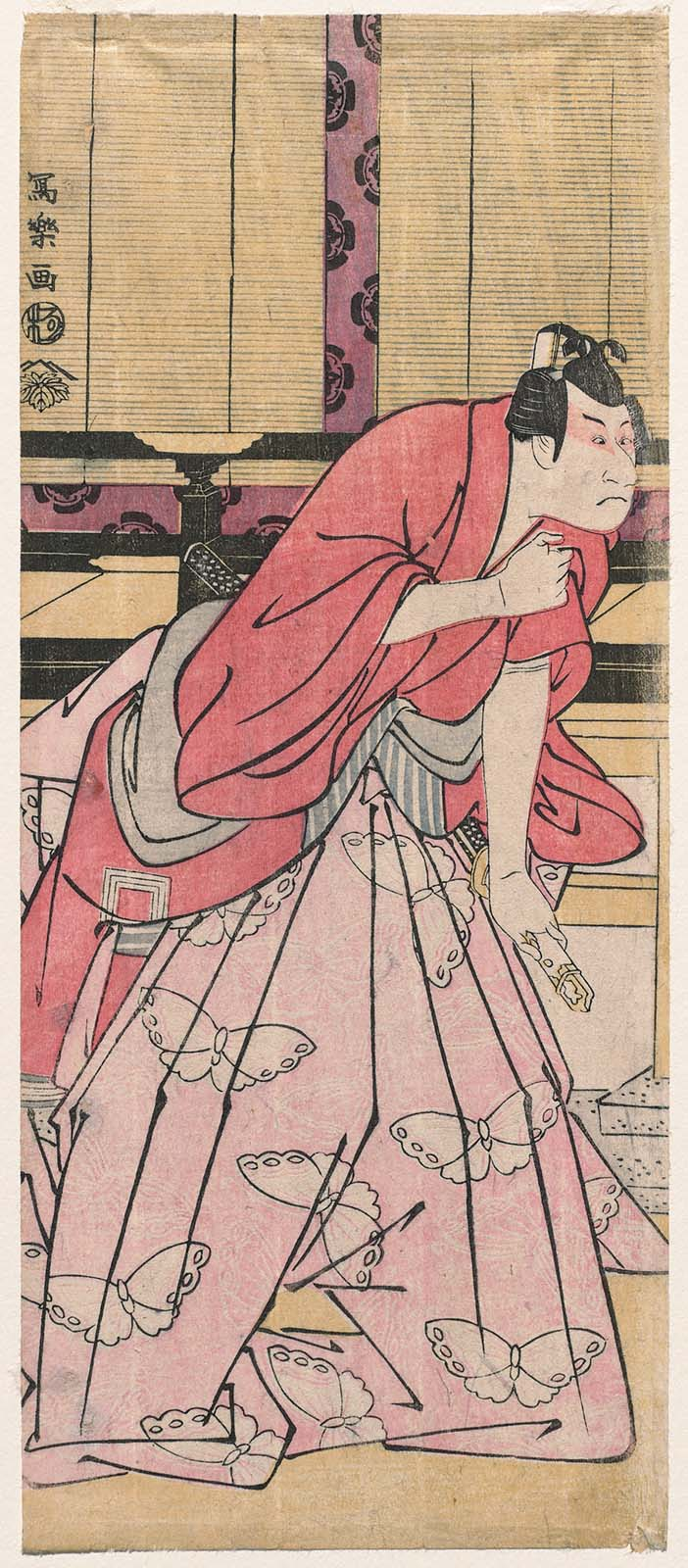

Two copies are known of the hosoban print of Ichikawa Danjūrō VI as Soga Gōrō Tokimune (六世市川団十郎の曽我五郎時宗 Rokusei Ichikawa Danjūrō no Soga Gōrō Tokimune); one each are in the collections of the Museum of Fine Arts, Boston and the Art Institute of Chicago.

==== Ichikawa Yaozō III as Soga Jūrō Sukenari ====
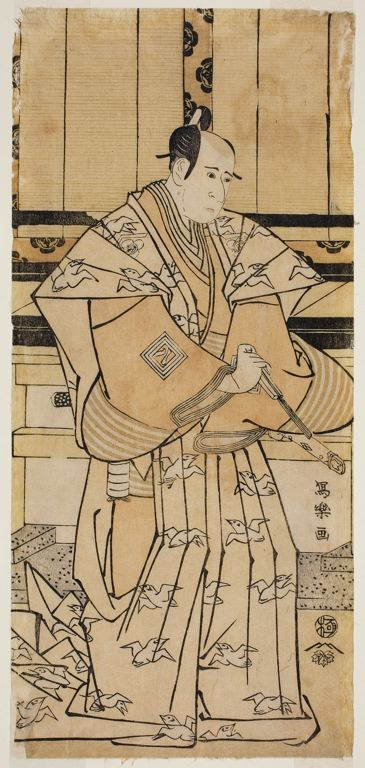

Ichikawa Yaozō III as Soga Jūrō Sukenari (市川八百蔵の曽我十郎祐成 Ichikawa Yaozō no Soga Jūrō Sukenari)

One copy is known of the hosoban print of Ichikawa Yaozō III as Soga Jūrō Sukenari (市川八百蔵の曽我十郎祐成 Ichikawa Yaozō no Soga Jūrō Sukenari); it is in the collection of the Art Institute of Chicago.

== Other prints ==
=== Sumo prints ===
Daidōzan Bungorō was born in what is now Yamagata Prefecture in 1788. By 1794 he weighed 83 kilograms (183 lb) at a height of 117 centimetres (46 in). He attracted attention for his size, and drew crowds at sumo tournaments, where he dressed as a sumo wrestler and performed ring-entering ceremonies. Such was his popularity that he appeared in at least 25 prints between 1794 and 1798 by popular ukiyo-e artists such as Utamaro.

==== Daidōzan Bungorō enters the sumo ring (triptych) ====
aiban triptych of Daidōzan Bungorō entering the sumo ring (大童山文五郎の土俵入り Daidōzan Bungorō no Dohyōiri)

Two sets of the triptych are known, one at the MOA Museum of Art and the other in a private collection. The Sumo Museum in Tokyo has another copy of the central print.

Daidōzan Bungorō enters the sumo ring

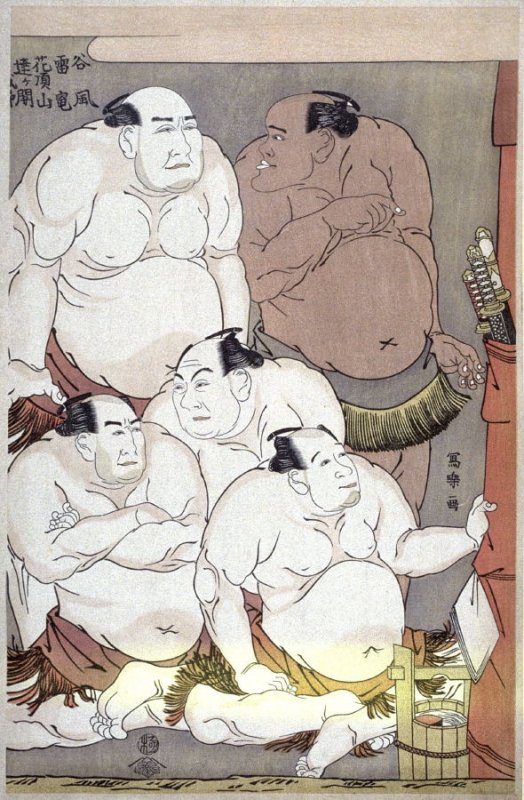

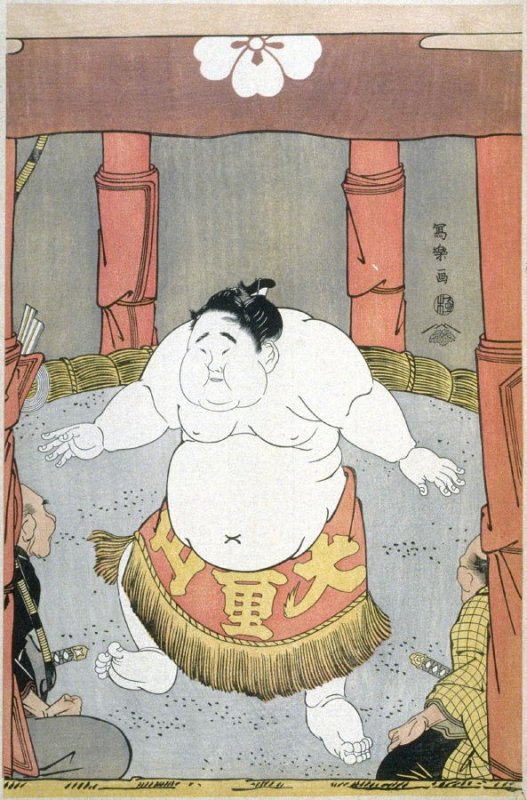

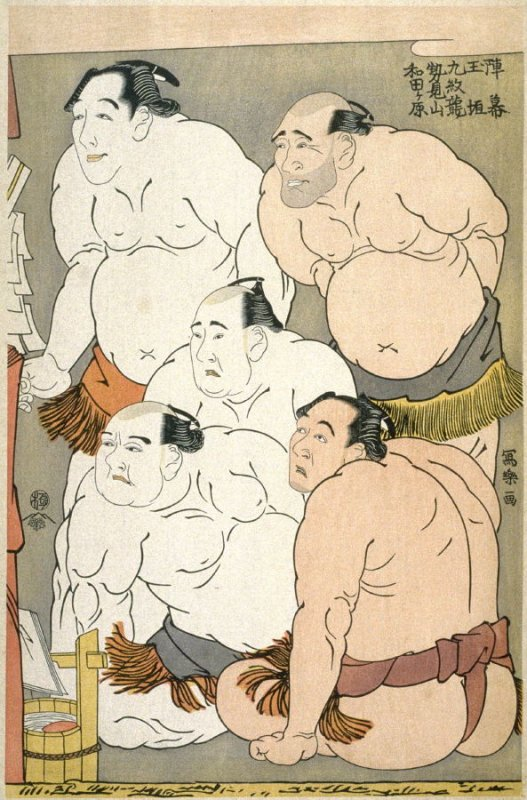

==== Daidōzan Bungorō enters the sumo ring (single sheet) ====
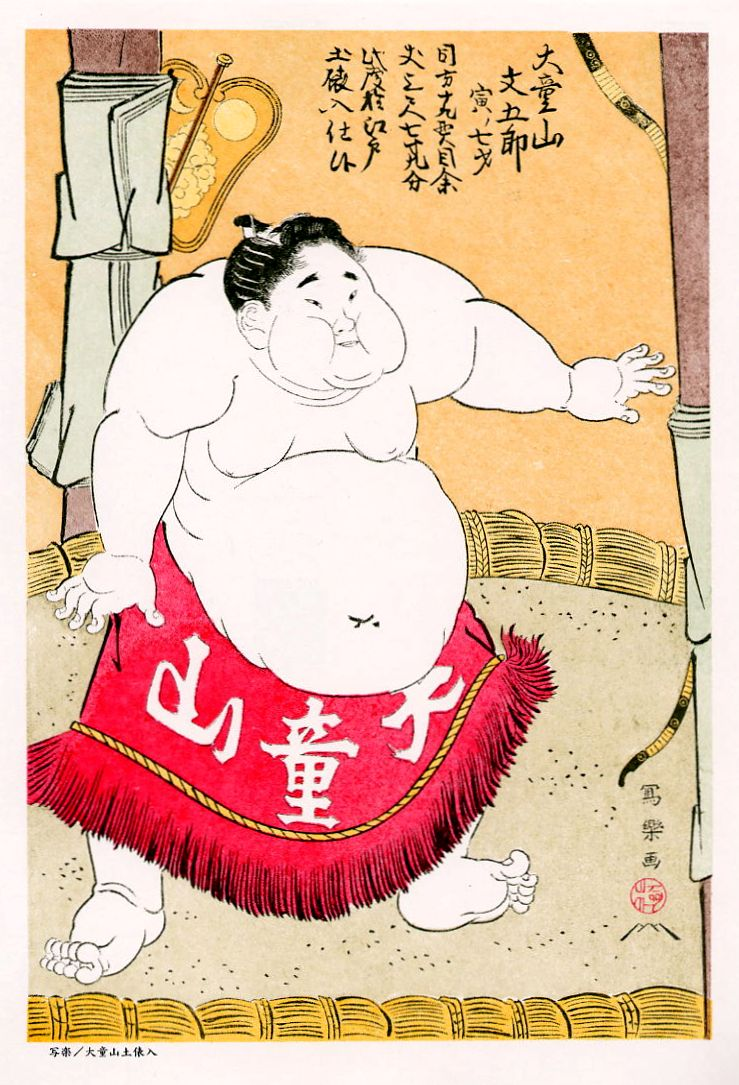

One copy is known of the single sheet aiban print of Daidōzan Bungorō entering the sumo ring (大童山文五郎の土俵入り Daidōzan Bungorō no dohyōiri) and is in the collection of the Hiraki Ukiyo-e Foundation.

The legend at the top of the print reads:

大童山 文五郎 寅ﾉ七才 目方十九貫目余 丈三尺七寸九分 此度於江戸 土俵入仕候
Daidōzan Bungorō, tora no nana-sai, mekata jūkyū kanme-yo, take san-shaku nana-sun kyū-bu konotabi oite Edo dohyōiri sōrō
Daidōzan Bungorō, age seven; weight: just over 19 kanme; height: seven shaku, seven sun, nine bu; entering the sumo ring this time in Edo

==== Daidōzan Bungorō lifting a go board ====
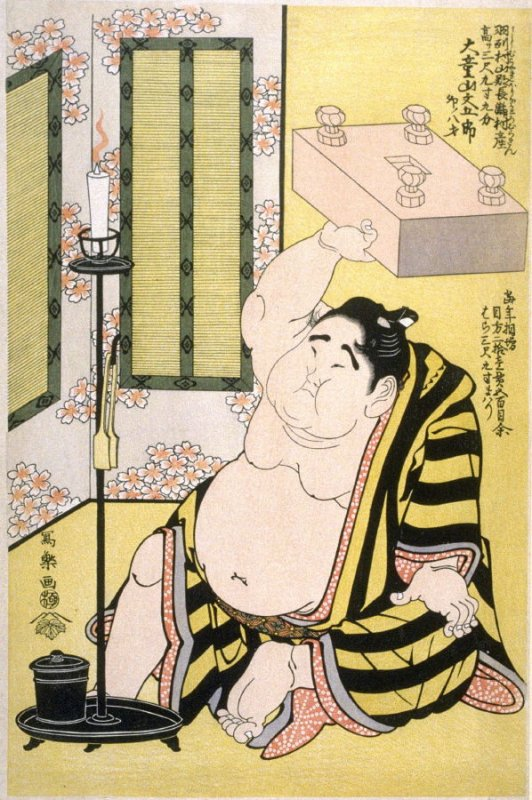

==== Daidōzan Bungorō quelling a demon ====
Daidōzan Bungorō quelling a demon (大童山文五郎 鬼退治 Daidōzan Bungorō Oni-taiji)

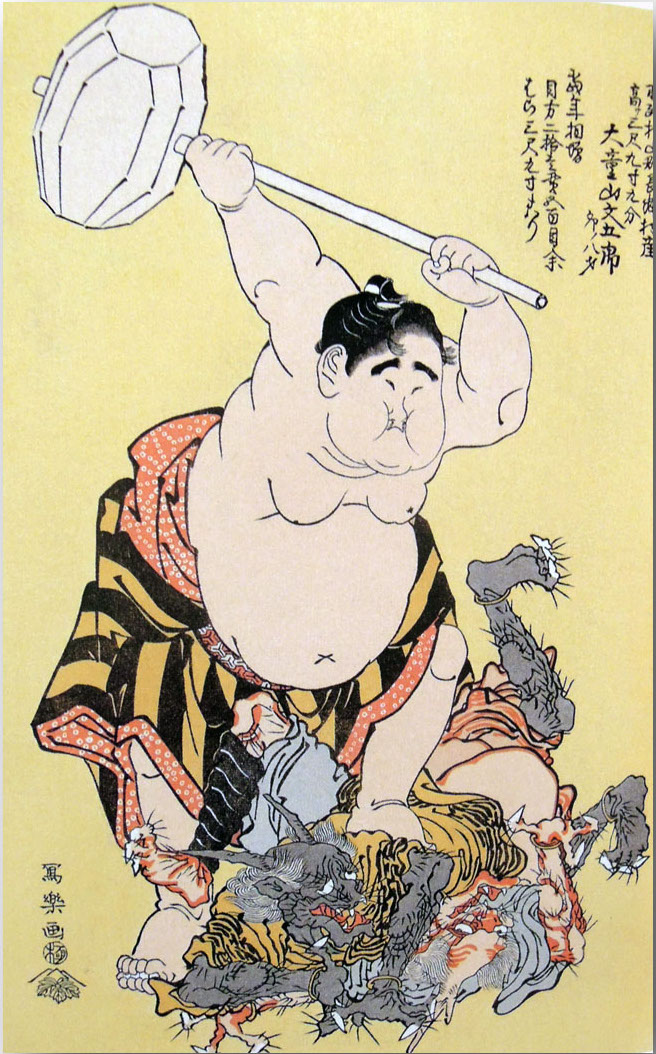

The print depicts Daidōzan standing on the back of a blue oni demon, poised to strike at it with a wooden mallet. The legend at the top gives Daidōzan's weight as 21 kan, 500 monme (about 79 kg), and his girth as 3 shaku, 9 sun (about 121 cm)—measurements considerably larger than the year before.

=== Miscellaneous prints ===
Sharaku produced only two known musha-e warrior prints: one of Soga Gorō battling Gosho Gorōmaru and the other of Taira no Koremichi battling an oni demon at a maple-leaf viewing party. Such prints may have been an attempt by Sharaku to avoid being pigeon-holed as an actor-print designer.

==== Soga Gorō and Gosho Gorōmaru ====
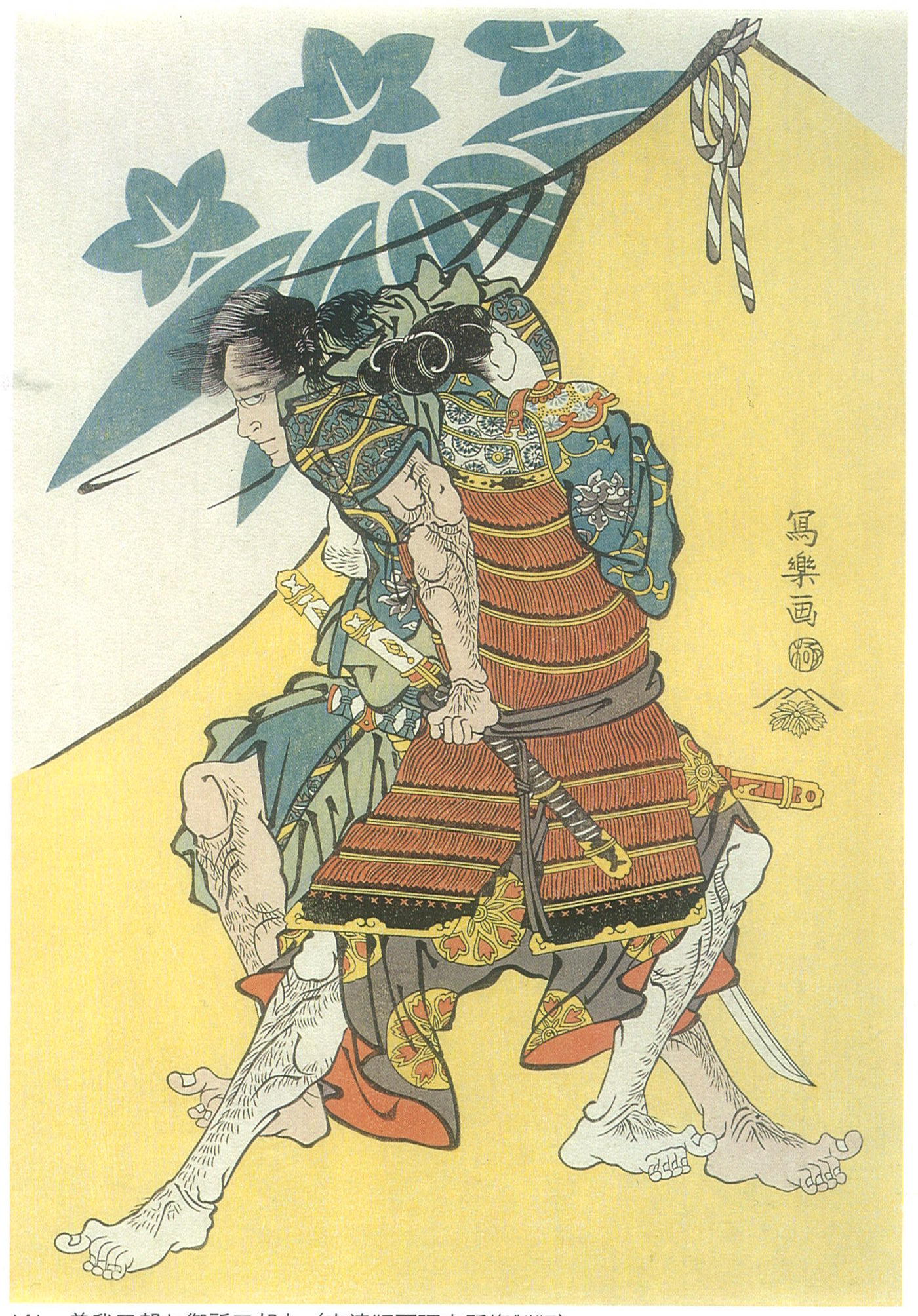

One copy is known of the aiban print of Soga Gorō and Gosho Gorōmaru 曽我五郎と御所五郎丸 Soga Gorō and Gosho Gorōmaru); it is in the collection of the Hiraki Ukiyo-e Foundation.

In 1193 the shōgun Minamoto no Yoritomo held the Fuji no Makigari, a grand hunting party in the area of Mount Fuji. There, the Soga brothers Jurō and Gorō killed Kudō Suketsune, a retainer of Yoritomo's and the murderer of the soga brothers' father. In the ensuing fighting Jurō was killed and Gorō captured by the sumo wrestler Gosho Gorōmaru, who served at Yoritomo's palace (御所 gosho).

Gorōmaru's hair is tied in a karawa-mage topknot, a hairstyle worn by male youths during the Kamakura period.

==== Maple leaf-viewing ====
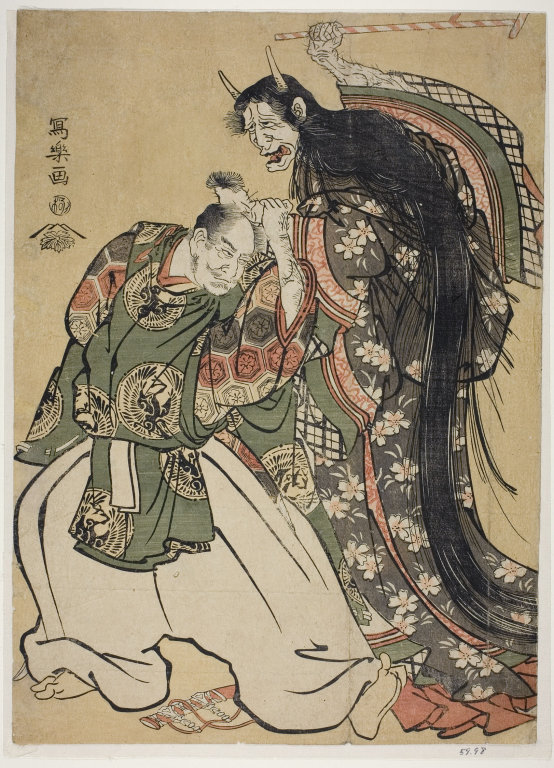

One copy is known of the aiban print of maple (Note: The "maple" here refers to the Japanese maple, Acer palmatum) leaf-viewing (紅葉狩 写楽 Momiji-gari); it is in the collection of the Art Institute of Chicago.

The print illustrates the Momiji Densetsu, which has had various theatrical and other adaptations. The story tells of the Heian-period warrior Taira no Koremichi, who comes across a respectable woman and her handmaidens holding a maple leaf-viewing party. He joins the party and drinks himself unconscious. When he awakens, the women have revealed themselves as oni demons. The print illustrates a fierce battle between Koremichi and a demon who holds him by the topknot.

==== Ebisu ====
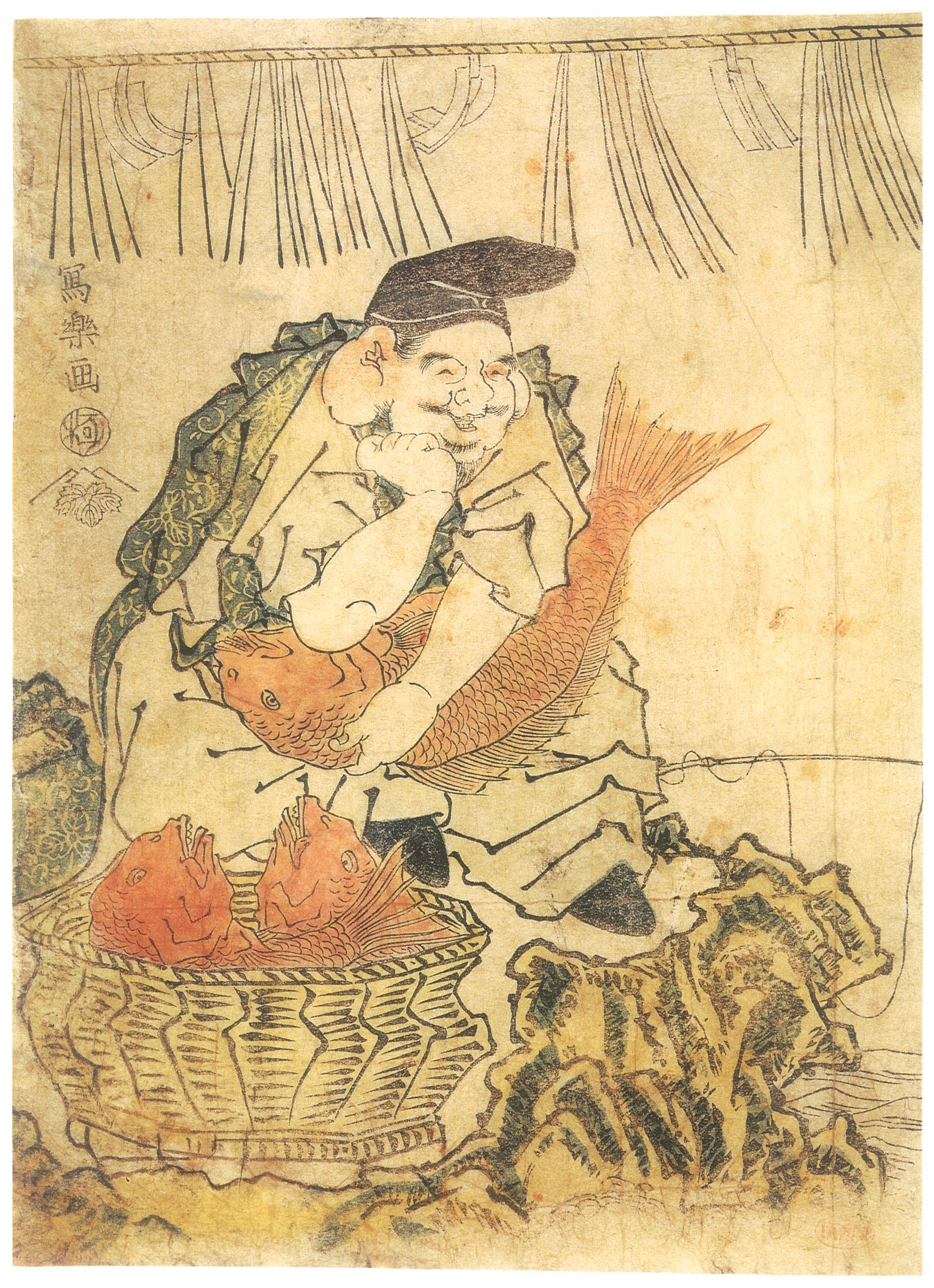

One copy is known of the aiban print of Ebisu (恵比寿), one of the Seven Lucky Gods in Japanese mythology; it is in the collection of the Japan Ukiyo-e Museum.

Since the beginning of the Edo period, merchants in particular worshipped Ebisu as the god of wealth, long life, and happiness. He wears a pointed kazaori eboshi hat, sits beneath a Shintō shimenawa rope, and fishes from a waterside boulder. He has abnormally large ears and grins widely, despite his entangled fishing line.

=== Hand fans ===
==== Otafuku ====
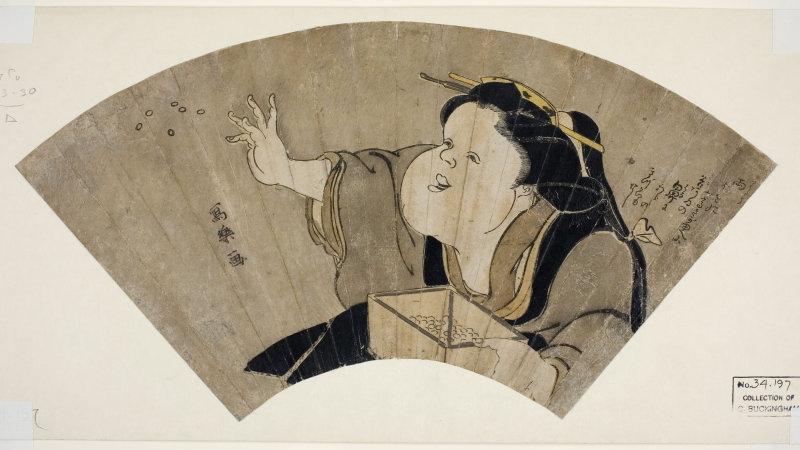

One example is known of the sensu folding hand fan bearing the likeness of Otafuku (扇面お多福図 Senmen Otafuku zu); it is in the collection of the Art Institute of Chicago. The printed fan measures 21.2 × 40.8 cm and depicts Otafuku throwing roasted soybeans to ward away oni demons during Setsubun, at the traditional Japanese Lunar New Year.

==== Old man ====
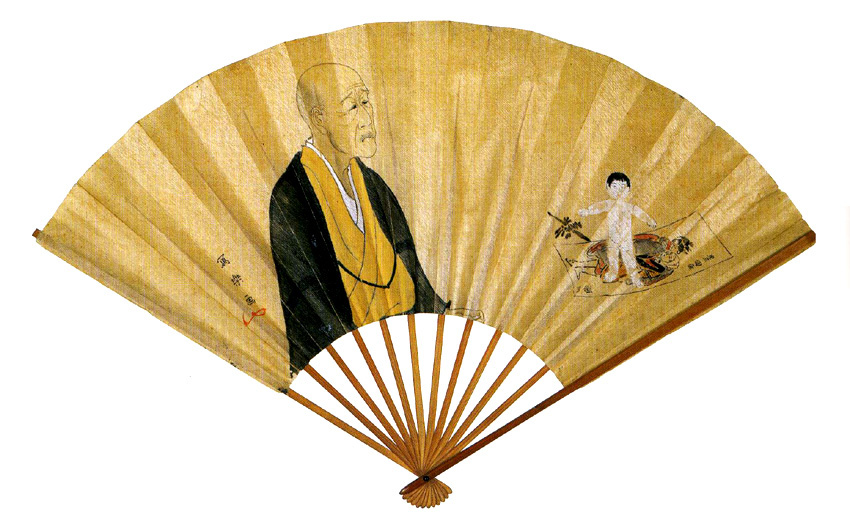

The sensu folding hand fan of an old man (扇面老人図 Senmen rōjin zu) is a nikuhitsu-ga painting on chikushi bamboo paper. To the left is a portrait of an old man, and to the right is a young boy standing on an actor portrait by Utagawa Toyokuni. The fan was in the collection of Handeishi Kawakita (1878–1963), which now is held by the Sekisui Museum.

==== Matsumoto Kōshiro IV as Kakogawa Honzō and Matsumoto Yonesaburō as Konami ====
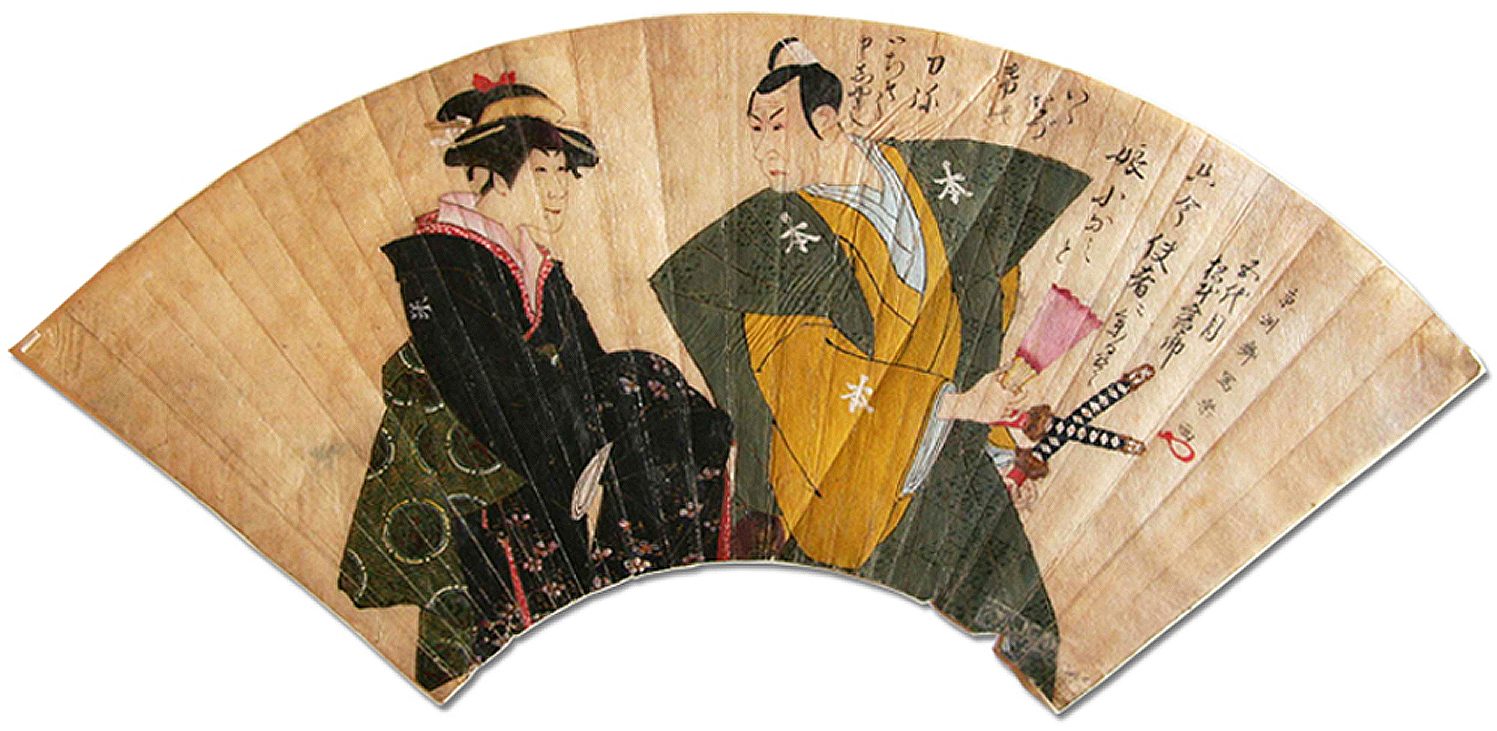

The sensu folding hand fan of Matsumoto Kōshiro IV as Kakogawa Honzō and Matsumoto Yonesaburō as Konami is in the collection of the Museum of Asian Art of Corfu.

The fan measures about 50 cm. It was identified and confirmed as a Sharaku work in 2008 and is believed to depict a scene from a May 1795 performance of Kanadehon Chūshingura. Rather than a print, the fan is a nikuhitsu-ga painting on chikushi bamboo paper. It is signed (not stamped) Tōshūsai Sharaku ga (東洲齊冩樂画).

== Hanshita-e ==
Preparing a print involved having the print designer produce an ink drawing, which was then transferred to thin Mino paper. The woodblock carver pasted this tracing, called a hanshita-e (版下絵), face-down onto the woodblock. The carver cut around the lines visible through the paper to make the key printing block.

=== Sumo hanshita-e ===
==== Tanikaze and Daidōzan ====
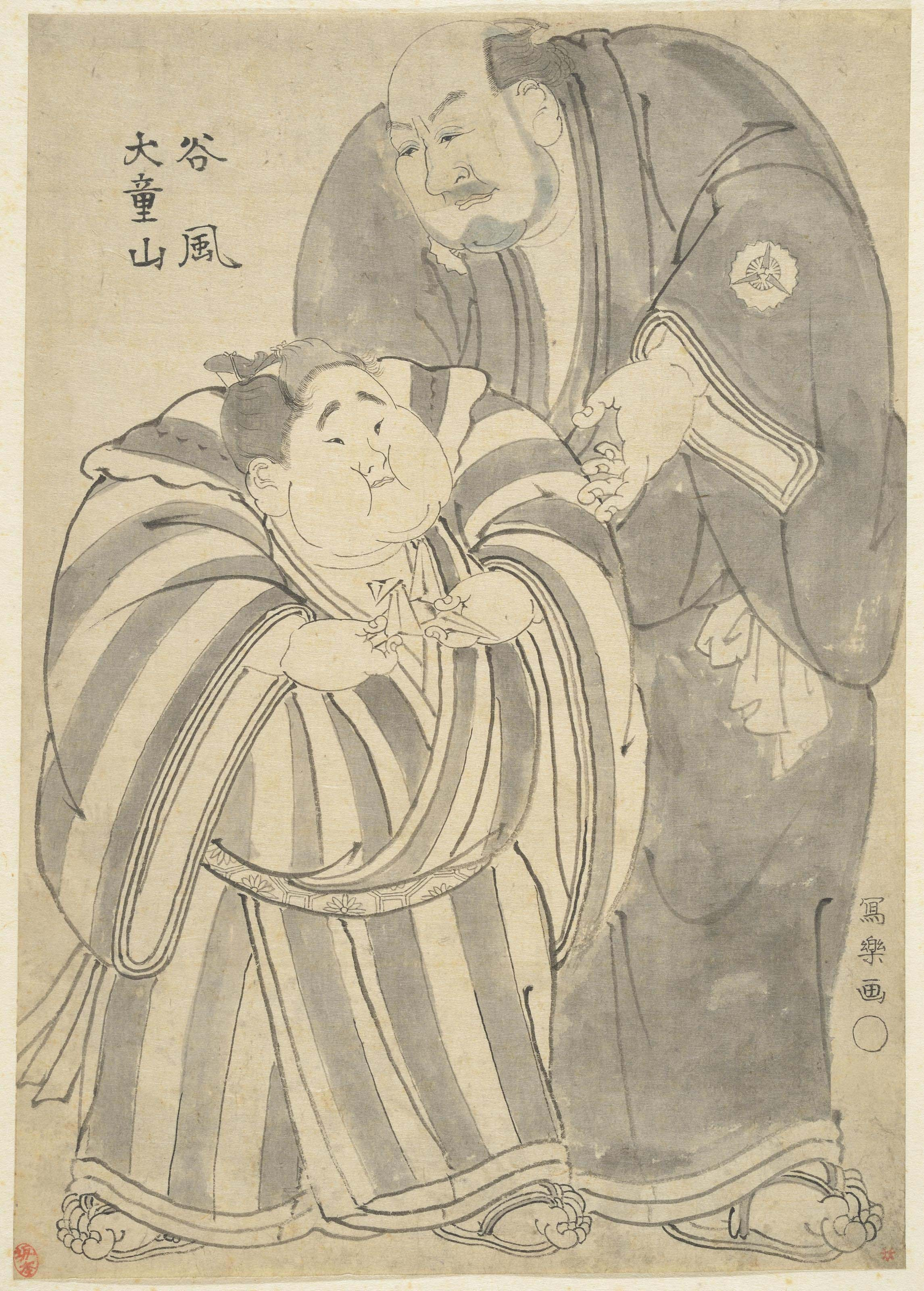
Hanshita-e of Tanikaze and Daidōzan

A hanshita-e in a private collection, depicting the sumo wrestlers Tanikaze and Daidōzan Bungorō.

At the turn of the 19th to 20th centuries, Kobayashi Bunshichi travelled abroad and amassed a collection of ukiyo-e. Amongst the items in his collection were seven hanshita-e sumo drawing signed Sharaku Ga (冩樂画). These were lost with the rest of Kobayashi's collection in a fire during the 1923 Great Kantō earthquake. This portrait of Tanikaze and Daidōzan is thought to be from the same series.

=== Actor hanshita-e ===
==== Onoe Matsusuke I and Ichikawa Ebizō I ====
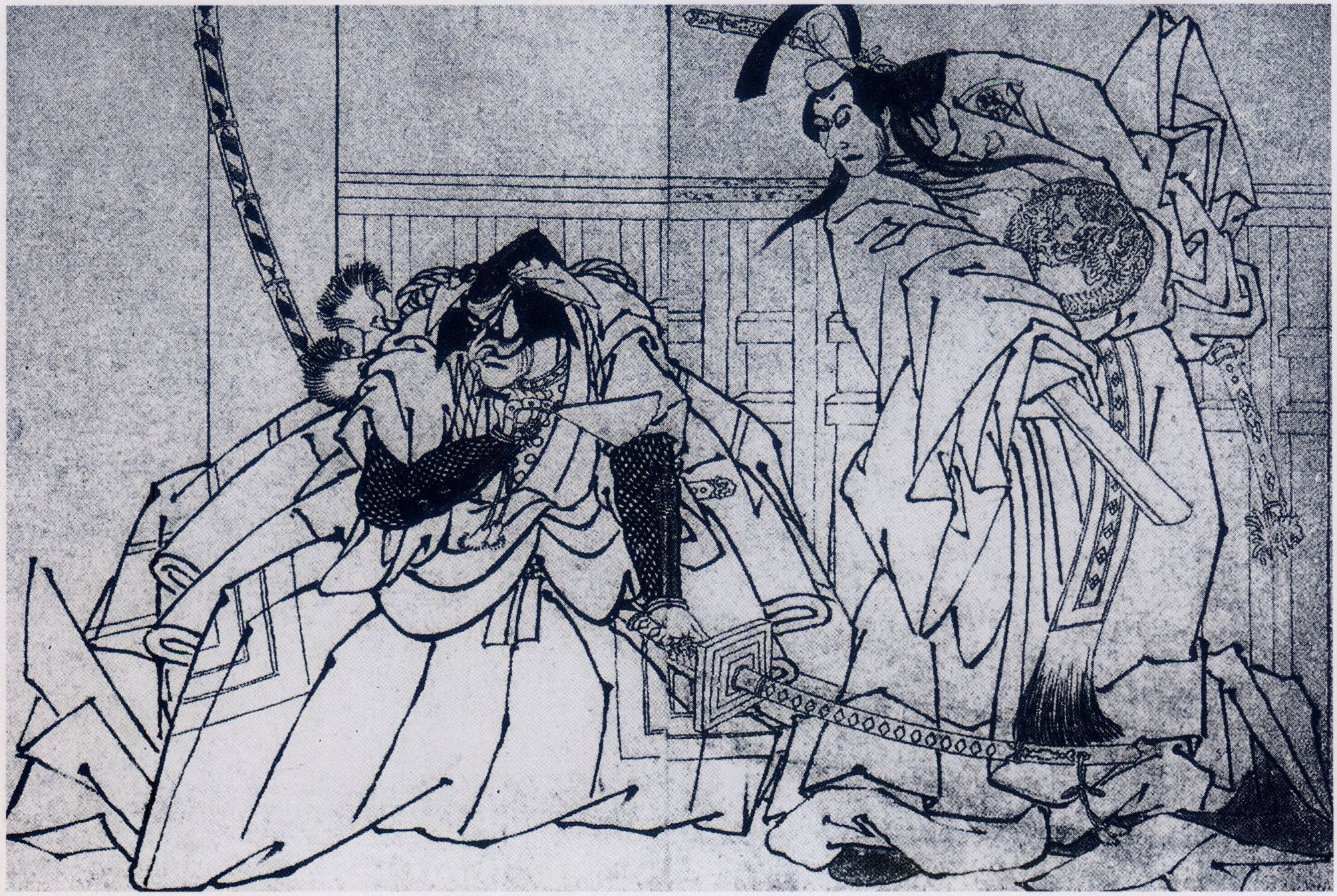

The whereabouts are unknown of the hanshita-e of Onoe Matsusuke I and Ichikawa Ebizō I (初世尾上松助・初世市川鰕蔵 Shosei Onoe Matsusuke, Shosei Ichikawa Ebizō).

==== Sanokawa Ichimatsu III, Sakata Hangorō III, and Ichikawa Tomizaemon I ====
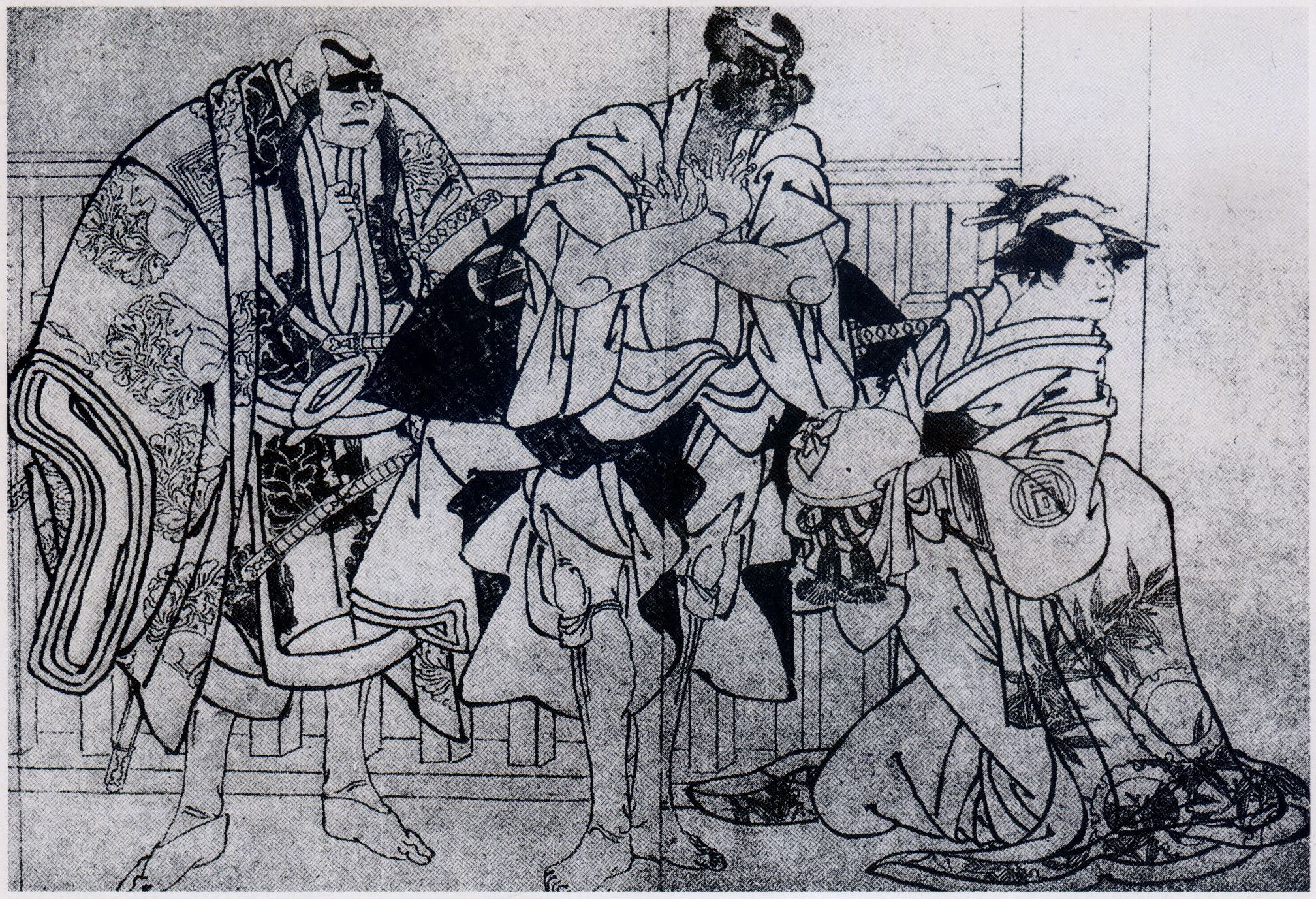

The whereabouts are unknown of the hanshita-e of Sansei Sanokawa Ichimatsu III, Sakata Hangorō III, and Ichikawa Tomizaemon I (三世佐野川市松・三世坂田半五郎・初世市川富左衛門 Sansei Sanokawa Ichimatsu, Sansei Sakata Hangorō, Shosei Ichikawa Tomizaemon).

==== Nakagawa Tomisaburō II, Ichikawa Omezō I, Ichikawa Komazō III ====
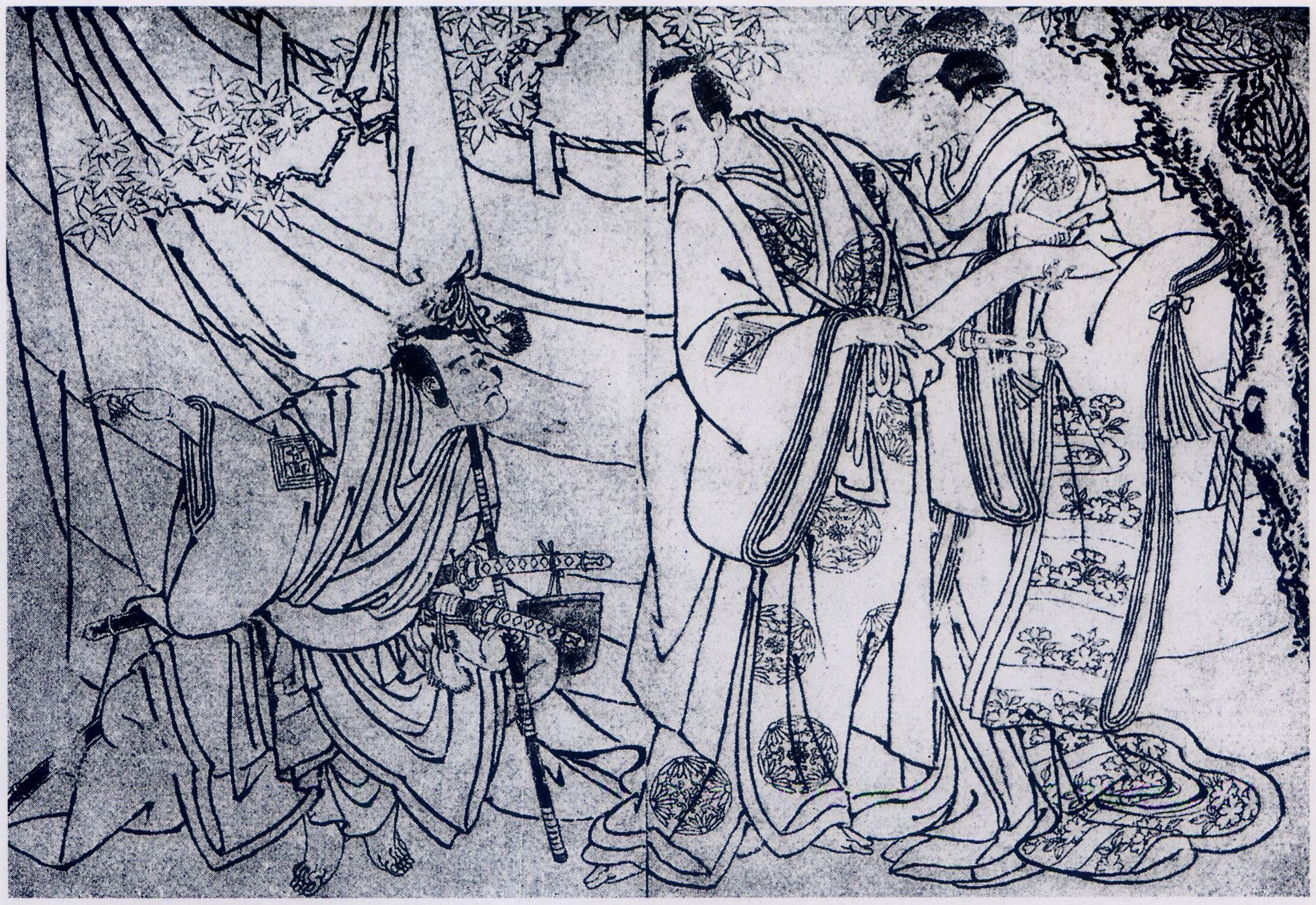

The hanshita-e of Segawa Tomisaburō II, Ichikawa Omezō I, Ichikawa Komazō III (二世中川富三郎・初世市川男女蔵・三世市川高麗蔵 Nisei Segawa Tomisaburō, Shosei Ichikawa Omezō, Sansei Ichikawa Komazō) is in a private collection.

==== Bandō Mitsugorō II, Ōtani Oniji III, and Segawa Kikunojō III ====
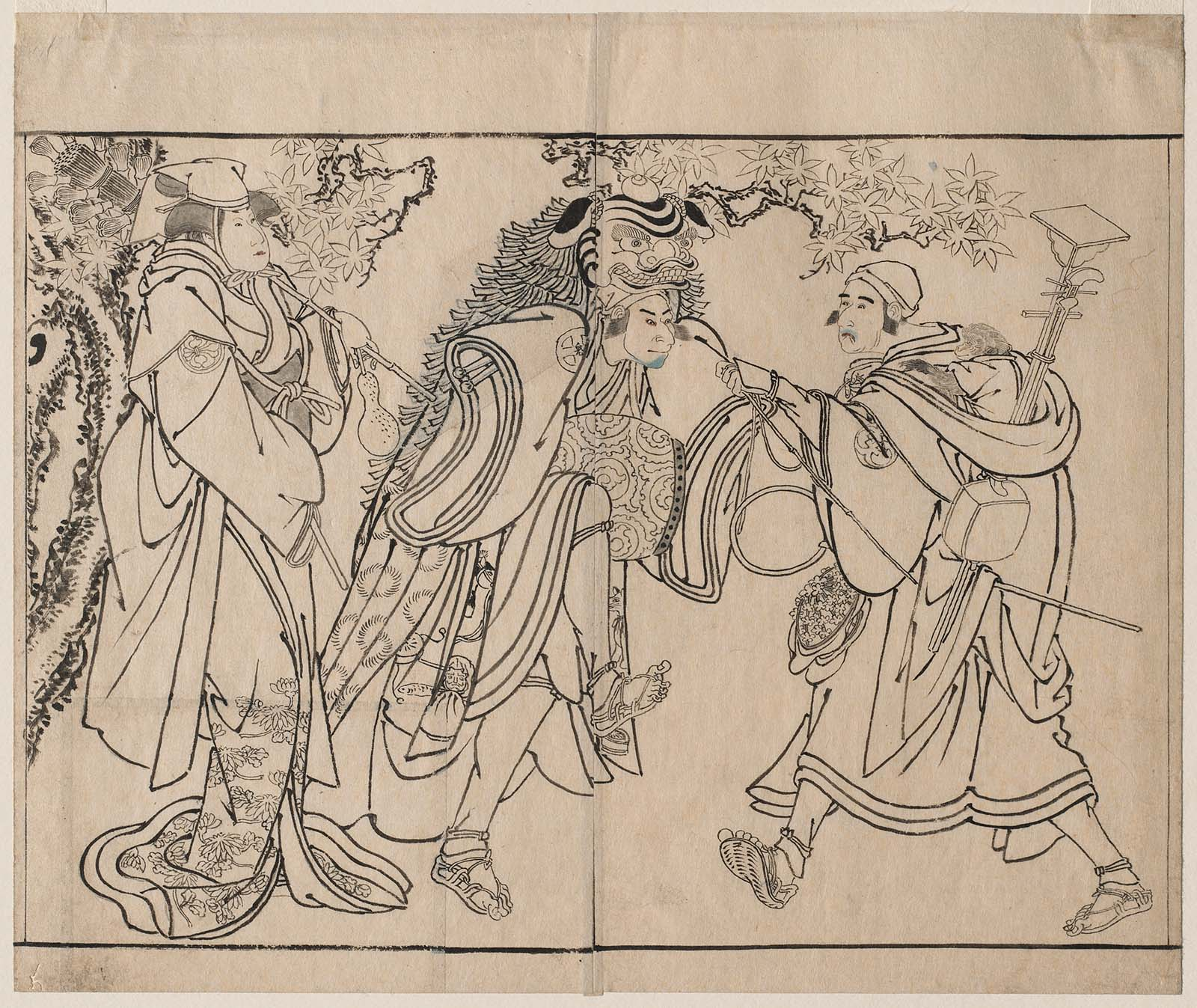
Bandō Mitsugorō II, Ōtani Oniji III, and Segawa Kikunojō III

A hanshita-e in the collection of the Museum of Fine Arts, Boston, depicts the actors Bandō Mitsugorō II, Ōtani Oniji III, and Segawa Kikunojō III.

==== Ichikawa Yaozō III, Sawamura Sōjūrō III, and Osagawa Tsuneyo II ====
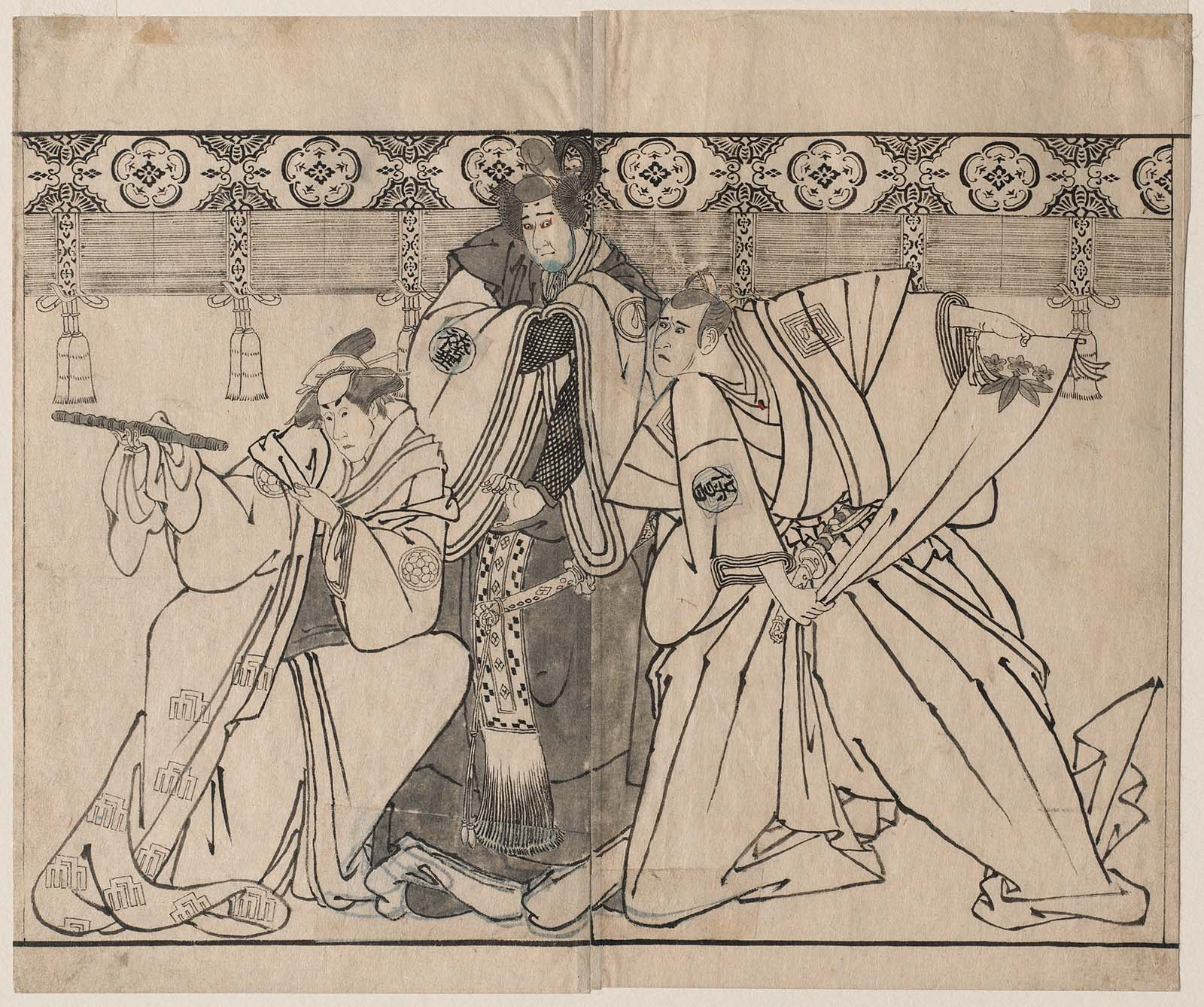
Ichikawa Yaozō III, Sawamura Sōjūrō III, and Osagawa Tsuneyo II

A hanshita-e in the collection of the Museum of Fine Arts, Boston, depicting the actors Ichikawa Yaozō III, Sawamura Sōjūrō III, and Osagawa Tsuneyo II.

==== Arashi Ryūzō II and Morita Kan'ya VIII ====
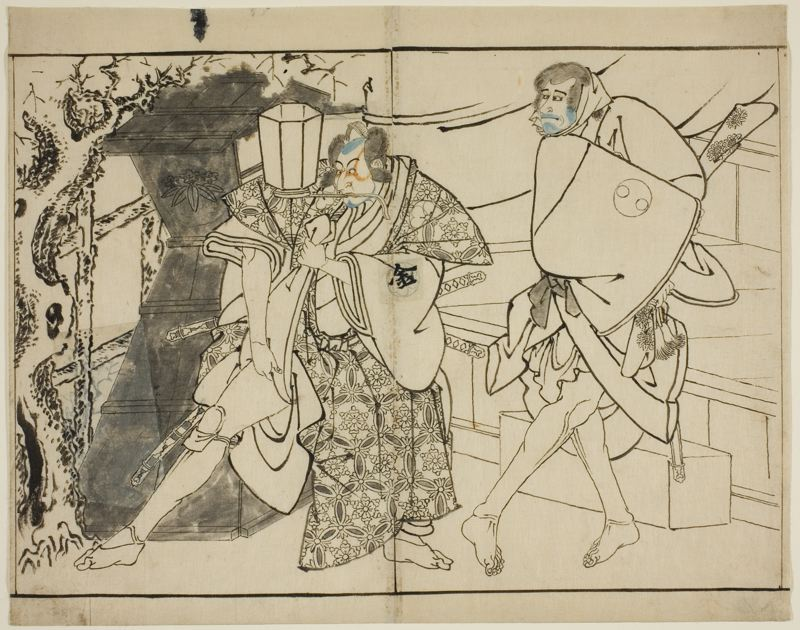

A hanshita-e in the collection of the Art Institute of Chicago, depicting the actors Arashi Ryūzō II and Morita Kan'ya VIII.

==== Iwai Kiyotarō I, Nakamura Sukegorō II, and Bandō Hikosaburō III ====
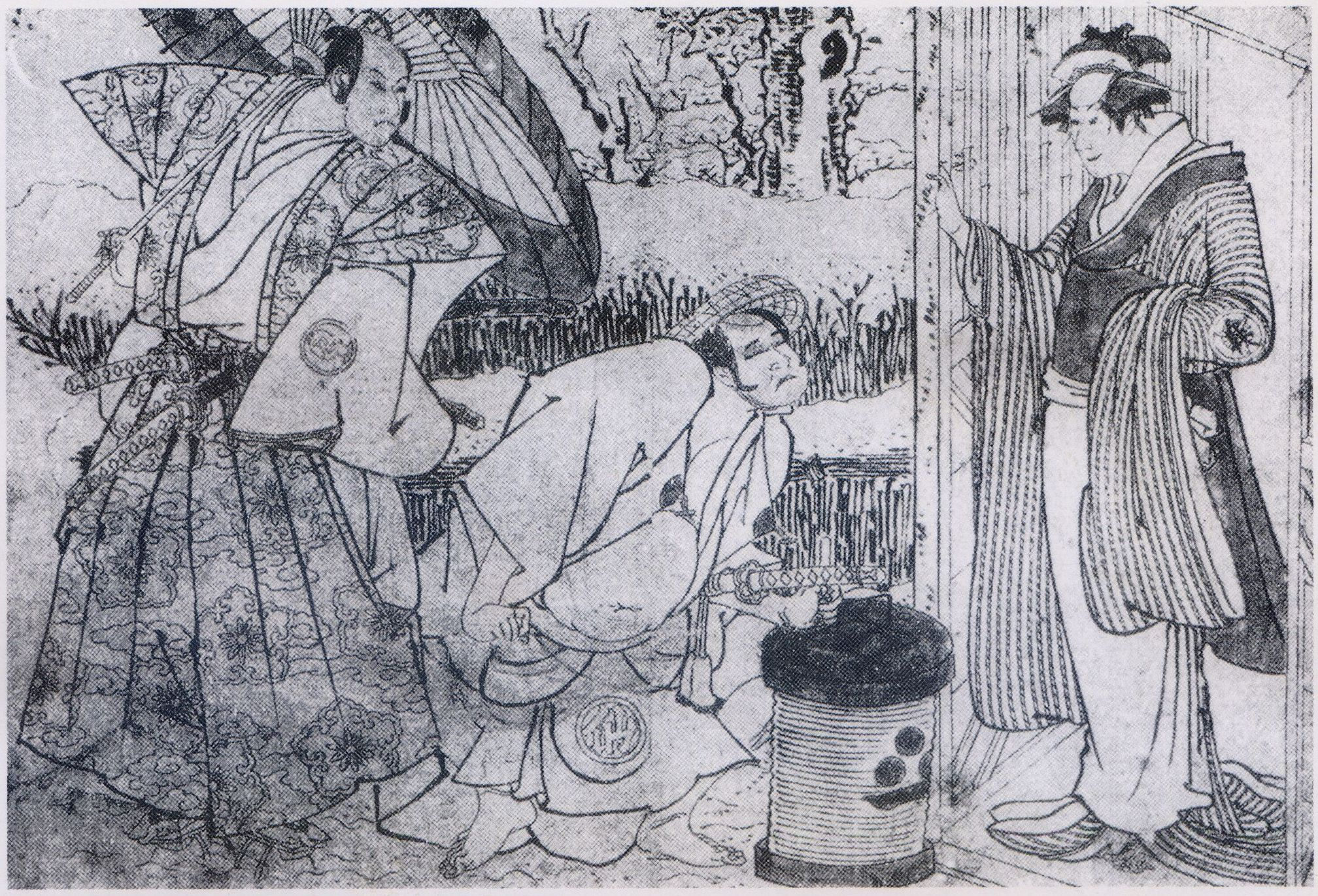

A hanshita-e in a private collection depicts Iwai Kiyotarō I, Nakamura Sukegorō II, and Bandō Hikosaburō III (初世岩井喜代太郎・二世中村助五郎・三世坂東彦三郎 Shosei Iwai Kiyotarō, Nisei Nakamura Sukegorō, Sansei Bandō Hikosaburō).

==== Ichikawa Monnosuke II, Matsumoto Kōshirō IV, and Iwai Hanshirō IV ====
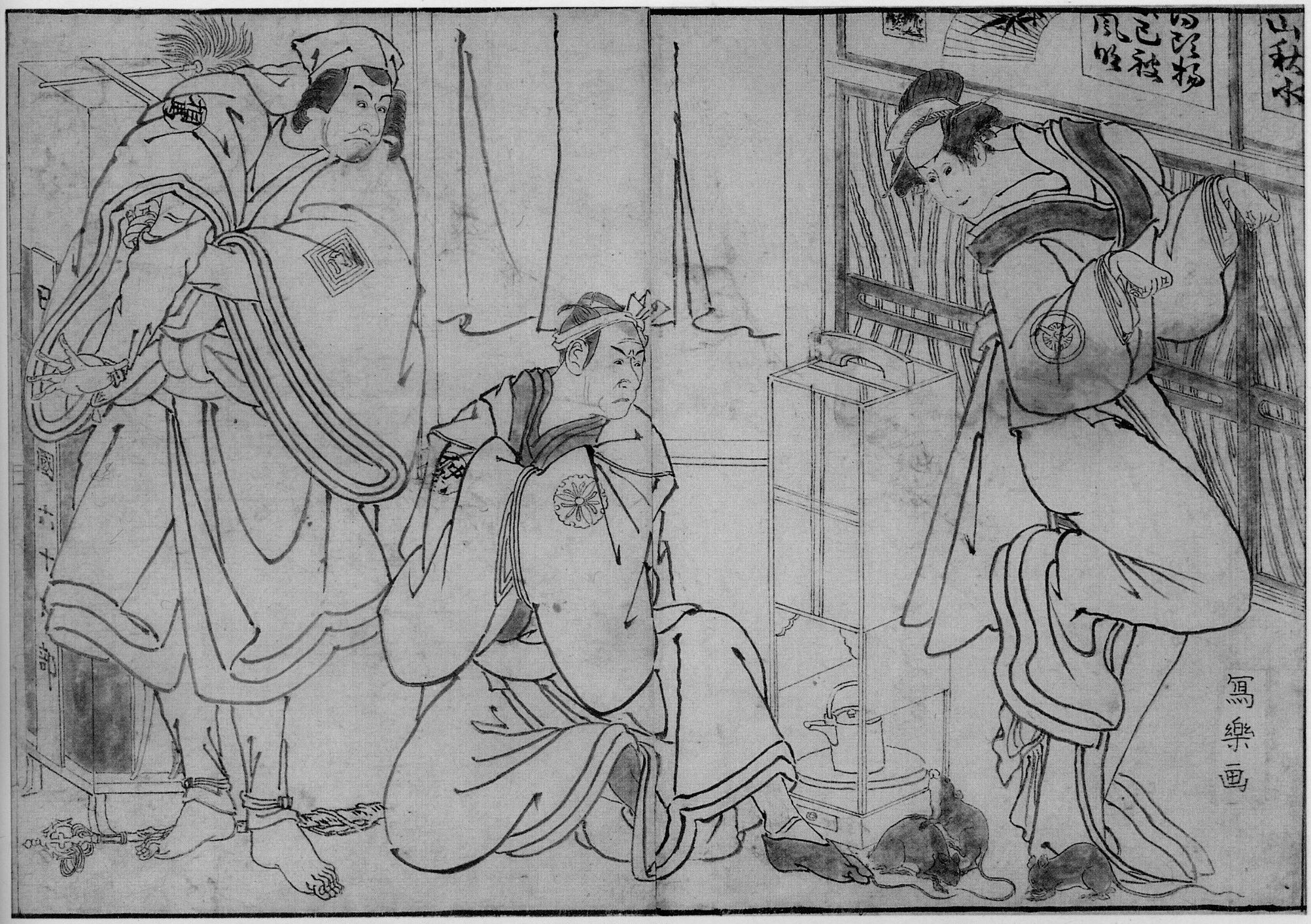

The Guimet Museum has a hanshita-e depicting Ichikawa Monnosuke II, Matsumoto Kōshirō IV, and Iwai Hanshirō IV (二世市川門之助・四代目松本幸四郎・四世岩井半四郎 Nisei Ichikawa Monnosuke, Yonsei Matsumoto Kōshirō, Yonsei Iwai Hanshirō).

==== Segawa Yūjirō II and Matsumoto Yonesaburō I ====
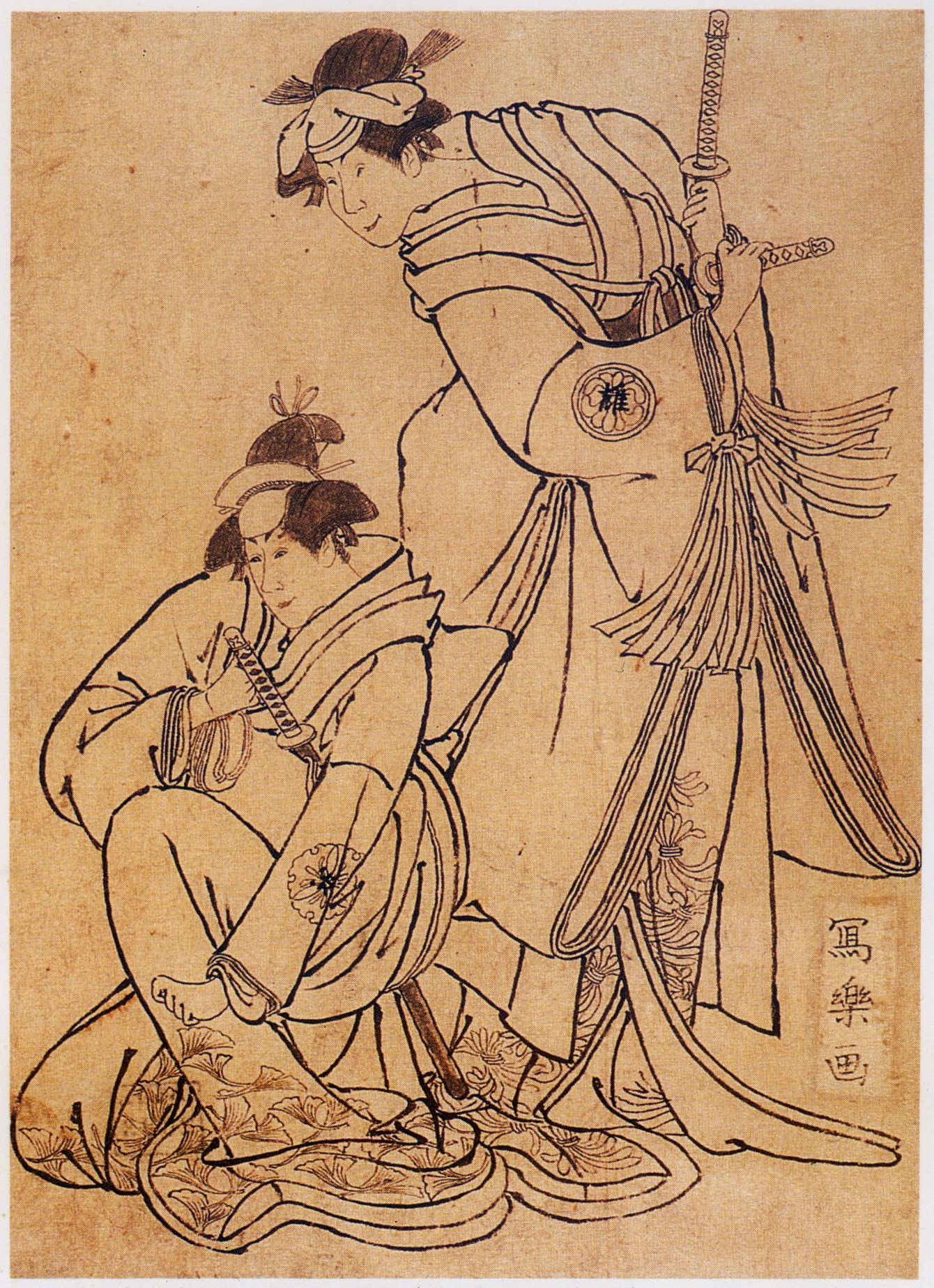

The Guimet Museum has a hanshita-e depicting Segawa Yūjirō II and Matsumoto Yonesaburō I (二世瀬川雄次郎・初世松本米三郎 Nisei Segawa Yūjirō, Shosei Matsumoto Yonesaburō).
