= Fujikawaguchiko =

Fujikawaguchiko 富士河口湖町
- Town
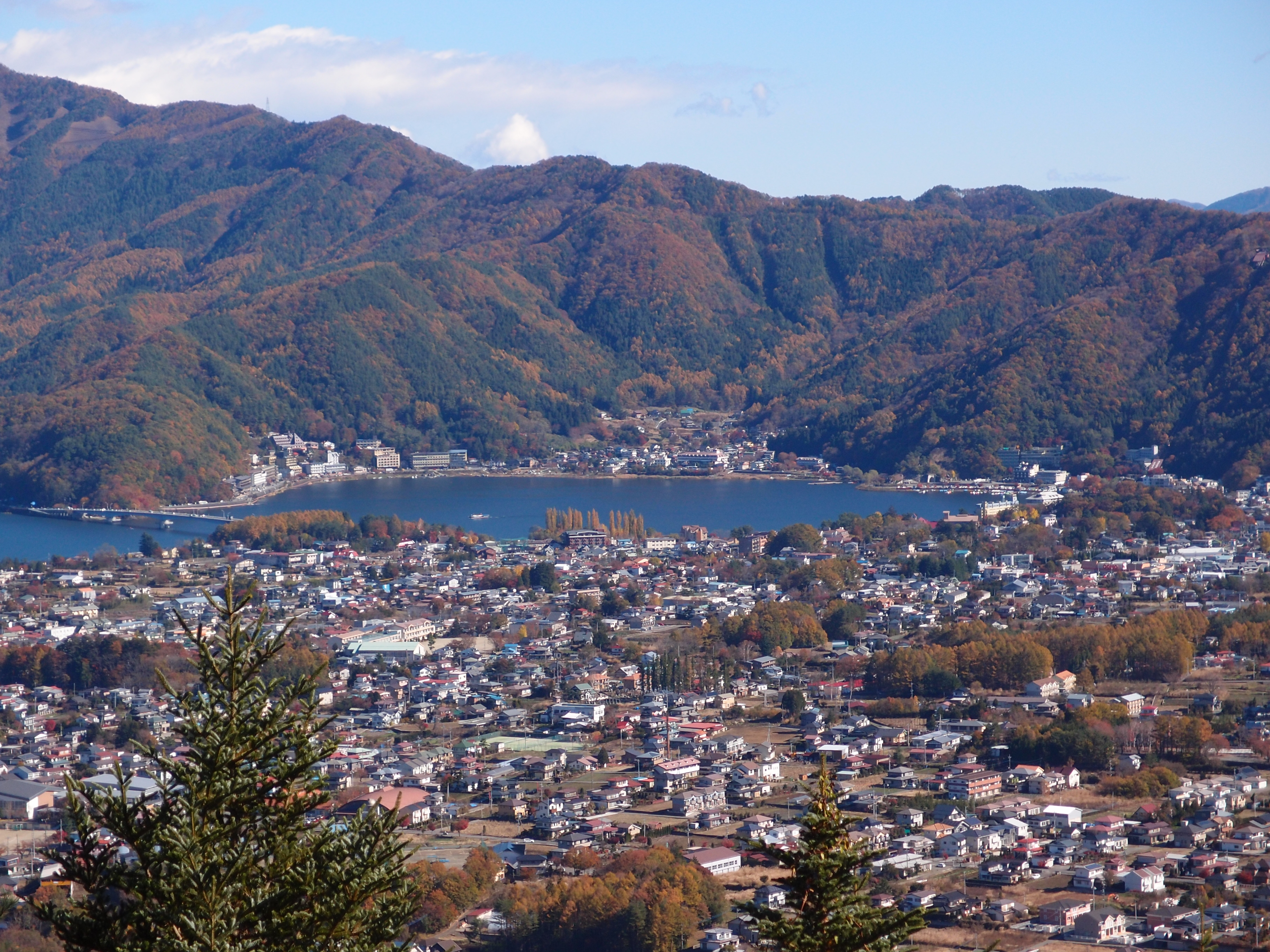
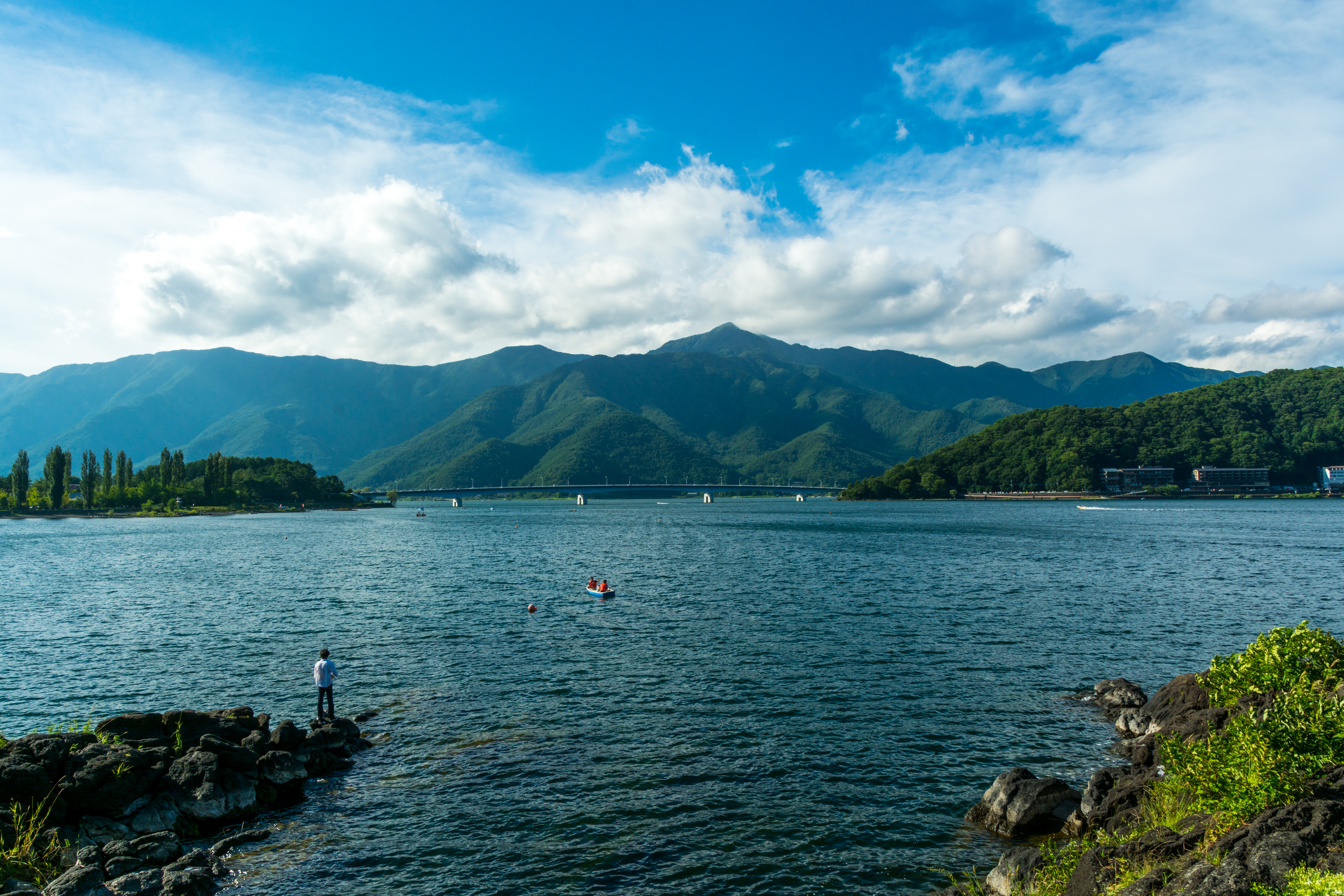
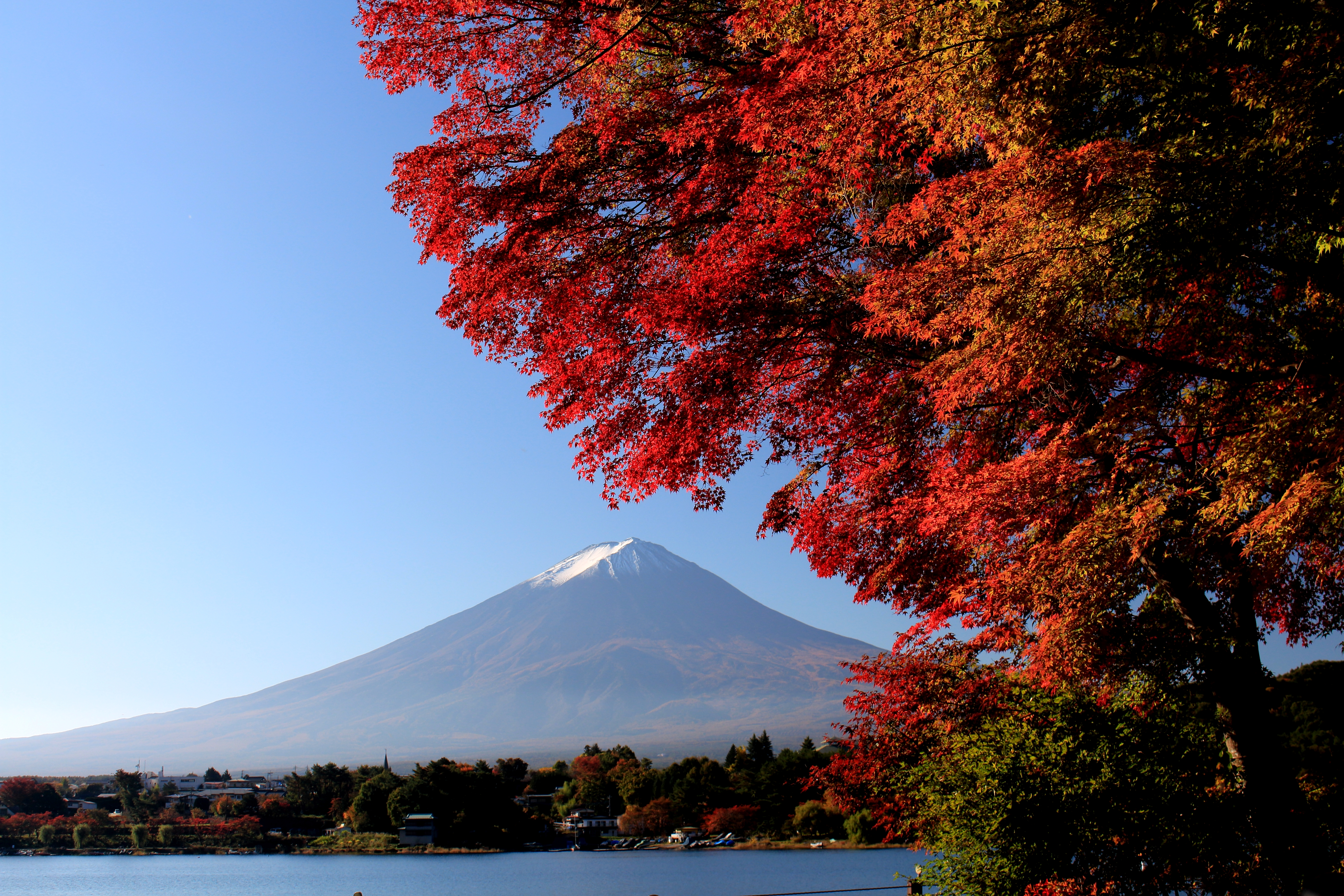
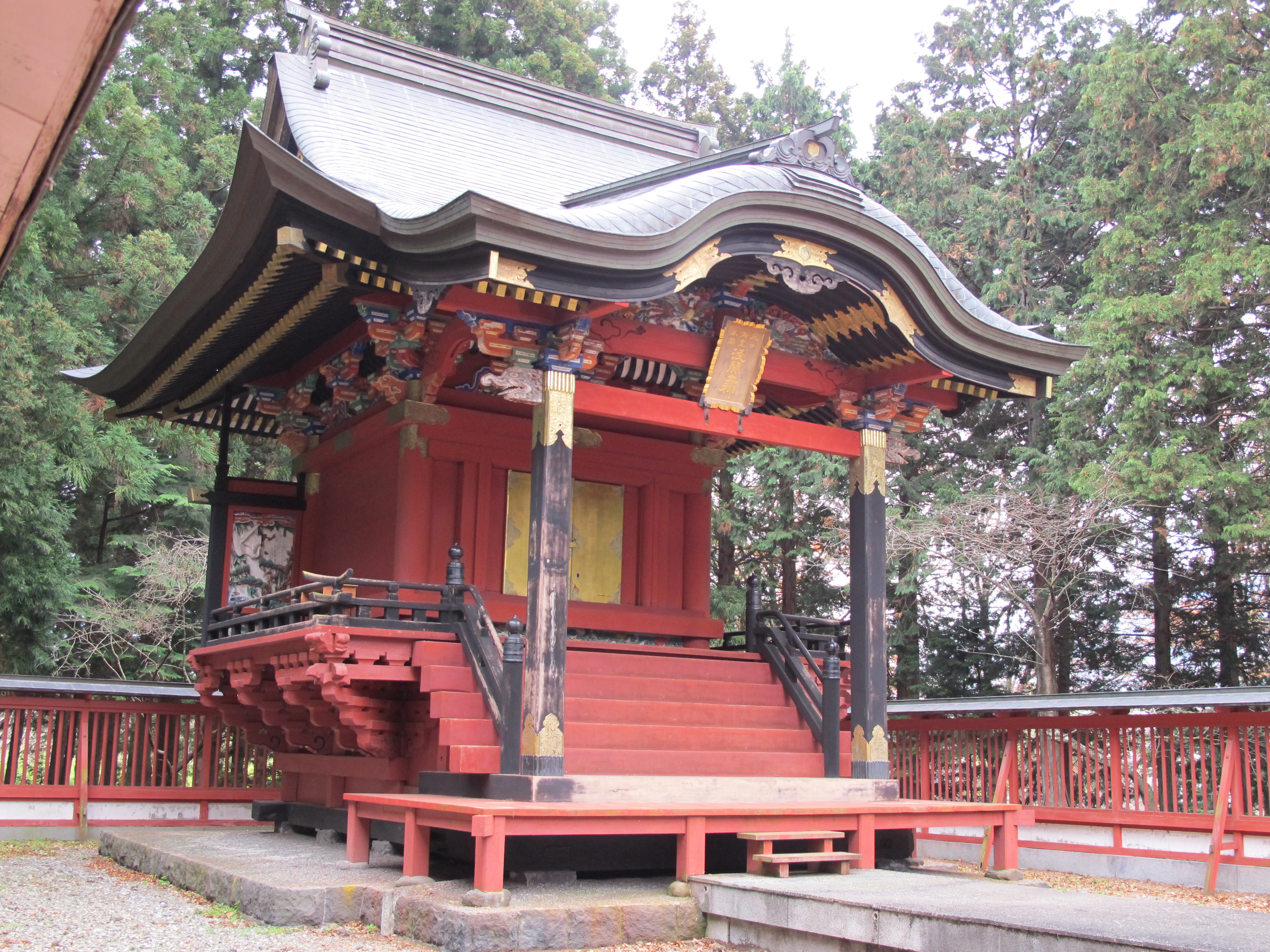
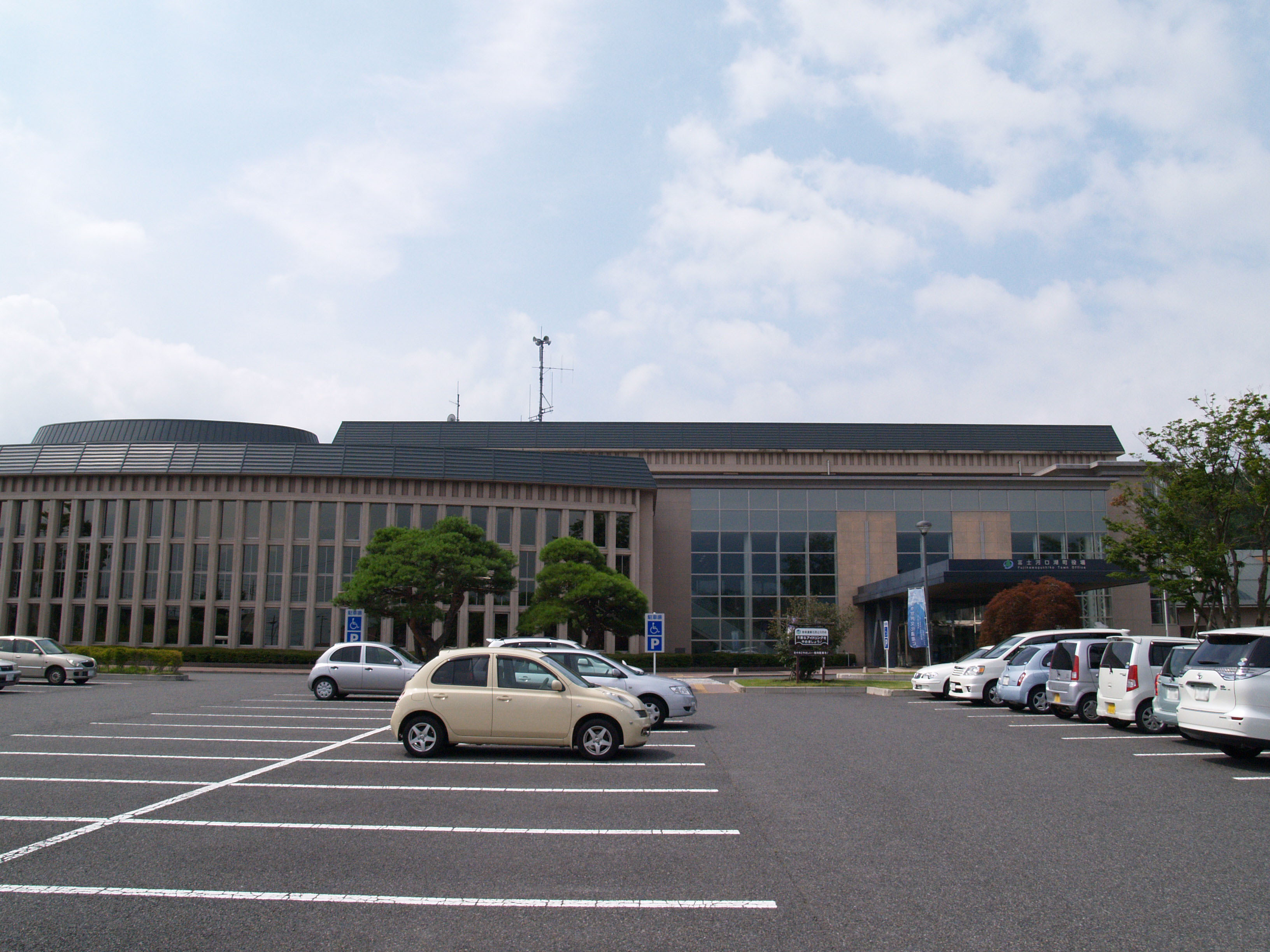
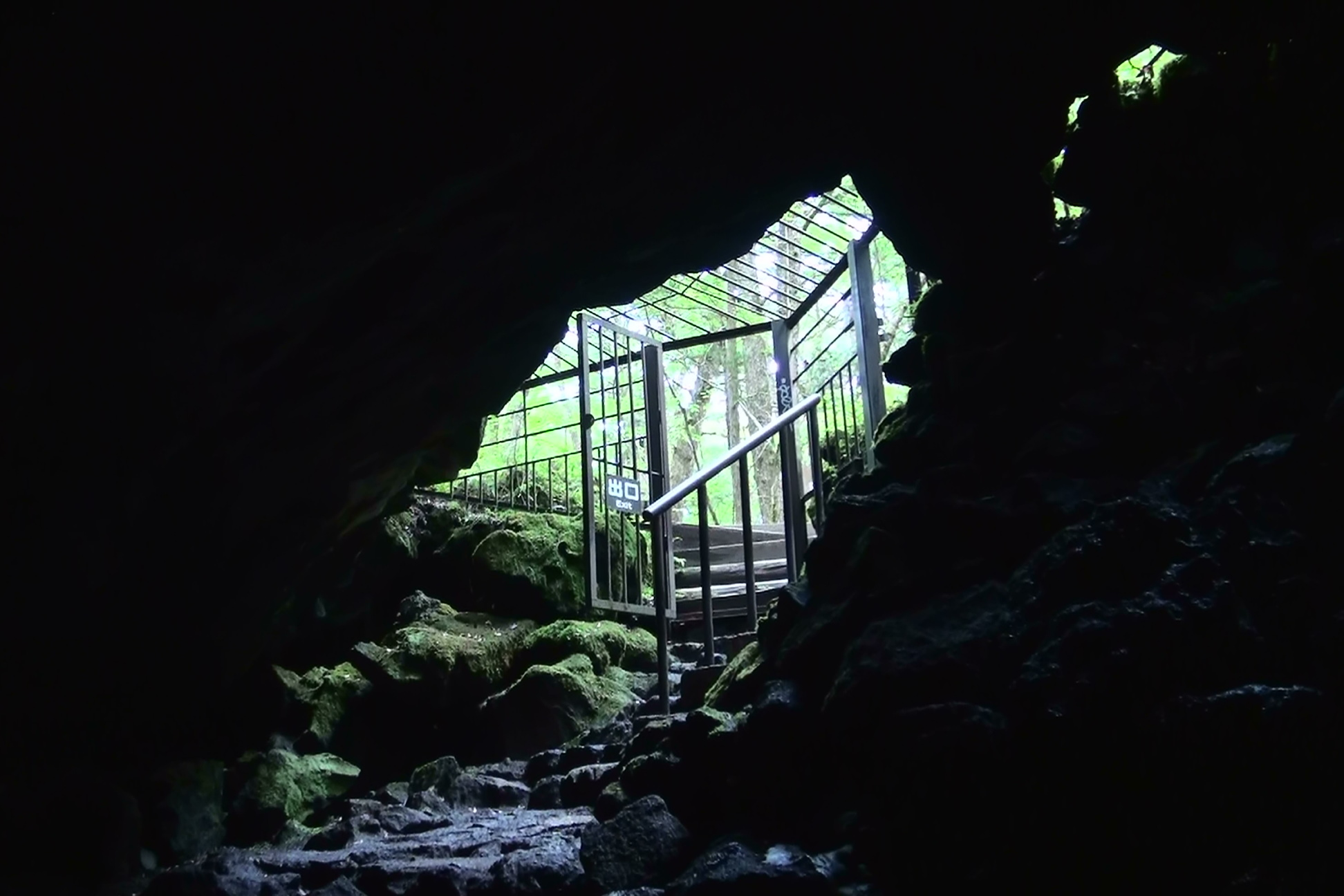
- Downtown Lake Kawaguchi Mount Fuji Fuji Omuro Sengen Shrine Town Hall Lake Sai Bat Cave

- Flag Seal

- Location of Fujikawaguchiko in Yamanashi Prefecture

- Coordinates: 35°29′50.1″N 138°45′17.8″E
- Country: Japan
- Region: Chūbu; Tōkai
- Prefecture: Yamanashi Prefecture
- District: Minamitsuru

Government
  - Mayor: Hideyuki Watanabe

Area
  - Total: 158.40 km^{2} (61.16 sq mi)

Population (June 1, 2019)
  - Total: 26,540
  - Density: 167.6/km^{2} (434.0/sq mi)
- Time zone: UTC+9 (Japan Standard Time)
- Phone number: 0555-72-1111
- Address: 1700 Funatsu, Fujikawaguchiko-machi Minimitsuru-gun, Yamanashi-ken 401-0392
- Climate: Cfa
- Website: Official website
- Symbols
- Bird: Varied tit
- Flower: Oenothera
- Tree: Japanese red pine

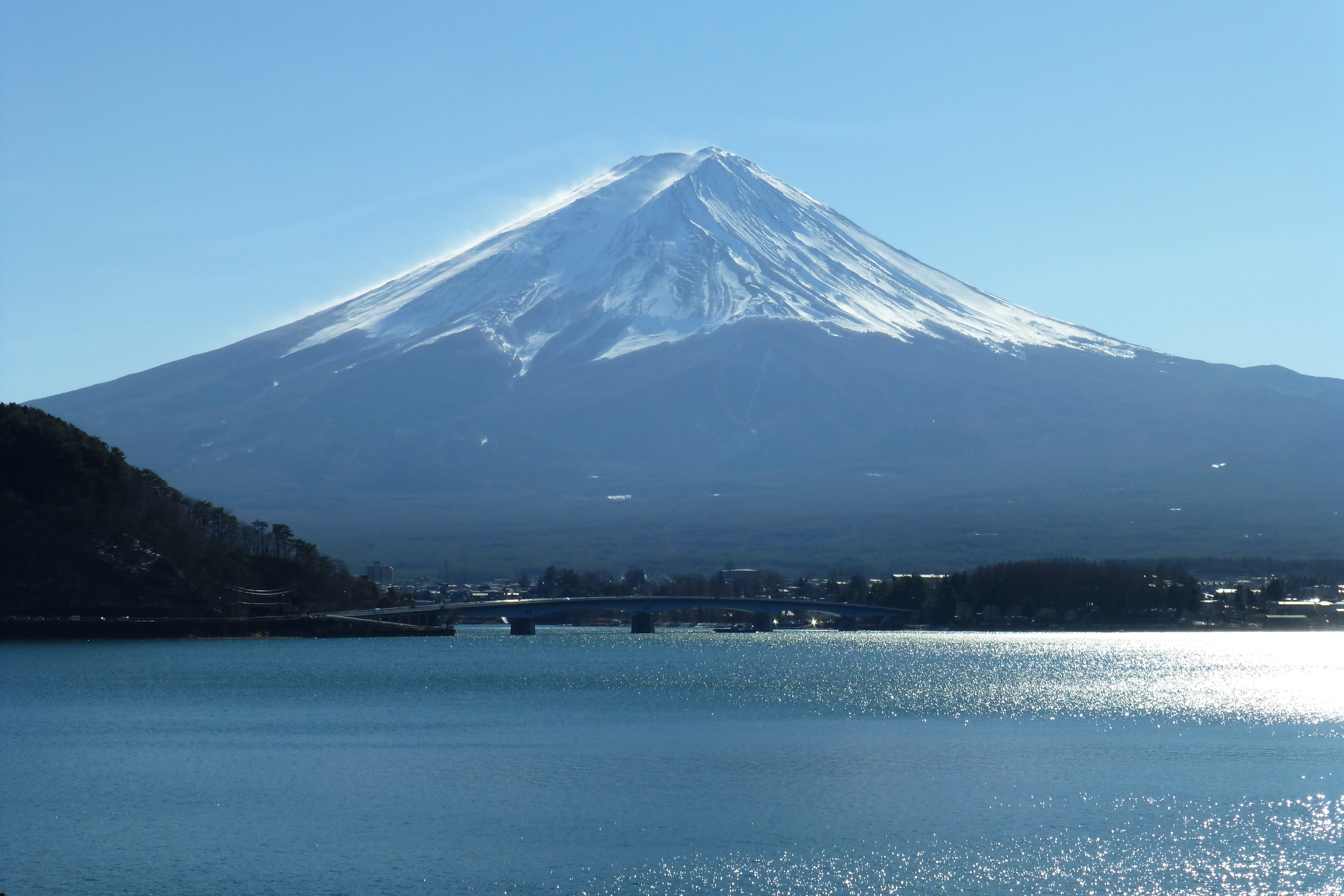
Mount Fuji as seen across Kawaguchiko

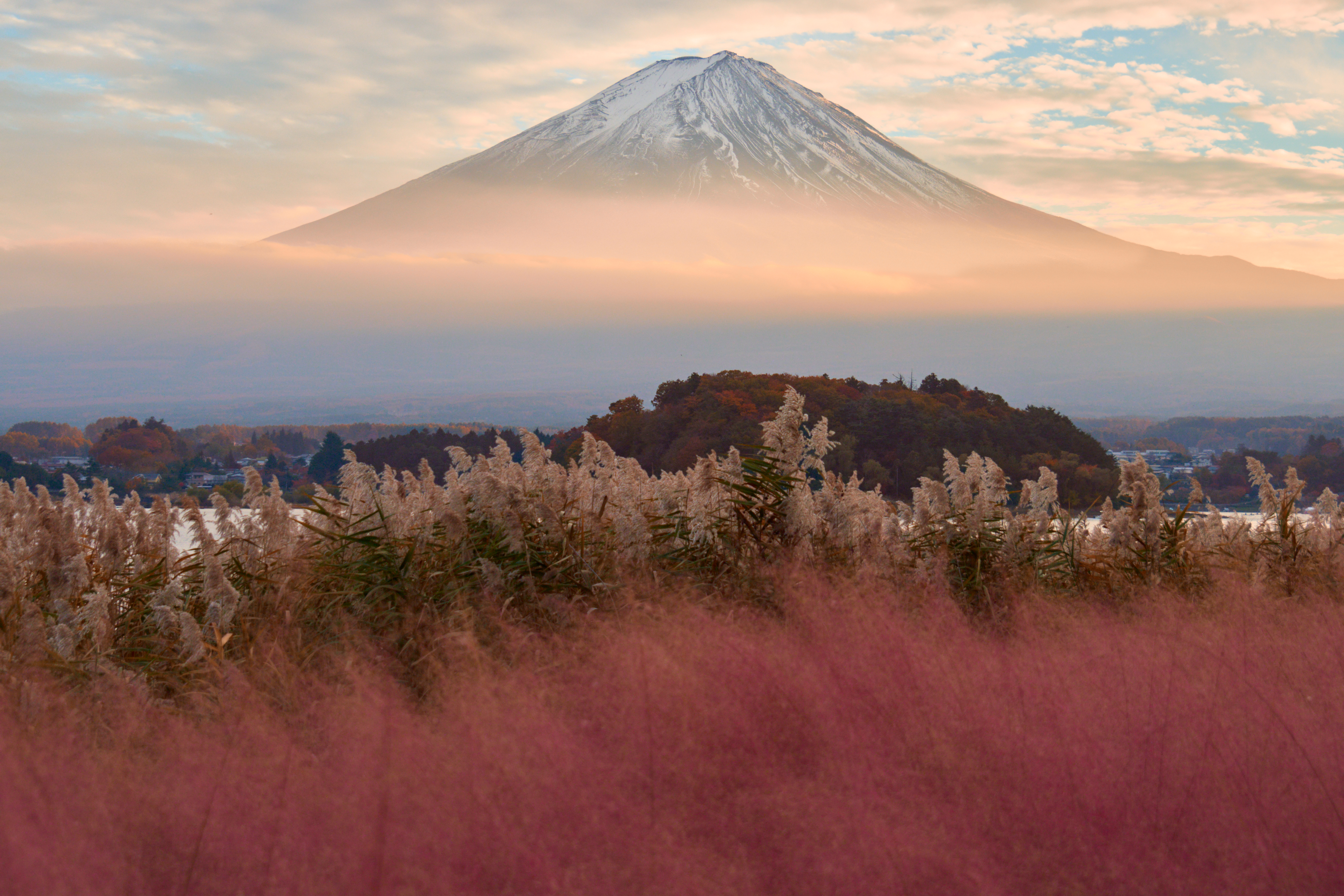
Mount Fuji in autumn from Oishi Park.

Fujikawaguchiko (富士河口湖町, Fujikawaguchiko-machi (Note: Japanese pronunciation: [ɸɯꜜ.ɟʑi | ka.wa.ɡɯ.tɕi̥ꜜ.ko, -ŋɯ.tɕi̥ꜜ-])) is a town located in Yamanashi Prefecture, Japan. As of 1 June 2019, the town had an estimated population of 26,542 in 10,618 households, and a population density of 170 persons per km^{2}. The total area of the town is 158.40 square kilometres (61.16 sq mi).

== Geography ==
Fujikawaguchiko is located in southern Yamanashi Prefecture, in the foothills of Mount Fuji. Three of the Fuji Five Lakes (Lake Kawaguchi, Lake Sai and Lake Shōji) are located in Fujikawaguchiko. Lake Motosu is shared with neighboring Minobu.

=== Neighboring municipalities ===
Shizuoka Prefecture:

- Fujinomiya

Yamanashi Prefecture:

- Fuefuki
- Fujiyoshida
- Kōfu
- Minobu
- Narusawa
- Nishikatsura
- Ōtsuki
- Tsuru

== Climate ==
Fujikawaguchiko features a humid continental climate (Köppen Dfa, bordering on Dfb) that closely borders on a humid subtropical climate (Köppen Cfa) and an oceanic climate (Köppen Cfb). The average annual temperature in Fujikawaguchiko is 10.3 °C. The average annual rainfall is 1663 mm with September as the wettest month.

Climate data for Kawaguchiko (1991–2020 normals, extremes 1933–present)
Month	Jan	Feb	Mar	Apr	May	Jun	Jul	Aug	Sep	Oct	Nov	Dec	Year
Record high °C (°F)	19.5 (67.1)	22.1 (71.8)	23.7 (74.7)	29.9 (85.8)	30.5 (86.9)	34.0 (93.2)	35.3 (95.5)	35.0 (95.0)	33.5 (92.3)	29.7 (85.5)	24.1 (75.4)	21.2 (70.2)	35.3 (95.5)
Mean daily maximum °C (°F)	5.5 (41.9)	6.6 (43.9)	10.5 (50.9)	16.1 (61.0)	20.6 (69.1)	23.0 (73.4)	27.2 (81.0)	28.1 (82.6)	23.8 (74.8)	18.3 (64.9)	13.8 (56.8)	8.5 (47.3)	16.8 (62.2)
Daily mean °C (°F)	−0.4 (31.3)	0.6 (33.1)	4.2 (39.6)	9.5 (49.1)	14.3 (57.7)	17.8 (64.0)	21.9 (71.4)	22.5 (72.5)	18.7 (65.7)	13.0 (55.4)	7.5 (45.5)	2.3 (36.1)	11.0 (51.8)
Mean daily minimum °C (°F)	−5.7 (21.7)	−4.8 (23.4)	−1.3 (29.7)	3.7 (38.7)	8.9 (48.0)	13.7 (56.7)	18.0 (64.4)	18.5 (65.3)	14.8 (58.6)	8.7 (47.7)	2.2 (36.0)	−2.9 (26.8)	6.1 (43.0)
Record low °C (°F)	−22.1 (−7.8)	−20.5 (−4.9)	−18.1 (−0.6)	−9.1 (15.6)	−3.0 (26.6)	3.5 (38.3)	4.2 (39.6)	9.3 (48.7)	2.3 (36.1)	−3.3 (26.1)	−9.5 (14.9)	−15.5 (4.1)	−22.1 (−7.8)
Average precipitation mm (inches)	60.9 (2.40)	55.4 (2.18)	107.6 (4.24)	106.1 (4.18)	123.2 (4.85)	157.1 (6.19)	178.4 (7.02)	176.8 (6.96)	264.7 (10.42)	230.0 (9.06)	76.0 (2.99)	49.8 (1.96)	1,585.9 (62.44)
Average snowfall cm (inches)	37 (15)	28 (11)	20 (7.9)	4 (1.6)	0 (0)	0 (0)	0 (0)	0 (0)	0 (0)	0 (0)	1 (0.4)	7 (2.8)	97 (38)
Average precipitation days (≥ 0.5 mm)	5.8	6.1	10.4	9.9	10.8	13.3	13.3	11.3	12.4	11.4	7.8	5.3	117.8
Average snowy days	8.8	9.9	9.4	2.3	0.0	0.0	0.0	0.0	0.0	0.0	0.6	5.1	36.7
Average relative humidity (%)	62	63	67	68	73	80	81	81	82	81	74	66	73
Mean monthly sunshine hours	212.3	190.7	185.7	185.5	181.0	122.8	148.4	165.2	122.5	134.4	165.8	199.9	2,014.2
Source: Japan Meteorological Agency (normals: 1991–2020, extremes: 1933–present)

== Demographics ==
Per Japanese census data, the population of Fujikawaguchiko grown slightly in recent decades.

Historical population
Year	Pop.	±%
2000	23,824	—
2010	25,471	+6.9%
2020	26,082	+2.4%

== History ==
The area around Lake Kawaguchi has been inhabited since at least the Jōmon period. It was on the road connecting Kai Province with Suruga Province, and is mentioned in Heian period records, which also document an eruption of Mount Fuji in 864 AD. During the Edo period, all of Kai Province was tenryō territory under direct control of the Tokugawa shogunate. During the cadastral reform of the early Meiji period on July 1, 1889, the area came under the jurisdiction of Minamitsuru District, Yamanashi Prefecture.

On 15 November 2003, the town of Kawaguchiko, and the villages of Katsuyama and Ashiwada merged to form the new town of Fujikawaguchiko. The headquarters of the infamous Aum Shinrikyo was located in the village of Kamikuishiki, most of which was absorbed into Fujikawaguchiko on 1 March 2006.

In May 2024, Fujikawaguchiko erected a large black barrier to block the iconic view of Mount Fuji due to a surge in tourists drawn by the town's popularity on social media platforms like Instagram. Installed on May 21, this measure followed complaints of disruptive behavior from tourists, including harassment of locals, littering, and trespassing. Even businesses unrelated to tourism, such as a dental clinic, had been affected, prompting them to seek intervention from local authorities. Unlike specific attractions, Fujikawaguchiko's issue stems from a viewpoint favored for capturing Mount Fuji, located in front of a convenience store. Most visitors opt for day trips, contributing to traffic congestion and environmental damage without significant financial benefits to the town.

== Education ==
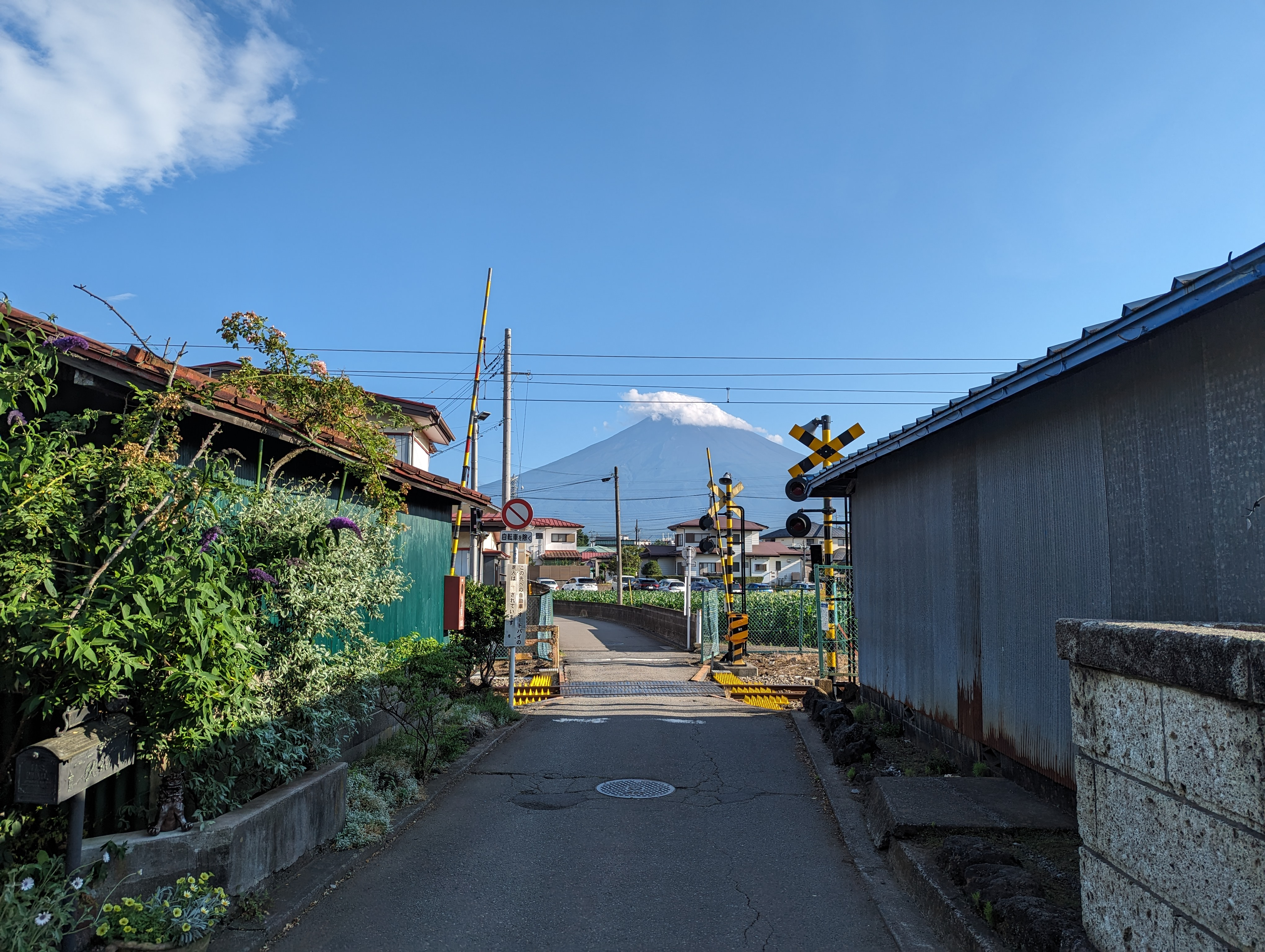
Another view of Mt. Fuji across the Fujikyu Railway tracks

Fujikawaguchiko has eight public elementary schools and two public junior high schools operated by the town government, along with one private elementary school and one private junior high school. The town has one public high school operated by the Yamanashi Prefectural Board of Education. The Health Science University, a private medical school, is located in Fujikawaguchiko.

== Transportation ==
=== Railway ===
- Fujikyuko Line
  - Fujikyu-Highland -Kawaguchiko.

=== Highway ===
- Chūō Expressway
- National Route 137
- National Route 139
- National Route 300
- National Route 358

== Local attractions ==
- The toy museum of Teruhisa Kitahara
- Fuji Five Lakes
- The sound of wild birds at Lake Sai was designated as one of the 100 Soundscapes of Japan by the Ministry of the Environment
