= Lake Motosu =

Lake in Fujikawaguchiko, Chūbu region, Japan

Lake Motosu Motosu-ko 本栖湖,
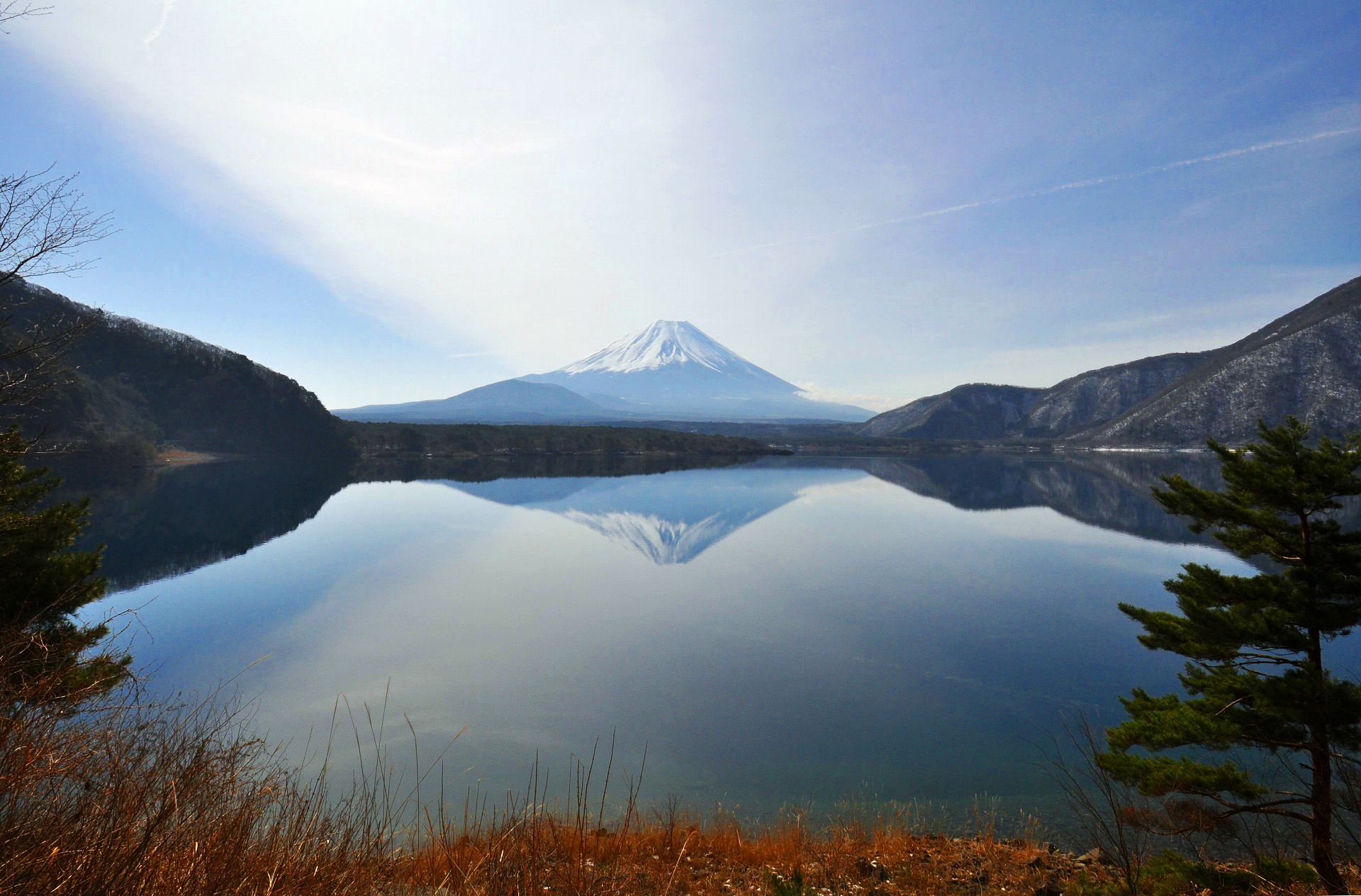
- With Mount Fuji

- Location within Japan Location within Yamanashi Prefecture
- Location: Fujikawaguchiko, Minobu, Yamanashi, Japan
- Coordinates: 35°27′50″N 138°35′08″E
- Primary outflows: none
- Basin countries: Japan
- Surface area: 4.7 km^{2} (1.8 sq mi)
- Average depth: 67.3 m (221 ft)
- Max. depth: 121.6 m (399 ft)
- Water volume: 0.316 km^{3} (256,000 acre⋅ft)
- Shore length^{1}: 11.82 km (7.34 mi)
- Surface elevation: 900 m (3,000 ft)
- ^{1} Shore length is not a well-defined measure.

Lake Motosu (本栖湖, Motosu-ko) is the westernmost of the Fuji Five Lakes and located on the border of the towns of Fujikawaguchiko and Minobu in southern Yamanashi Prefecture near Mount Fuji, Japan.

Lake Motosu is the third-largest of the Fuji Five Lakes in terms of surface area, and is the deepest, with a maximum water depth of 121.6 metres (399 feet), making it the ninth-deepest lake in Japan. Its surface elevation of 900 metres (3,000 feet) is the same as for Lake Shōji and Lake Sai, confirming that these three lakes were originally a single lake, which was divided by an enormous lava flow from Mount Fuji. The remnants of the lava flow are now under the Aokigahara Jukai Forest, and there is evidence to indicate that these three lakes remain connected by underground waterways. The temperature of the water never drops below 4 °C (39 °F), making it the only one of the Fuji Five Lakes that does not freeze in winter.

The lake is within the borders of the Fuji-Hakone-Izu National Park.

As with the other Fuji Five Lakes, the area is a popular resort, with many lakeside hotels, windsurfing facilities, camp sites, and excursion boats. Rainbow trout and brown trout were introduced to the lake in the Meiji period, and sports fishing is also popular. However, in recent years, reduced water transparency due to pollution from these activities has been a growing issue.

The lake and its view of Mount Fuji were featured on Series D of the Japanese 5000-yen note and Series E of the Japanese 1000-yen note.

== In popular culture ==
- In Inuyasha the Movie: The Castle Beyond the Looking Glass, in the Sengoku period, the lake has a mountain castle led by a daiyōkai Princess Kaguya, as according to Akitoki Hōjō that a saying a priest told his family once that the castle in the lake is "unreachable by mortals", and Inuyasha's Robe of the Fire-rat as fire is in this lake to undo Monk Miyatsu's seal to free Kaguya out of Mirror of Life.
- Lake Motosu features prominently in the anime series Laid-Back Camp. Visitor numbers rose after the first season aired.
- In the first volume of 1Q84 of Haruki Murakmi, it is the scene of a confrontation between the extremists of the “Dawn” sect and the Japanese police.

== Gallery ==
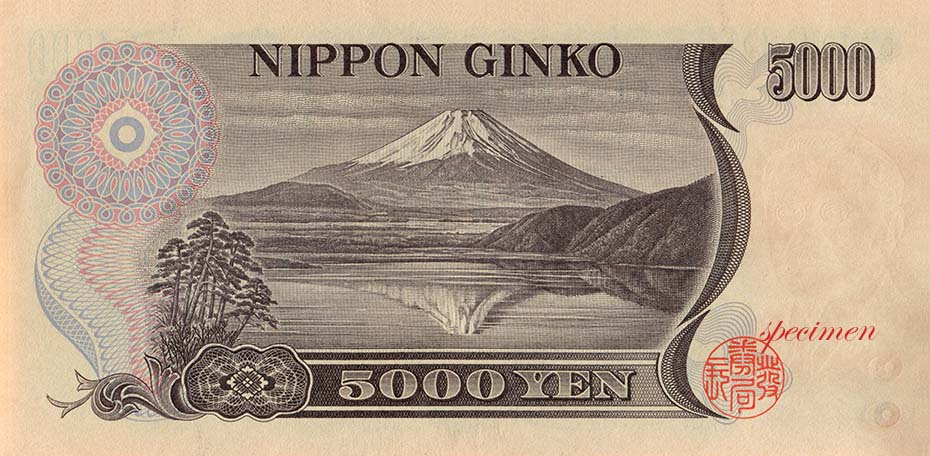
Reverse side of former 5000-yen banknote

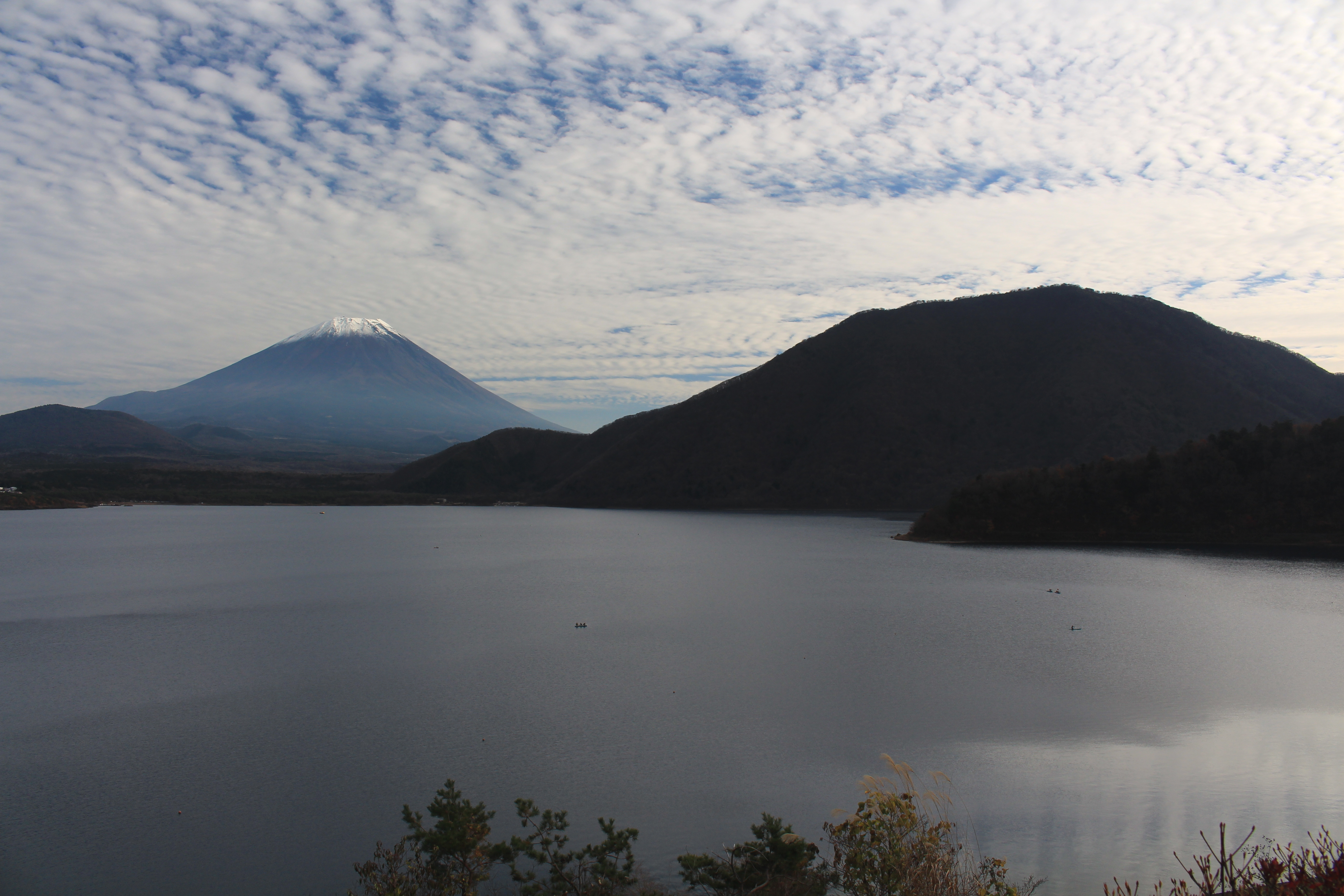
Mount Fuji and Mount Ryu

A sunny day beside the lake

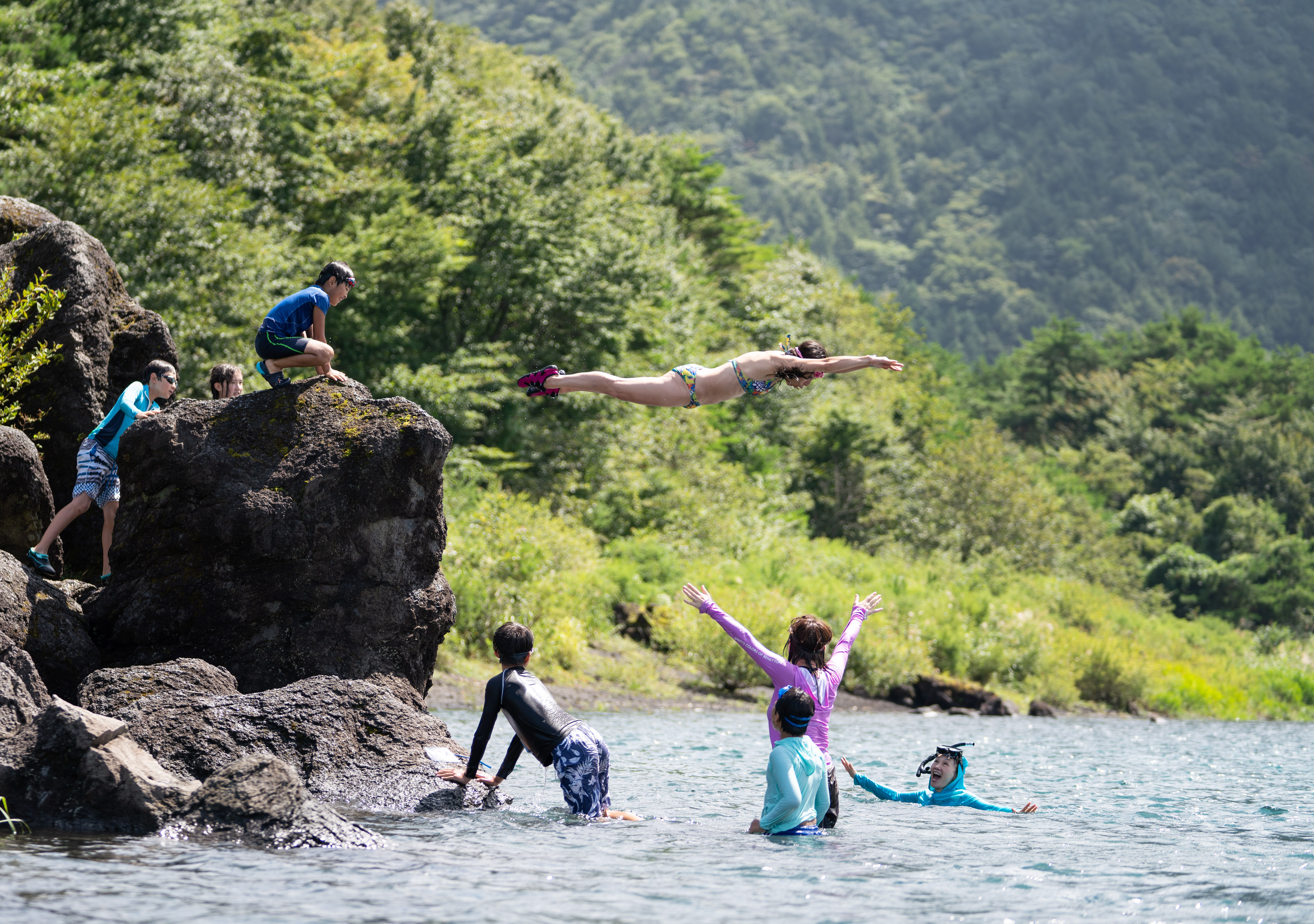
Recreational activities at the lake

== See also ==
- Fuji Five Lakes
- Fuji-Hakone-Izu National Park

== General and cited references ==
- Rafferty, John P., ed. (2010). Plate Tectonics, Volcanoes, and Earthquakes. New York: Britannica Educational Pub. in association with Rosen Educational Services. ISBN 978-1615301065. OCLC 656826006.
