= Lake Shōji =

Lake in Fuji-Hakone-Izu National Park, Japan

Lake Shōji Shōji-ko 精進湖
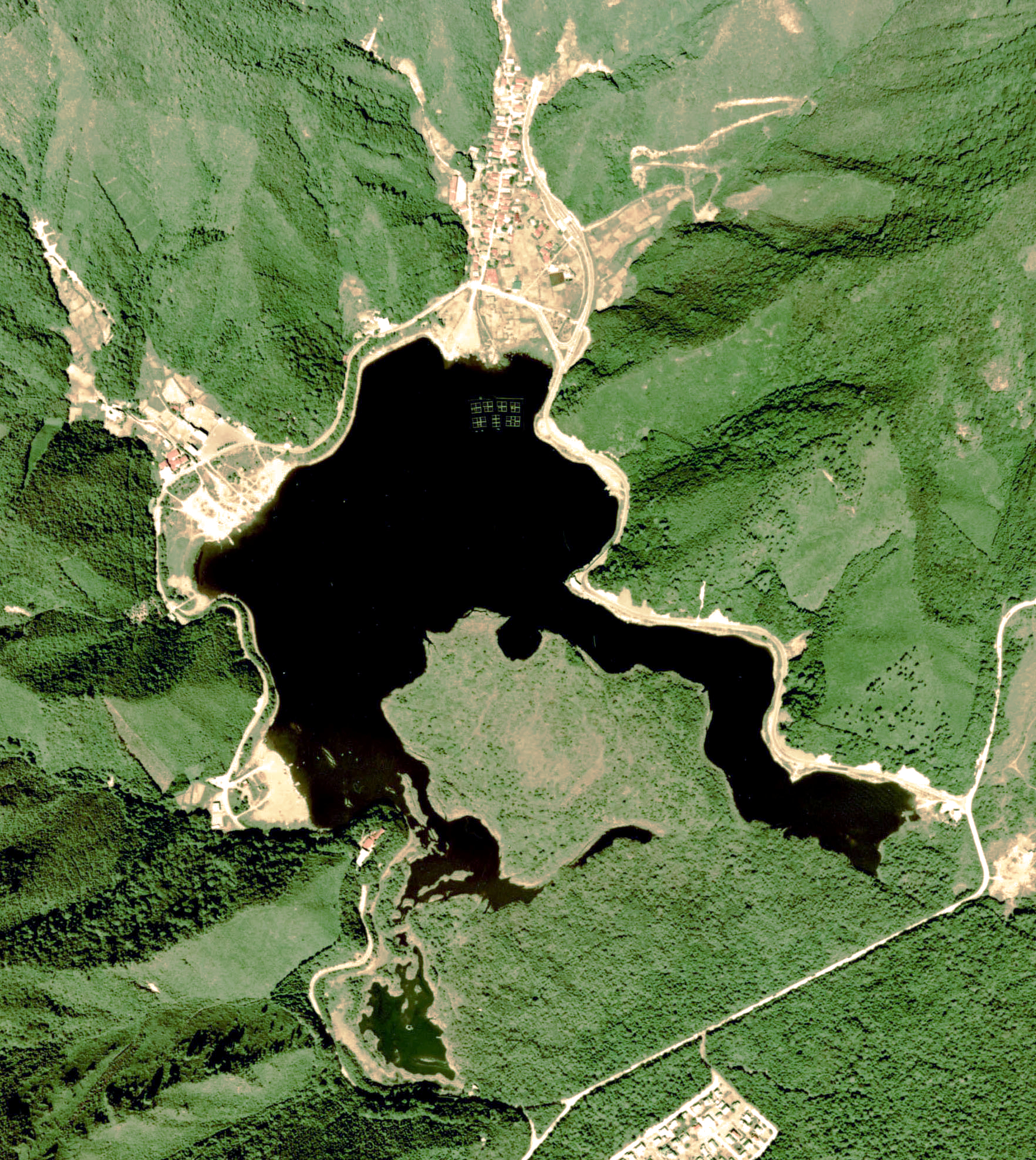
- Aerial view

- Location within Japan
- Location: Fujikawaguchiko, Yamanashi
- Coordinates: 35°29′20″N 138°36′35″E
- Primary outflows: none
- Basin countries: Japan
- Surface area: 0.5 km^{2} (0.19 sq mi)
- Max. depth: 15.2 m (50 ft)
- Shore length^{1}: 6.8 km (4.2 mi)
- Surface elevation: 900 m (3,000 ft)
- ^{1} Shore length is not a well-defined measure.

Lake Shōji (精進湖, Shōji-ko) is one of the Fuji Five Lakes and located in the town of Fujikawaguchiko in southern Yamanashi Prefecture near Mount Fuji, Japan.

Lake Shōji is the smallest of the Fuji Five Lakes in terms of surface area, and third deepest, with a maximum water depth of 15.2 metres (50 ft). Its surface elevation of 900 metres (3,000 ft) is the same as that of Lake Motosu and Lake Sai, confirming that these three lakes were originally a single lake, which was divided into three by an enormous lava flow from Mount Fuji during an eruption from 864-868 AD. The remnants of the lava flow are now under the Aokigahara Jukai Forest, and there is evidence to indicate that these three lakes remain connected by underground waterways.

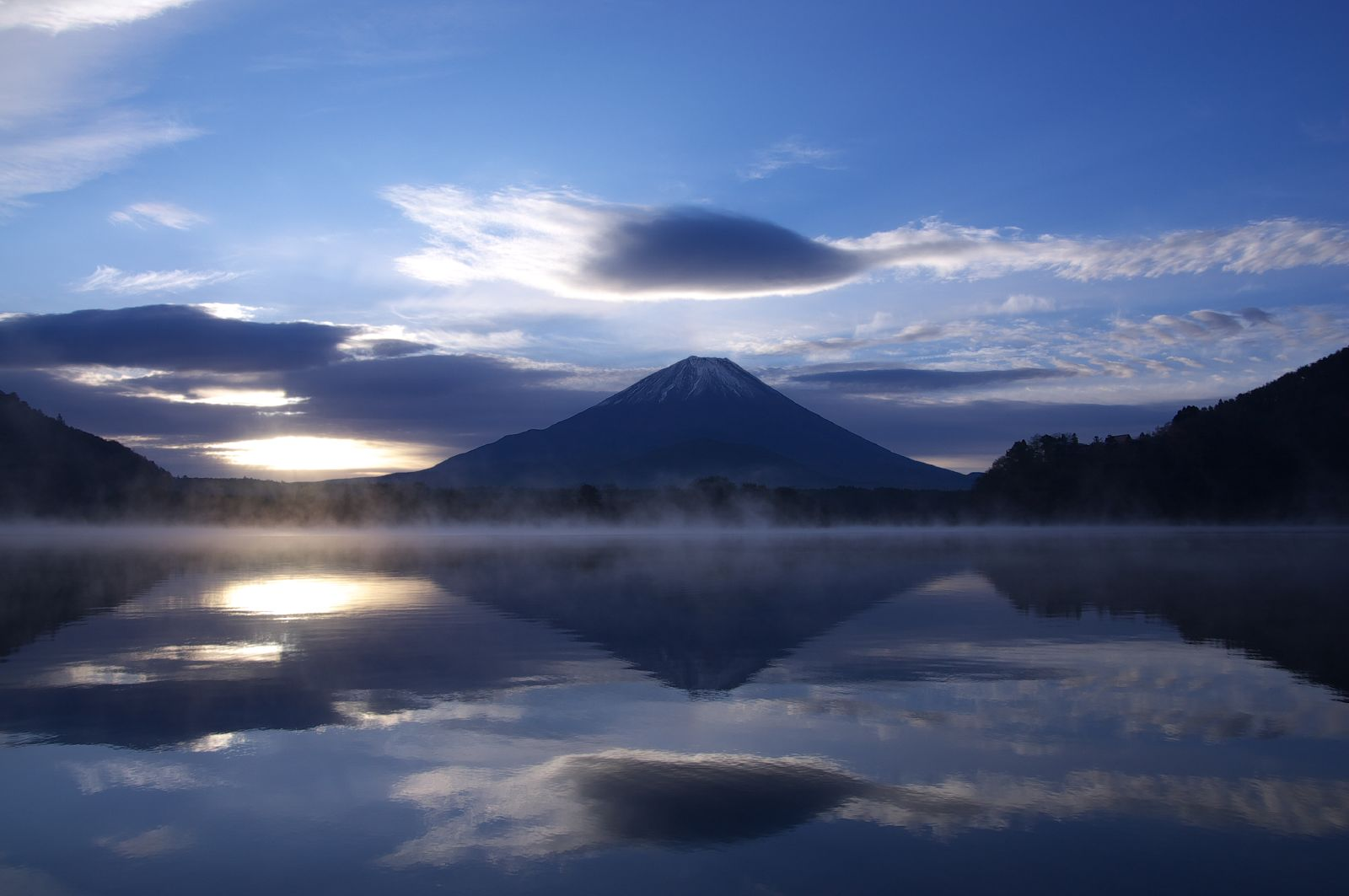
Mount Fuji and Lake Shōji

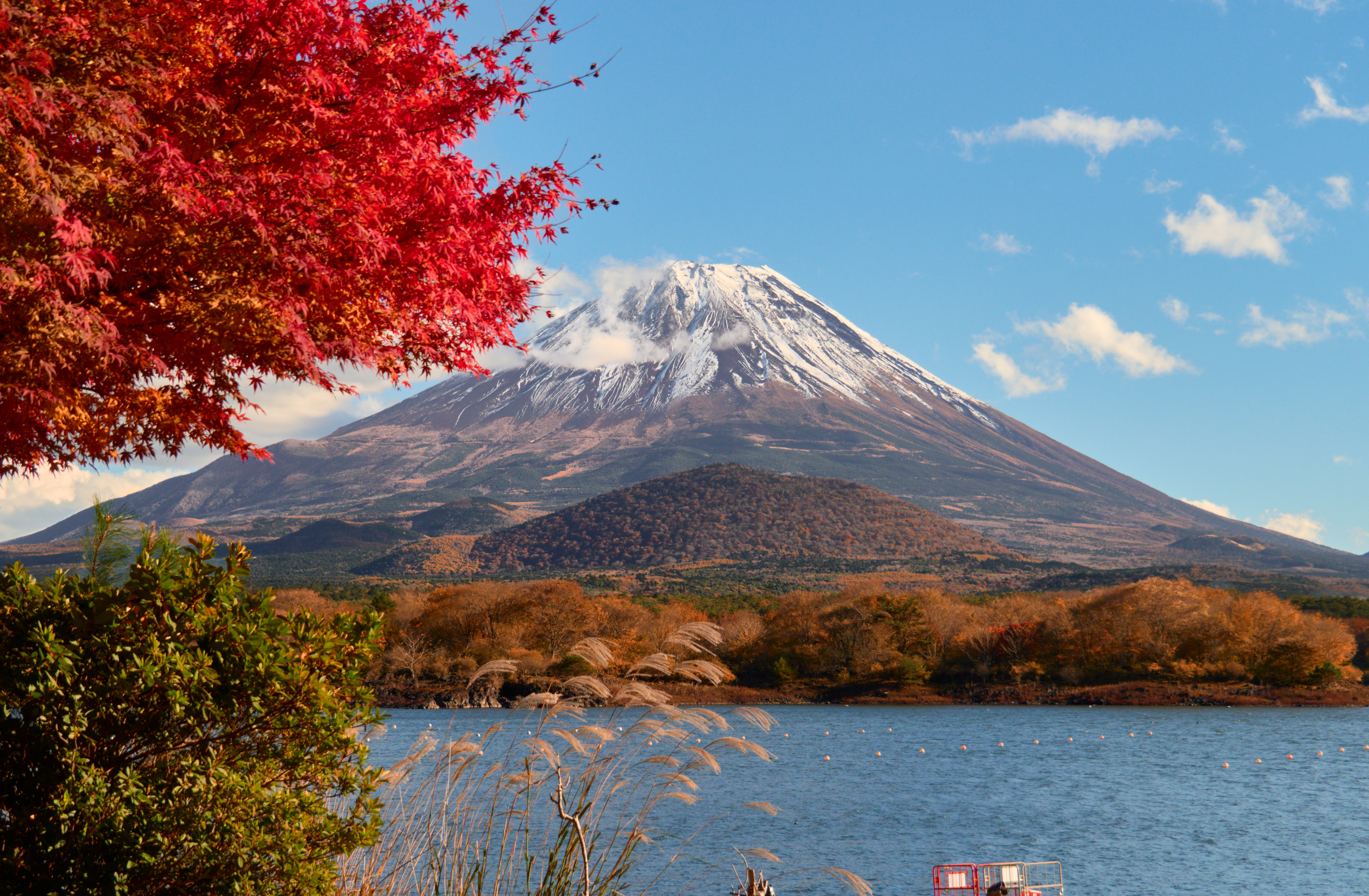
Mt. Fuji and Lake Shoji in autumn

The lake is within the borders of the Fuji-Hakone-Izu National Park.

As with the other Fuji Five Lakes, the area is a popular resort, with many lakeside hotels, windsurfing facilities, camp sites, and excursion boats. Japanese white crucian carp and wakasagi were introduced to the lake in the Meiji period, and sports fishing is also popular. The water of the lake lacks transparency and has a tendency towards a greenish hue due to algae.

Lake Shōji is given the name "Switzerland of East Asia" because Englishmen in the Meiji Era explored around the base of Mount Fuji, and remarked that the view of the mountain was most beautiful from Lake Shoji. The placid lake is rich in nutrients which include plankton. Here, rental boats are available along the shore to rent.

== See also ==
- Fuji Five Lakes
- Fuji-Hakone-Izu National Park
