= Mount Fuji Marathon =

Japanese marathon

- Date: November
- Location: Yamanashi Prefecture, Japan
- Event type: road
- Distance: Marathon
- Established: 2012
- Course records: Men: 2:21:36 (2018) (Japan) Yusuke Kodama; Women: 2:39:47 (2018) (Japan) Tomomi Sawahata
- Website: Mount Fuji Marathon
- Participants: 8,591 (2019)

The Mount Fuji Marathon (富士山マラソン, Fujisan Marason) is an annual marathon sporting event in Yamanashi Prefecture, Japan. The first running of the event took place on November 25, 2012.

== History ==
Prior to 2012 the race had been run 36 times as the "Kawaguchiko Marathon", or "Lake Kawaguchi Marathon". The course consisted of two laps of Lake Kawaguchi. In 2012, both the name of the race and the course were changed, with the route being changed to a single lap around Lake Kawaguchi and the nearby Lake Saiko.

Over 23,000 participants were registered for the inaugural race vs 13,000 participants the year before and organizers failed to take into account the logistics from the additional runners. Traffic backed up and over 5000 of the registrants were not able to run.

== Winners ==
Key: Course record

Edition	Year	Men's winner	Time (h:m:s)	Women's winner	Time (h:m:s)
1st	2012	Norio Kamijo (JPN)	2:21:53	Natsuko Muramatsu (JPN)	2:52:54
2nd	2013	Yuta Koyama (JPN)	2:24:16	Toshiko Yoshikawa (JPN)	2:51:59
3rd	2014	Yuta Koyama (JPN)	2:24:31	Mayumi Uchiyama (JPN)	2:51:51
4th	2015	Yuta Koyama (JPN)	2:25:37	Yuki Ogawa (JPN)	2:57:26
5th	2016	Yusuke Kodama (JPN)	2:27:33	Munkhzaya Bayartsogt (MGL)	2:48:46
6th	2017	Naoki Matsuoka (JPN)	2:28:46	Tomomi Sawahata (JPN)	2:40:31
7th	2018	Yusuke Kodama (JPN)	2:21:36	Tomomi Sawahata (JPN)	2:39:47
8th	2019	Yūsei Yamada (JPN)	2:23:57	Shōkō Shimoda (JPN)	2:40:31
