= Saiko Lake =

Lake in Fujikawaguchiko, Chūbu region, Japan

Western Lake
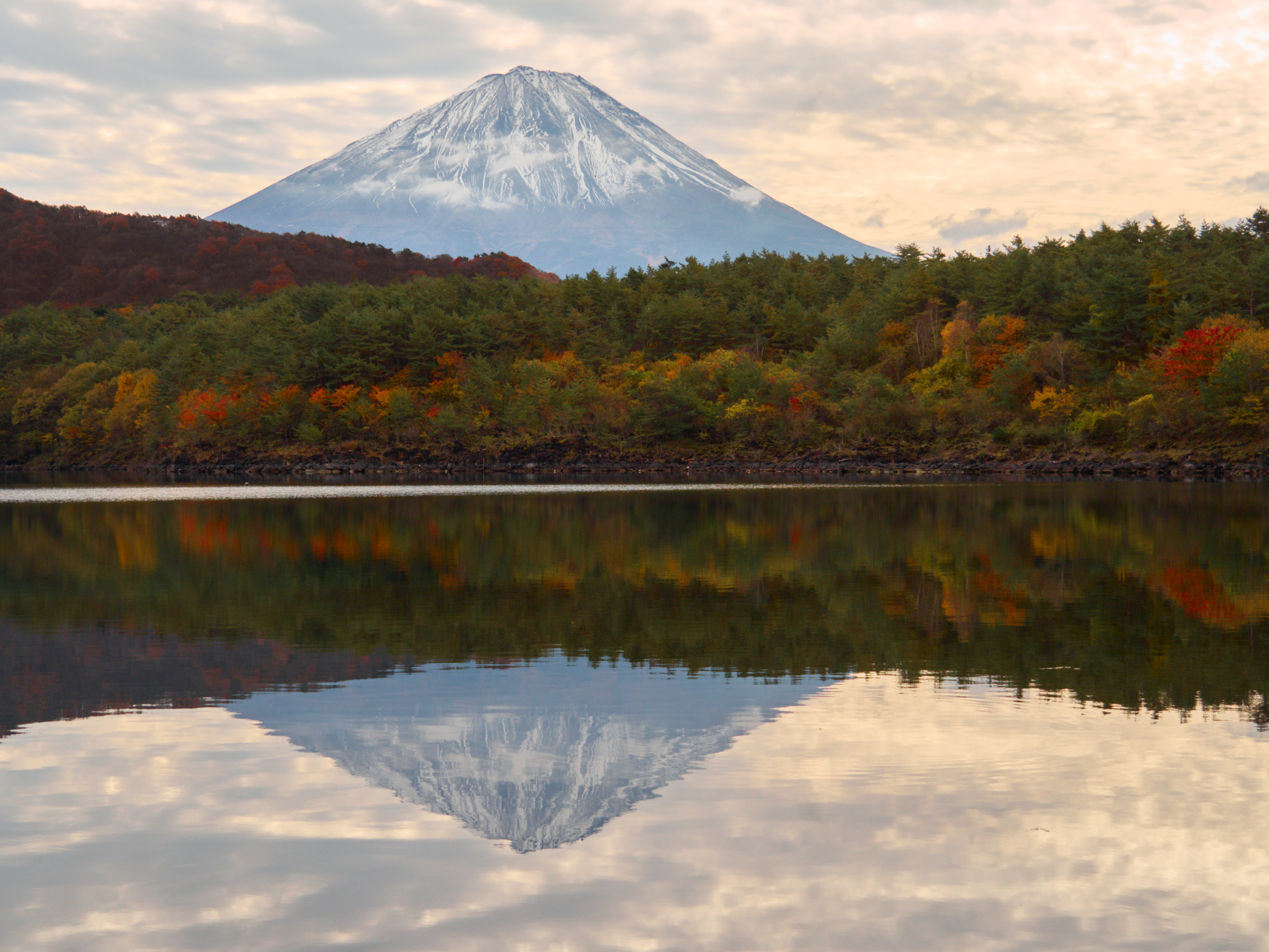
- Mount Fuji reflected in Saiko during autumn.

- Location within Japan Location within Yamanashi Prefecture
- Location: Yamanashi Prefecture
- Coordinates: 35°29′54″N 138°41′07″E
- Primary inflows: none
- Basin countries: Japan
- Surface area: 2.1 km^{2} (0.81 sq mi)
- Max. depth: 71.7 m (235 ft)
- Shore length^{1}: 9.85 km (6.12 mi)
- Surface elevation: 901 m (2,956 ft)
- ^{1} Shore length is not a well-defined measure.

Western Lake (西湖, Saiko), sometimes Saiko, is one of the Fuji Five Lakes and located in the town of Fujikawaguchiko in southern Yamanashi Prefecture near Mount Fuji, Japan.

It is the fourth of the Fuji Five Lakes in terms of surface area, and second deepest, with a maximum water depth of 71.1 metres (233 ft). Its surface elevation of 900 metres (3,000 ft) is the same as for Lake Motosu and Lake Shōji, confirming that these three lakes were originally a single lake, which was divided by an enormous lava flow from Mount Fuji during an eruption from 864 to 868 AD. The remnants of the lava flow are now under the Aokigahara Jukai Forest, and there is evidence to indicate that these three lakes remain connected by underground waterways.

The lake is within the borders of the Fuji-Hakone-Izu National Park.

Saiko has no natural drainage, but an artificial channel now connects it to Lake Kawaguchi. As with the other Fuji Five Lakes, the area is a popular resort, with many lakeside hotels, windsurfing facilities, camp sites, and excursion boats. Japanese white crucian carp, wakasagi and Kunimasu were introduced to the lake in the Meiji period, and sports fishing is also popular.

However, Kunimasu, which had been introduced to a number of lakes in Japan in the Taishō period were believed to have died out and become extinct, with the last reported sighting in 1935, until rediscovered in Lake Sai in 2010.

West Lake in Hangzhou, China, is written with the same kanji as Lake Sai.

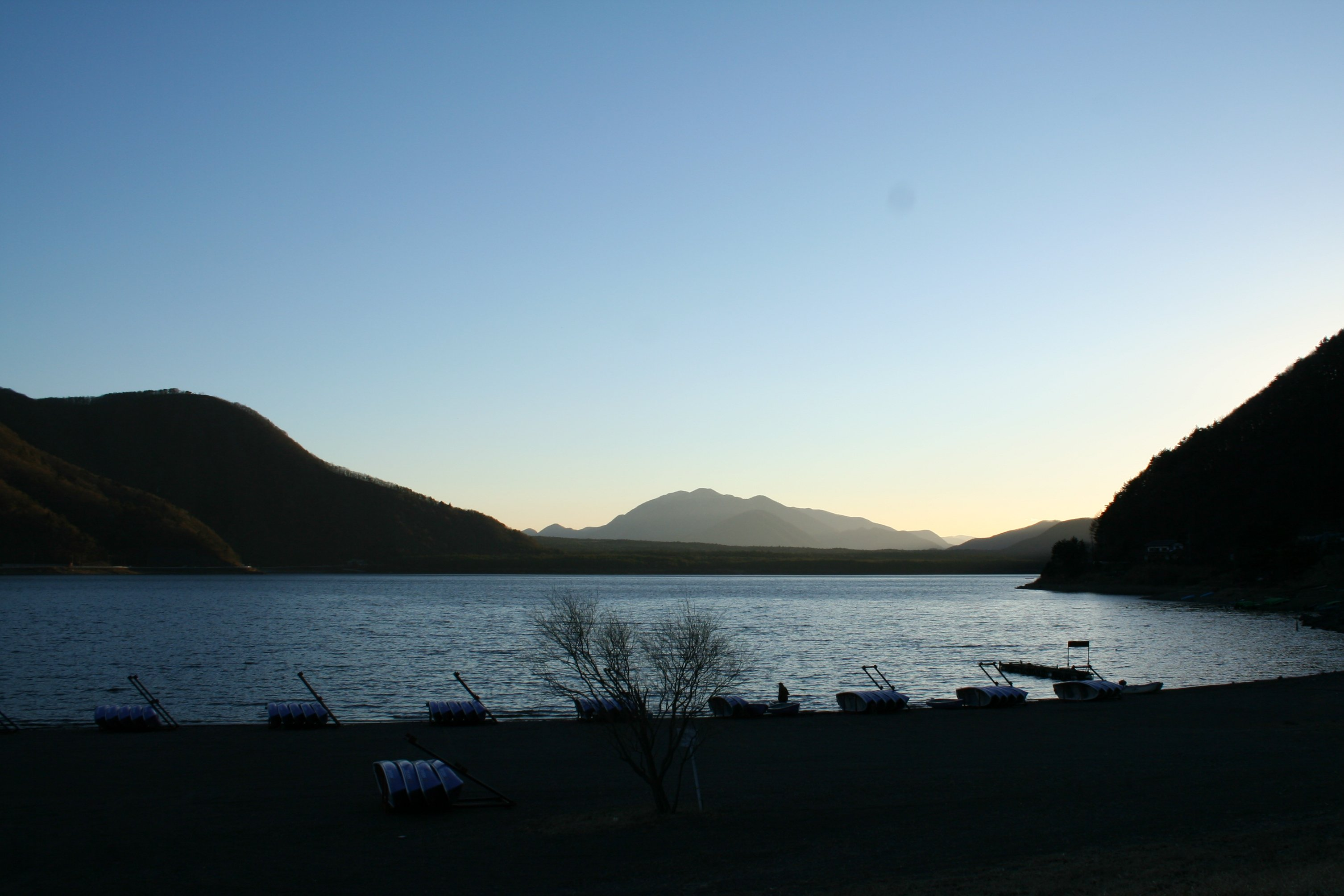
from Eastern end

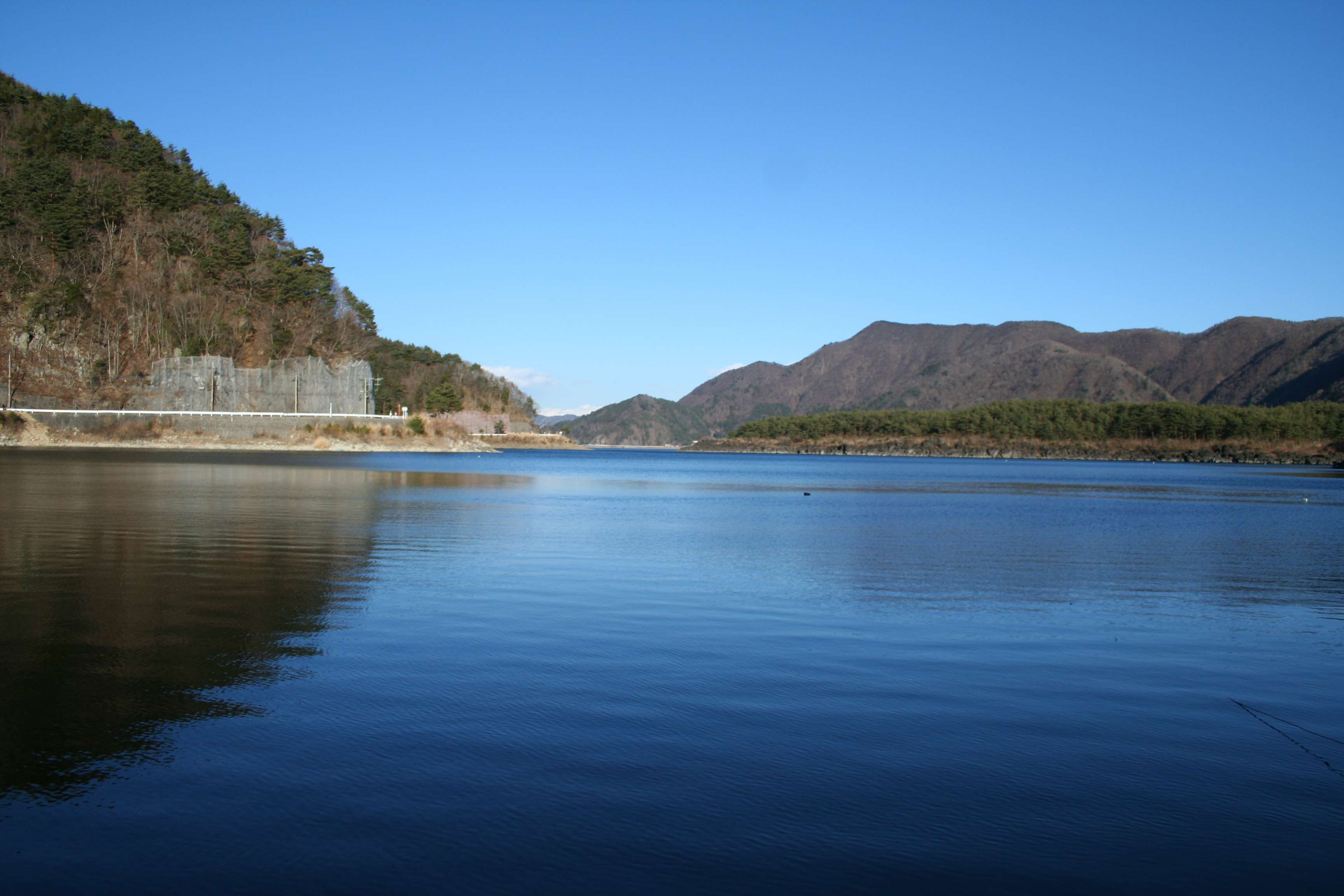
Lake Sai from West End

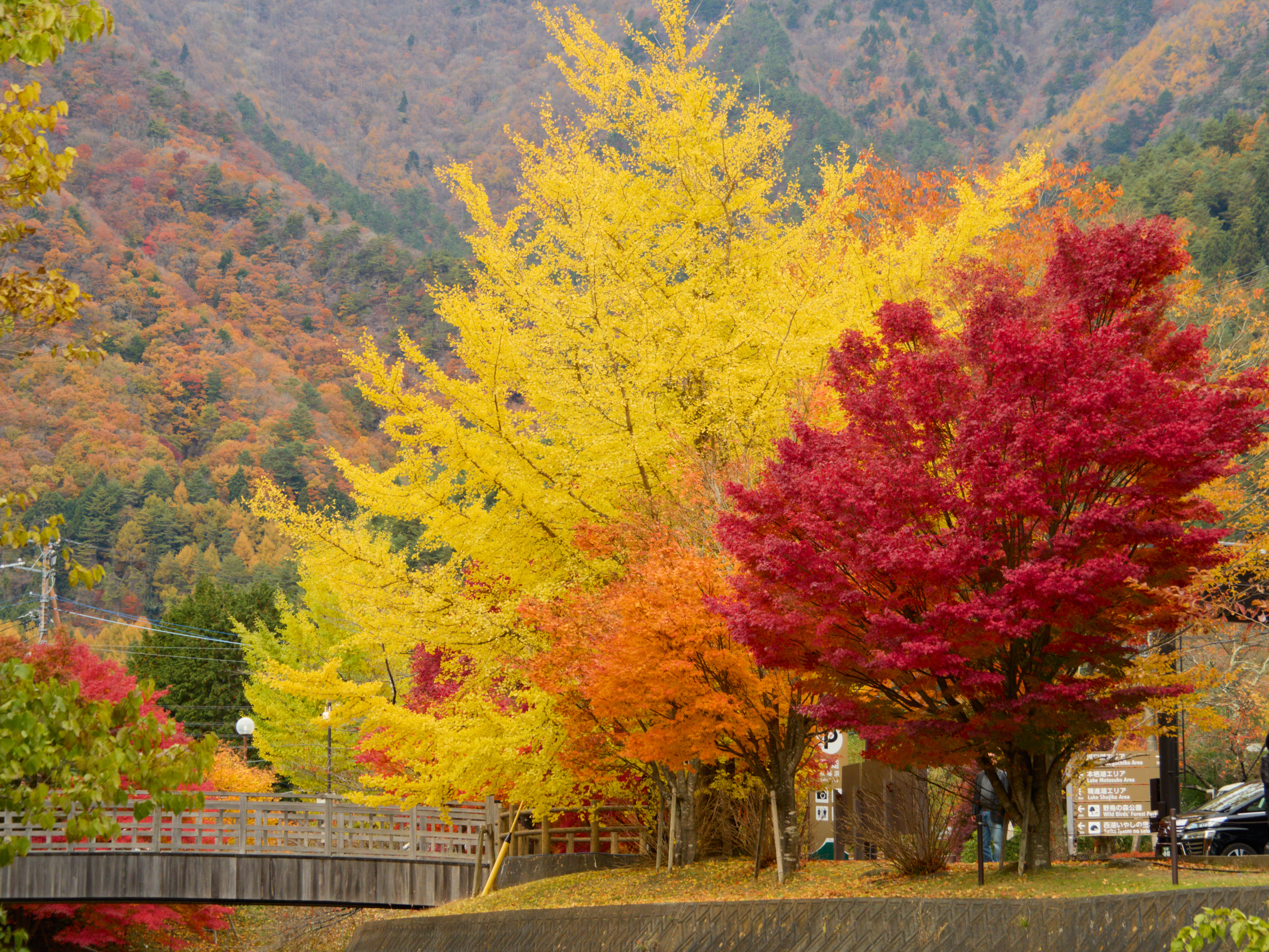
Autumn foliage trees beside a wooden footbridge at Lake Saiko.

Early evening at Lake Sai

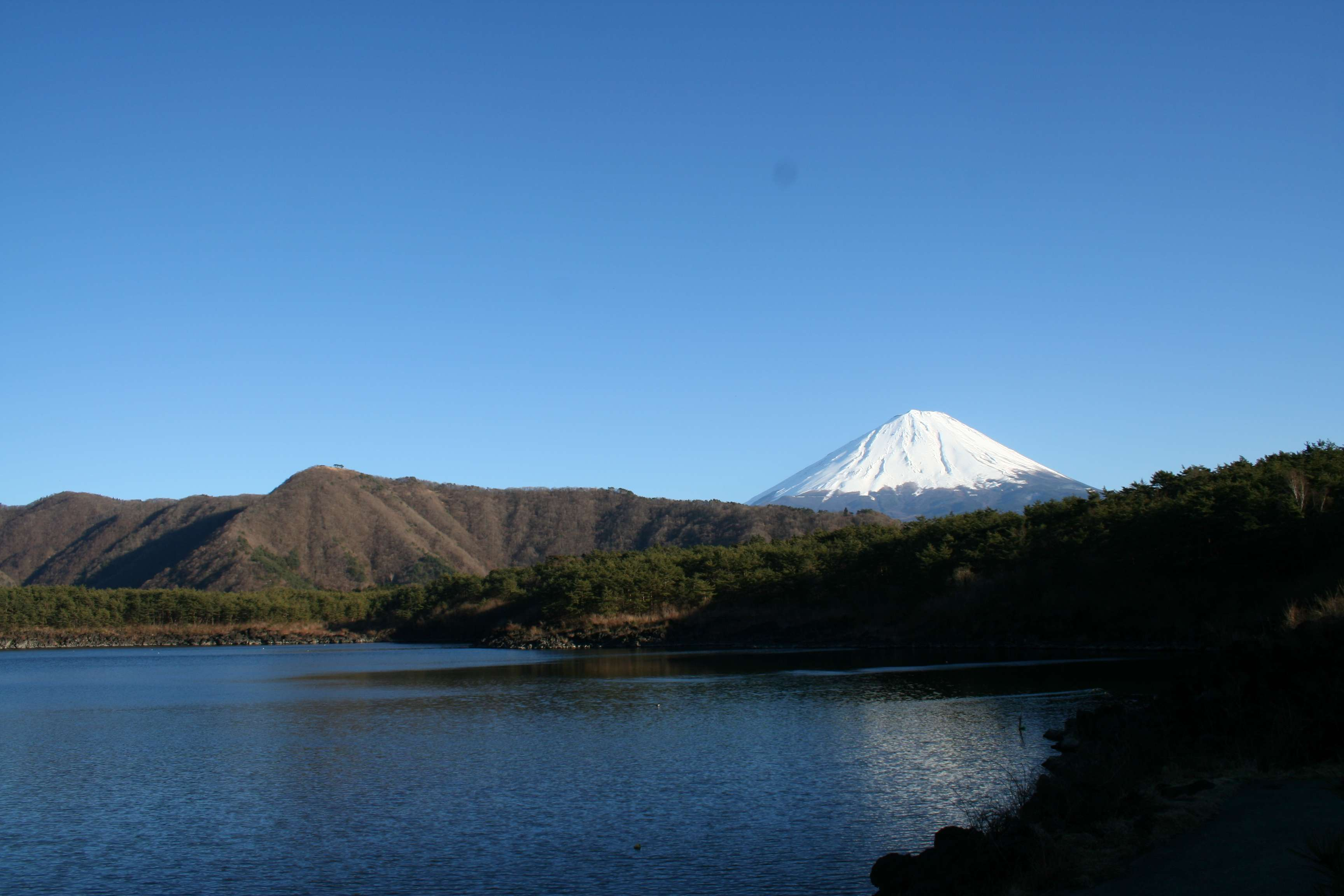
Lake Sai from West and with Mount Fuji in background

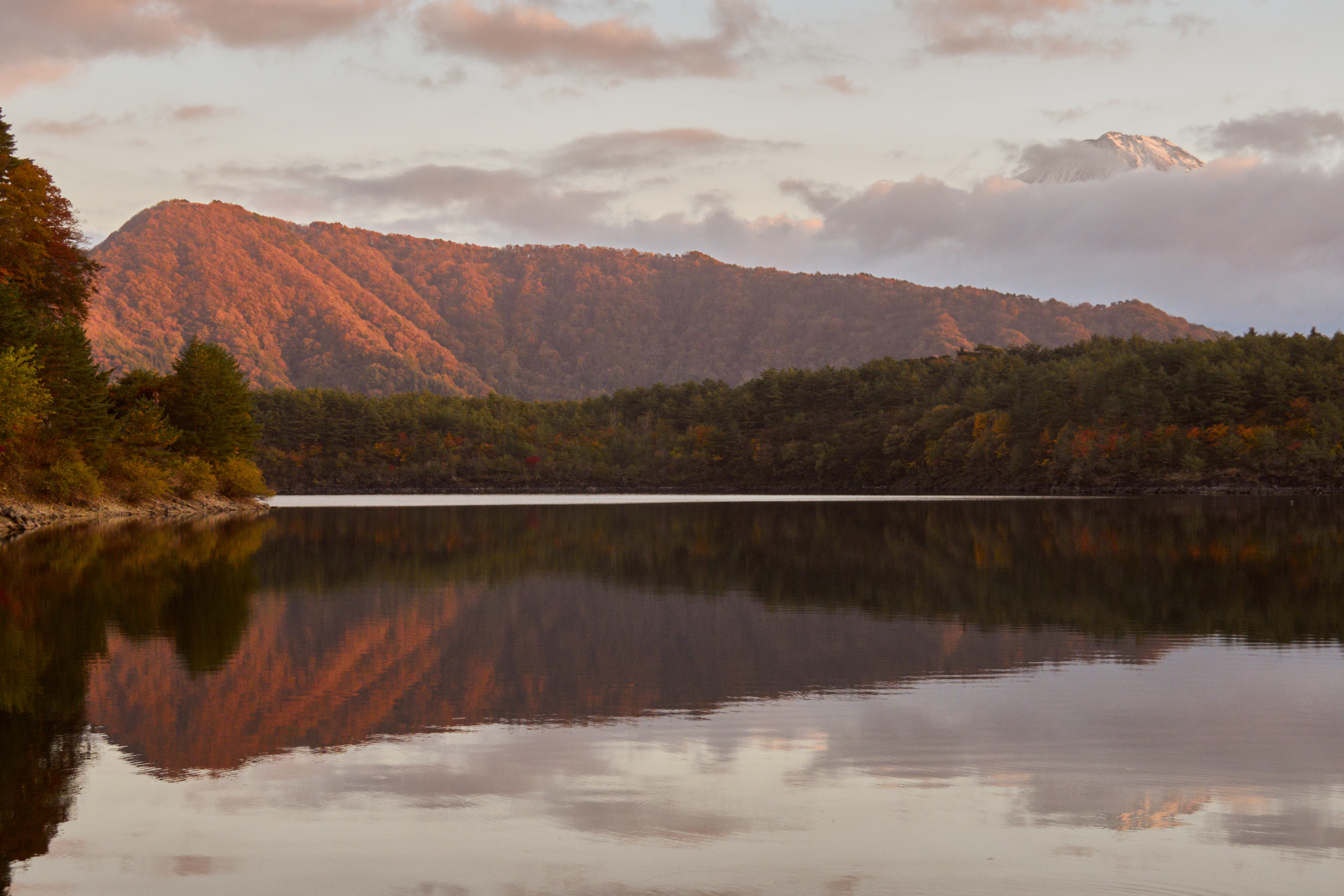
Lake Saiko with autumn foliage and an obscured Mt. Fuji

== See also ==
- Fuji Five Lakes
- Fuji-Hakone-Izu National Park
