= Fuji Five Lakes =

Five lakes around Mount Fuji, Japan

Coordinates: 35°24′57″N 138°52′16″E

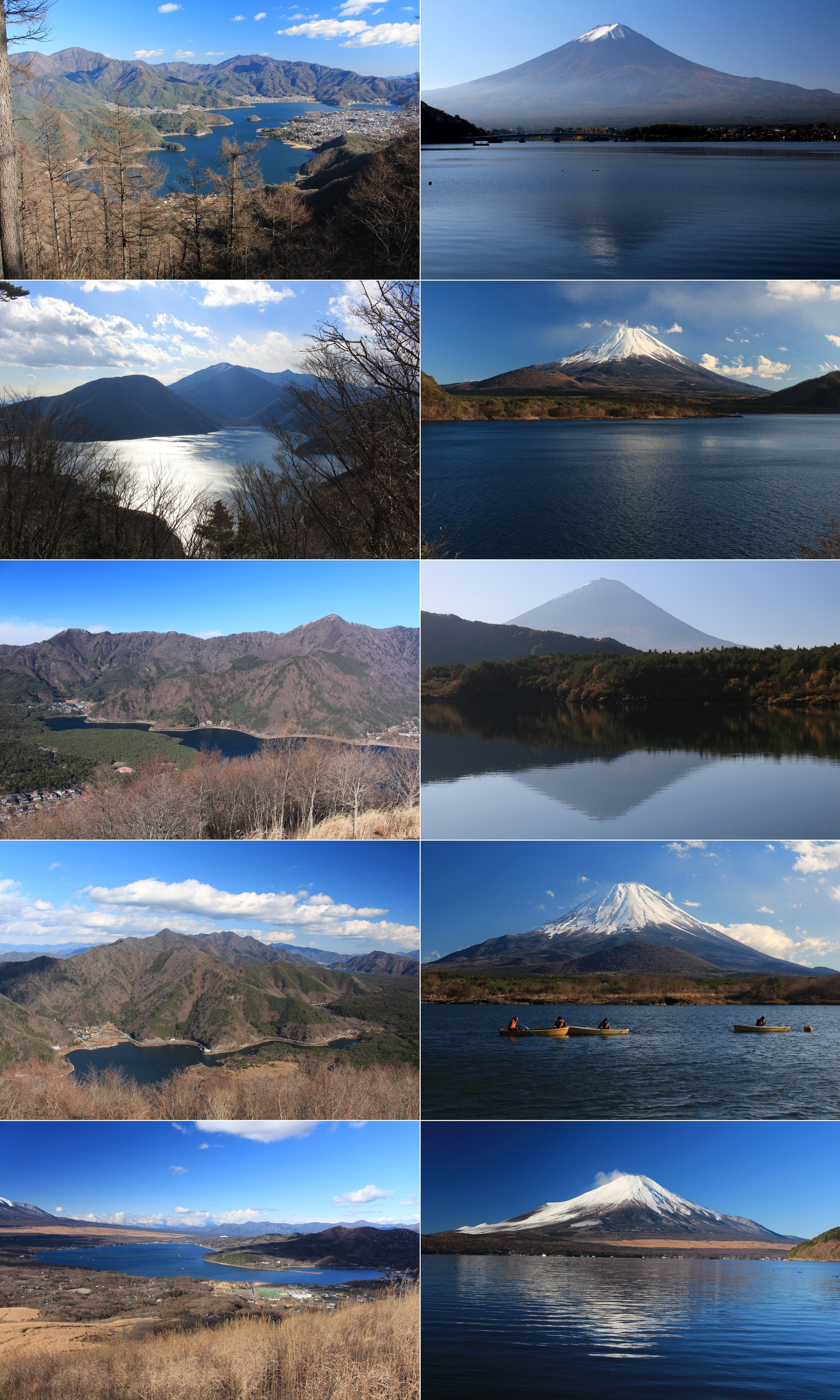
Fuji Five Lakes and View of Mount Fuji from the Five Lakes area: Lake Kawaguchi; Lake Motosu; Lake Sai; Lake Shōji; Lake Yamanaka

Fuji Five Lakes (富士五湖, Fuji-goko) is the name of the area located at the base of Mount Fuji in the Yamanashi Prefecture of Japan. It has a population of about 100,000 and sits about 1,000 meters (3,300 ft) above sea level. The five lakes created in the area by previous eruptions of Mount Fuji has given the area its name. The principal city in the region, Fujiyoshida, has a population of roughly 54,000 and is particularly famous for its udon noodles. Another point of interest is Aokigahara Jukai Forest. The Fuji Five Lakes was selected by the Tokyo Nichi Nichi Shimbun and Osaka Mainichi Shimbun as one of the Twenty-Five Winning Sites of Japan in 1927.

== Lakes of the Fuji Five Lakes ==
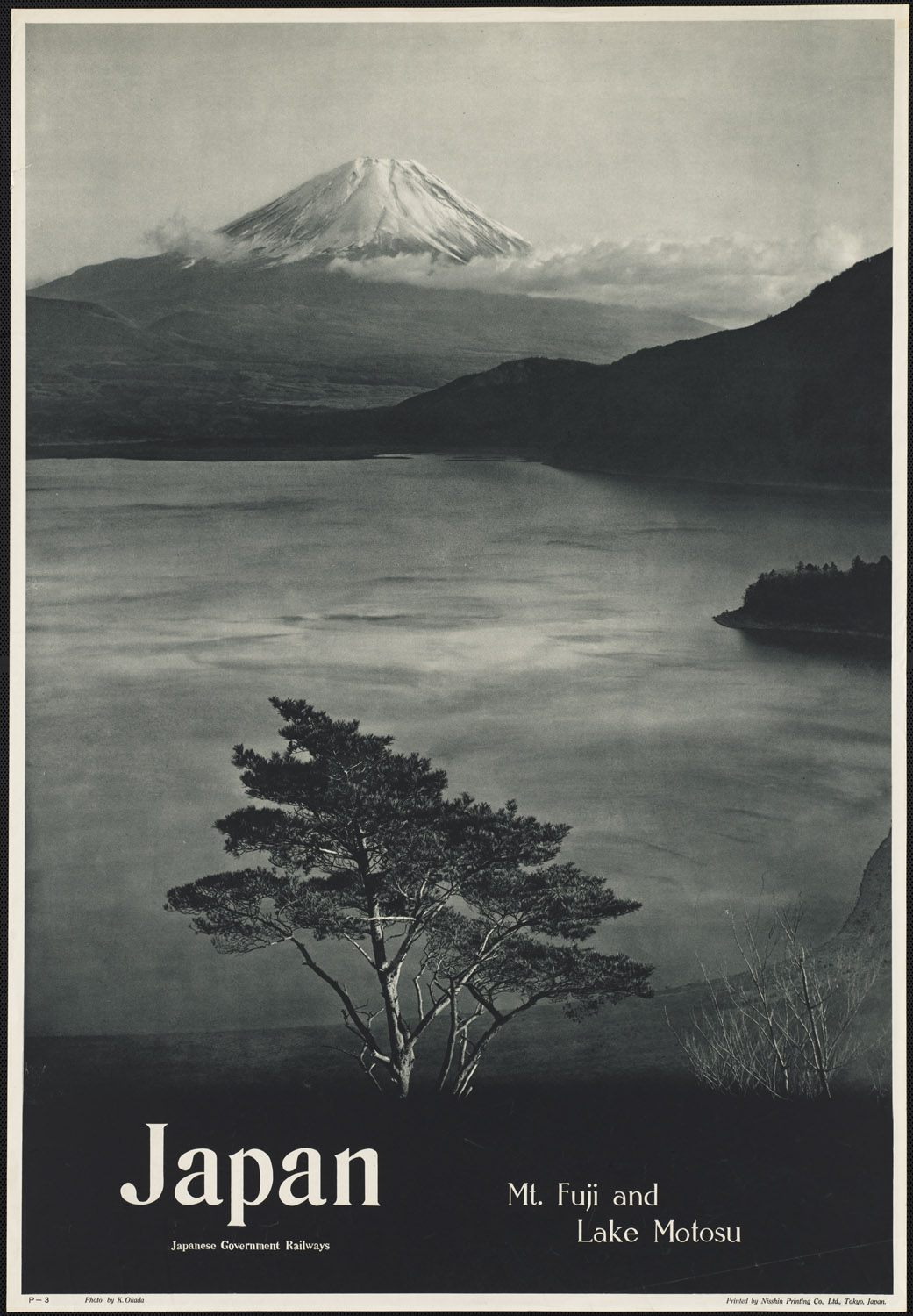
1930s travel poster depicting Lake Motosu.

The five lakes are located in an arc around the northern half of Mount Fuji. In ancient times, lava flow from a volcanic eruption of Mount Fuji spread across the area, damming up rivers and resulting in the formation of these lakes. They are all considered excellent tourist attractions and fishing spots.

=== Lake Kawaguchi ===
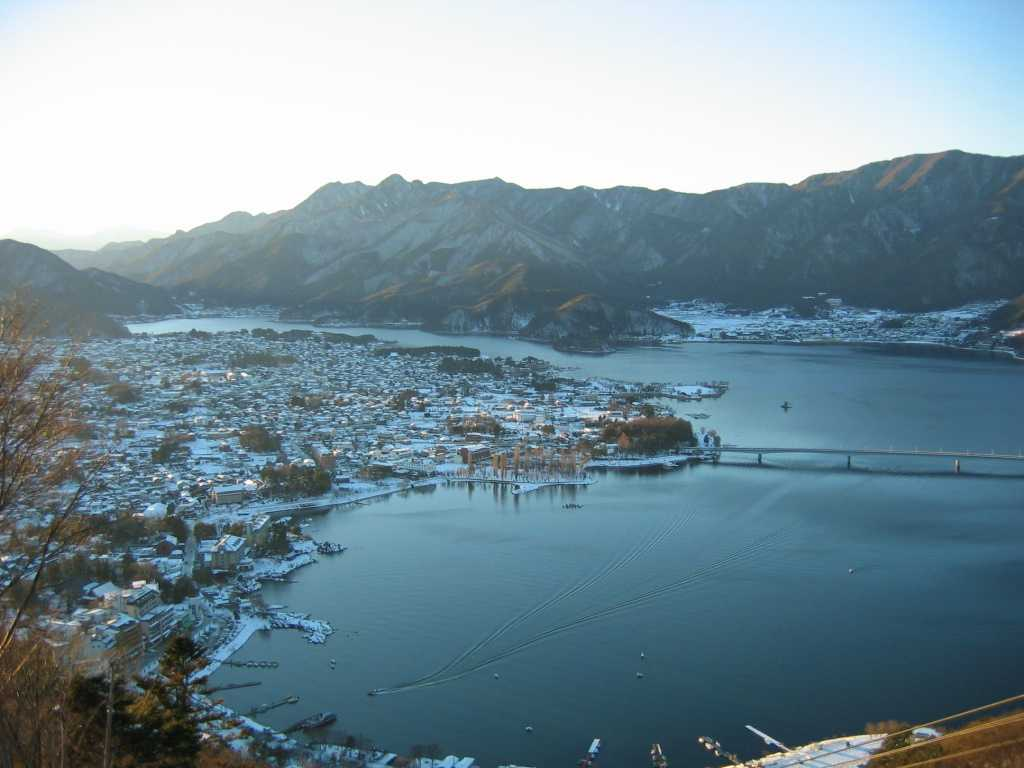
A view of Lake Kawaguchi

Lake Kawaguchi (河口湖 Kawaguchi-ko) is the most famous of the five lakes, and images of this lake are usually used in posters and commercials for the Fuji Five Lakes area. A large number of hotels line its banks, as do locals providing boat rides to the tourists. It is the only lake in the Fuji Five Lakes area that has an island. Many local cultural events are held near this lake throughout the year.

=== Lake Motosu ===
Lake Motosu (本栖湖 Motosu-ko) is the ninth deepest lake of Japan, at 140 meters (460 ft). This lake, along with Lake Sai and Lake Shōji, was formed by lava flowing across what is now Aokigahara Jukai Forest and into the enormous lake that once dominated the area, and these three lakes remain still connected by underground waterways.

=== Lake Sai ===
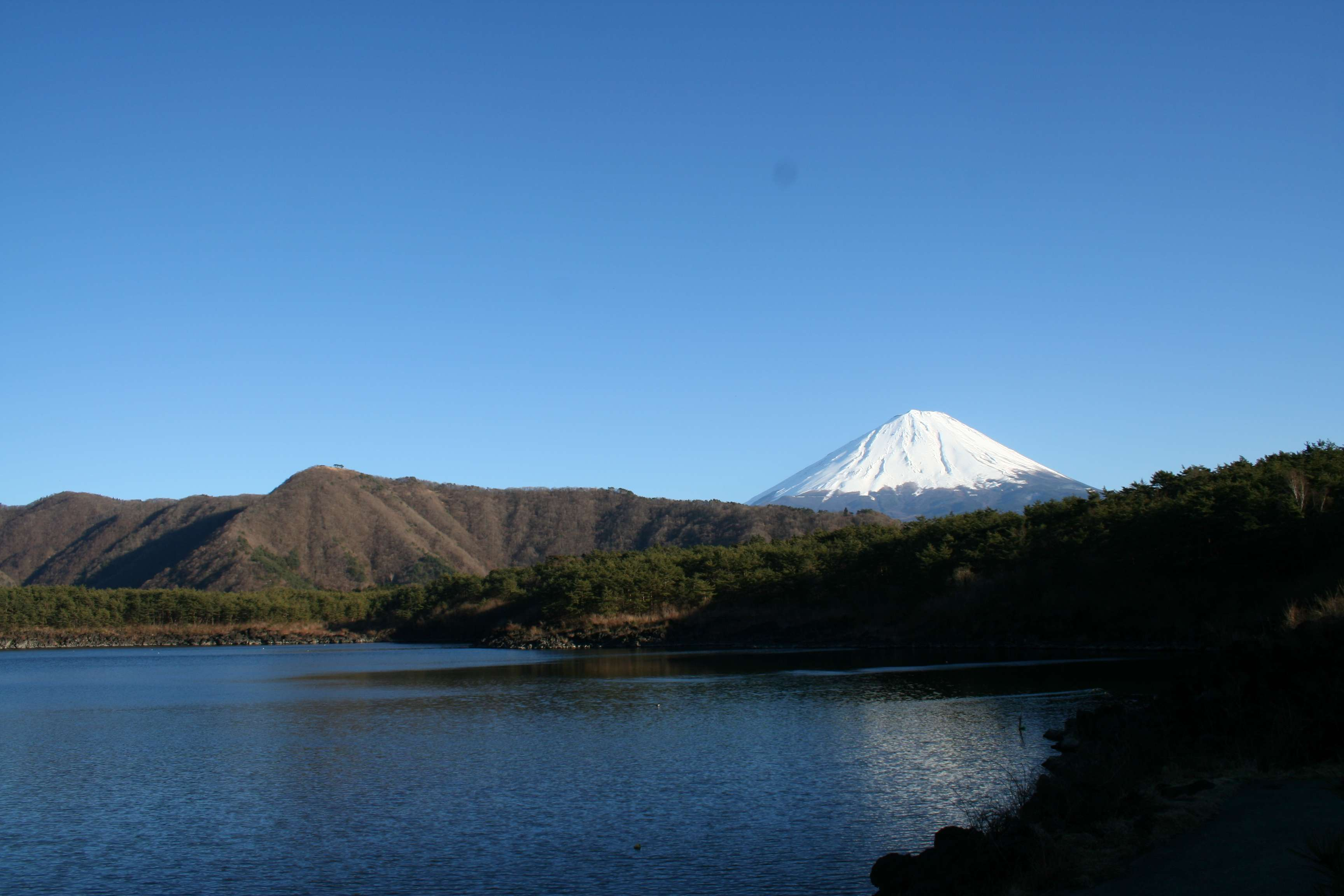
Lake Sai

The western side of Sai (西湖 Sai-ko) shares its banks with the Aokigahara forest.

=== Lake Shōji ===
Lake Shōji (精進湖 Shōji-ko) is the smallest of the five lakes. Remnants of lava flows still protrude from the water, and locals often fish from these rocky outcrops.

=== Lake Yamanaka ===
The easternmost and largest of the five lakes, Lake Yamanaka (山中湖 Yamanaka-ko) is also the third highest lake in Japan, standing at 980 meters (3,220 ft) above sea level.

== Tourism industry ==
Most of the capital coming into the area comes from the tourism industry. Approximately 100,000,000,000 yen is spent by 9,000,000 sightseers every year. The main attractions of the area include:

- Mount Fuji
- Onsens
- Fuji-Q Highland – an amusement park featuring one of the world's highest roller coasters.
- The lakes – sightseeing, sailing, and fishing.
- Hiking and mountain climbing.
- Village of Healing (いやしの里 iyashinosato)– a historically accurate, rebuilt Japanese village.
