= Fuji-Hakone-Izu National Park =

National park in Eastern Japan

Fuji-Hakone-Izu National Parks
- 富士箱根伊豆国立公園
- IUCN category II (national park)
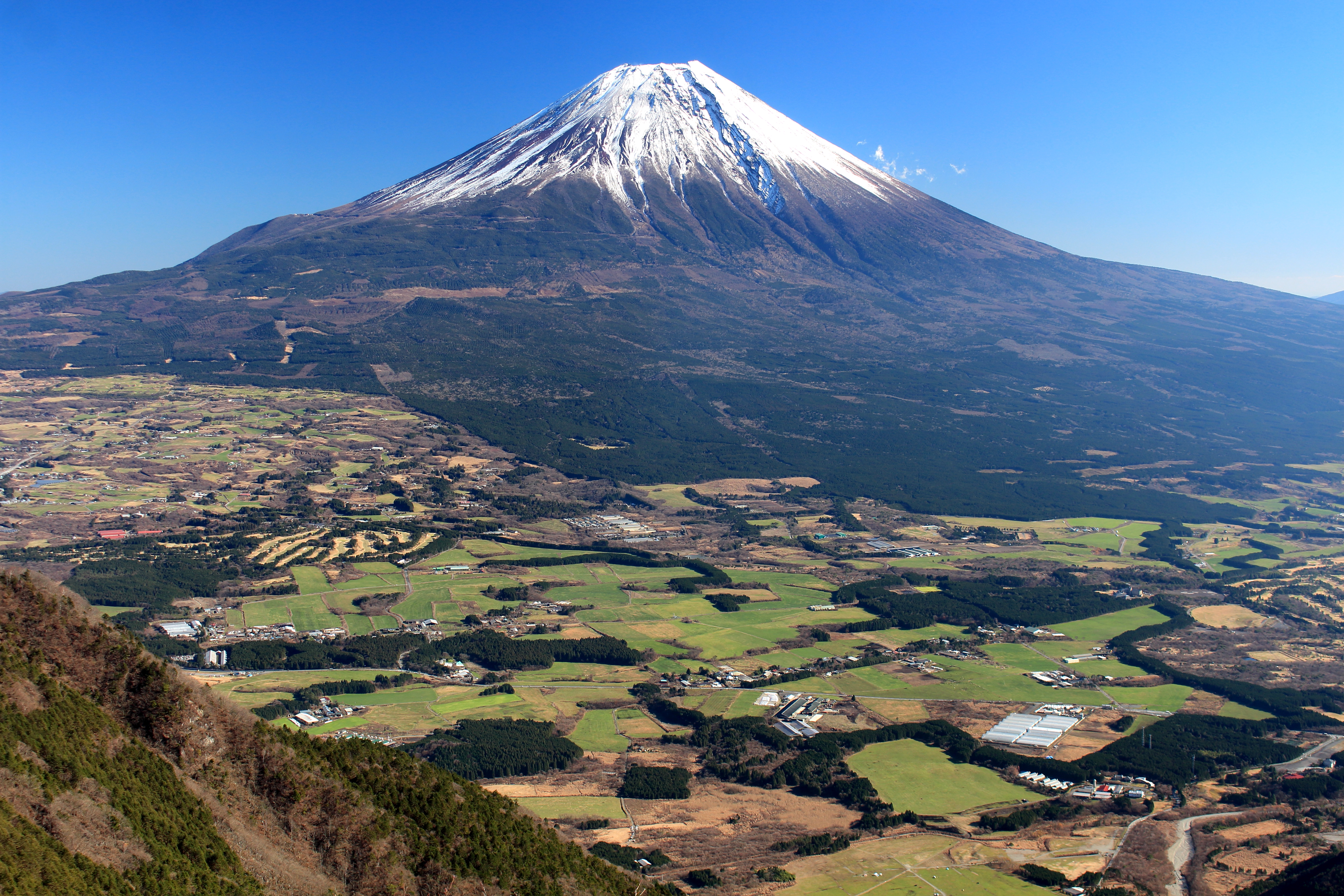
- Mount Fuji

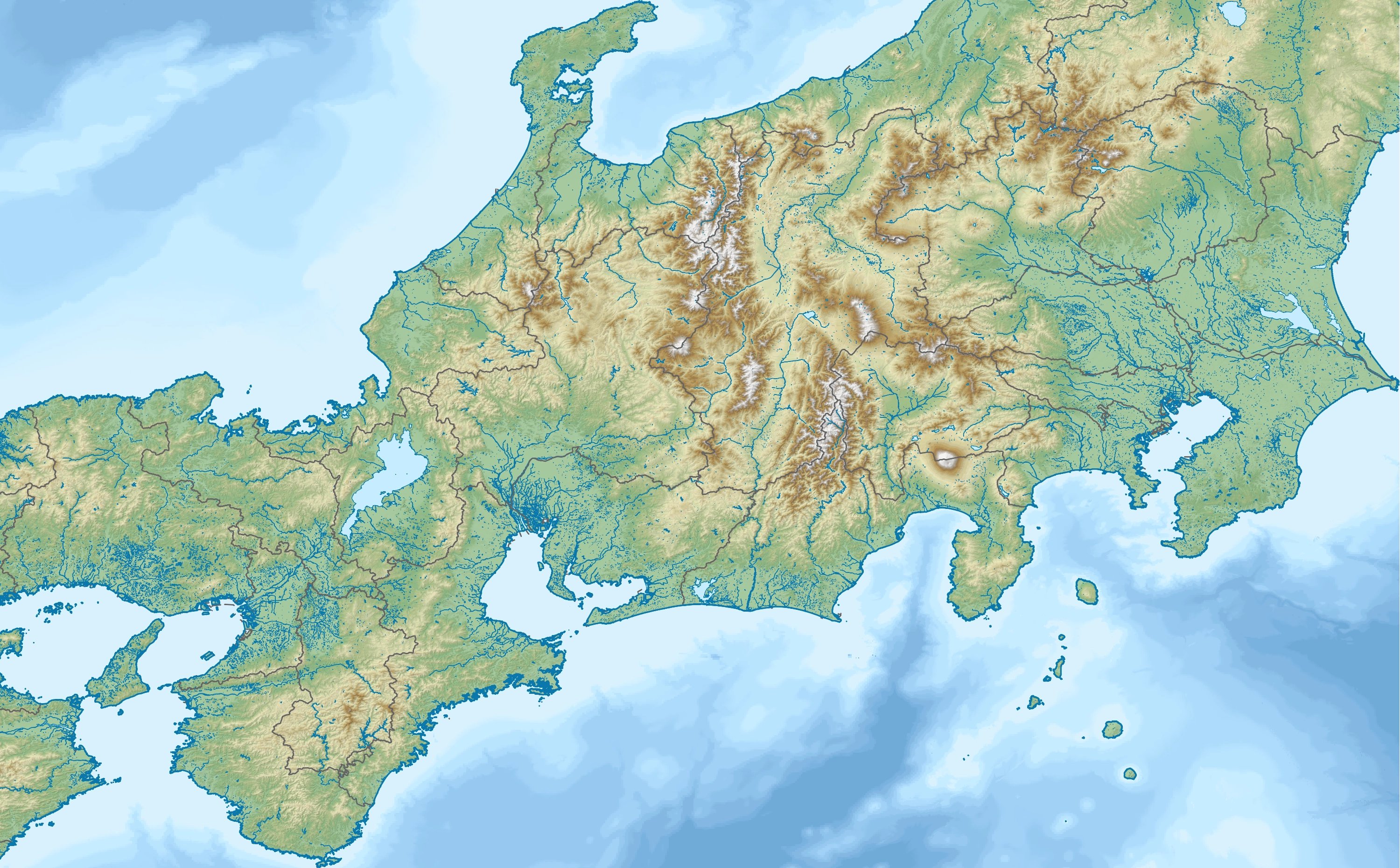
- Location within Central Japan Location within Japan
- Location: Central Honshu, Japan
- Coordinates: 34°40′N 139°0′E
- Area: 1,227 km^{2} (474 sq mi)
- Established: February 1, 1936
- Governing body: Ministry of the Environment

Fuji-Hakone-Izu National Park (富士箱根伊豆国立公園, Fuji-Hakone-Izu Kokuritsu Kōen) is a national park in Yamanashi, Shizuoka, and Kanagawa Prefectures, and western Tokyo Metropolis, Japan. It consists of Mount Fuji, Fuji Five Lakes, Hakone, the Izu Peninsula, and the Izu Islands. Fuji-Hakone-Izu National Park covers 1,227 square kilometres (474 mi^{2}).

Rather than being a specific spot, the park is a collection of dispersed tourist sites within the region. The furthest point south, the isle of Hachijō-jima, is several hundred kilometers from Mount Fuji. The park includes a variety of geographic features such as natural hot springs, coastlines on the Pacific, mountainous areas, lakes, and more than 1,000 volcanic islands. Vegetation in the park ranges from species of mountainous trees to the subtropical vegetation of the Izu Islands.

Fuji-Hakone-Izu National Park was established on February 2, 1936, as Fuji-Hakone National Park, and is one of the first four national parks established in Japan. In 1950, the Izu islands were added to the park, a change that was also reflected in the park's revised name. Due to its proximity to the Tokyo metropolis and ease of transportation, it is the most visited national park in all of Japan.

Nearby cities include Odawara, Fuji, Minami Ashigara, and Numazu.

== Points of interest ==
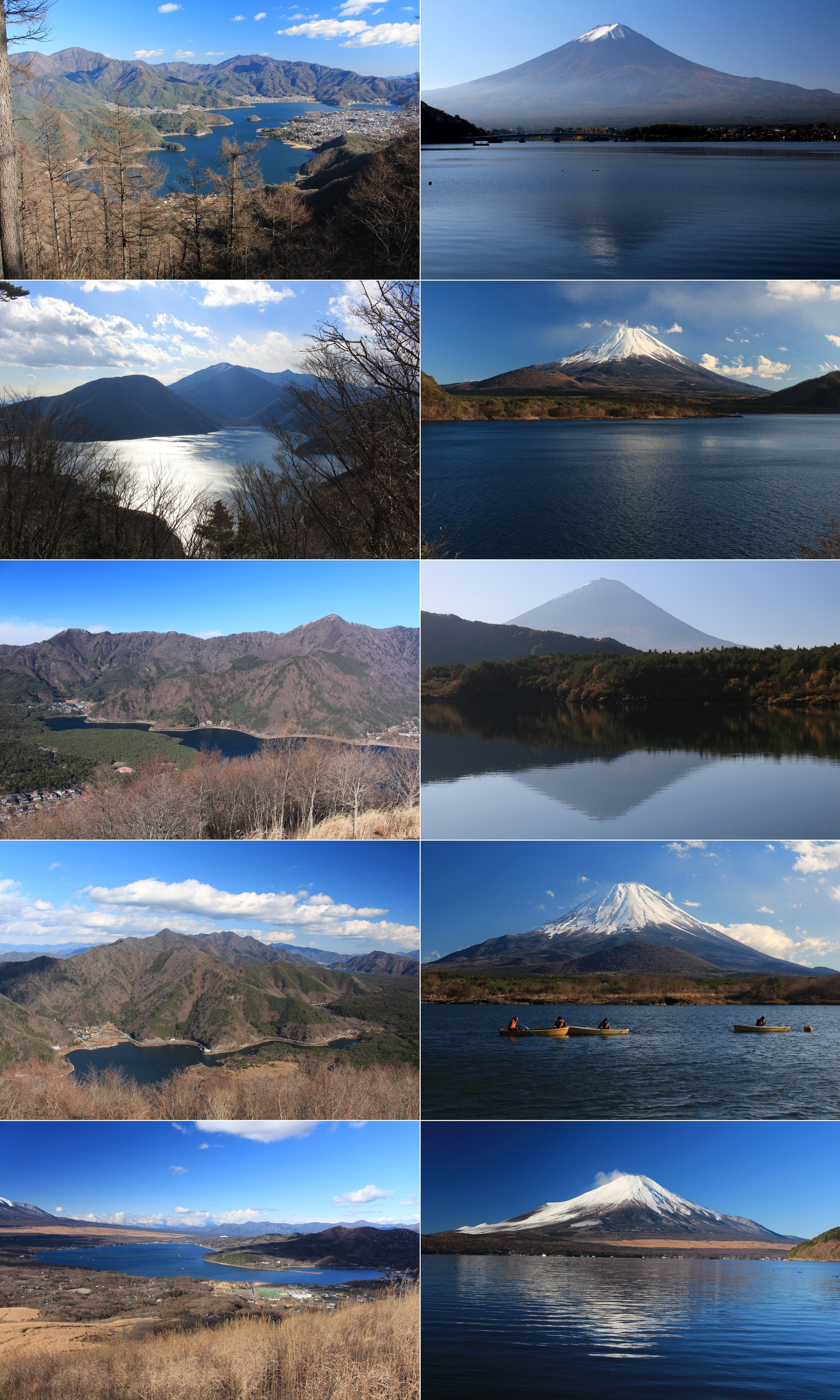
Mount Fuji and Fuji Five Lakes

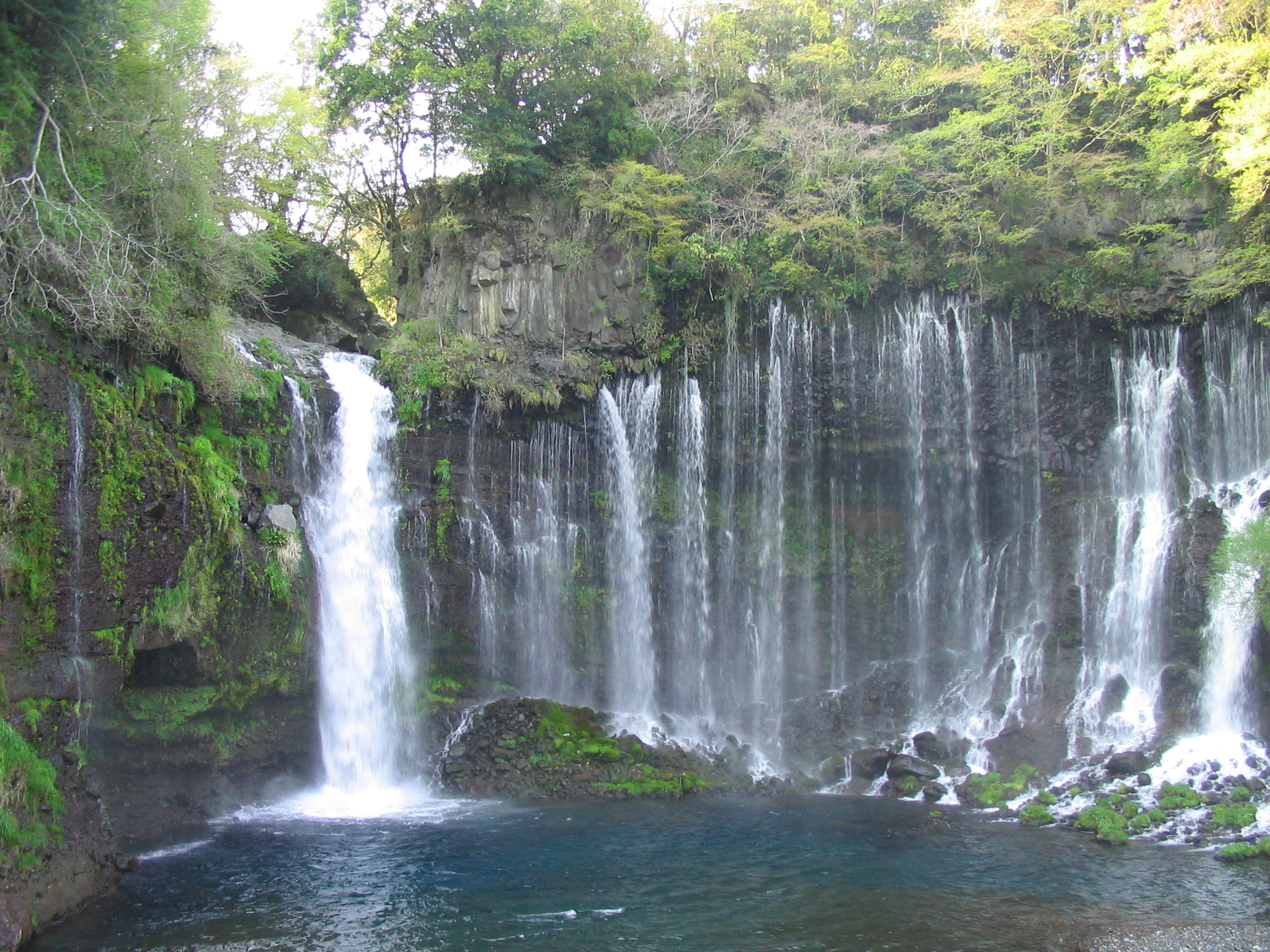
Shiraito Falls

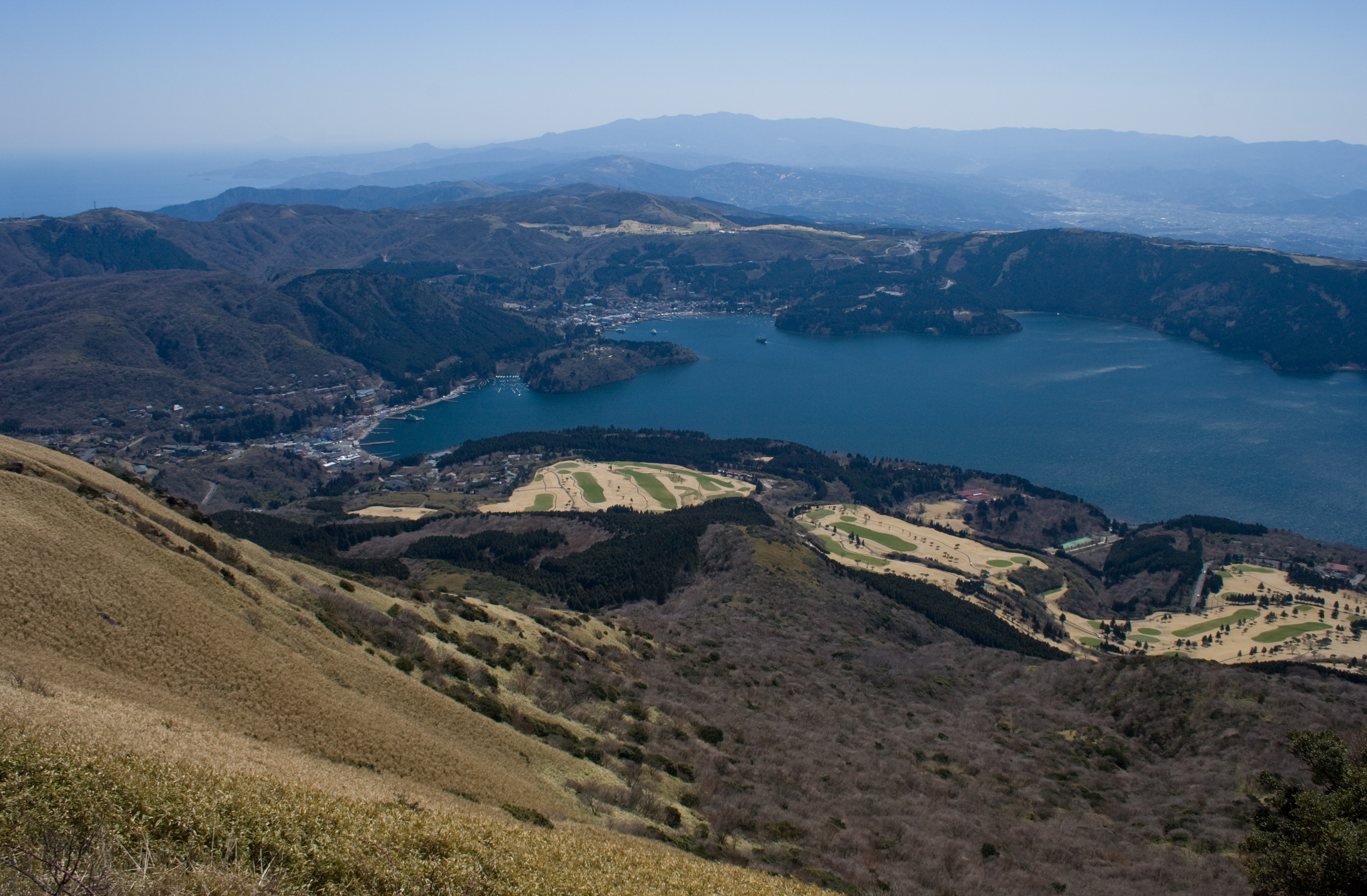
Ashi-no-ko Lake

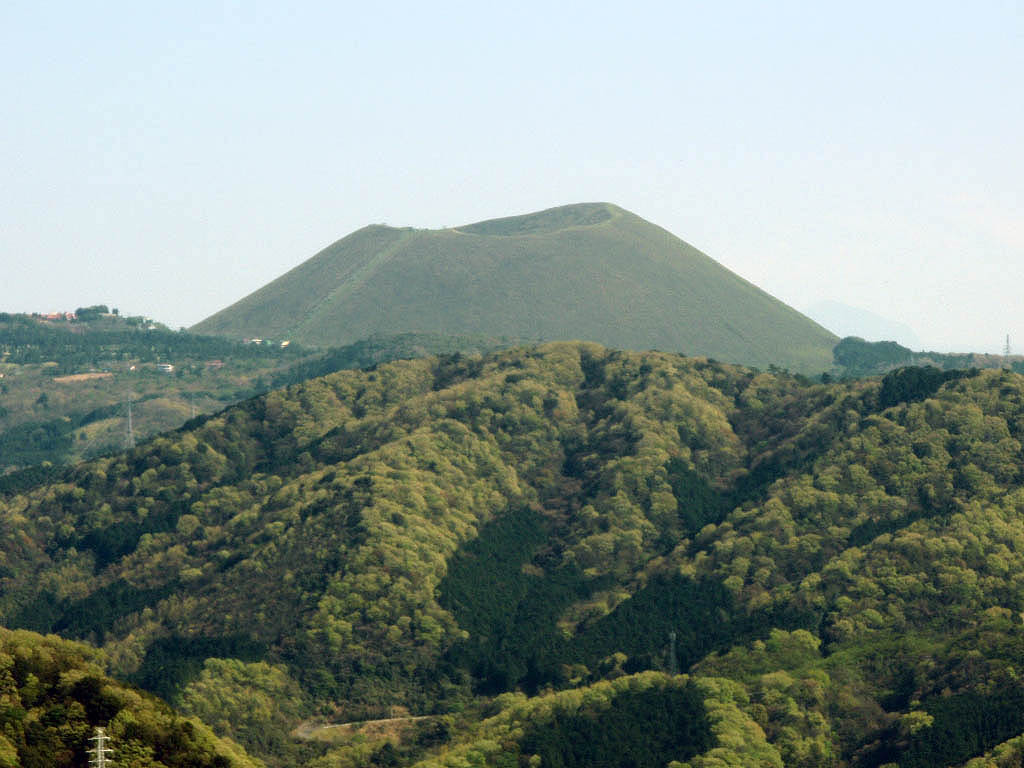
Mount Ōmuro

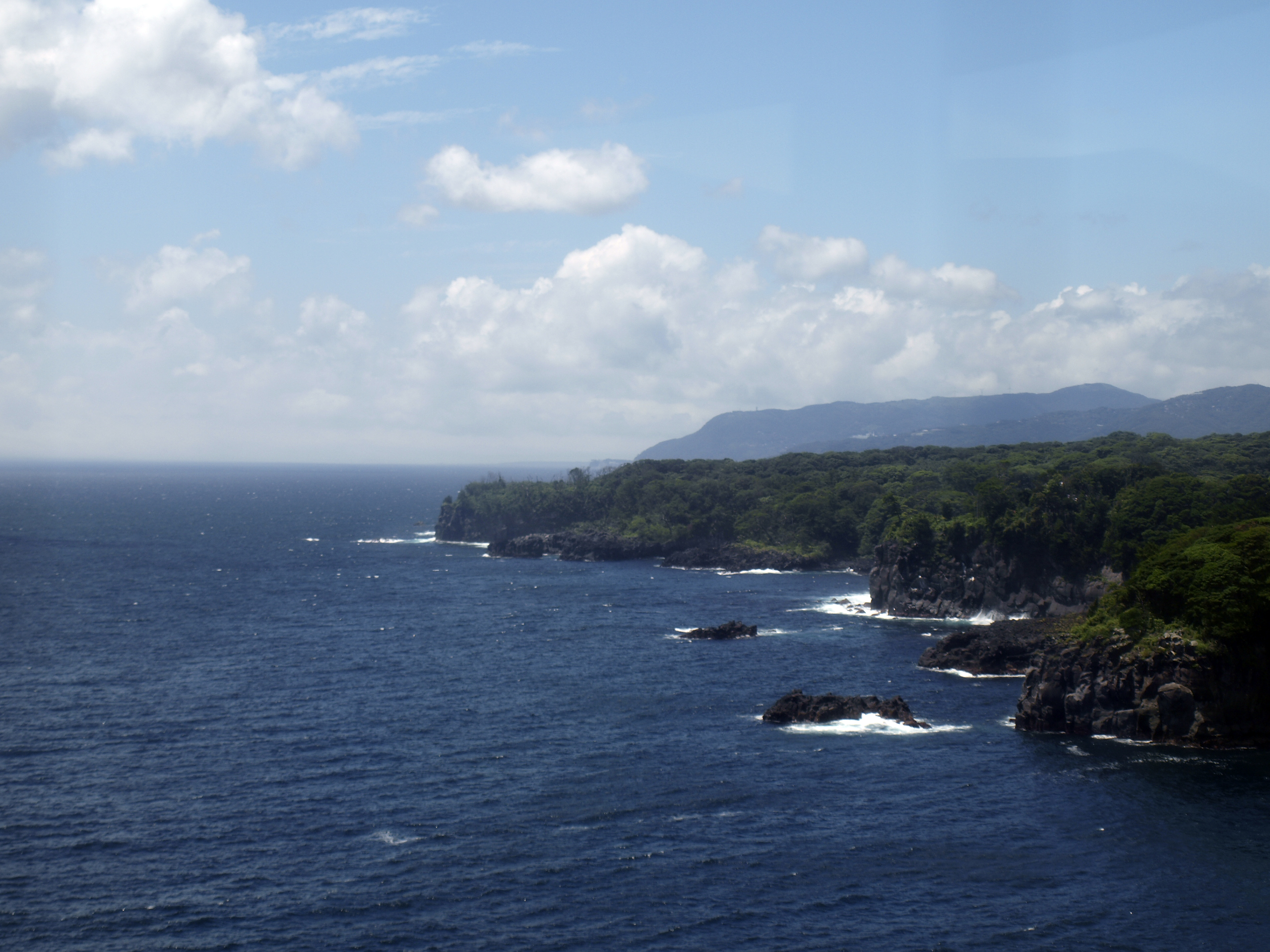
Jogasaki coast

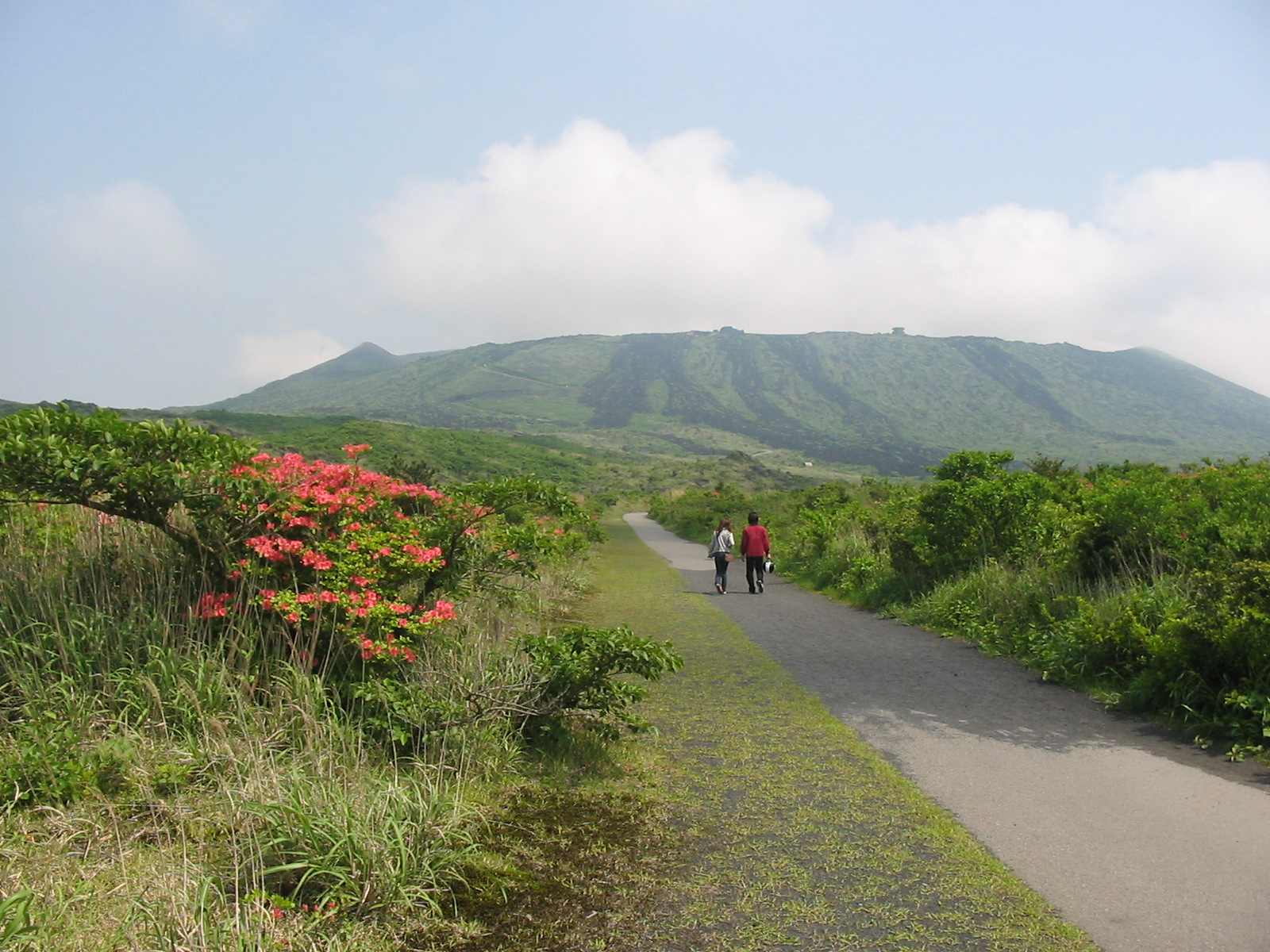
Izu Ōshima

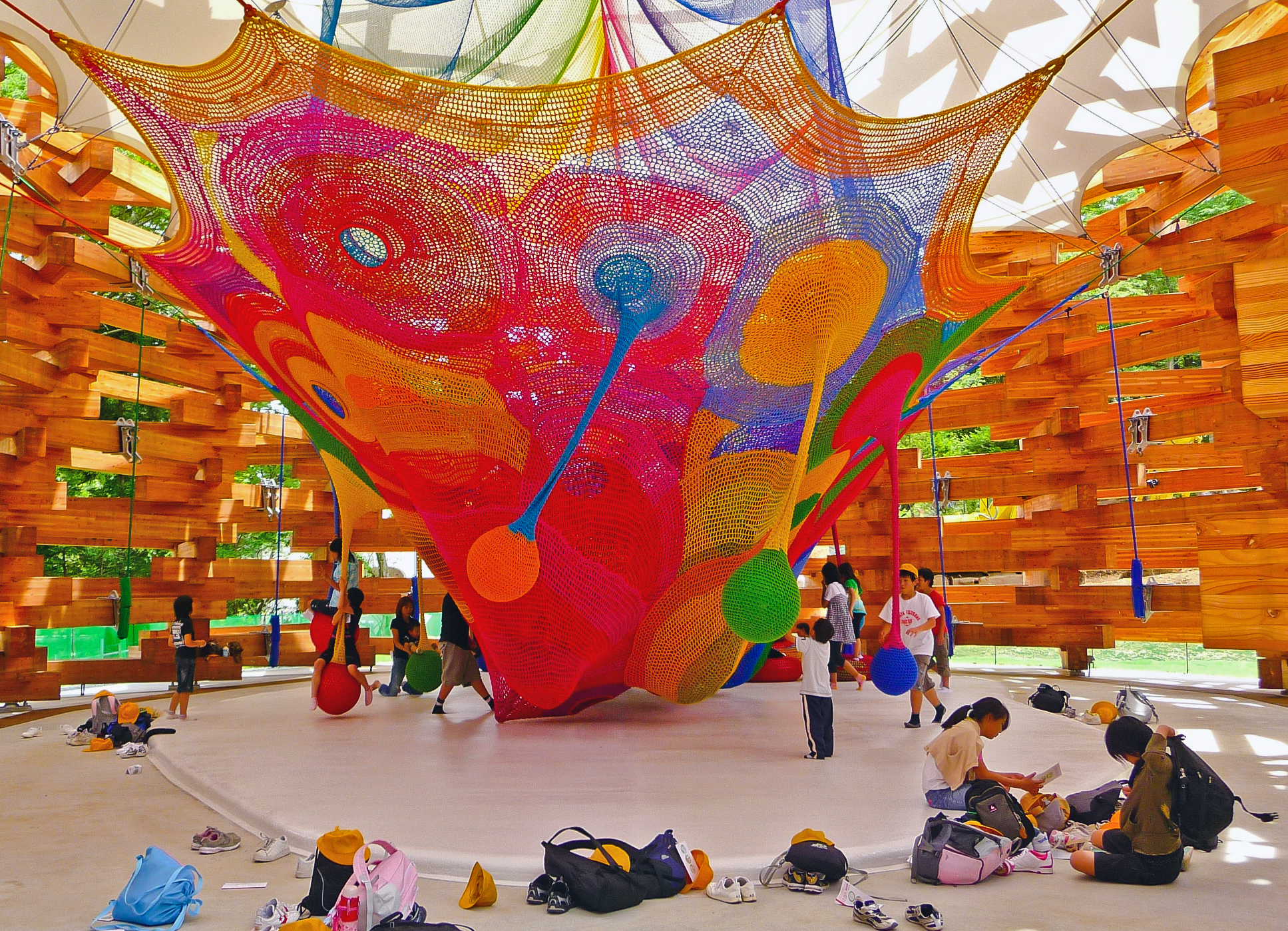
A playground in the park

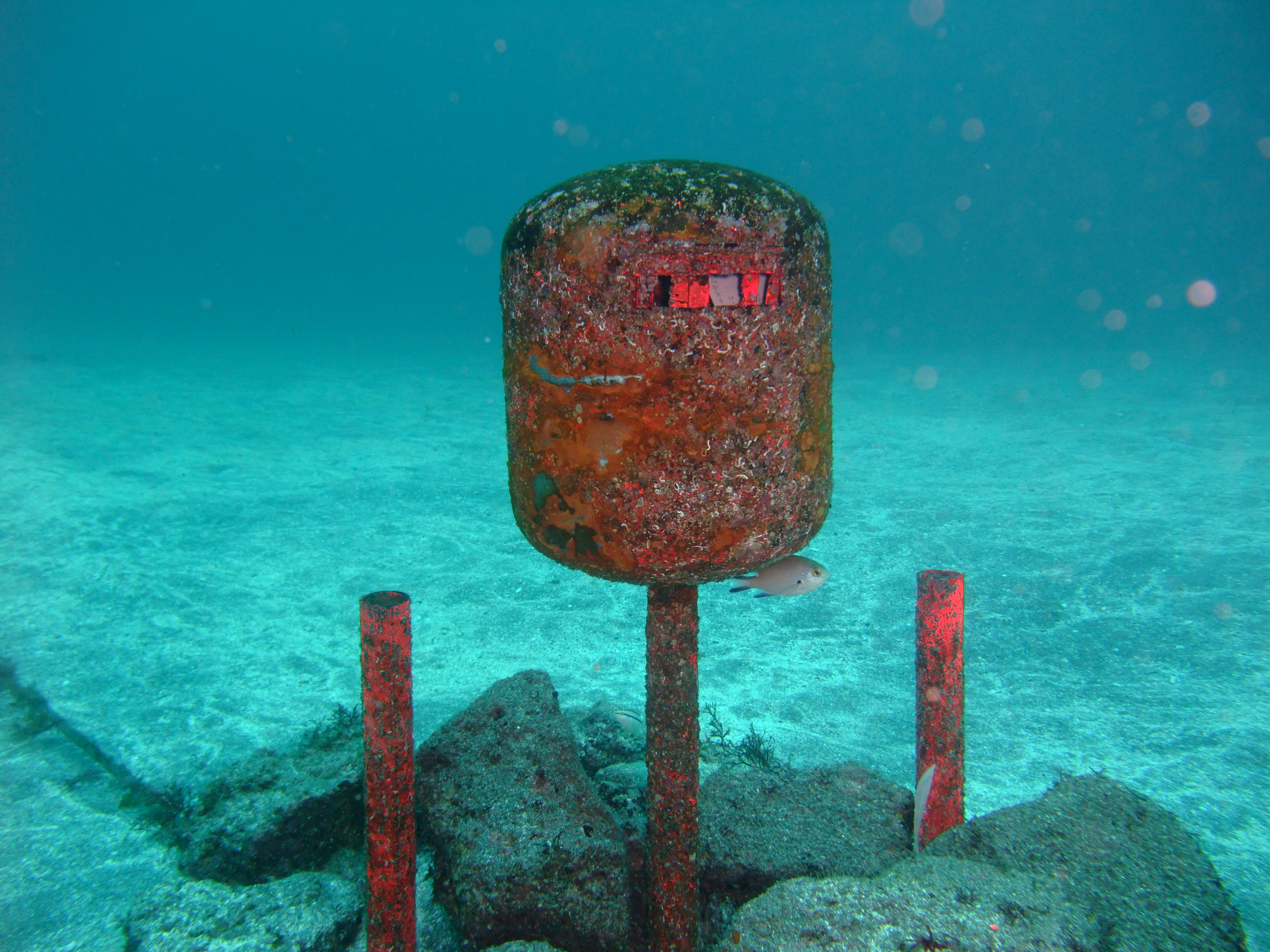
Underwater post box for divers

Fuji-Hakone-Izu National Park is divided into four general areas:

1. Mount Fuji area

- Mount Fuji
- Shiraito Falls
- Fuji Five Lakes
- Aokigahara
- Lake Tanuki

2. Hakone area

- Old Tokaido Road
- Hakone Botanical Garden of Wetlands
- Ashi-no-ko Lake (Lake Ashi)
- Ōwakudani
- Hakone Park

3. Izu Peninsula

- Mount Amagi
- Atami hot springs
- Atagawa Tropical & Alligator Garden
- Jogasaki coast

4. Izu Islands

- Izu Ōshima
- To-shima
- Nii-jima
- Shikine-jima
- Kōzu-shima
- Miyake-jima
- Mikura-jima
- Hachijō-jima

The Izu islands are also a popular destination for scuba diving.

== See also ==
- List of national parks of Japan
