= Aokigahara =

Forest in Yamanashi Prefecture, Japan

Aokigahara 青木ヶ原 (Japanese)
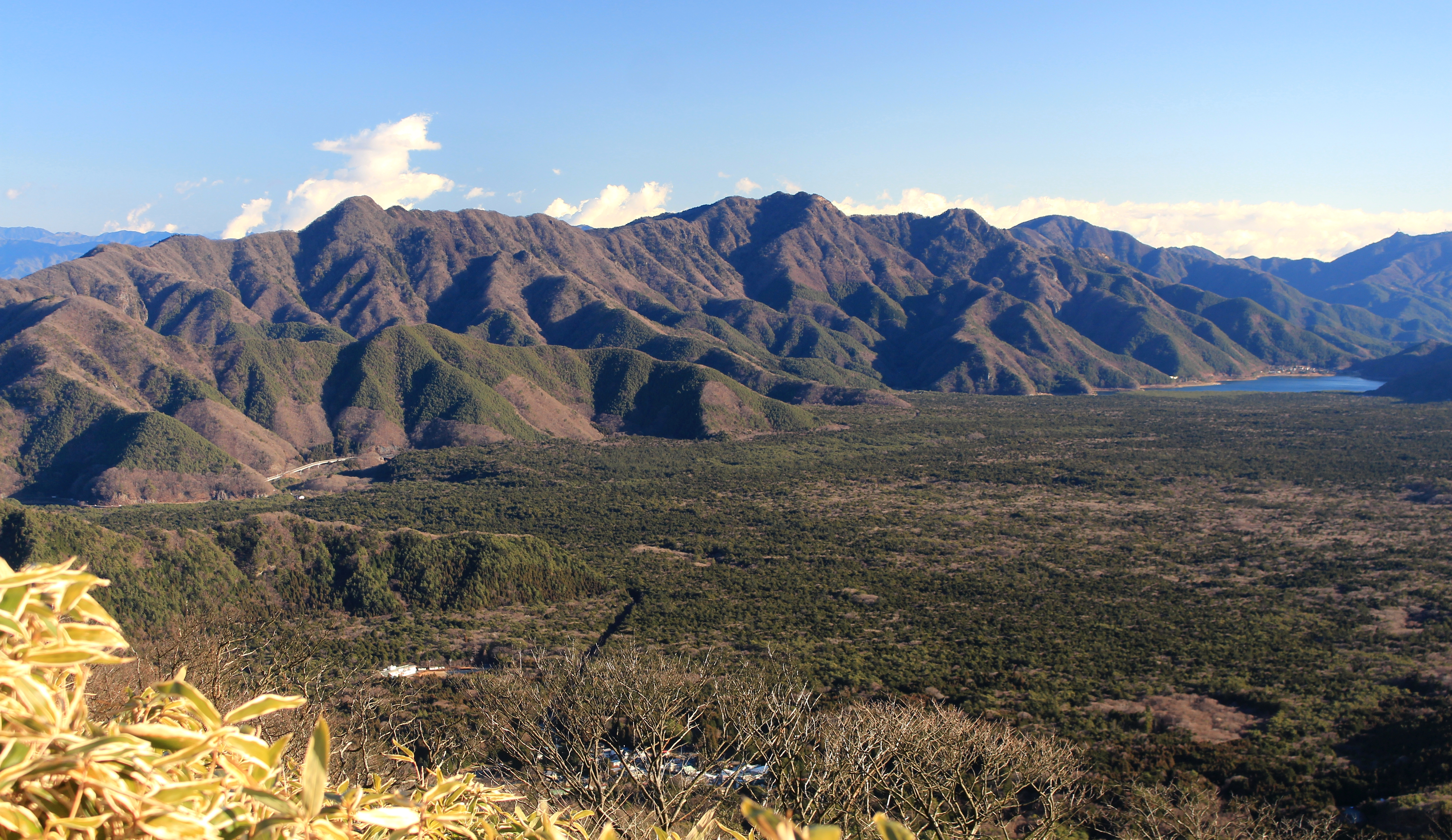
- Aokigahara, the Misaka Mountains and Saiko Lake, as seen from Mount Ryu of the Tenshi Mountains

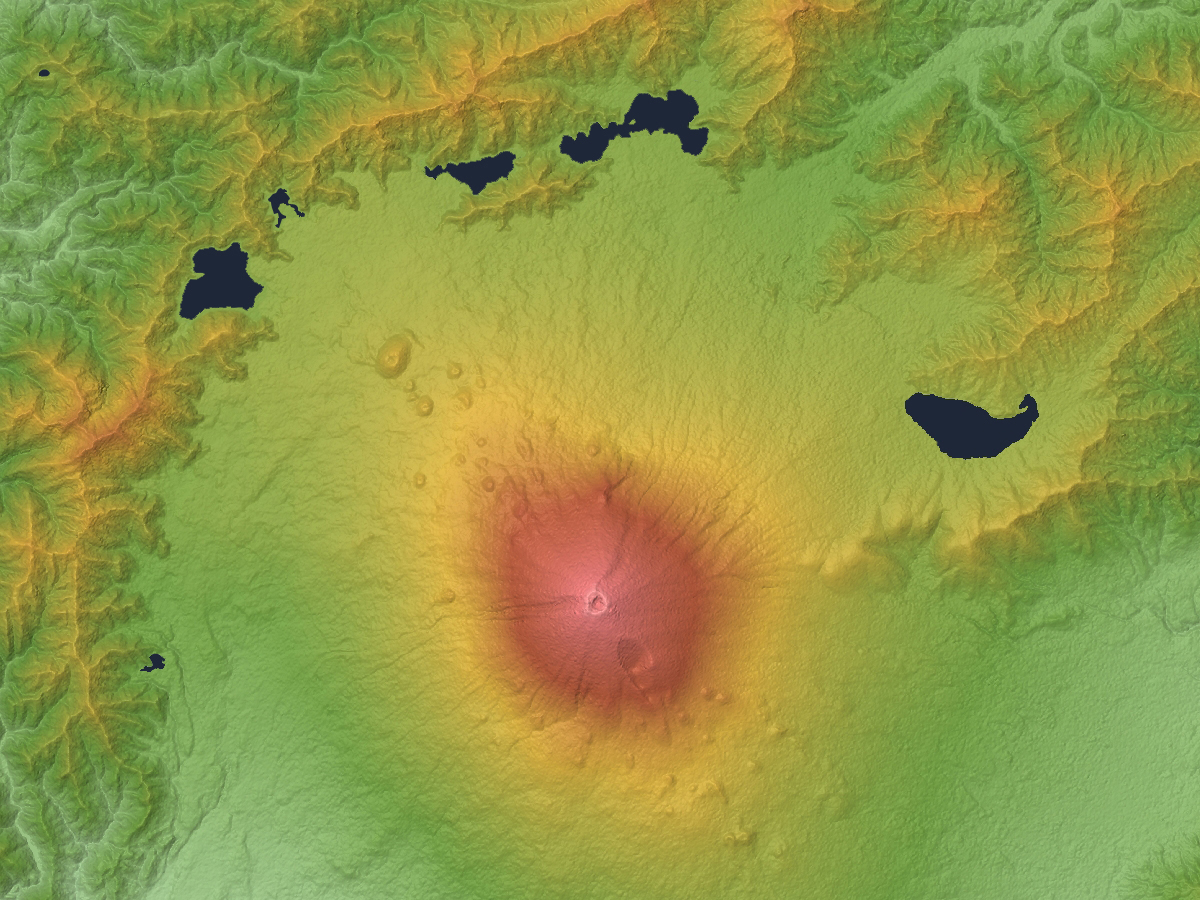
- Locations of Aokigahara and Mount Fuji

Ecology
- Realm: Palearctic
- Biome: Temperate broadleaf and mixed forest

Geography
- Area: 35 km^{2} (14 mi^{2})
- Country: Japan
- Prefecture: Yamanashi Prefecture
- Coordinates: 35°28′12″N 138°37′11″E

Conservation
- Conservation status: Relatively stable/Relatively intact

Aokigahara (青木ヶ原, 'Aucuba Tree Meadow'), also known as the Sea of Trees (樹海, Jukai), is a forest on the northwestern flank of Mount Fuji on the island of Honshu in Japan, thriving on 30 square kilometres (12 sq mi) of hardened lava laid down by the last major eruption of Mount Fuji in 864 AD. The western edge of Aokigahara, where there are several caves that fill with ice in winter, is a popular destination for tourists and school trips. Parts of Aokigahara are very dense, and the porous lava rock absorbs sound, contributing to a sense of solitude that some visitors attribute to the forest.

The forest has a historical reputation as a home to yūrei: ghosts of the dead in Japanese mythology. At least since the 1960s, Aokigahara has become associated with suicide, eventually becoming known in English by the nickname "Suicide Forest" and gaining a reputation as one of the world's most-used suicide sites. Because of this, signs at the head of some trails urge suicidal visitors to think of their families and contact a suicide prevention association.

== Geography ==
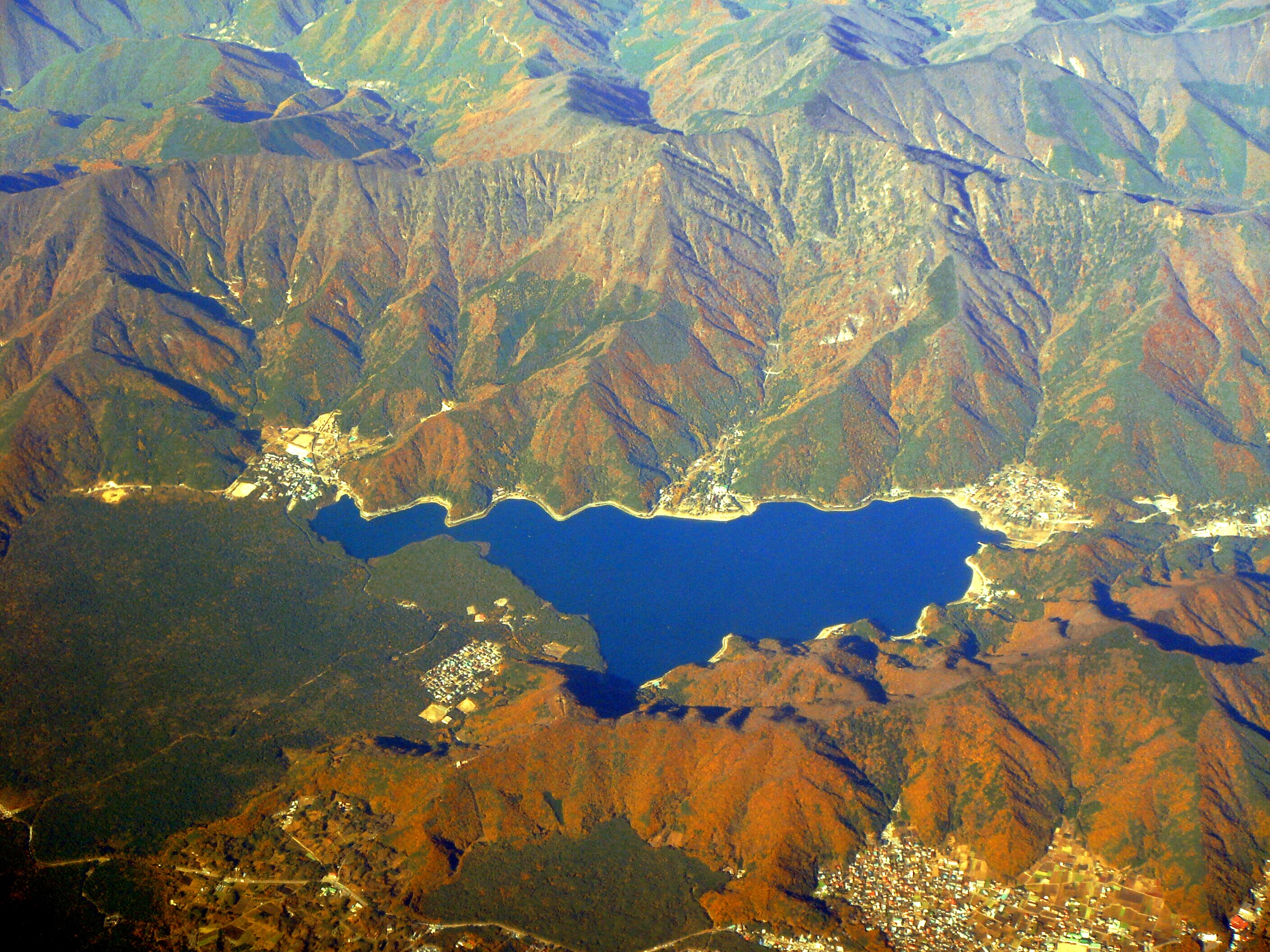
Aokigahara (left) and Saiko Lake

The forest floor mostly consists of volcanic rock. Designated trails lead to several tourist attractions such as the Narusawa Ice Cave, Fugaku Wind Cave and Lake Sai Bat Cave which are three larger lava caves near Mount Fuji, the ice cave being frozen year-round.

Aokigahara has been portrayed as a place where navigational compasses go haywire. Needles of magnetic compasses will sometimes point away from north if placed directly on the lava, aligning with the rock's natural magnetism, which varies in iron content and strength by location. However, the compass behaves as expected when held at a normal height. The Japan Ground Self-Defense Force has conducted its Ranger Courses including navigation training in the forest since 1956.

== Flora and fauna ==
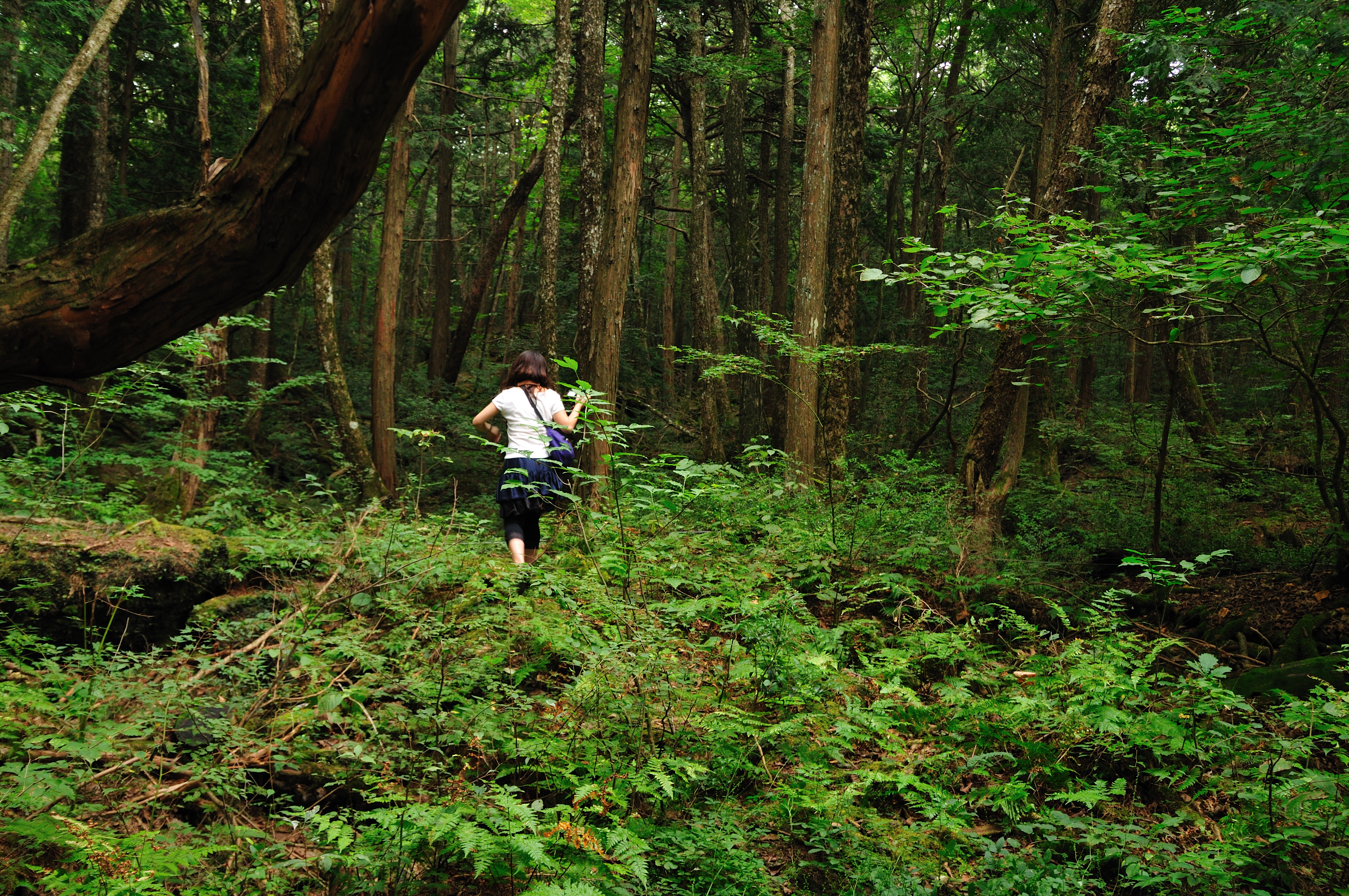
Aokigahara is located near Mount Fuji, in Yamanashi Prefecture.

Aokigahara maintains a thriving temperate ecosystem, with numerous native plants and animals. Mammals include the Asiatic black bear, Dsinezumi shrew, small Japanese mole, greater horseshoe, greater tube-nosed and eastern long-fingered bats, mice and brown rats, Honshū sika deer, red fox, masked palm civet, wild boar, Japanese badger, dormouse, dwarf flying squirrel, hare, macaque, marten, mink, raccoon dog, serow, shrewmole, squirrel and weasel. Birds include great tit, willow and long-tailed tits, great spotted and Japanese pygmy woodpeckers, bush-warbler, Eurasian jay, warbling white-eye, Japanese, brown-headed and Siberian thrushes, Hodgson's hawk-cuckoo, Japanese grosbeak, lesser and common cuckoos, black-faced bunting and the oriental turtle dove.

Herpetofauna in the region includes the black-spotted frog (Pelophylax nigromaculatus), Japanese five-lined skink (Plestiodon finitimus), Japanese forest ratsnake (Euprepiophis conspicillata), tiger keelback (Rhabdophis tigrinus) and the montane brown frog (Rana ornativentris).

Invertebrates include ground beetles and other insects, including many species of lepidopterans (even within the forest's interior), such as the silver-washed fritillary (Argynnis paphia), Chrysozephyrus smaragdinus, the holly blue (Celastrina argiolus), C. sugitanii, Curetis acuta, Favonius jezoensis, Neptis sappho, Parantica sita and Polygonia c-album are found.

The forest is composed of a variety of conifers and broad-leaved trees and shrubs, including Chamaecyparis obtusa, Cryptomeria japonica, Pinus densiflora and P. parviflora, Tsuga sieboldii, Japanese maples (including Acer distylum, A. micranthum, A. sieboldianum and A. tschonoskii), Betula grossa, Chengiopanax sciadophylloides (or Acanthopanax sciadophylloides or Eleutherococcus), Clethra barbinervis, Enkianthus campanulatus, Euonymus macropterus, Ilex pedunculosa, I. macropoda, Pieris japonica, Prunus jamasakura, Quercus mongolica var. crispula, Rhododendron dilatatum, Skimmia japonica f. repens, Sorbus commixta (or Sorbus americana ssp. japonica) and Toxicodendron trichocarpum (or Rhus trichocarpa). The dominant tree species between 1,000 and 1,800 metres of altitude is Tsuga diversifolia and from 1,800 to 2,200 metres is Abies veitchii.

Deeper in the forest, there are many herbaceous and flowering plants, including Artemisia princeps, Cirsium nipponicum var. incomptum, Corydalis incisa, Erigeron annuus, Geranium nepalense, Kalimeris pinnatifida, Maianthemum dilatatum, Oplismenus undulatifolius and Reynoutria japonica (syn. Polygonum cuspidatum). There are also the myco-heterotrophic Monotropastrum humile, numerous liverworts, mosses and many ferns. Additionally, the forests are outlined with many small annual and perennial species that self-sow along the sunnier fringes, along with young sprouts of the larger trees and shrubs.

== Suicides ==
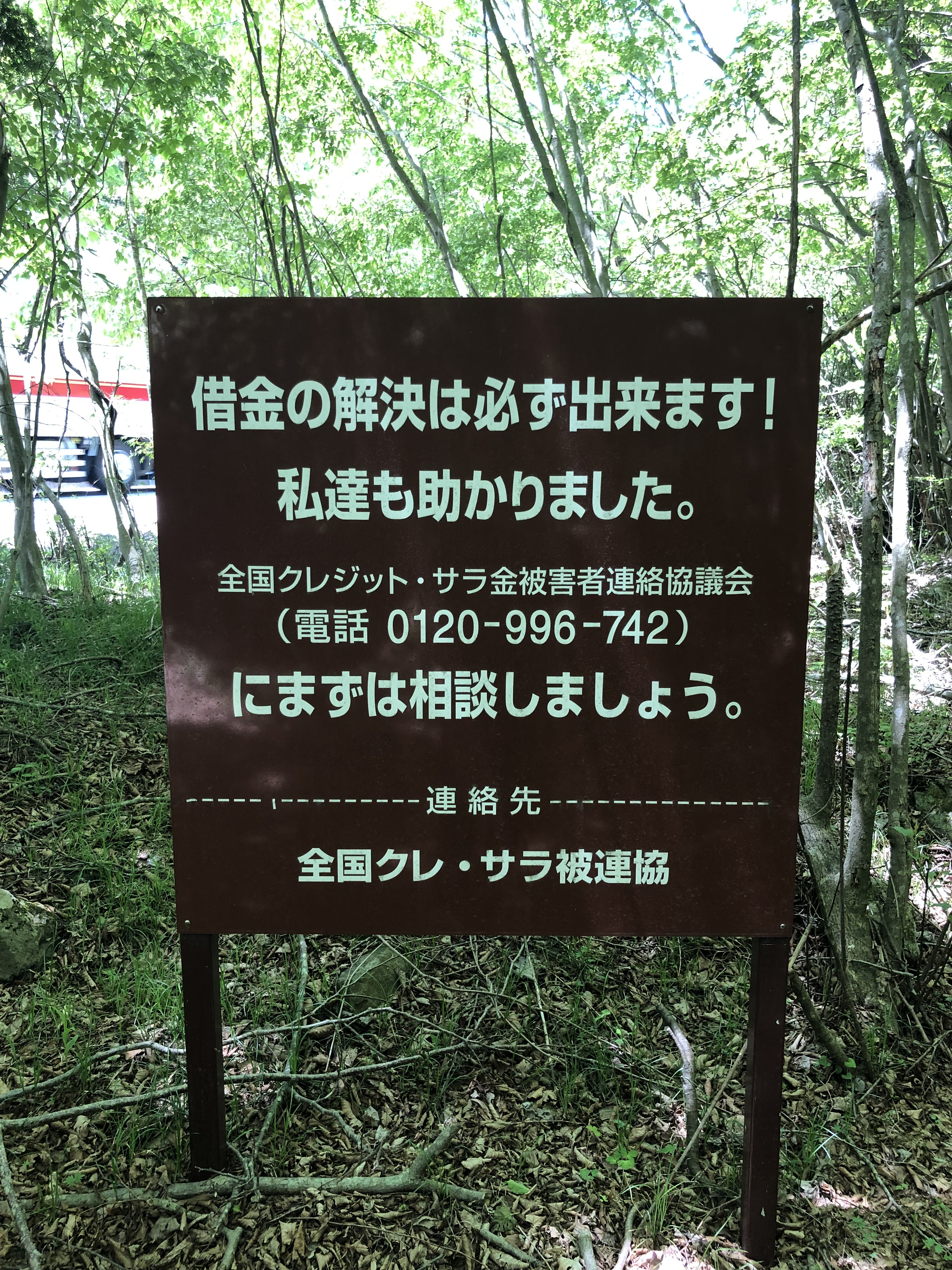
Sign urging people contemplating suicide due to unmanageable debt to contact an organization that helps victims of predatory lenders

Aokigahara is sometimes referred to as the most popular site for suicide in Japan. In 2003, 105 bodies were found in the forest, exceeding the previous record of 78 in 2002. In 2010, the police recorded 54 confirmed suicides out of more than 200 attempts. Suicides are said to increase during March, the end of the fiscal year in Japan. As of 2011, the most common means of suicide in the forest were hanging or drug overdose. Local officials have stopped publicizing the numbers in an attempt to decrease Aokigahara's association with suicide.

The rate of suicide has led officials to place a sign at the forest's entry urging suicidal visitors to seek help and not take their own lives. Annual body searches have been conducted by police, volunteers, and journalists since 1970.

The site's popularity has been attributed to Seichō Matsumoto's 1961 novel Nami no Tō (Tower of Waves). However, the history of suicide in Aokigahara predates the novel's publication, and the place has long been associated with death; ubasute may have been practiced there into the nineteenth century, and the forest is reputedly haunted by the yūrei of those left to die.

== References in media ==
Aokigahara has been referred to in numerous forms of entertainment and documentary media, including anime and manga, films, literature, music lyrics and video games; a drama-mystery film, The Sea of Trees (2015), takes place in the forest, as does American screenwriter Jason Zada's horror film The Forest (2016).

In late 2017, popular American YouTuber Logan Paul, who had earned over 15 million subscribers to his channel by 1 January 2018, uploaded a video in which he and several companions visited Aokigahara in order to document and explore the forest's supposed "creepy" qualities. While filming, the group discovered several personal items, including discarded sleeping bags and clothing, as well as what appeared to be disused campsites. They then unexpectedly came upon the body of a suicide victim, to which Paul exclaimed "I think there's someone hanging right there!", with him and his group subsequently approaching the corpse and filming it (blurring the face of the person, whose identity is a mystery); this video was then uploaded directly to Paul's channel, shocking many and receiving widespread condemnation. One member of the group could be heard saying they did not "feel good" as they viewed the corpse, to which Paul asked, jokingly, if this person had "never stood near a dead guy before". After receiving swift backlash, and even some praise for "raising suicide awareness", Paul stated that he was "misguided by shock and awe"; after removing the video, and filming a subsequent apology, Paul said that he "should have never posted the video" and "should have put the cameras down and stopped recording what we were going through…I'm ashamed of myself…I'm disappointed in myself."

Aokigahara was the subject of a BBC Radio 4 production, broadcast 10 September 2018, in which four poets traveled to the region to write and record poetry. The poets Arai Takako, Jordan A. Y. Smith, Osaki Sayaka, and Yotsumoto Yasuhiro co-authored a bilingual (Japanese/English) anthology of the poems and short writings on Aokigahara, titled Sea of Trees: Poetic Gateways to Aokigahara (ToPoJo Excursions, 2019).

American playwright Kristine Haruna Lee wrote and staged a play, Suicide Forest, in March 2019. It addressed suicide in the United States and in Japan, and references Aokigahara.

Australian psychedelic rock band King Gizzard & the Lizard Wizard were originally named "Sea Of Trees" after Aokigahara. Although the name did not stick, the group would release a song with the same name on their debut album 12 Bar Bruise (2012).

American R&B singer Jhené Aiko included a song called "Jukai" as the second track on her 2017 album Trip, using the forest as reference for an exploration of suicide and rebirth.

Aokigahara is also the name of Mai Shiranui's stage in Fatal Fury 2, consisting of a raft next to the forest. An updated version of the stage was included in a teaser trailer for her guest appearance in Street Fighter 6.

== See also ==
- Copycat suicide
- List of suicide sites
- Lover's Leap
- Suicide bridge
