= Lake Sai Bat Cave =

Cave in Japan

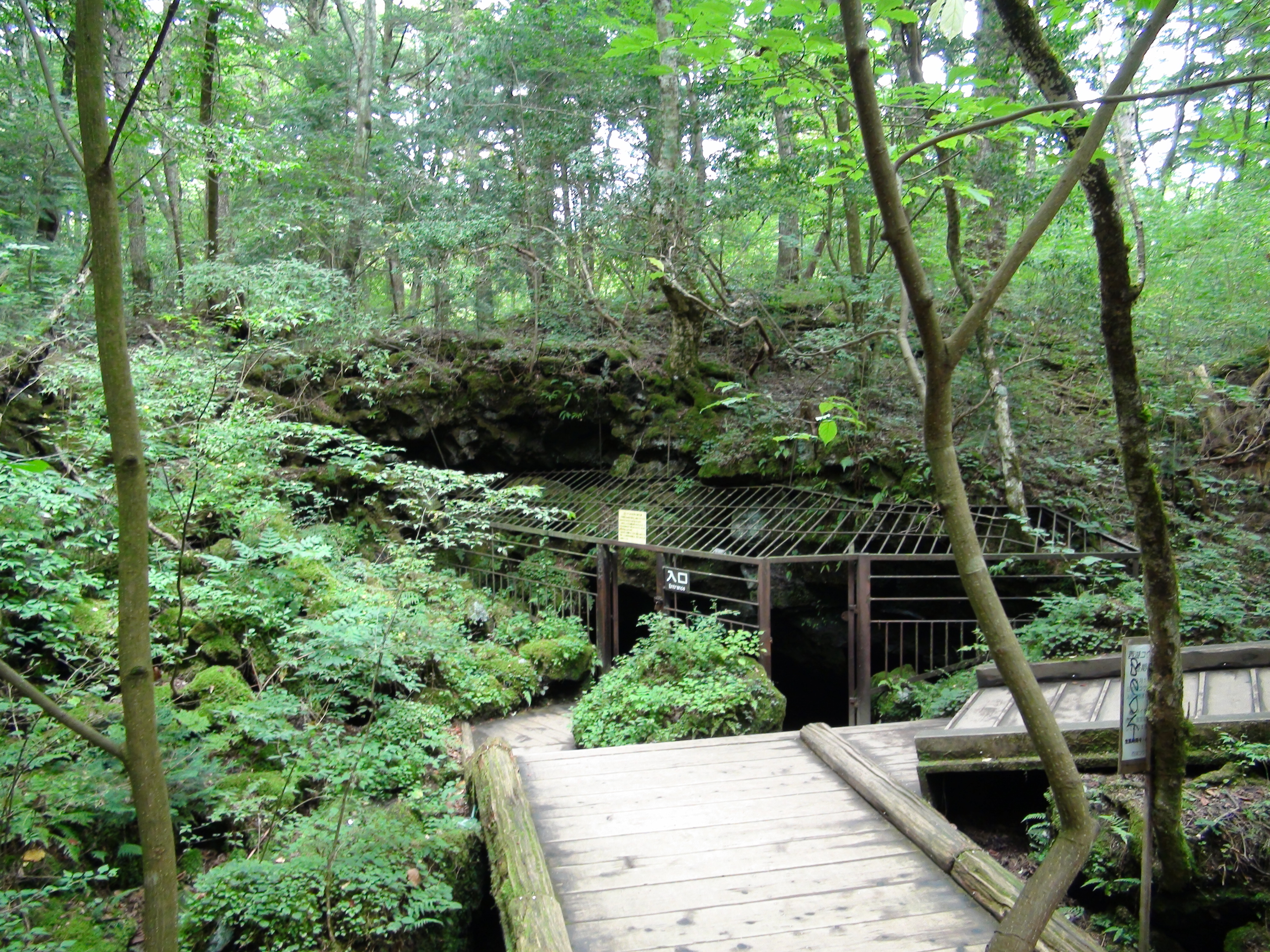
The entrance to the cave

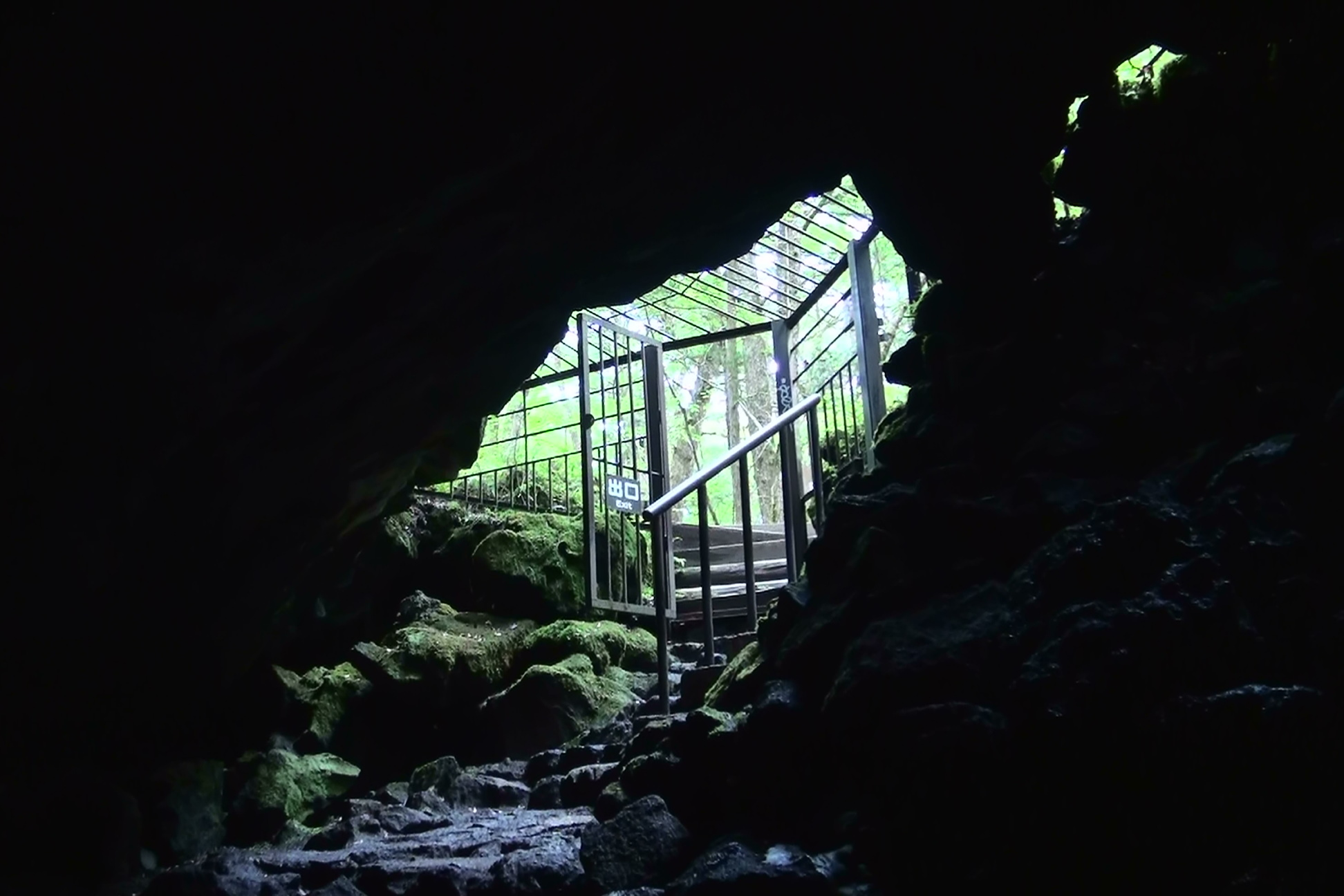
The entrance viewed from inside the cave

Lake Sai Bat Cave (Japanese: 西湖蝙蝠穴, Saiko Kōmori Ana) is the largest of the several lava tubes that are near Lake Sai, in the Aokigahara forest on the northern side of Mount Fuji, Japan. It is known as a cave where visitors can observe the bats which live there.

== Caves in Aokigahara Forest ==
In the Aokigahara forest, that was created by the lava flow of the 864 A.D. eruption of Mt. Fuji, there are several lava tubes, of which the major three are:

- Narusawa Ice Cave, in Narusawa Village, Yamanashi Prefecture
- Fugaku Wind Cave, in Fujikawaguchiko Town, Yamanashi Pref.
- Lake Sai Bat Cave, also in Fujikawaguchiko Town, Yamanashi Prefecture

All three were designated as Natural Monuments of Japan in 1929.

== Lake Sai Bat Cave ==
The Lake Sai Bat Cave is 386.5 meters long and is the largest of the three major caves in Aokigahara. It is located at 925 meters above sea level.

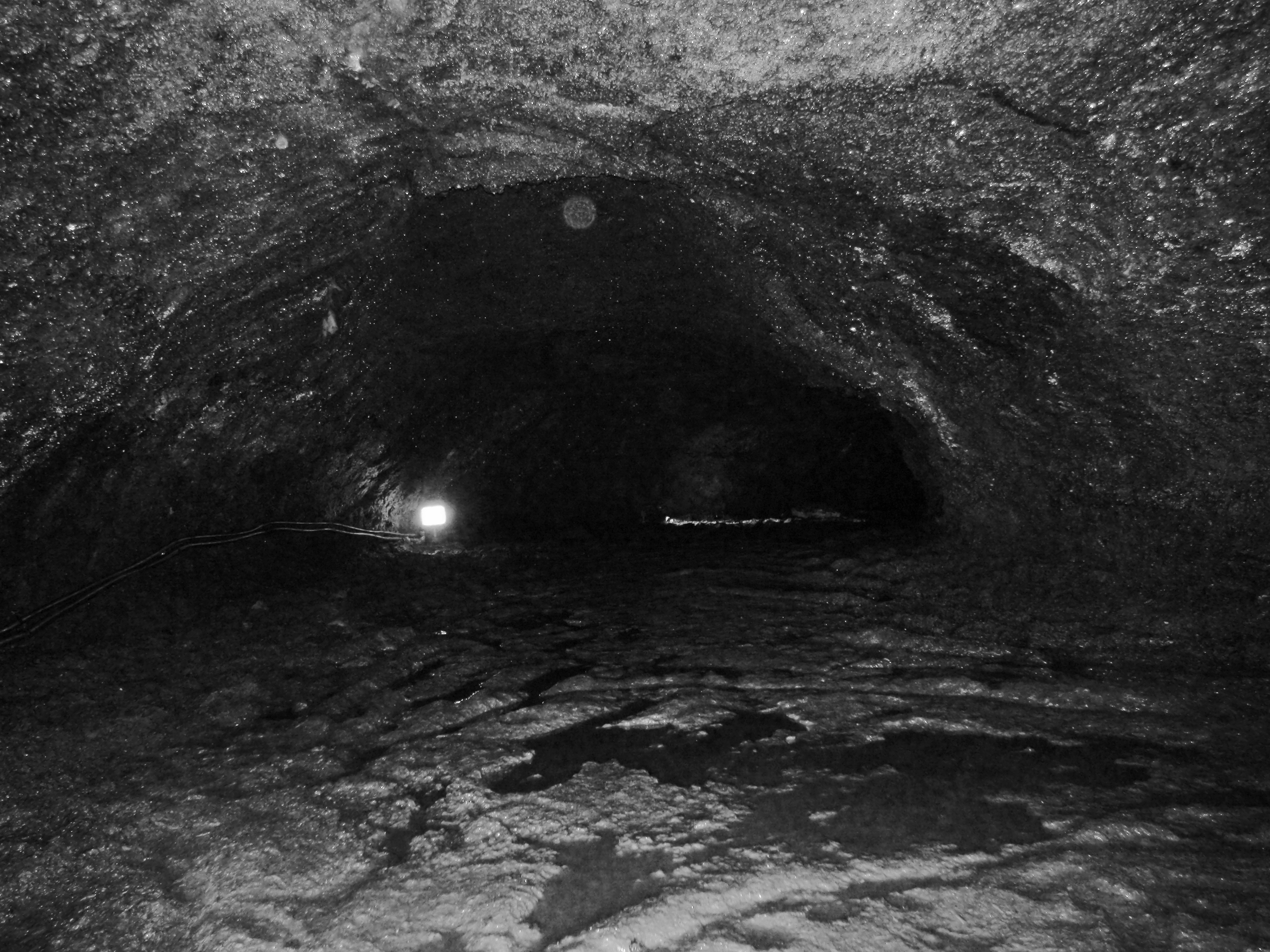
Inside the cave

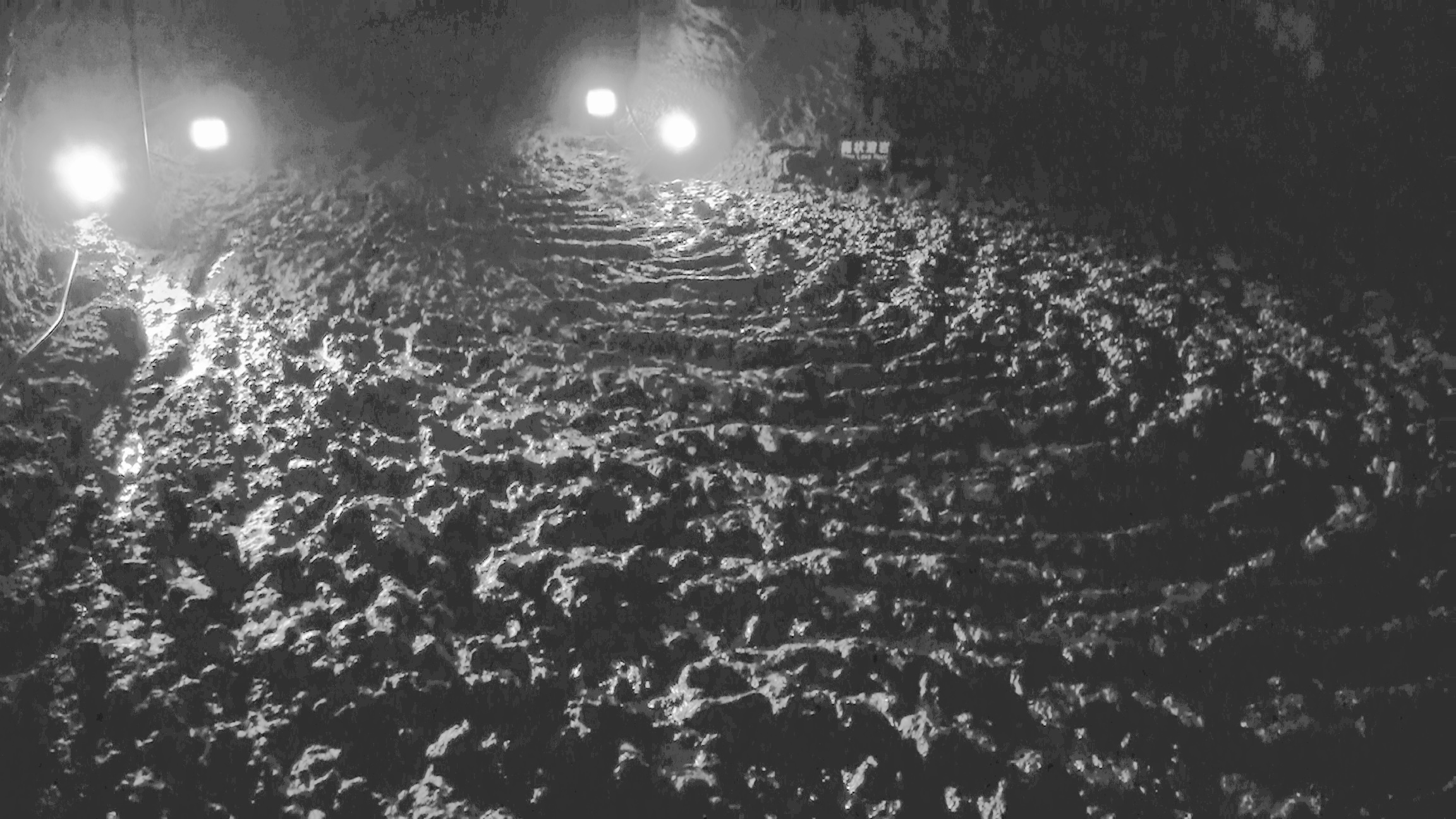
Corded lava of Lake Sai Bat Cave

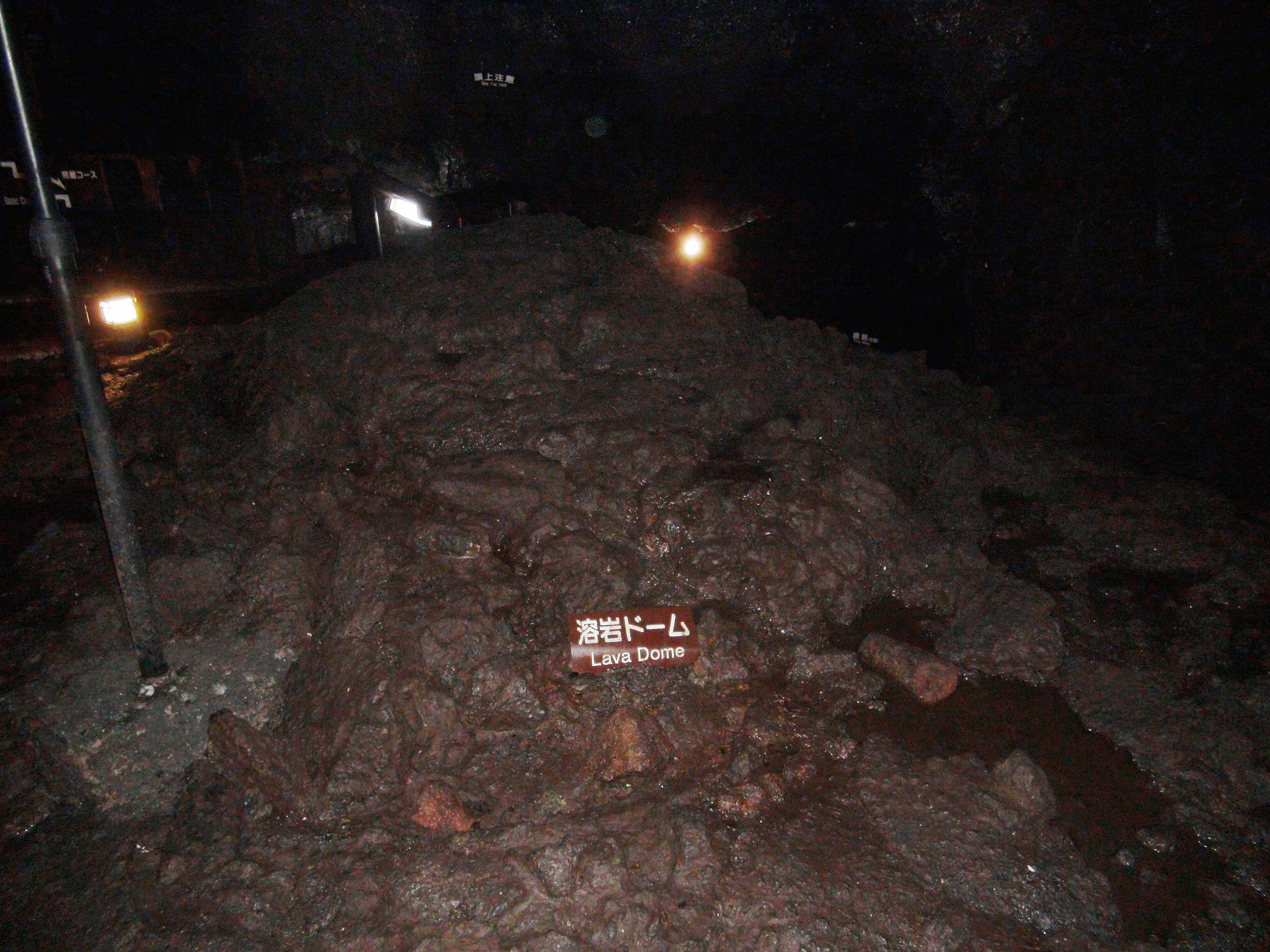
A lava dome

== Bats ==
The visitors to the Saiko Bat Cave can observe about 500 bats which live in there. The bats are of five kinds:

- Greater horseshoe bat
- Little Japanese horseshoe bat
- Eastern long-fingered bat
- Brown long-eared bat
- Japanese long-eared bat
- Hilgendorf's tube-nosed bat
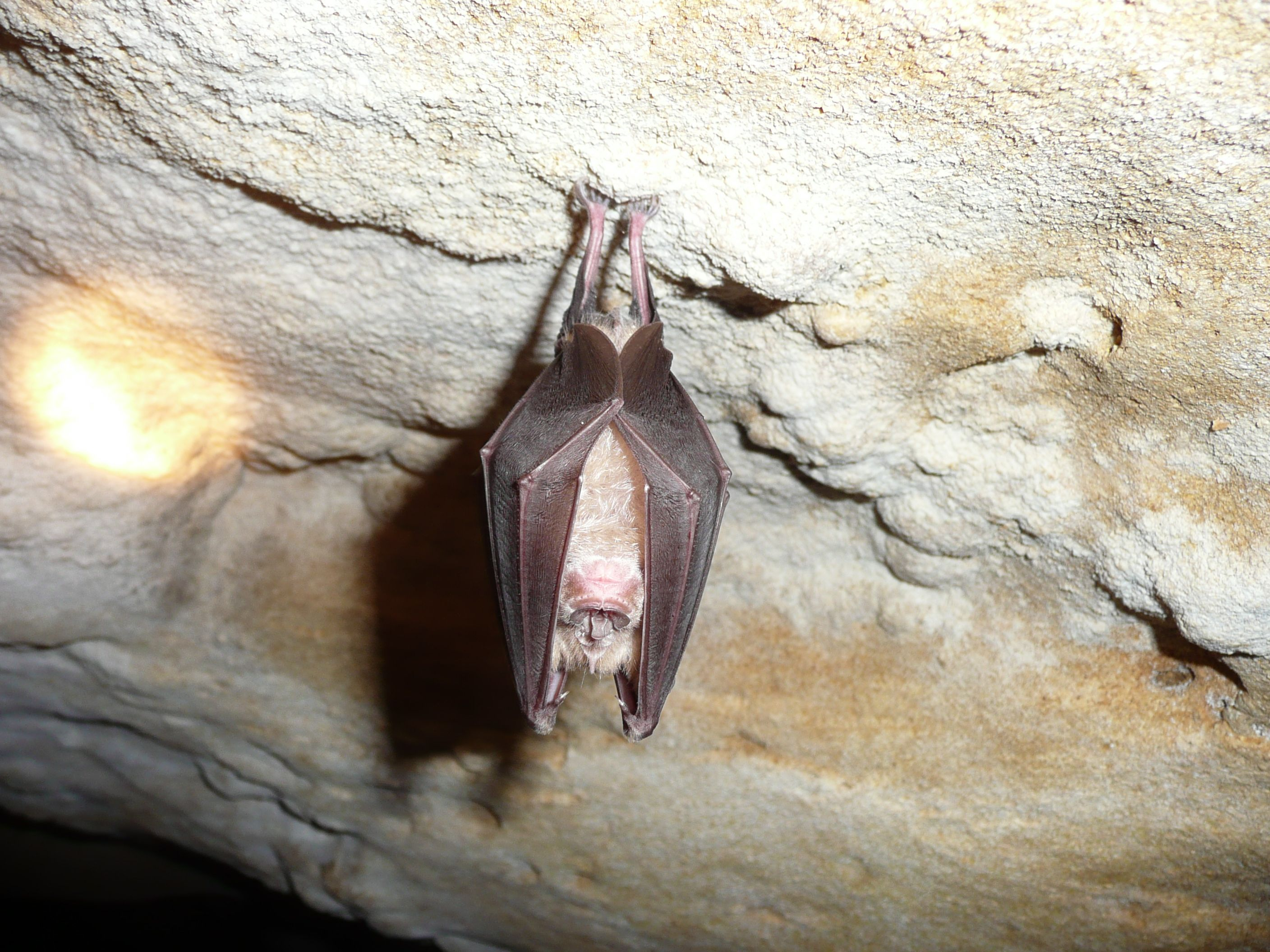
A Greater horseshoe bat in the cave

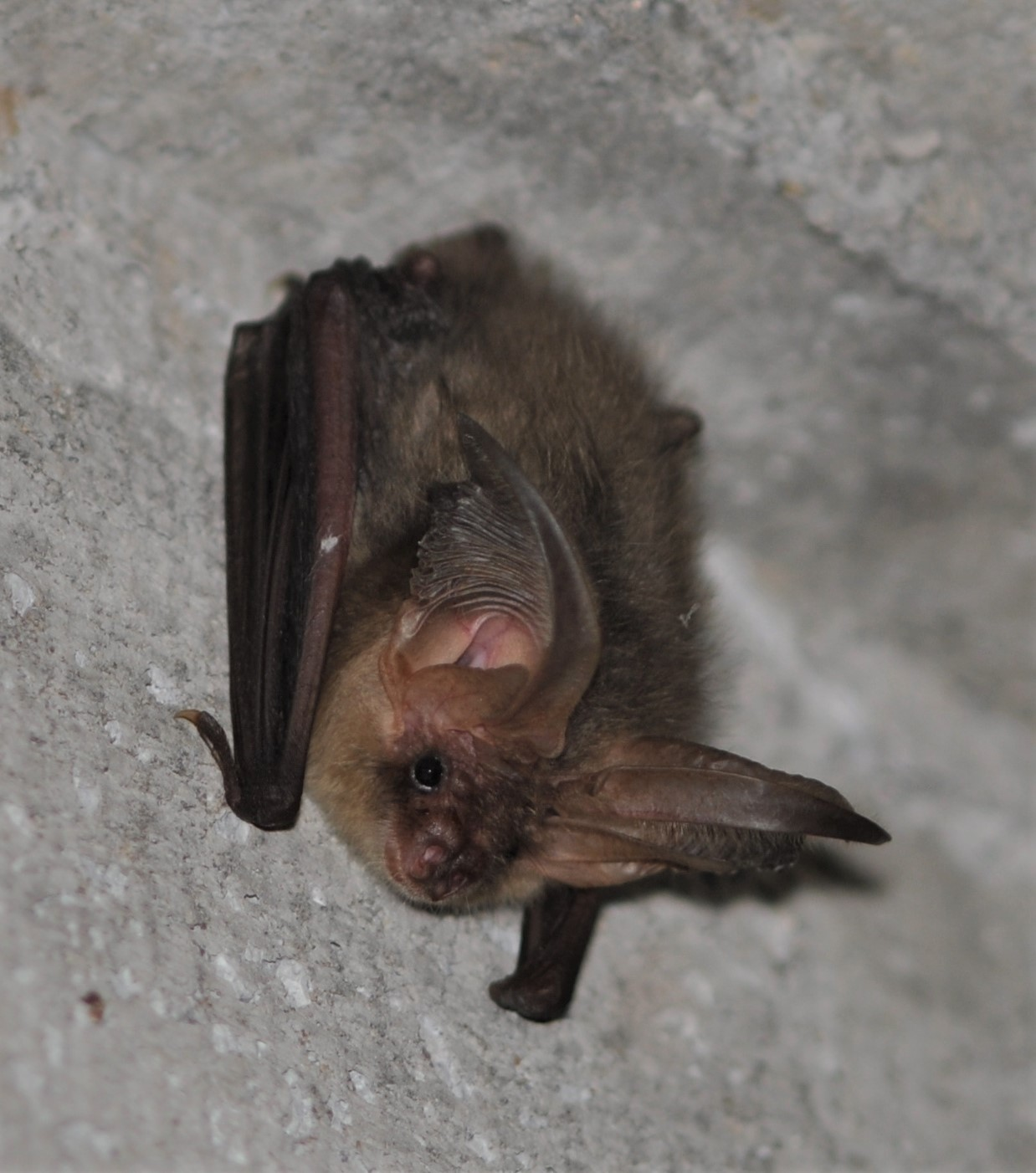
A Brown long-eared bat

== Lake Sai Nature Center ==
Lake Sai Nature Center was built recently next to the entrance of the Bat Cave. Walking tours through Aokigahara Forest can be arranged with the Fujikawaguchiko, Yamanashi-approved tour guides. Next to the Nature Center is the exhibition hall of Kunimasu trout which was declared extinct ca. 1945 up north in Lake Tazawa, Akita Prefecture, but was discovered in Lake Sai in 2010.

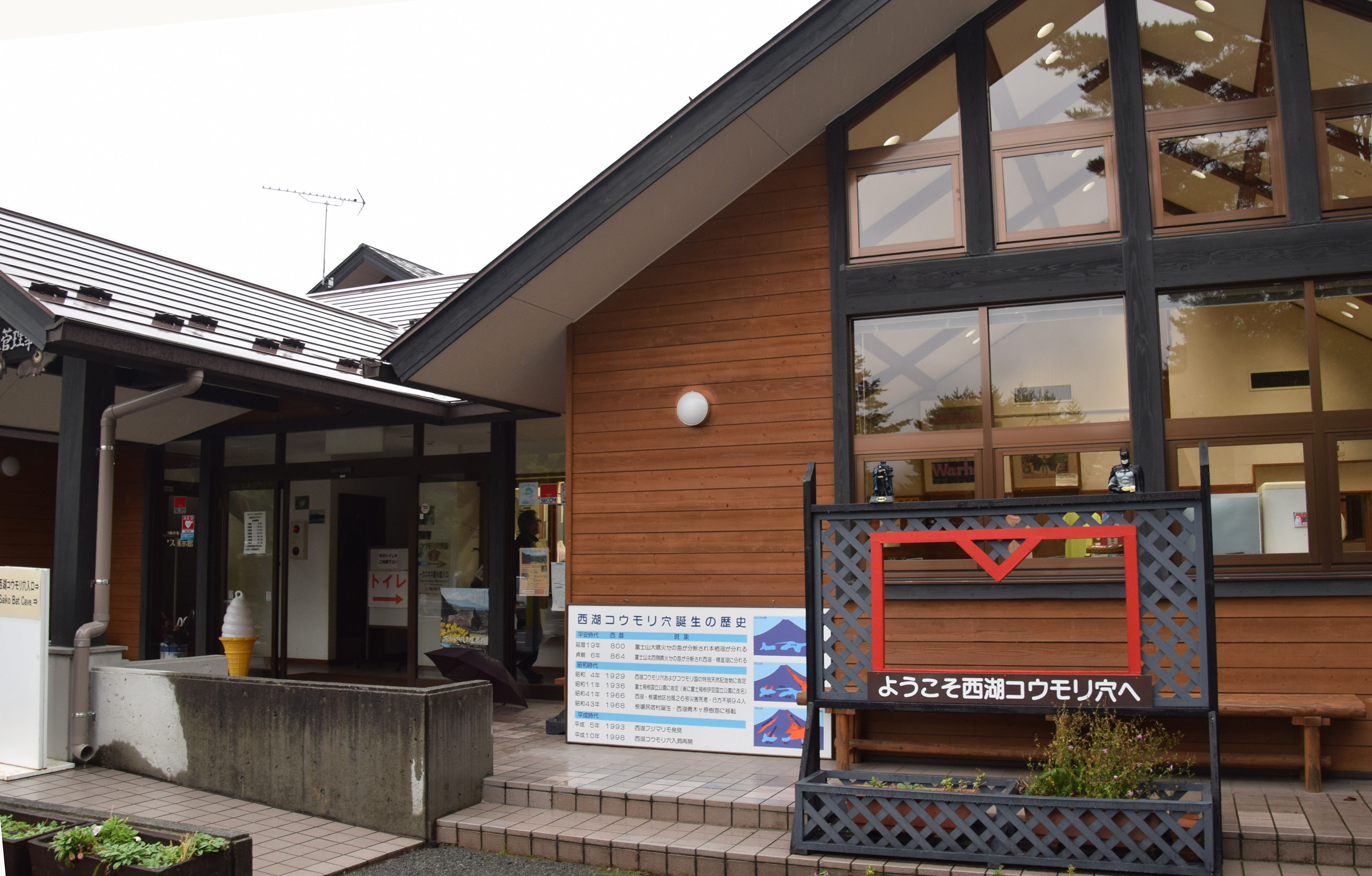
Lake Sai Nature Center

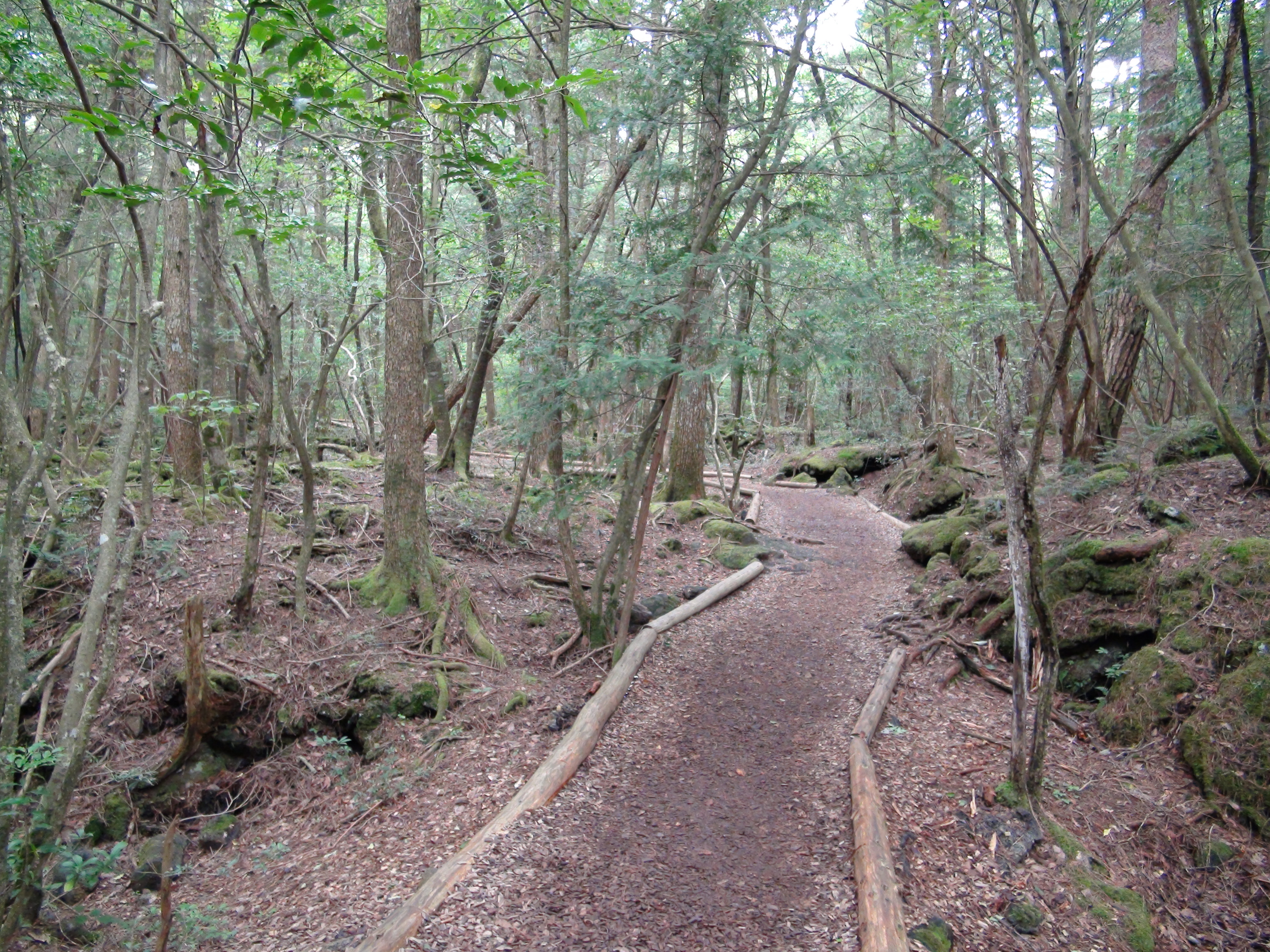
Walking tour of the Aokigahara Forest

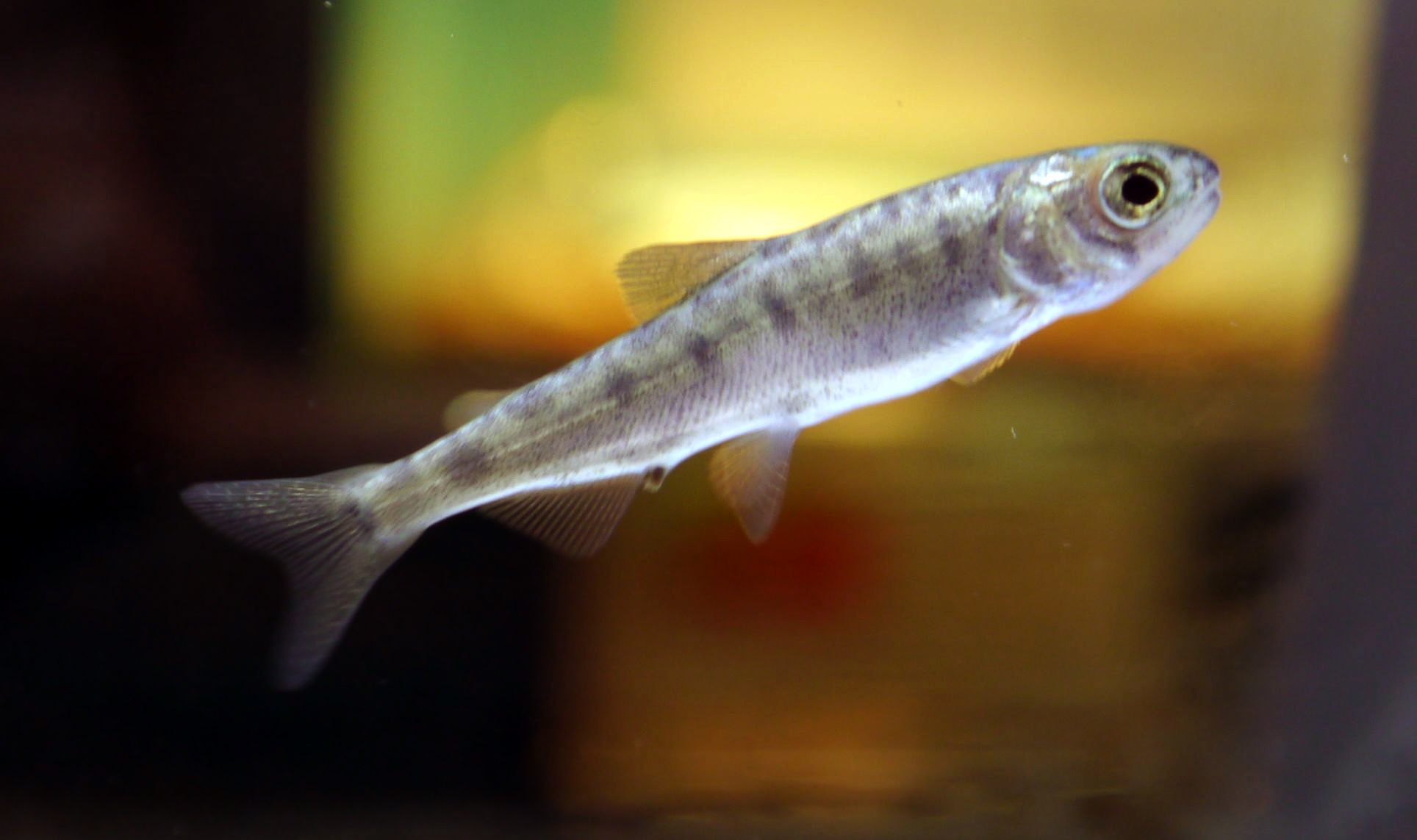
Kunimasu trout

== Transportation ==
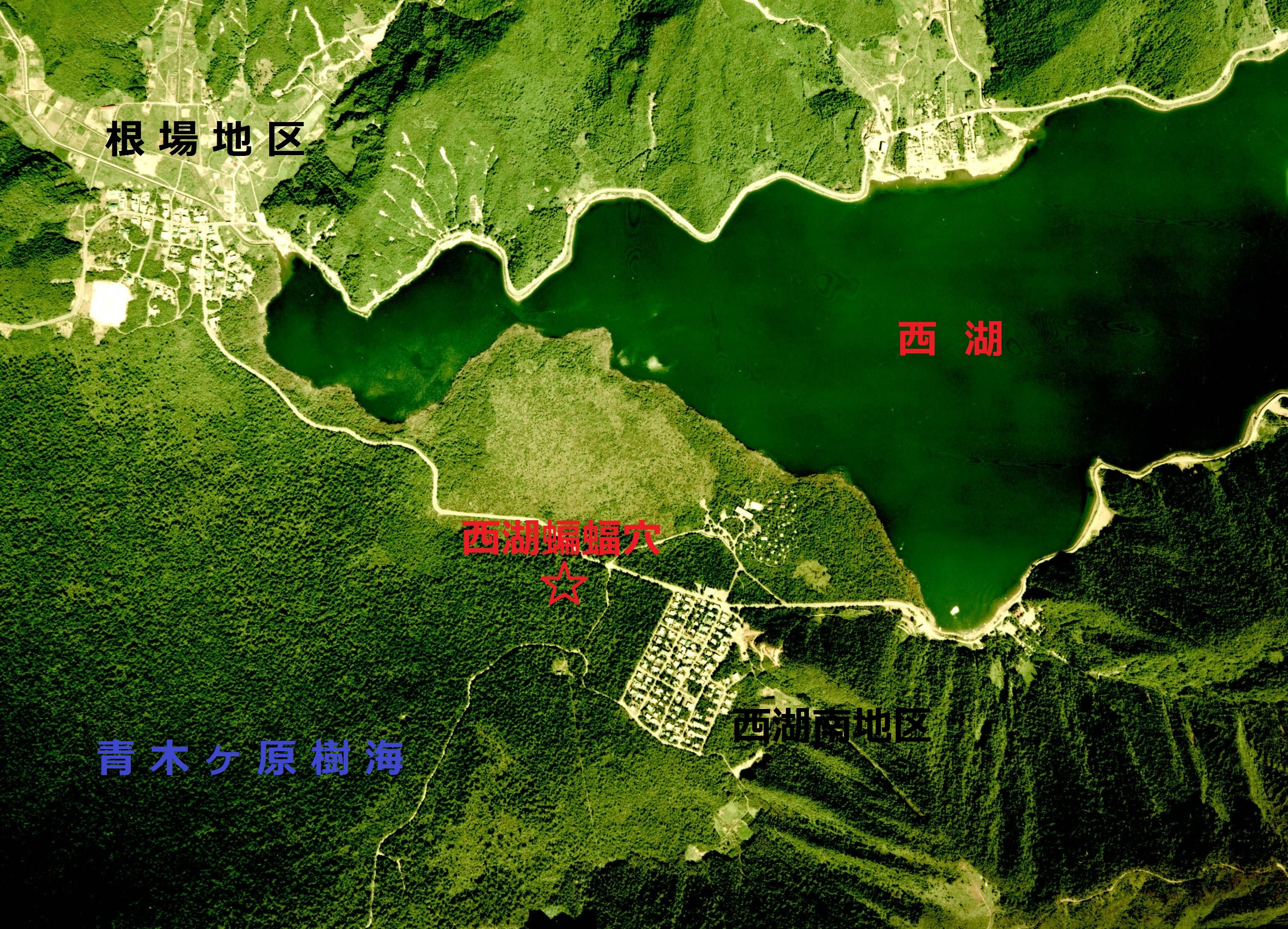
Location of Lake Sai Bat Cave (西湖蝙蝠穴 in red) relative to Lake Sai (西湖 in red) and Aokigahara Forest (青木ヶ原樹海 in blue)

Public bus transportation is available from Kawaguchiko Station of Fujikyūkō railway. By car, 13.1 km (about 25 minutes) on Japan National Route 139, from Lake Kawaguchi exit of Chūō Expressway.

== See also ==
- Fugaku Wind Cave
- Narusawa Ice Cave
