= Fugaku Wind Cave =

Cave in Japan

Coordinates: 35°28′39″N 138°39′27″E

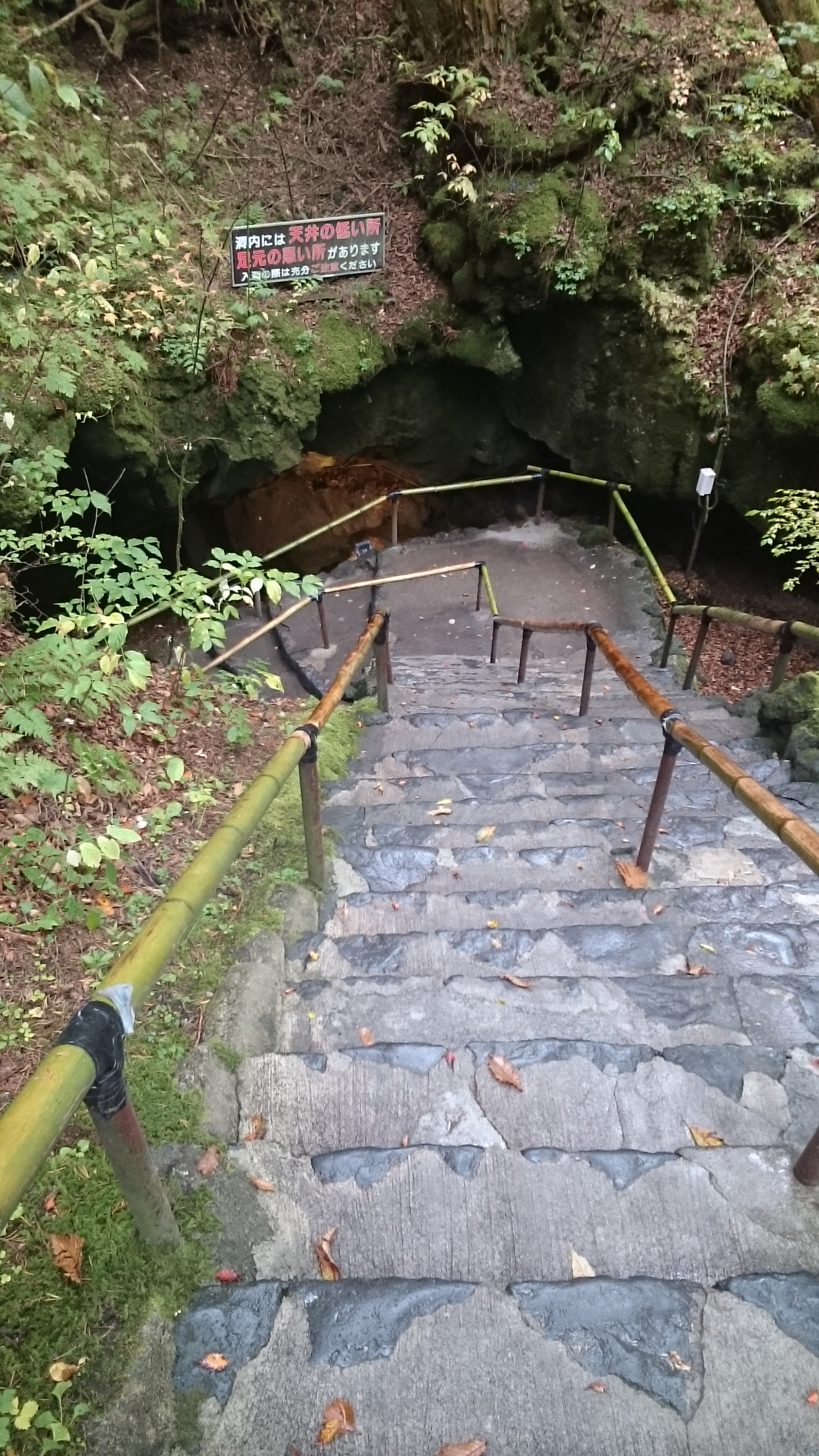
Fugaku Wind Cave is entered by walking down the stairs.

Fugaku Wind Cave (Japanese: 富岳風穴) is a lava tube at the northern foot of Mount Fuji, Japan. It is the largest of the several lava tubes that are found in the Aokigahara forest in Fujikawaguchiko Town, Yamanashi Prefecture.

== Aokigahara Forest ==
The 864 A.D. eruption of Mount Fuji brought huge lava flows, creating Lake Shōji and Lake Sai of the Fuji Five Lakes by dividing Se-no-umi into two, several cinder cones such as Ōmuro and Nagao mountains, and a large flat area now called the Aokigahara Forest. In this forest can be found several lava tubes, including:

- Narusawa Ice Cave, in Narusawa Village, Yamanashi Prefecture
- Fugaku Wind Cave, in Fujikawaguchiko Town, Yamanashi Prefecture.
- Lake Sai Bat Cave, in Fujikawaguchiko Town, Yamanashi Prefecture

All three were declared as Natural Monuments of Japan in 1929.

== Fugaku Wind Cave ==
Fugaku Wind Cave, 201 meters long with an average height of 8.7 meters, is found in the Aokigahara area. It is so named from Fugaku (富岳), a literary name for Mount Fuji (富士山), and Fūketsu (風穴) for wind cave, because there is enough circulation of air throughout the cave. The walls of the cave are mostly made of basalt.

Inside the cave, there are icicles even in summer, lava terraces and rope-like lava forms. From the Edo period to the Meiji period (ca. 1600 to 1900) this cave was used to keep the eggs of silk worms.

Fugaku Wind Cave along with Narusawa Ice Cave nearby is managed by Fuji Sightseeing Industry Co. of Fuji Express Group (富士急グループ). The souvenir shop at the entrance was renovated recently and opened in 2012, as "Wood Station Wind Cave".

== Transportation ==
Fugaku Wind Cave can be accessed from Japan National Route 139 on the south side (on Mt. Fuji side).

== See also ==
- Narusawa Ice Cave
- Lake Sai Bat Cave

== Gallery ==
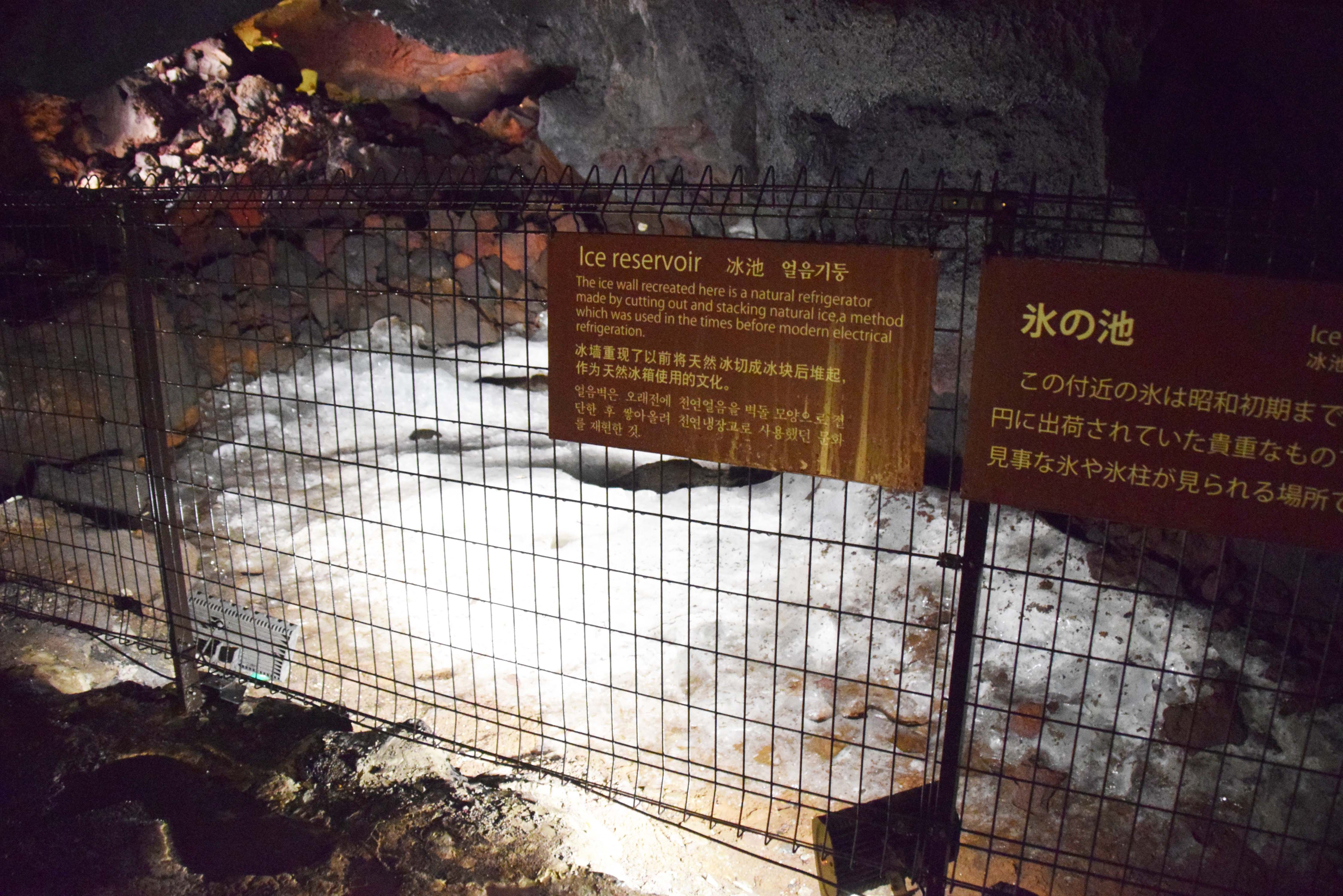
Ice pond

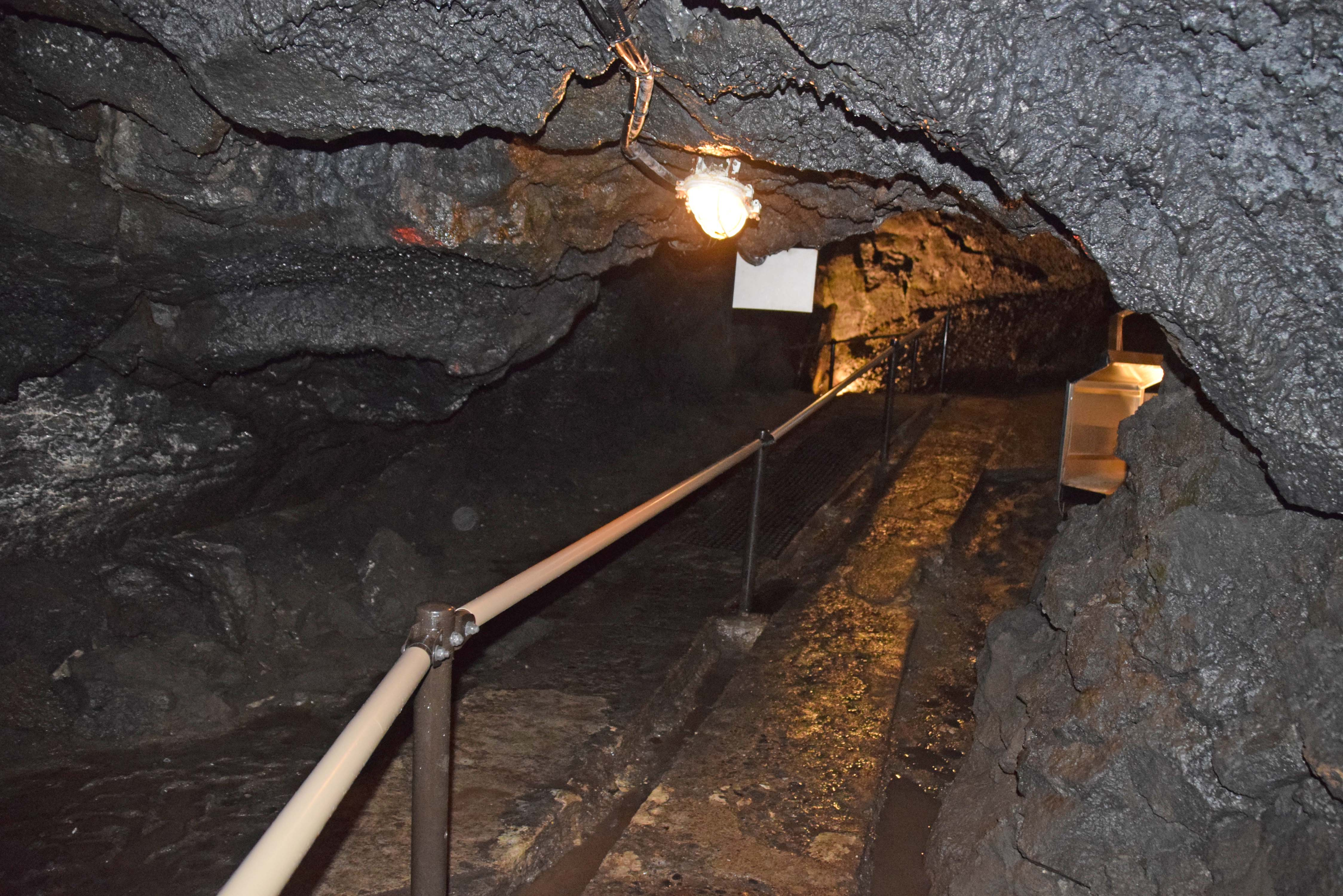
Walking through the cave

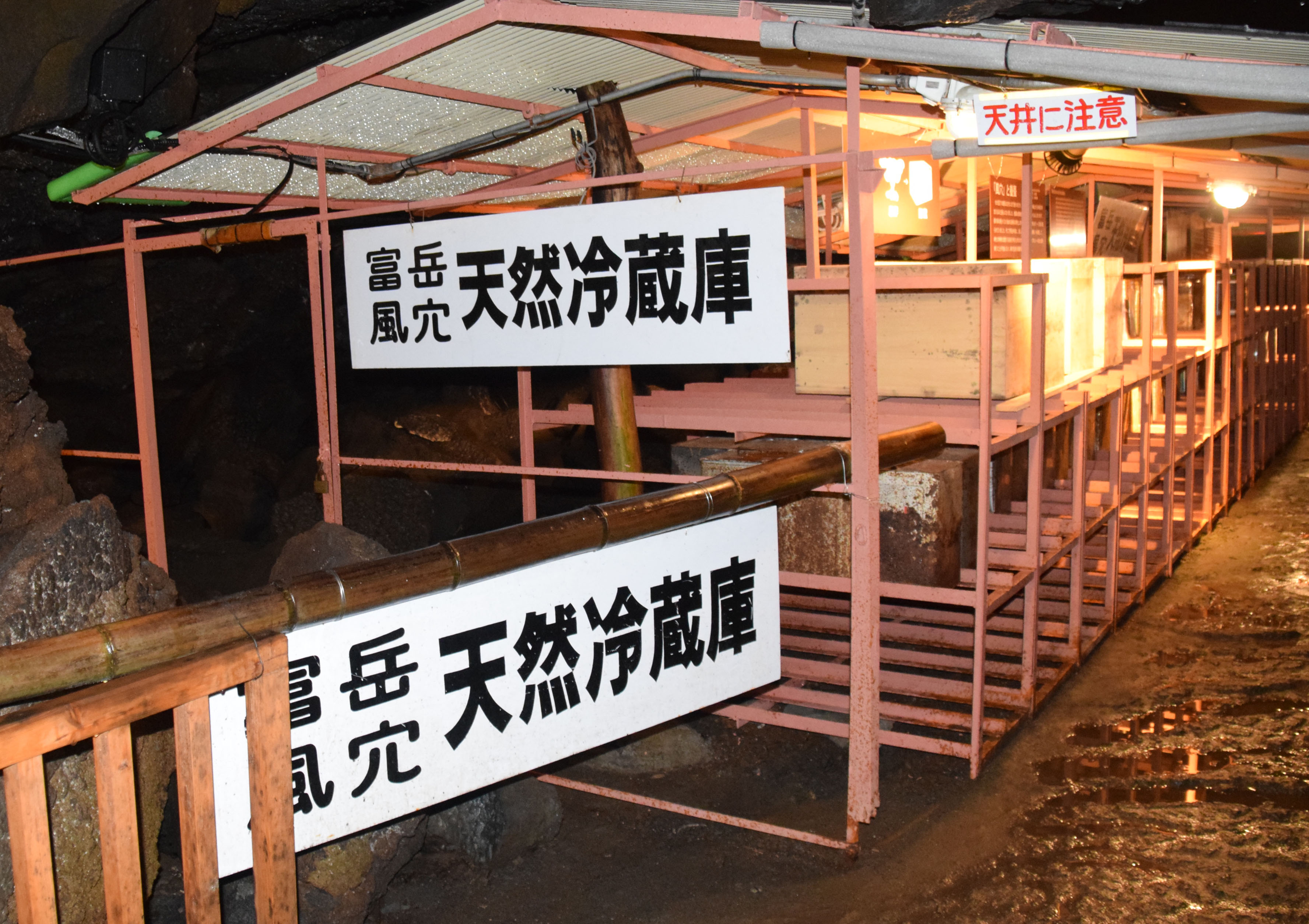
Natural refrigerator. (In olden days, eggs of silk worms were kept here.)
