= Kuroi Jukai =

Kuroi Jukai (黒い樹海) literally means "the black sea of trees," and may refer to:

- another name for Aokigahara, the forest around Mount Fuji in Japan, sometimes simply called "jukai" ("Sea of Trees")
- a 1960 novel by Seichō Matsumoto, Kuroi Jukai
- a noisegrind/powerviolence band from Edmonton
