= Narusawa Ice Cave =

Lava tube in Japan

Coordinates: 35°28′29″N 138°39′59″E

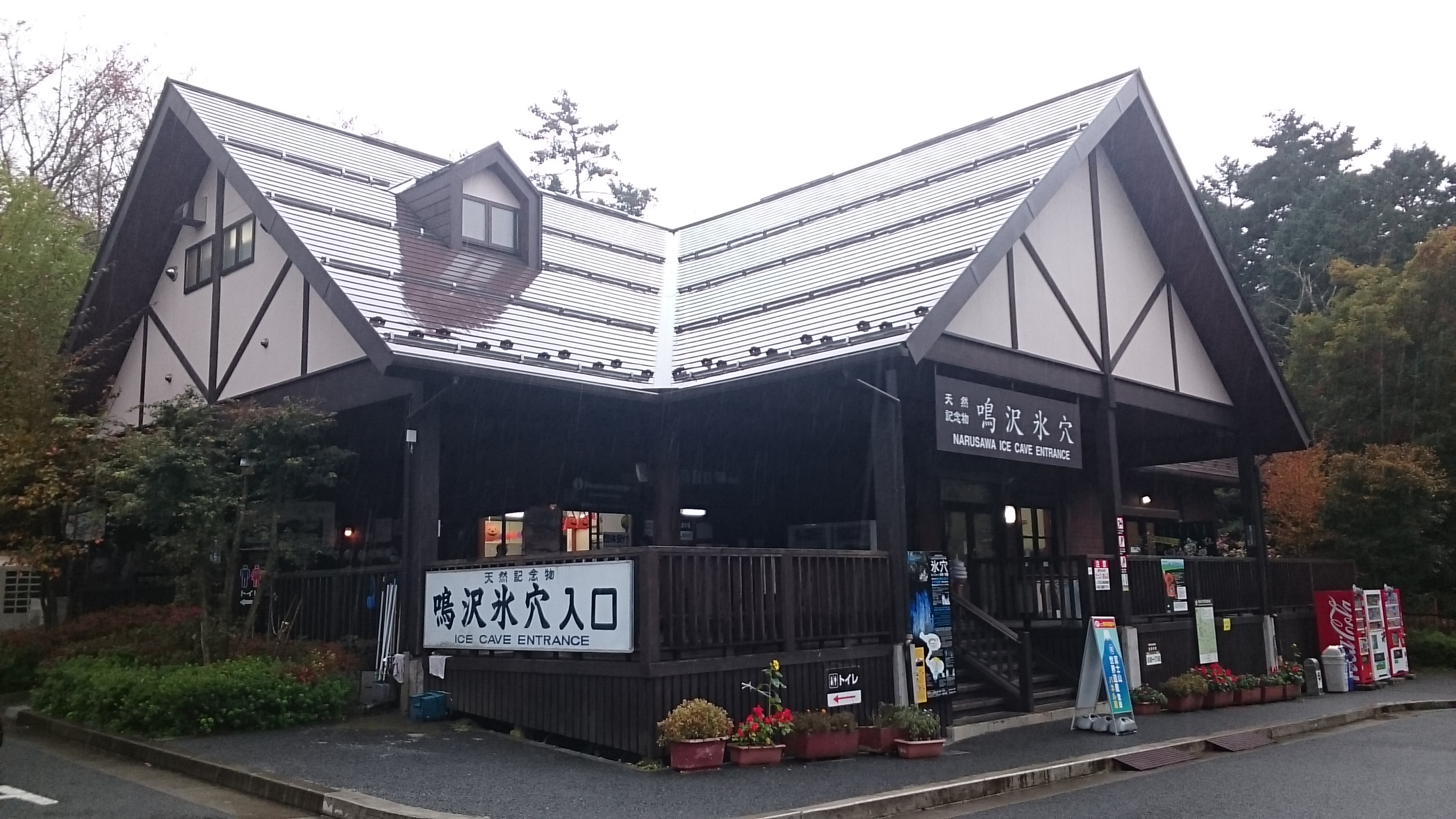
The Visitor Center of the Narusawa Ice Cave

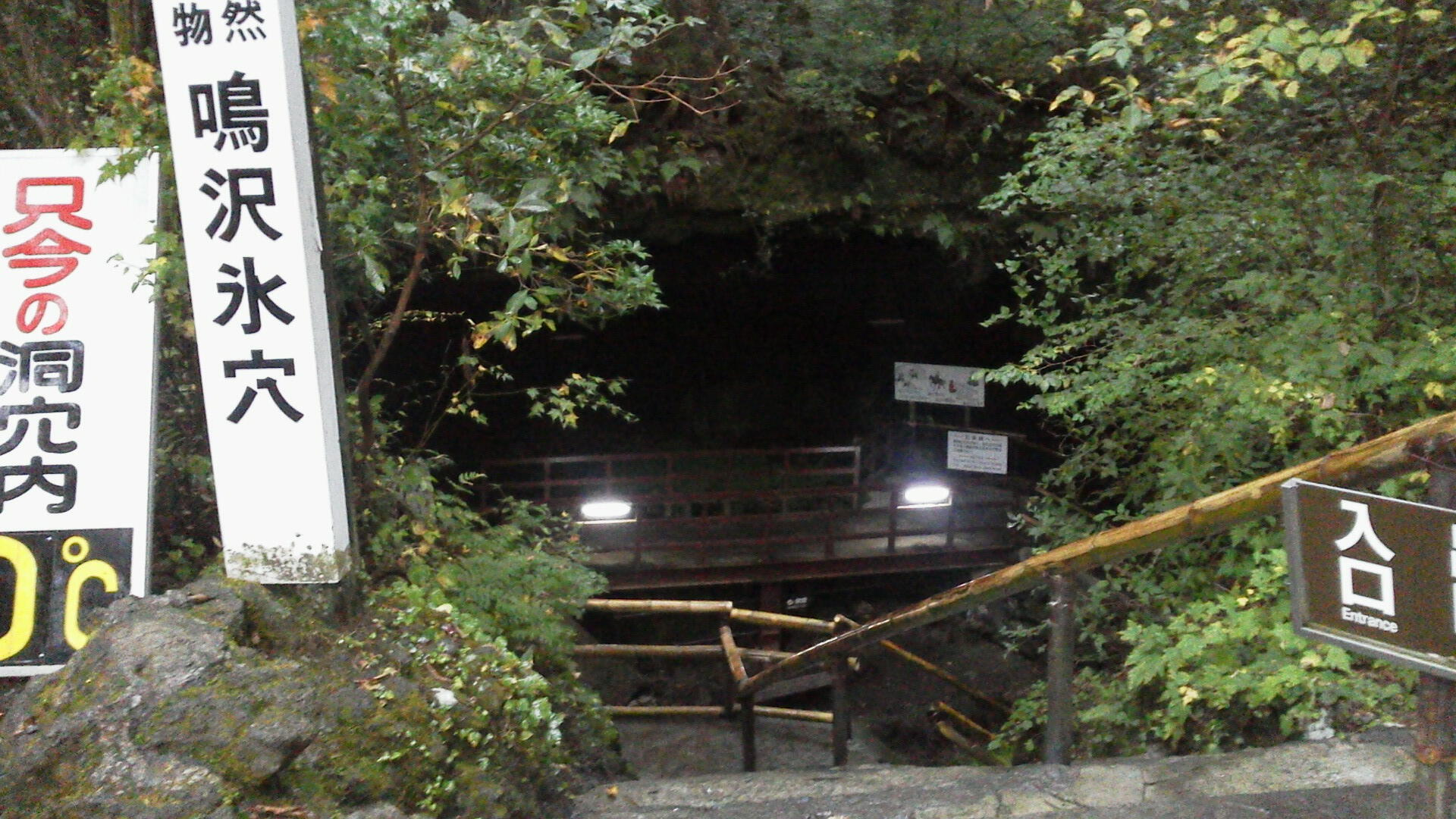
The entrance to the Narusawa Ice Cave

The Narusawa Ice Cave (Japanese: 鳴沢氷穴, Narusawa Hyōketsu) is a lava tube located in the Aokigahara forest, in the part that belongs to Narusawa Village, Yamanashi Prefecture, Japan. It is one of the three larger lava tubes at the northern foot of Mount Fuji, the other two caves being Fugaku Wind Cave and Lake Sai Bat Cave. All three were designated as Natural Monuments of Japan in 1929.

The Narusawa Ice Cave is 156 meters long measured along the visitor route with two lobes, with the width of 1.5 to 11 meters and the height of 1 to 3.6 meters. The average temperature inside the cave is about 3°C.

The cave was long used as a natural refrigerator. During the Edo period, ice cut in this cave was sent to the shōgun and his entourage in Edo. During the early 1900s, ice made here had been used in the refrigerator before the electric refrigerator arrived.

== Transportation ==
The Narusawa Cave is on Japan National Route 139; public bus transportation is available from Kawaguchiko Station of Fujikyūkō railway. By car, it takes about 30 minutes from Lake Kawaguchi exit of Chūō Expressway.

== See also ==
- Fugaku Wind Cave
- Lake Sai Bat Cave
