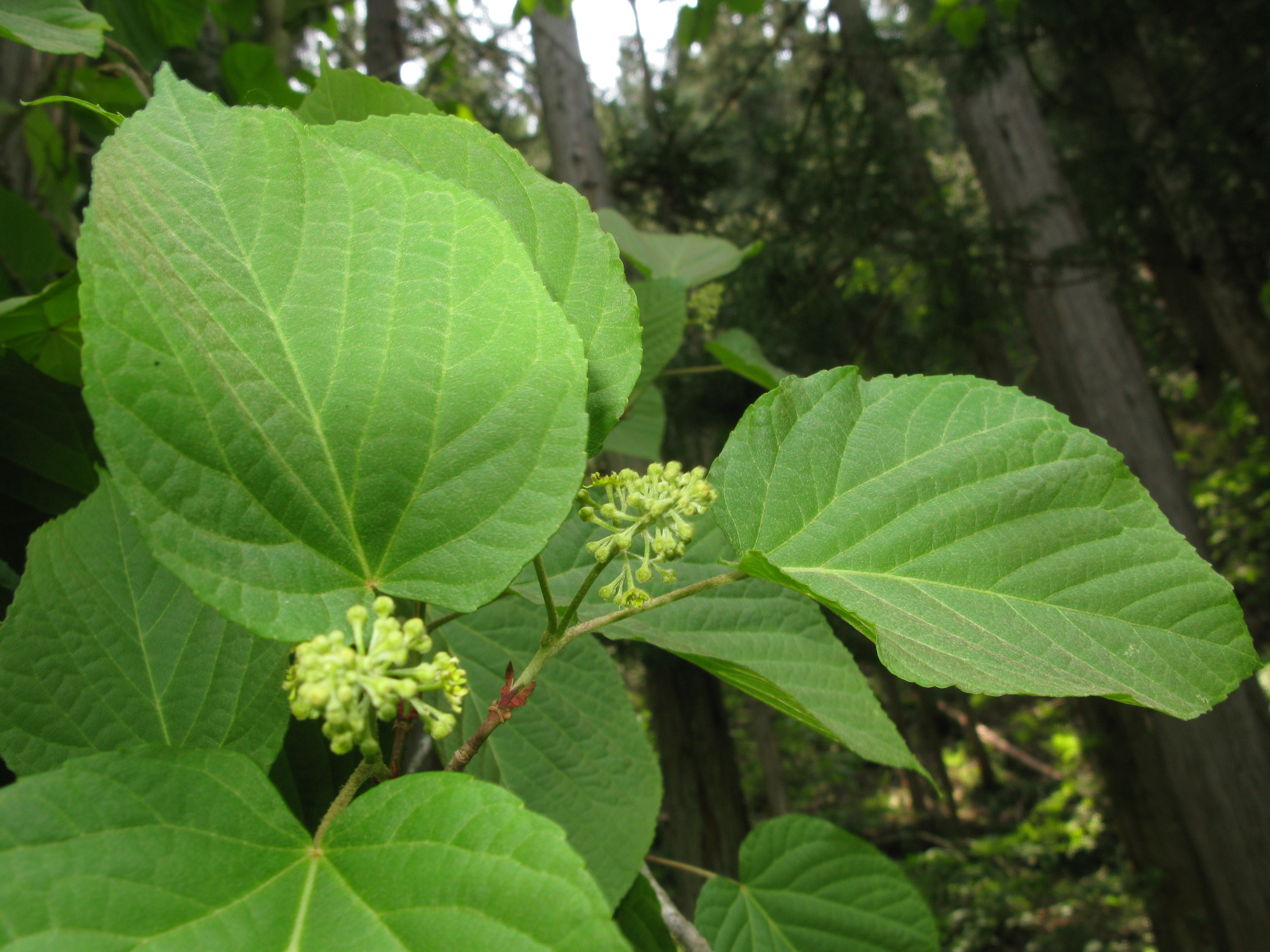

Conservation status
- Least Concern (IUCN 3.1)

Scientific classification
- Kingdom: Plantae
- Clade: Embryophytes
- Clade: Tracheophytes
- Clade: Spermatophytes
- Clade: Angiosperms
- Clade: Eudicots
- Clade: Rosids
- Order: Sapindales
- Family: Sapindaceae
- Genus: Acer
- Section: Acer sect. Parviflora
- Series: Acer ser. Distyla
- Species: A. distylum

Binomial name
- Acer distylum Siebold & Zucc.

= Acer distylum =

Species of flowering plant

Acer distylum, the lime-leaved maple or linden leaved maple, is a species of flowering plant in the family Sapindaceae, native to north Honshu Island of Japan. Its closest relative is Acer nipponicum, with which it is grouped in the Acer section Parviflora. The species is noted for its 10–15 cm (4–6 in) unlobed leaves, the like of which are not found in any other maple species. The bark is grayish, and has a pink cast in young specimens. Acer distylum was first described by Philipp Franz von Siebold and Joseph Gerhard Zuccarini in 1845, and later brought to Europe by Charles Maries in 1879.

== Distribution ==
Acer distylum is endemic to Japan, growing on fertile soils in the northern part of Honshu, but even there it is rather rare.

== Habitat and ecology ==
Acer distylum can be found mostly in woodland or garden canopy. Acer distylum is a treelike shrub to 10 m tall under favorable conditions, otherwise a much smaller shrub, with yellow-gray branches that are rather densely branched. Charles Maries introduced it in 1879 to Great Britain for Veitch Nursery, although Siebold and Zuccarini made the description in 1845. It is rather rare in Great Britain, but good specimens can be found in several gardens and collections.

== Morphology ==
Deciduous trees or large shrubs, small to medium height (5–10 m or 16–33 ft tall), yellow-gray branches that are rather densely branched. Leaves are undivided, deeply cordate, margins crenate, ovate, not lobed, 10–15 cm (3.9–5.9 in) long and 5–8 cm (2.0–3.1 in) wide, gray-green. Undersides pale green, shining and glabrous, pinkish gray when young. The fall color is yellow. Flowers are sepals hairy; discs lobed; stamens inserted between the lobes.

== Flowers and fruit ==
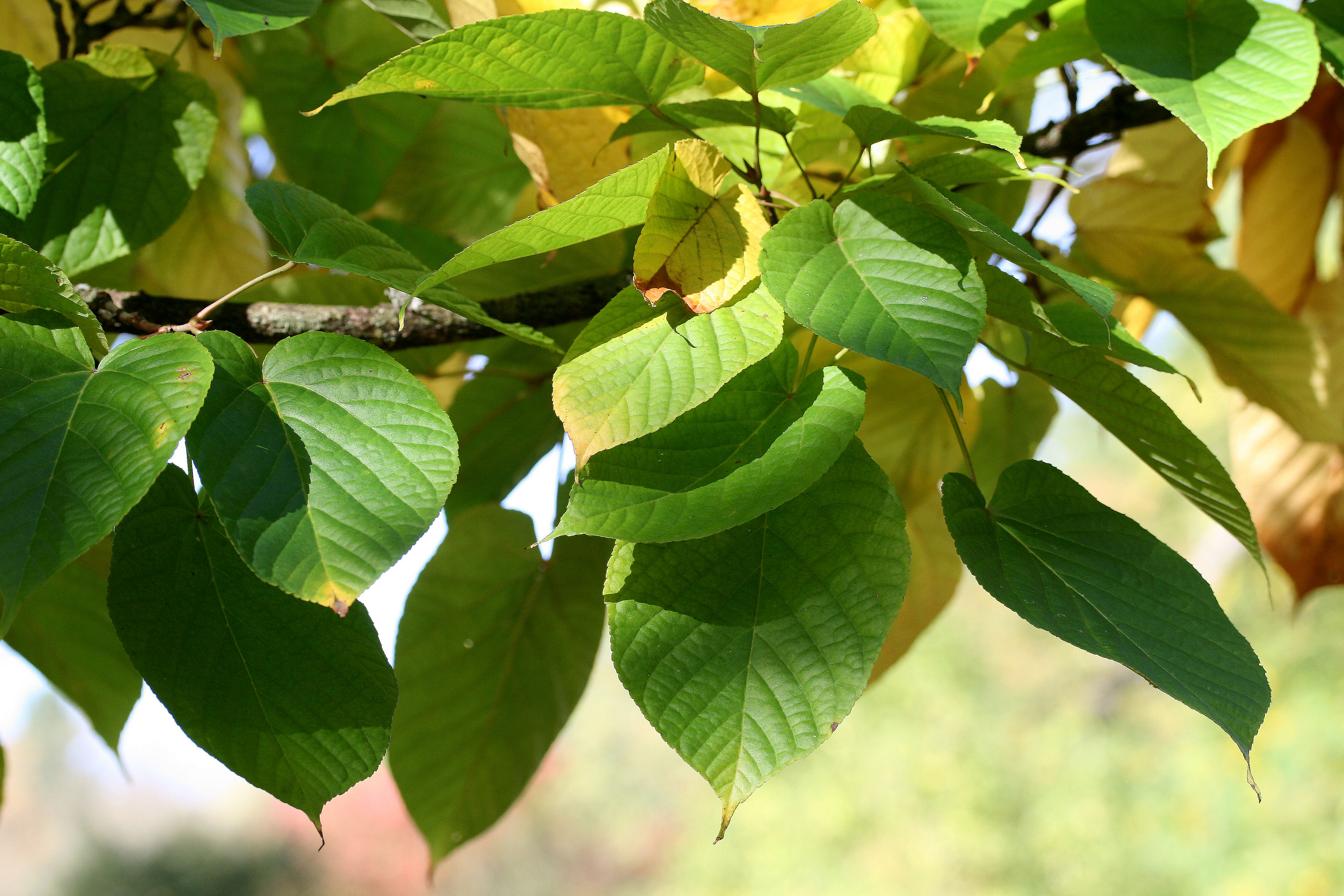
Acer distylum

Acer distylum has pale green inflorescences that are 7–10 cm (2.8–3.9 in) long, and flower in May to June, fruits 3–3.5 cm (1.2–1.4 in). The flowers are monoecious. The flowers' sepals are hairy, discs lobed, and stamens inserted between the lobes. Yellow on very erect spikes, small, nodding from the erect pedicels. Fruits are born on conspicuous erect racemes; nutlets with rounded wings about 3 cm long.
