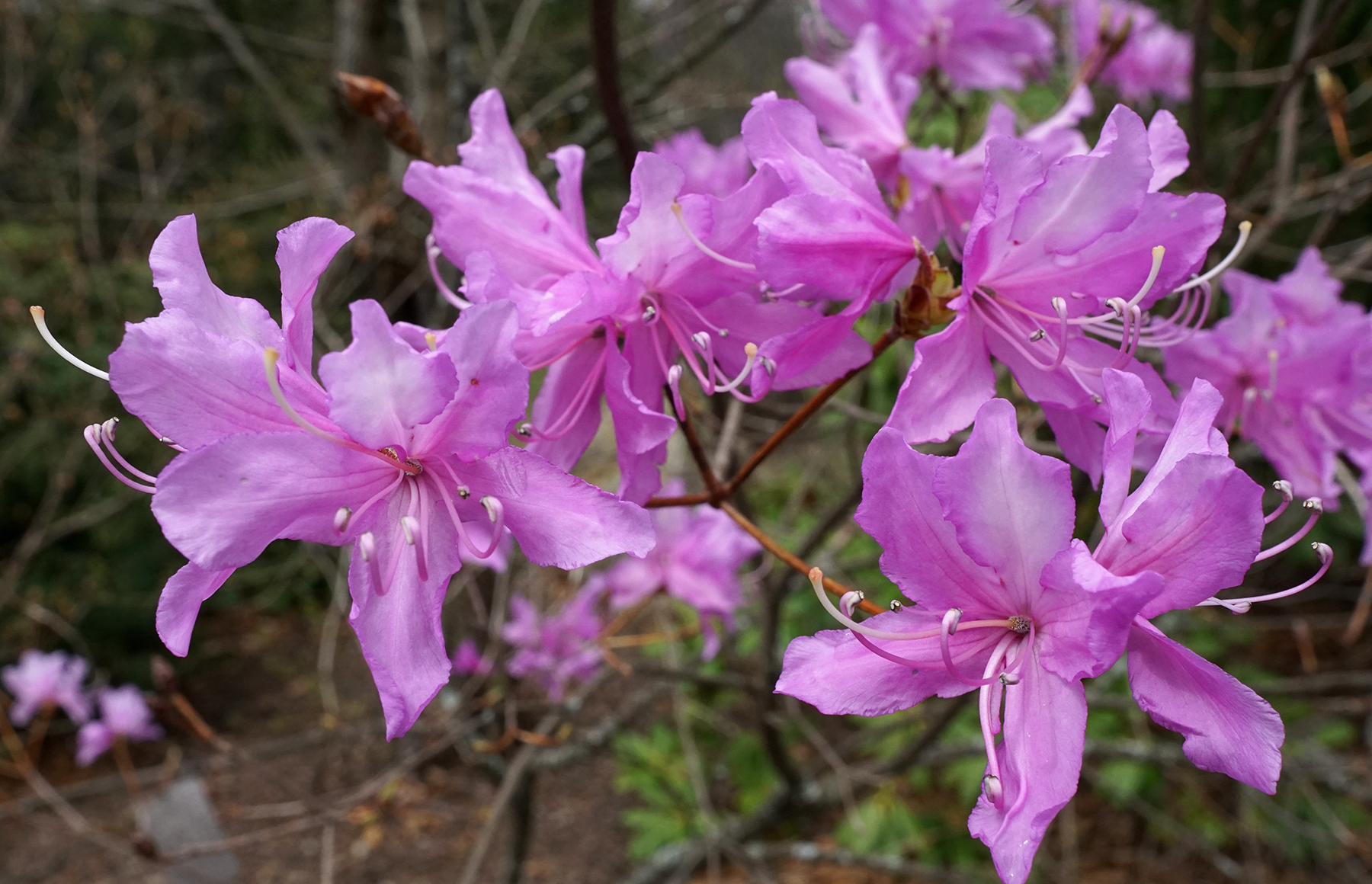

Conservation status
- Least Concern (IUCN 3.1)

Scientific classification
- Kingdom: Plantae
- Clade: Tracheophytes
- Clade: Angiosperms
- Clade: Eudicots
- Clade: Asterids
- Order: Ericales
- Family: Ericaceae
- Genus: Rhododendron
- Species: R. dilatatum

Binomial name
- Rhododendron dilatatum Miq., 1836

= Rhododendron dilatatum =

Species of flowering plant

Rhododendron dilatatum, the expanded azalea, is a species of flowering plant in the genus Rhododendron.

== Distribution ==
Rhododendron dilatatum is a shrub native to Japan and grows in temperate biomes.
