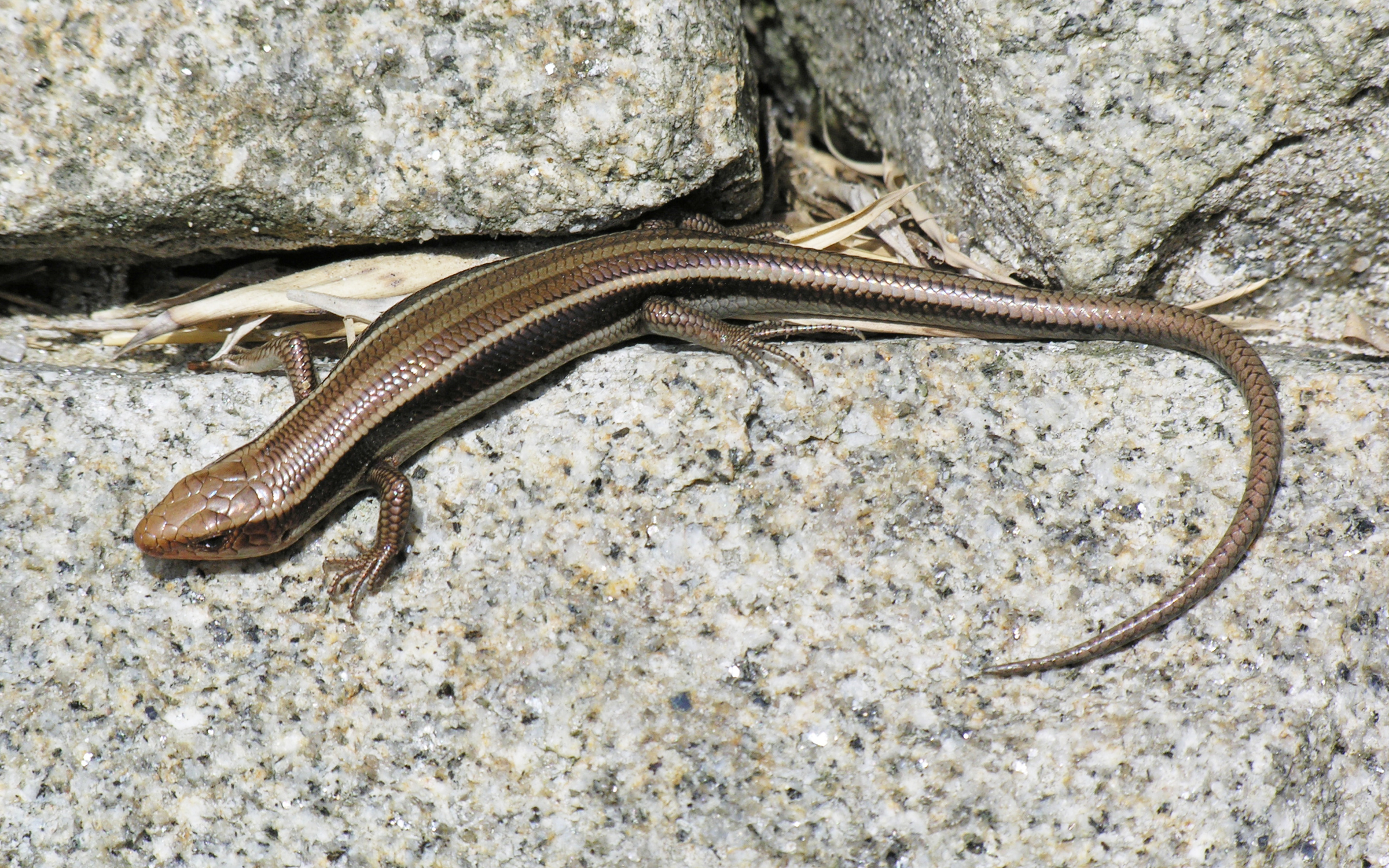
- Plestiodon japonicus (adult)

Conservation status
- Least Concern (IUCN 3.1)

Scientific classification
- Kingdom: Animalia
- Phylum: Chordata
- Class: Reptilia
- Order: Squamata
- Suborder: Scinciformata
- Infraorder: Scincomorpha
- Family: Scincidae
- Genus: Plestiodon
- Species: P. japonicus

Binomial name
- Plestiodon japonicus (Peters, 1864)

Synonyms
- Eumeces japonicus Goris & Maeda 2004

= Plestiodon japonicus =

Species of reptile

Plestiodon japonicus is a species of lizard which is endemic to Japan. The IUCN lists the species as least concern.

== Taxonomy ==
The species was first described in 1864 by the German naturalist Wilhelm Peters as Eumeces (Pleistodon) quinquelineatus var. Japonicus. It was placed into the genus Plestiodon in 2008. The genus Eumeces now contains African and Middle-Eastern skinks.

== Description ==
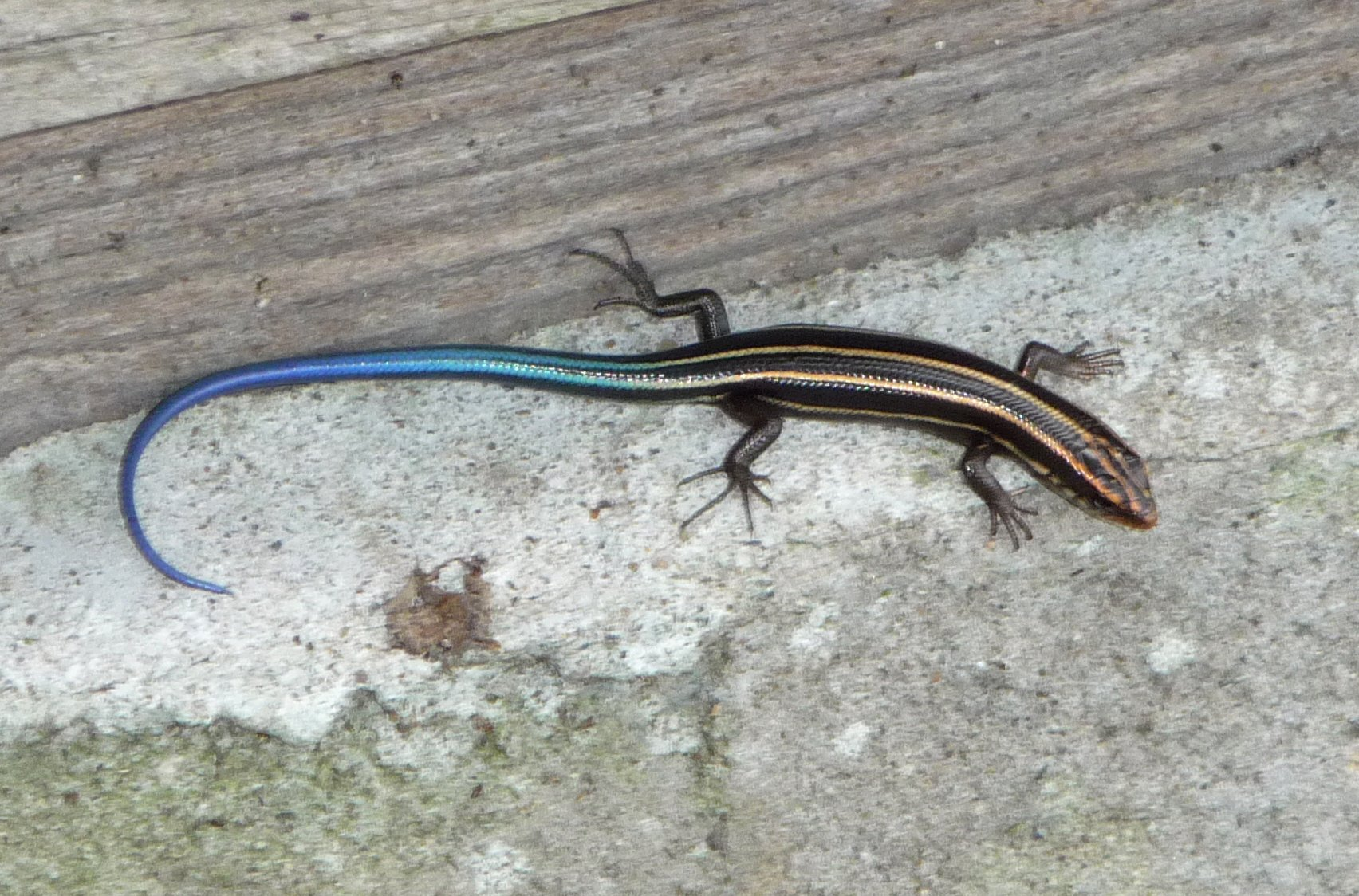
Plestiodon japonicus (juvenile)

A similar species is Plestiodon latiscutatus which is distributed o the Izu Peninsula and the Izu Islands.

Plestiodon japonicus has a total length of 15 to 24 cm with a snout-vent length of 6 to 9.6 cm. Juveniles have shiny blue tails and black bodies with five golden stripes. The adults are brown. While the females still retain stripes, they can disappear on the males. During the mating season the head of the males has a red color.

== Behavior ==
The mating season occurs from April to May. The females lay clutches of 6 to 15 eggs. They stay and care for them until they hatch.

== Geographic range ==
The species has the largest distribution of any skink species in Japan. It occurs in Western Honshu, Shikoku, Kyushu and surrounding islands.
