= Historic eruptions of Mount Fuji =

Volcanic history of Mount Fuji

Coordinates: 35°21′46.35″N 138°43′53.63″E

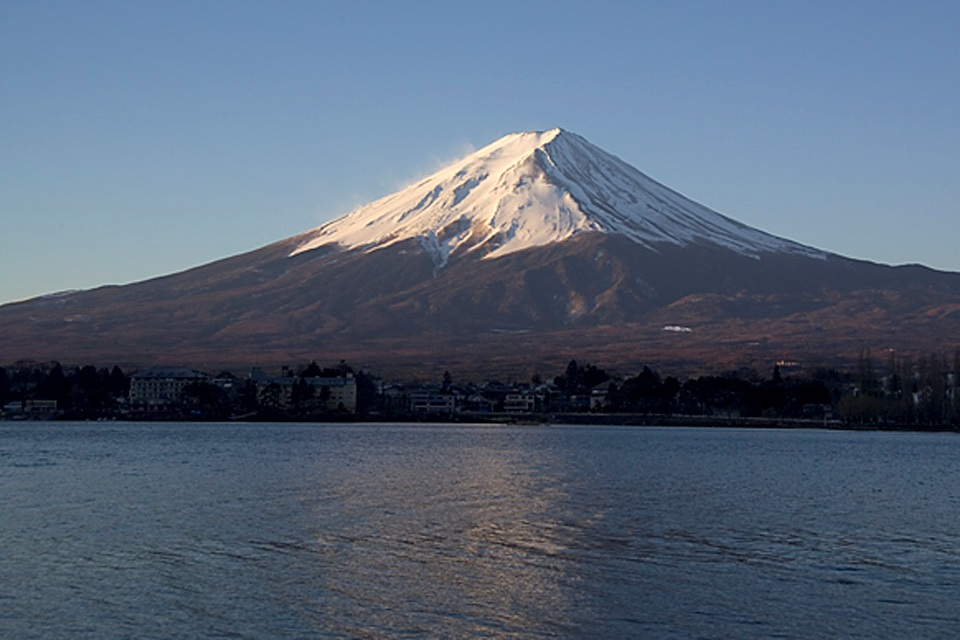
Mount Fuji

Mount Fuji is an active volcano which is the highest peak in Japan. The latest eruption of Mount Fuji was triggered by an earthquake in 1707. The mountain as it appears now is known to geologists as the New Fuji volcano, which began to erupt about 5,000 years ago. Under the New Fuji volcano lies the Old Fuji volcano, active between 100,000 and 9,000 years ago; and the Komitake volcano, active 700,000 to 200,000 years ago.

== Prehistory ==
=== Komitake and Old Fuji ===
There has been volcanic activity in the vicinity of Mount Fuji for several million years. The earliest geologically known volcano is Mount Komitake (小御岳火山, small mountain volcano) which became active 700,000 years ago. Mount Ashitaka (愛鷹山), another volcano south-east of Mount Fuji, was also highly active throughout this period. The peak of Komitake is about 2,300 meters (7,500 ft) above sea-level on the north face of Mount Fuji (at the fifth station).

Komitake entered another period of activity around 100,000 years ago. This created a new volcano known as Old Fuji (古富士, kofuji) which grew to a height of 3,000 meters (9,800 ft). Its many explosive eruptions spewed large amounts of scoria, volcanic ash and lava.

== New Fuji ==
Following the Old Fuji period, there were about 4,000 years of inactivity ending around 5,000 years ago, when Mount Fuji became active again; this is known as the New Fuji (新富士, shinfuji) period continuing to the present day. Eruptions of New Fuji exhibit most types of volcanic phenomena, including lava flows, magma, scoria, volcanic ash, collapses, and side eruptions, leading it to be called "a department store of eruptions." Ash from New Fuji is often black, and eruptions are new in terms of geological layers. Longterm data on the activity of Mount Fuji is recorded in Japanese historical documents from the 8th century onwards.

=== The Gotemba mud flow ===
About 2,300 years ago the east face of the volcano collapsed and lahars flowed down to the Gotemba area as far as the Ashigara plain in the east and the Suruga bay across Mishima city in the south. In this incident Gotemba mud flow (御殿場泥流, Gotemba deiryū), liquid mud covered an area as wide as the city of Mishima.

=== Jōgan eruption ===
In 864 (the 6th year of the Jōgan era) there was an eruption on the north-west side of Mount Fuji, which produced a great amount of lava.

- 864 (Jōgan 6, 5th month): Mount Fuji erupted for 10 days, and it ejected from its summit an immense quantity of cinders and ash. Lava, known as Aokigahara lava (青木ヶ原溶岩), flowed down its northwest bank, creating the plain that is now Aokigahara Forest and splitting lake Senoumi (せの海) into two lakes, Saiko (西湖) and Shōjiko (精進湖). Many people perished and many homes were destroyed. The volcanic eruption began on the side of Fuji-san closest to Mount Asama, throwing cinders and ash as far away as Kai Province.

=== Hōei eruption ===
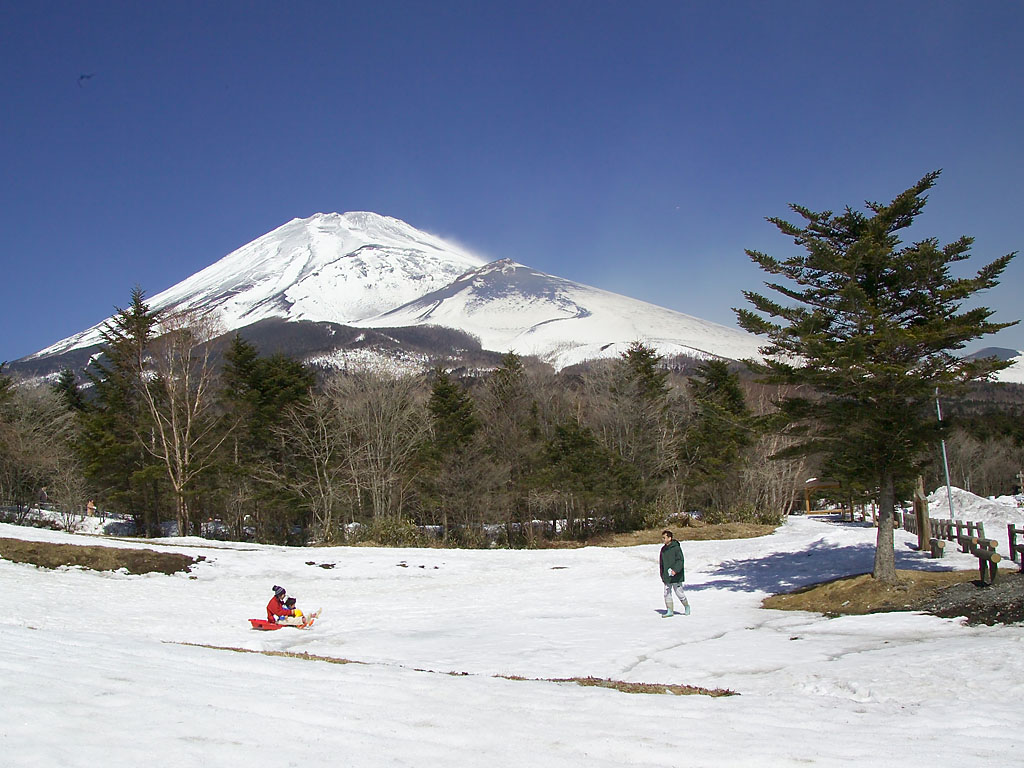
The Hoei Crater (on the peak's centre-right) was the location of the 1707 eruption.

The latest eruption, in 1707 (the 4th year of the Hōei era), was known as the Hōei eruption. It followed 49 days after the Hōei earthquake, 8.6 on the Richter scale. The earthquake severely damaged the city of Osaka, and also compressed the magma chamber 20 km under the inactive Mt. Fuji. Basaltic lava rose to the higher dacitic magma chamber at 8 km deep. The mixing of the two types of magma caused a Plinian eruption.

Four years earlier in 1703, another earthquake named Genroku had struck in Kanagawa and Shizuoka prefectures, measuring 8.2 on the Richter Scale. This had a similar but less severe effect on Mt. Fuji. It pressed the dike of the mountain at 8 km to the surface (where the dacitic magma resides), as well as the basaltic chamber at 20 km deep. Many articles found a correlation between the two earthquakes, arriving at the conclusion that both together caused the Hoei eruption.

- November 11, 1707 (Hōei 4, 14th day of the 10th month): The city of Osaka suffers tremendously from a very violent earthquake.
- December 16, 1707 (Hōei 4, 23rd day of the 11th month): An eruption of Mount Fuji; the cinders and ash fell in Izu, Kai, Sagami, and Musashi. This eruption was remarkable, as it spread a vast amount of volcanic ash and scoria reaching as far as Edo (now Tokyo) almost 100 km (62.137 miles) away.

=== Records of eruption ===
Seventeen eruptions of New Fuji have been recorded since 781. Many occurred in the Heian era, with twelve eruptions between 800 and 1083. Sometimes inactive periods lasted for hundreds of years: between 1083 and 1511, no eruptions were recorded for over 400 years. At present, there have been no eruptions since the Hoei eruption in 1707, over 300 years ago.

== Current eruptive danger ==
Scientists study the activity of the magma rising by measuring CO_{2} emissions in the deeper parts of the volcano. Studies from before 2011 show CO_{2} emissions below the detection limit of 5 gCO_{2}/m^{3}/day. Emissions above 5 gCO_{2}/m^{3}/day indicate seismic activity which might lead to an eruption. According to a five-stage evolutionary model for the release of volcanic gas, Mt. Fuji is currently at stage I: magma is at a considerable 10 km (6.2 mi) depth, with no regular emissions.

The 2011 Tōhoku earthquake and tsunami drew much attention to the volcanic reaction of Mount Fuji. Experts have found that the internal pressure of the magma chamber has increased to an estimated 1.6 megapascals, raising speculations of an eruption. The financial damage to Japan from a Fuji eruption is estimated at ¥2.5 trillion (about $25 billion).

== See also ==
- Hōei eruption
- List of volcanoes in Japan
