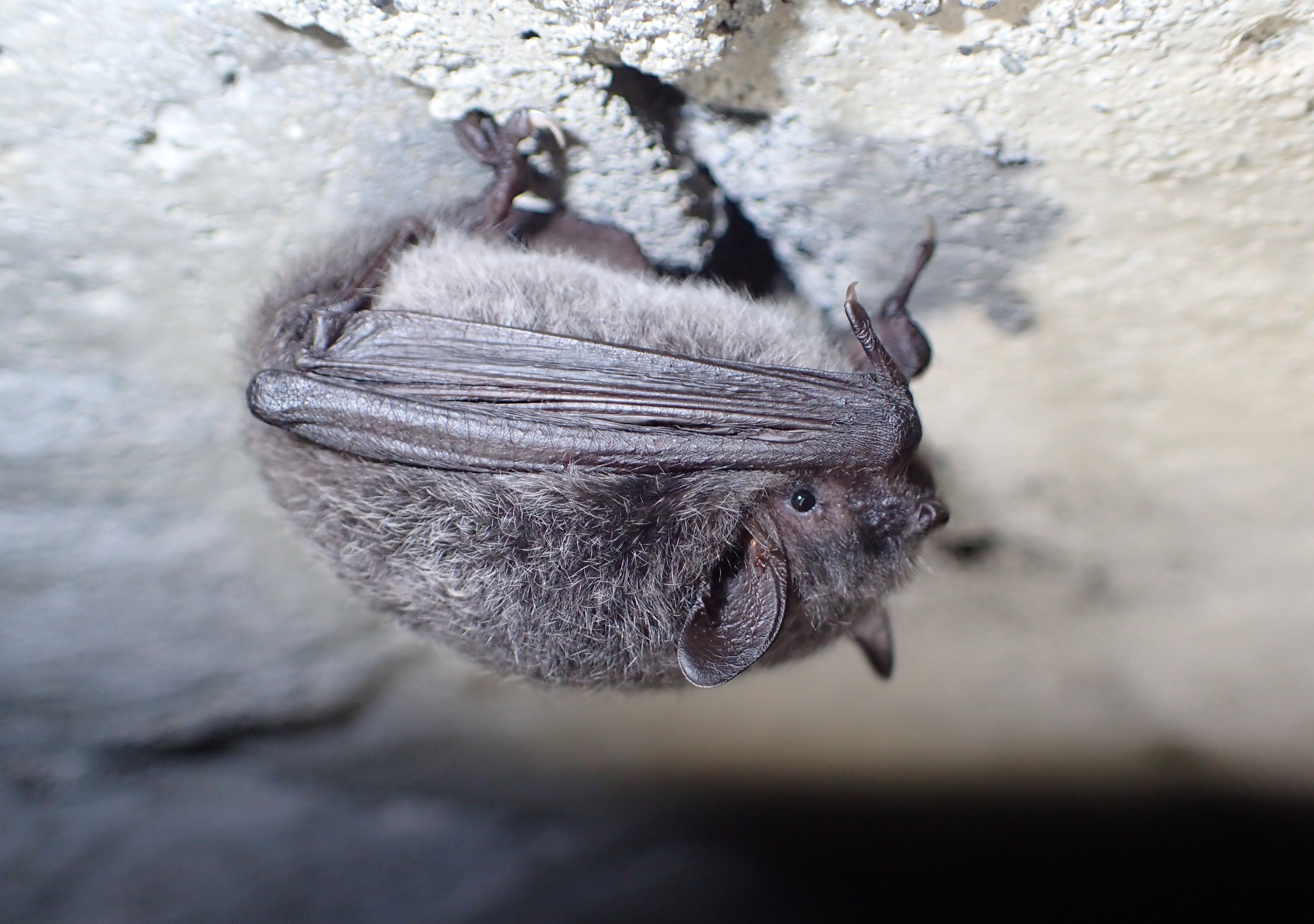

Conservation status
- Least Concern (IUCN 3.1)

Scientific classification
- Kingdom: Animalia
- Phylum: Chordata
- Class: Mammalia
- Order: Chiroptera
- Family: Vespertilionidae
- Genus: Myotis
- Species: M. macrodactylus

Binomial name
- Myotis macrodactylus (Temminck, 1840)
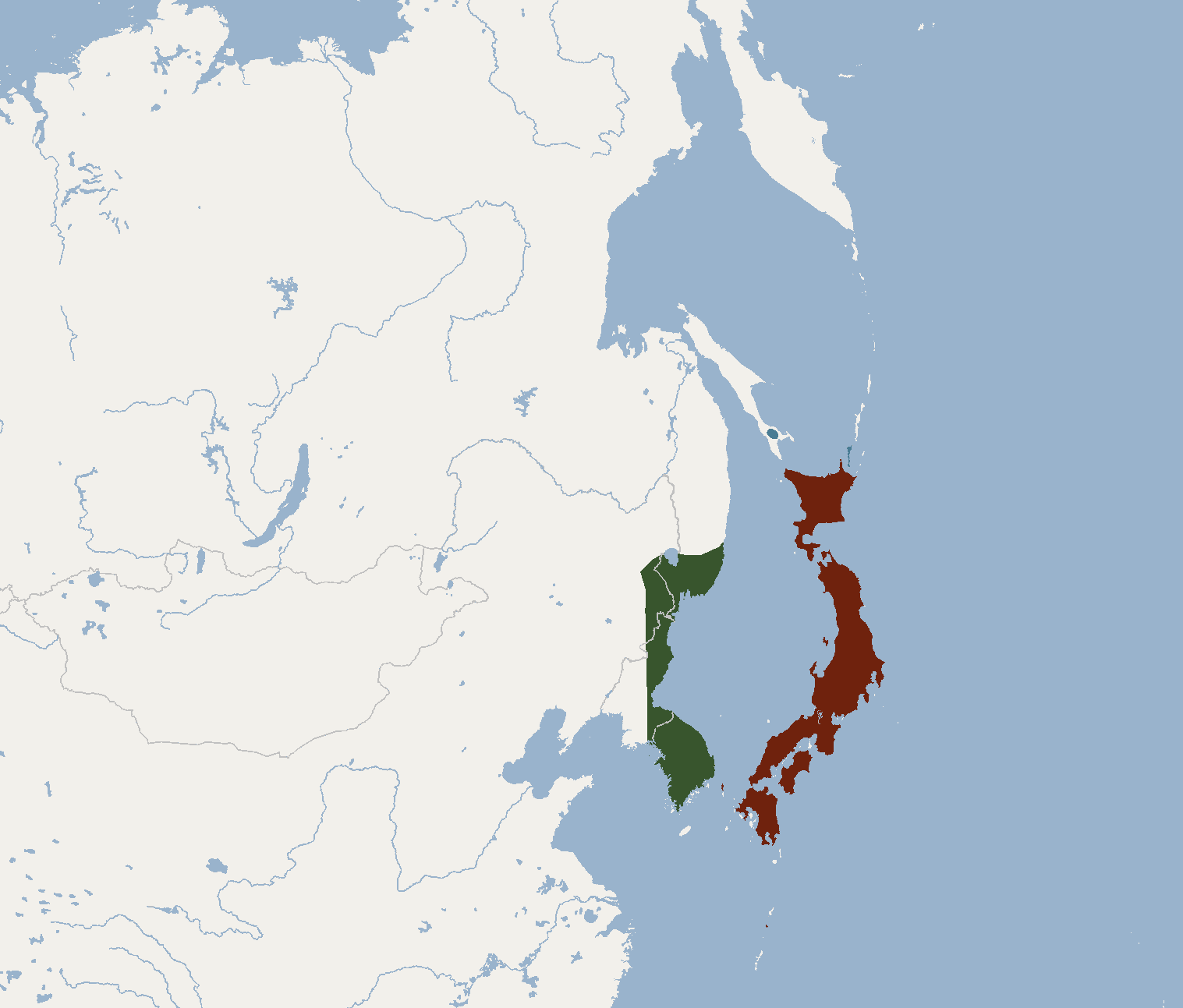

= Eastern long-fingered bat =

Species of bat

The eastern long-fingered bat, or big-footed myotis (Myotis macrodactylus) is a species of vesper bat found in China, Japan, North Korea, South Korea, and Russia. Roosting in caves and rock crevices during the day, it forages at night for insects near rivers and streams.

== Taxonomy ==
The eastern long-fingered bat was described as a new species in 1840 by Dutch zoologist Coenraad Jacob Temminck. Temminck placed it in the genus Vespertilio, with a scientific name of Vespertilio macrodactylus. The holotype had been collected in Japan.

Some authors previously considered it a subspecies of the long-fingered bat (Myotis capaccinii), though it is now widely recognized as a full species. It has three subspecies:

- M. m. continentalis Tiunov, 1997
- M. m. insularis Tiunov, 1997
- M. m. macrodactylus (Temminck, 1840)

== Biology and ecology ==
The eastern long-fingered bat is a social species, with males and females roosting together in colonies that can number several hundred individuals. Colonies can also include other bat species. They are seasonal breeders, with the breeding season in the fall. Due to delayed fertilization, pregnancy does not begin until the spring. Females give birth to a single young during June or July. Females become sexually mature shortly before age two, remaining fertile through age fifteen.

It is insectivorous, catching its prey in flight (hawking) or plucking insects from the surface of bodies of water (gleaning).

== Range and habitat ==
The eastern long-fingered bat is found in Russian Far East and East Asia, including China, Japan, North Korea, South Korea, and Russia. Within its range, the eastern long-fingered bat is strongly associated with riparian habitat, as it forages for food over rivers. During the day it roosts in rock crevices, human structures, and caves.
