= Narusawa, Yamanashi =

Narusawa 鳴沢村
- Village
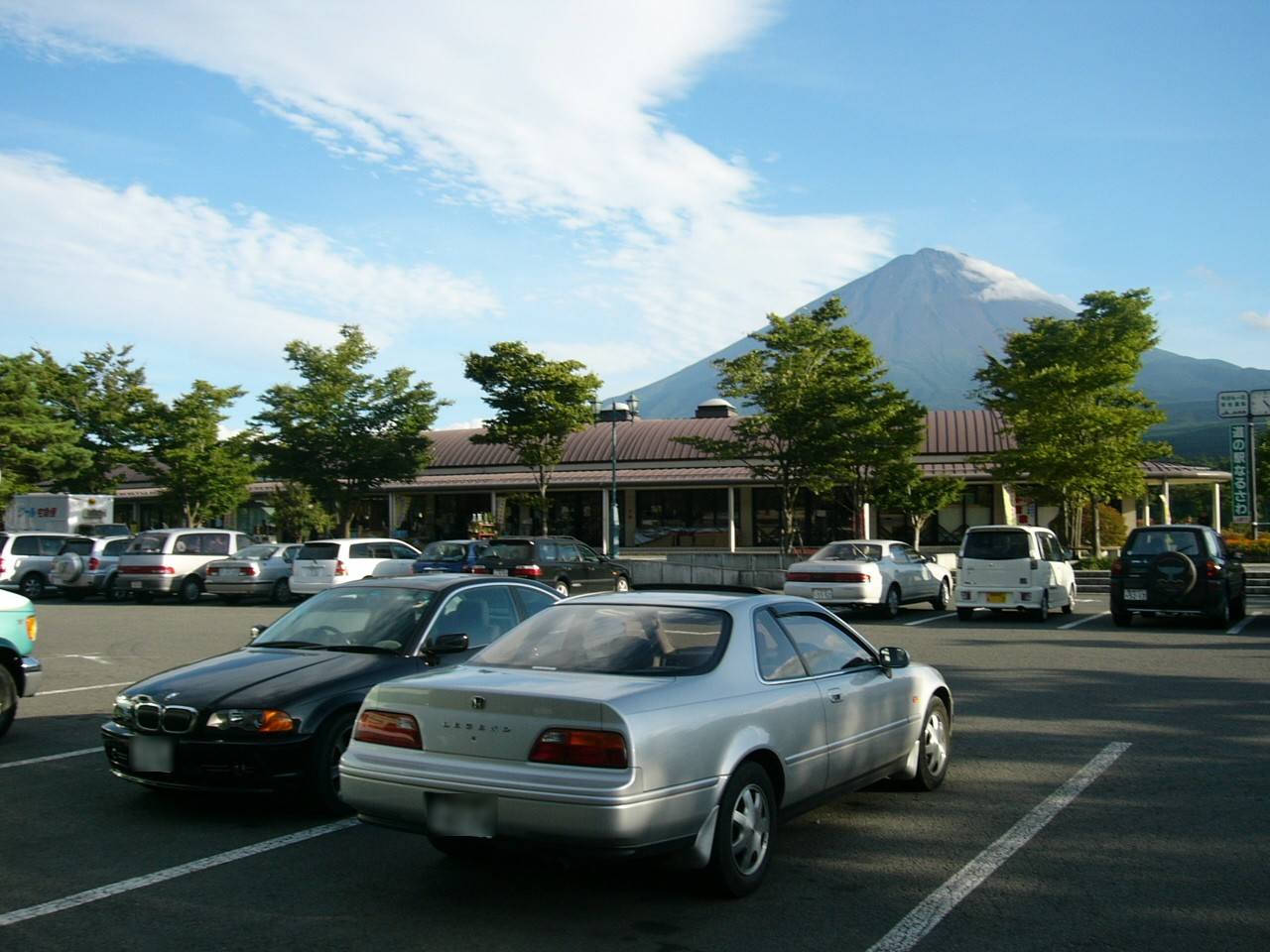
- Mt Fuji from Narusawa michi-no-eki

- Flag Seal

- Location of Narusawa in Yamanashi Prefecture

- Coordinates: 35°28′52.9″N 138°42′23.2″E
- Country: Japan
- Region: Chūbu; Tōkai
- Prefecture: Yamanashi Prefecture
- District: Minamitsuru

Area
  - Total: 89.58 km^{2} (34.59 sq mi)

Population (June 1, 2019)
  - Total: 3,152
  - Density: 35.19/km^{2} (91.13/sq mi)
- Time zone: UTC+9 (Japan Standard Time)
- Phone number: 0555-85-2311
- Address: 1575 Narusawa-mura Minimitsuru-gun, Yamanashi-ken 401-0398
- Website: Official website

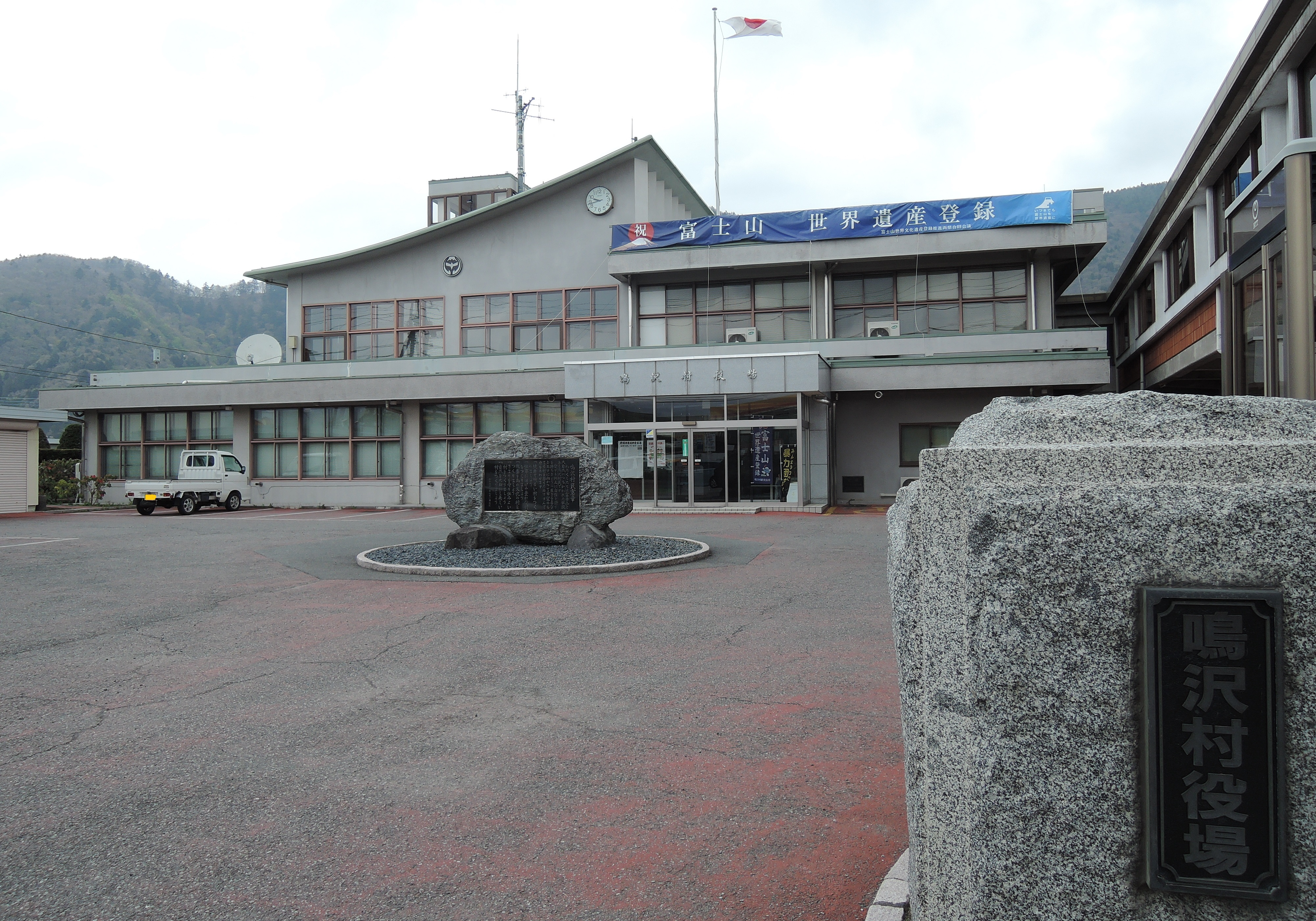
Narusawa Village Hall

Narusawa (鳴沢村, Narusawa-mura) is a village located in Yamanashi Prefecture, Japan. As of 1 June 2019, the village had an estimated population of 3,152 in 1257 households, and a population density of 32.6 persons per km^{2}. The total area of the village is 89.58 square kilometres (34.59 sq mi).

== Geography ==
Narusawa is located in southern Yamanashi Prefecture, in the foothills of Mount Fuji. The entire village is located within the borders of the Fuji-Hakone-Izu National Park.

=== Neighboring municipalities ===
Shizuoka Prefecture

- Oyama

Yamanashi Prefecture

- Fujikawaguchiko
- Fujiyoshida

=== Climate ===
The city has a climate characterized by characterized by hot and humid summers, and relatively mild winters (Köppen climate classification Cfb). The average annual temperature in Kōshū is 9.6 °C. (Note that the preceding climate information is for a distant location in the same prefecture as Narusawa village that has a very different climate and elevation from Narusawa.) The average annual rainfall is 1751 mm with September as the wettest month.

== History ==
The place name "Narusawa" is mentioned in the Kamakura period chronicle Azuma Kagami as a hamlet on the road connecting Kai Province with Suruga Province. During the Edo period, all of Kai Province was tenryō territory under direct control of the Tokugawa shogunate. With the establishment of the modern municipalities system in the early Meiji period on July 1, 1889, the village of Narusawa was created within Minamitsuru District, Yamanashi Prefecture.

== Demographics ==
Per Japanese census data, the population of Narusawa has remained relatively steady over the past several decades.

Historical population
Year	Pop.	±%
1940	2,096	—
1950	2,316	+10.5%
1960	2,316	+0.0%
1970	2,097	−9.5%
1980	2,249	+7.2%
1990	2,650	+17.8%
2000	2,864	+8.1%
2010	2,964	+3.5%
2020	2,824	−4.7%

== Education ==
Narusawa has one public elementary school operated by the village government. The village does not have a junior high school or a high school.

== Transportation ==
=== Railway ===
- Narusawa does not have any railway services

=== Highway ===
- National Route 139

== Local attractions ==
The Kawaguchiko Motor Museum is located in Narusawa.

== Sister cities ==
- Sellières, Jura, Franche-Comté, France
