= Itchiku Kubota =

Japanese textile artist famed for re-inventing lost dyeing technique

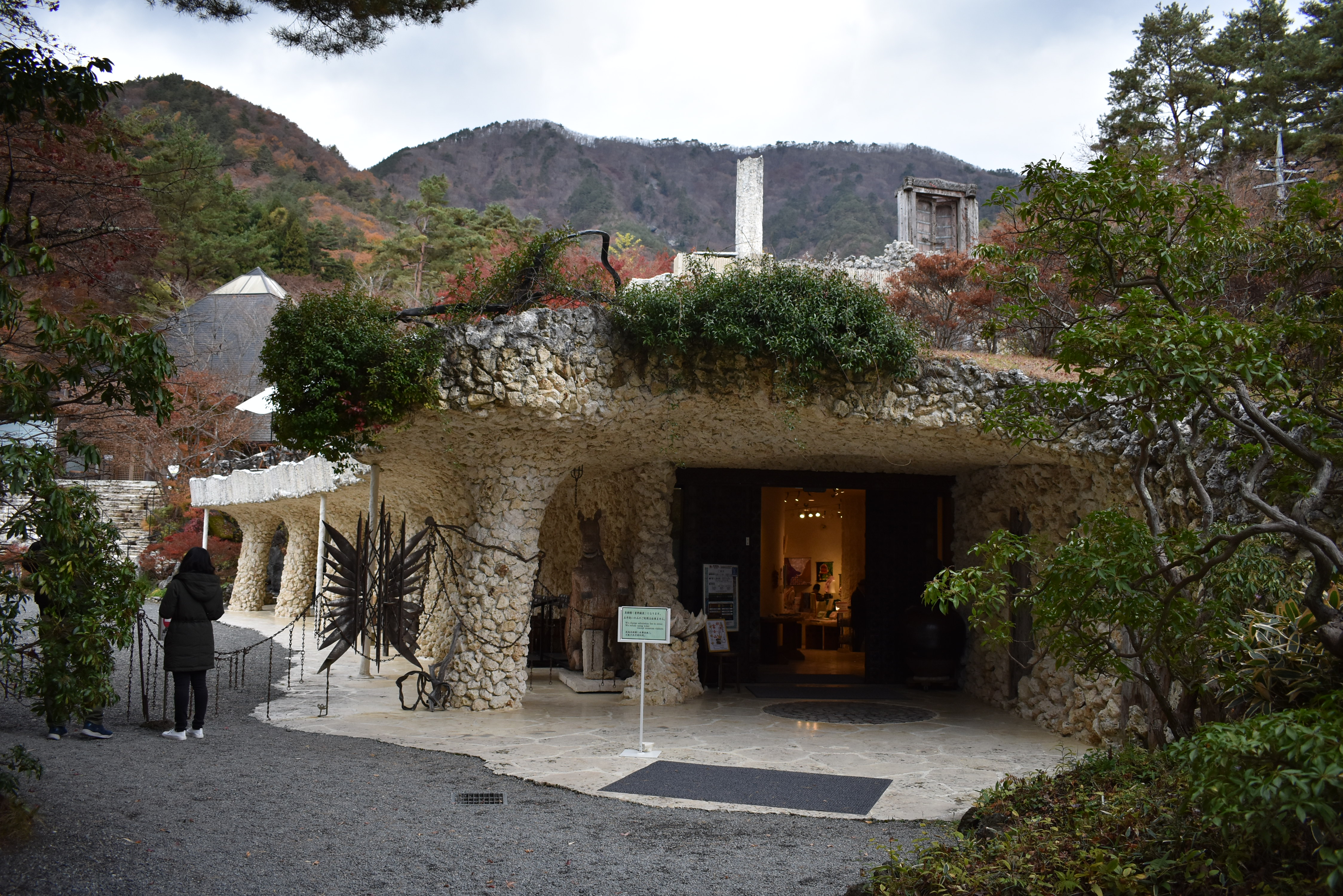
Itchiku Kubota Art Museum, Fujikawaguchiko, Yamanashi

Itchiku Kubota (久保田 一竹, Kubota Itchiku) (1917–2003) was a Japanese textile artist. He was most famous for reviving and in part reinventing an otherwise lost late 15th- to early 16th-century textile dye technique known as tsujigahana (lit. "flowers at the crossroads"), which became the main focus for much of his life's work. As homage to the original tsujigahana technique and its legacy, he named the technique 'itchiku tsujigahana'.

Kubota devised a new method of dyeing that produce unique richly coloured products, and he experimented with modern fabrics that would take well to the dyes and stitch-resist work.

== Biography ==
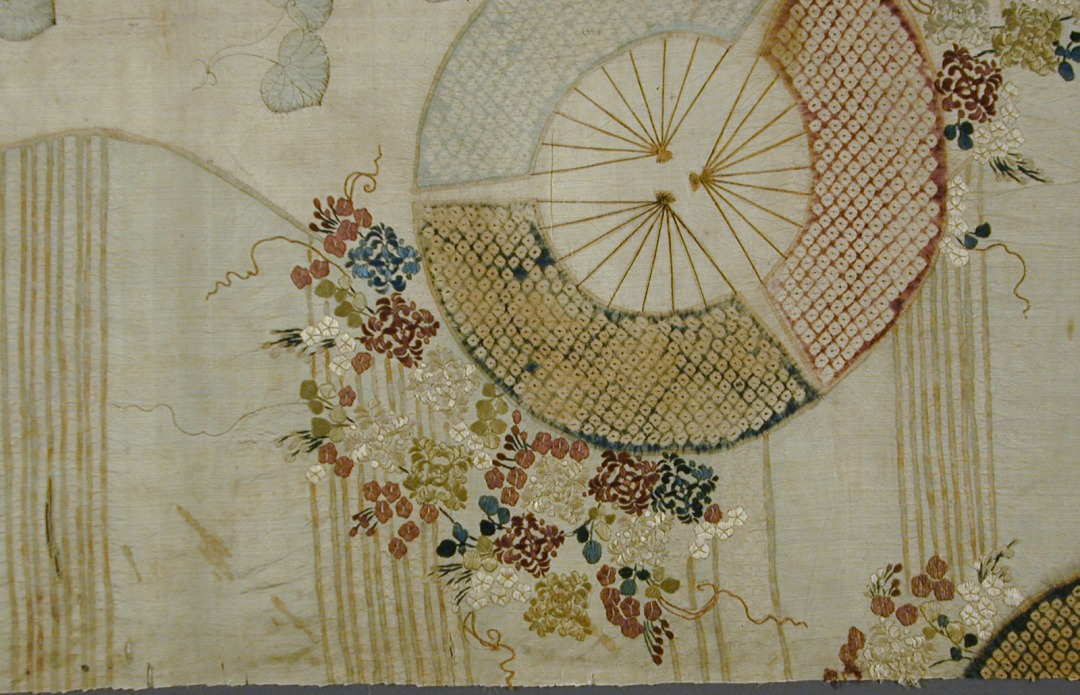
Textile fragment of the Momoyama period (1568-1615), dyed in the tsujigahana style; small tie-dyed dots (kanoko shibori), silk thread embroidery, ink painting (kaki-e), and gold leaf (surihaku) on white plain-weave silk (nerinuki)

Itchiku Kubota was born in Kanda, Tokyo, in 1917, the son of an antique dealer. Kubota grew up in an environment rich with opportunities to view traditional Japanese art: the neighbourhood in which he lived was filled with dye workshops.

In 1931, at the age of 14, Kubota left school to become the apprentice of Kobayashi Kiyoshi, a Tokyo-based kimono artist who specialized in hand-painted yūzen dyework (a paste resist-dyeing technique). Kubota also studied other techniques for decorating fabrics, as well as Japanese-style landscape painting and portraiture. By the age of 19, he had established a dye studio of his own.

Kubota first saw a fragment of fabric dyed in the tsujigahana style at the age of 20 in the Tokyo National Museum. The tsujigahana technique would go on to become the main focus of much of his life's work:

Restraining the pounding of my heart, I gazed intently at that small piece of fabric exuding a subtle and profound atmosphere (…). It carried a quality that was almost plaintive and mysterious. In the hall which was practically devoid of visitors, I continued to look at that small piece of fabric, as if placed under a spell, for over three hours.

Tsujigahana (lit. "flowers at the crossroads") was a popular dyeing method in the Muromachi (1336-1573) to early Edo period (1603-1867), before it fell out of fashion and its method of production was lost. The technique utilised stitched resist dyeing (nuishime shibori), which was then elaborated upon with hand-painted dyework, typically in floral motifs. Gold and silver leaf and embroidery were also used to embellish the designs. However, little is known about the original meaning of the word 'tsujigahana', or the technique's original method of production, despite the knowledge of its combined techniques. By the beginning of the 17th century, other styles of dyeing and surface design (such as yūzen) had become increasingly fashionable and tsujigahana vanished, leaving little trace of how the designs were created.

Kubota became fascinated by the technique and its unknown method of creation, as no other techniques in living memory used a combination of tie-dyeing and hand-painted dyework, making it very unusual for use on modern kimono. Because no instructions survived explaining the reproduction of the technique, and because the silk fabric necessary for its successful production (known as nerinuki) was no longer woven, Kubota was forced to experiment by himself for decades and devoted himself to reviving tsujigahana dyeing.

=== Post-war ===
In the following years, Kubota experienced a number of hardships; he had been drafted to the frontlines during the World War II, and spent three years in a prisoner-of-war camp until his demobilization at the age of 31. On his return to Japan, he set up a workshop in Tokyo and went back to yūzen dyeing. Seven years later, he finally decided to devote himself to the creation of his own tsujigahana technique; Kubota had found recreation of the exact technique formerly used impossible, as the fabric originally used for the technique was no longer produced. Kubota also felt that it was meaningless to cling to the past and ignore the highest-quality contemporary silk textiles and synthetic dyes that were products of the modern world. Rather than simply replicate the technique, he decided to create it in modern form, by combining his yūzen dyeing skills, modern textiles and modern dyes with the complex resist-dyeing, delicate ink painting. In recreating the technique, Kubota used chirimen (silk crepe) in place of nerinuki. The panels of fabric were stitched and dyed independently, before being joined together and assembled to form the kimono.

Kubota devised a new method of dyeing that produce unique richly coloured products, and he experimented with modern fabrics that would take well to the dyes and stitch-resist work. As homage to the original tsujigahana and its legacy, he named the technique 'itchiku tsujigahana'. In 1977, when Kubota was 60 years old, he displayed his itchiku tsujigahana kimono for the first time in an exhibition in Tokyo. Although some traditionalists criticized Kubota for attaching the term 'tsujigahana' to his work, he had a strong advocate in Tomoyuki Yamanobe, one of the most respected textile scholars of the time.

Working without a preparatory draft, Kubota considered each piece as a work that revealed itself during the fabrication process. The oversized format he used for some of his creations, such as the Mount Fuji series, are similar to a canvas, with the kimono then becoming a work of art.

By 1978, Kubota began to look beyond individual kimono and, instead, began to view kimono as a continuous canvas on which he could create panoramic visions permeated with light and colour. In 1979, he started working on his greatest creation, a series of 80 continuous kimono that would depict, as he put it, the "grandeur of the universe". These artworks would ultimately develop into 'The Symphony of Light' collection. Kubota would ultimately pass away in 2003 before the completion of the series.

== Tsujigahana technique ==
Itchiku tsujigahana is a complex process comprising several steps: first comes the preliminary drawing where the pattern will be stitched on the white fabric; then comes the tying; and thirdly, the dyeing of the fabric. The dyeing step has to be perfectly mastered to achieve the desired result – the dye will react differently according to the fabric and the colours used. To get a multi-coloured fabric, each tone will have to be applied separately from the others. The result will be a superimposition of one-colour layers with, or without overlap.

The next steps, unthreading (revealing the design), steaming and fixing the colours and textile are followed by the ultimate one, when the designer draws patterns on the white-out areas of the fabric in ink.

== Works ==
Kubota's creations are collectively known as The Kubota Collection. The Collection consists of 104 kimono dyed using the itchiku tsujigahana technique.

Throughout his life, Kubota was strongly motivated by his long-standing admiration and love for nature, with the subject matter of his kimono exploring and depicting themes of nature, the cosmos, and the seasons.

The Collection includes the works from the 'Mount Fuji', 'Oceans', 'Universe' series, some individual pieces, and Kubota's unfinished lifetime project, 'The Symphony of Light'.

Some of the kimono were featured in Noh and kabuki theatrical productions, in fashion shows, music concerts and exhibitions around the world.

Due to their fragility and importance for Japan's cultural history, and in accordance with Kubota's wishes, parts of his creations are displayed all year-round in the Itchiku Kubota Museum and artist studio.

=== The 'Symphony of Light' Collection ===
Kubota's 'Symphony of Light' Collection is a continuous series of dyed kimono, and Kubota's most significant and memorable work. It is the product of Kubota's interest in the effects of light upon nature, with Kubota once stating that "Light plunges everything into endlessly changing colour. Such light brings a special beauty to bloom".

The 'Symphony of Light' started out as a set of five kimono that, when shown together, would form a continuous landscape coloured by the light of a setting sun and adorned with tsujigahana motifs. This set was exhibited to great acclaim in a 1982 exhibition that toured 21 cities throughout Japan. The enthusiastic response encouraged Kubota to develop designs for another group of kimono that would further expand the series, and it was at this point that Kubota began to contemplate the production of a larger, more elaborate continuous group of panoramic kimono.

The 'Symphony of Light' series was radically different to Kubota's earlier kimono: they were oversized, based on the uchikake, the full-length, unbelted outerkimono with a trailing, padded hem, giving the garments a dramatic appearance. They were made with a heavier silk crepe woven with wefts of gold or silver, adding an extra reflective quality to the designs. The kimono were not designed to be wearable, and were instead intended to be panoramic works of art.

By 1986, Kubota had added ten more kimono to the series, and expanded his concept from kimono reflecting the golden light of autumn to kimono that showed winter. By this time, Kubota had envisioned the 'Symphony of Light' as a grand panorama of 80 continuous pieces. When Kubota died in 2003, 29 additional works representing autumn and winter, and five kimono from the 'Universe' series had been completed.

Since then, two additional works based on Kubota's designs for 'Universe' have been completed by Kobo, the Itchiku atelier, giving a total of 36 kimono to the 'Symphony of Light' collection.

=== 'Universe' series ===
The seven kimono that compose the 'Universe' series were first intended as part of the 'Symphony of Light' Collection. Kubota's initial concept called for a pyramid-shaped schematic formed from 13 kimono that together would echo Mount Fuji's triangular shape. The 'Universe' kimono were to be presented as a panorama of colour and light, whilst capturing Kubota's vision of Mount Fuji's molten core, symbolic of the beginnings of the Universe itself.

Only seven of these kimono were completed in this series before Kubota's death.

=== 'Oceans' series ===
Kubota's 'Oceans' series consists of five kimono, which were intended to play a part in the 'Symphony of Light' series. However, Kubota left little indication of where or how they should be positioned. Together, these kimono present a mini-series of mystical seascapes in which the line between ocean and sky is blurred, and islands seem to drift in and out, appearing more as mirages than real.

Kubota often used the terms 'seas' and 'oceans' almost interchangeably in his work. In this series, the oceans are vast and apparently uncontained, with no confining land masses to inhibit their flow.

=== 'Mount Fuji' series ===
Mountains hold a special place in Japanese religious and cultural beliefs, and Mount Fuji, Japan's tallest mountain, is the country's spiritual and cultural icon, the most sacred of three holy mountains in Japan. The mountain has been the object of pilgrimages and artworks for thousands of people over the centuries; for Kubota, Fuji was a sacred symbol that revealed new qualities each time he saw it.

Kubota's fascination with Fuji was conveyed in a series of 11 kimono, intended to be shown in succession, as a composition, but each also conceptualized to stand alone as well. Possibly influenced by French Impressionists such as Claude Monet, Kubota was determined to capture the mountain in its many moods, at different times of the day, and at different seasons, whilst showing the unique character of each work, with individual sense of nature and the play of light and form.

=== Individual works ===
As well as designing kimono intended to work as a series, Kubota also created a number of individual works in his signature 'itchiku tsujigahana' technique; some were intended for commercial sale and use, with others designed to be worn in Noh or kabuki. Other pieces were held back by Kubota himself for his own collection, as they represented milestones in the evolution of his art.

== Kubota and theatre ==
Kubota's interest in the theatre began in 1940 when, as a 23 year-old, he produced costumes for a master of stage design for kabuki and shinpa ("new school" theatre). At the same time, he studied traditional Japanese dance for insight into theatrical costumes and textiles.

After World War II, as a prisoner of war, Kubota created paper costumes for a prison theatre troupe. After his return home, Kubota continued his pursuit of the tsujigahana dyework technique, which also revived his theatrical interests. He started to incorporate theatrical elements into his work and design costumes for special dance and theatre performances.

Kubota based many of his art kimono on the uchikake, a traditional full-length, unbelted outer robe with a trailing, weighted hem. He eventually significantly increased the overall length of the kimono he designed, often adding borders to expand their size even further. These over-sized kimono were ideally suited to Noh theatrical performances, where costumes are often multi-layered, with unusual textures and bold designs that help to create the larger-than-life personas of actors on a Noh stage.

When Kubota built his own museum in 1994, he incorporated a Noh stage and developed his own style of performance, called 'itchiku-Noh'. He also encouraged performances of maimu, a theatrical style with much in common with Noh but a focus on modern works. Sometimes kimono were specially made for performances; other times works from the 'Universe' or 'Mount Fuji' series would appear on stage.

== Exhibitions ==
Kubota first exhibited his artistic kimono in 1977 in Tokyo. Shortly following this, after having held several shows around Japan, Kubota and his creations drew interest from the rest of the world, and his work was exhibited first in the United States in 1980, and then in France in 1983. His work was exhibited in the United Kingdom, Belgium and the Netherlands in 1989, before being shown in Spain and then France for a third time in 1990; his work was exhibited in the Palais de Tokyo in Paris.

In 1994 and 1995, Kubota's work returned to Japan, where it found a permanent home in Kawaguchi-ko, in the Kubota-designed and financed museum which preserves and showcases them to the present day. The following year, Kubota's work created a sensation at the Smithsonian, Washington, USA and the Canadian Museum of Civilizations, Hull; Kubota's works were also exhibited in Germany in 2000.

Following a large programme of exhibitions, the exhibition "Kimono as Art: the Landscapes of Itchiku Kubota" were exhibited between 2008 and 2009 in the San Diego Museum of Art and the Canton Museum of Art in Ohio, with over 100,000 guests enjoying the exhibition.

Since the acquisition of the Kubota Collection in 2011 by Dr. Patokh Chodiev, Founder of the International Chodiev Foundation, the international promotion and preservation of the artworks were conducted by the Foundation. As a result, the collection was received to critical acclaim in Kazakhstan and Russia in 2013-2014, the Netherlands, France and Belgium in 2015 – 2016, and Canada and USA in 2018.

In 2020, some of the Collection's key pieces were featured in "Kimono: Fashioning Identities" exhibition at the Tokyo National Museum.

Kubota's work can be seen year-round at the Itchiku Kubota Art Museum in Kawaguchi-ko in Yamanashi.

== The Itchiku Kubota Art Museum ==
The Itchiku Kubota Art Museum is located in the wooded hills along the northern coast of Lake Kawaguchi, in Yamanashi Prefecture of Japan. It is the former residence and workshop of the artist, and is now a permanent home to the Kubota Collection. For many years, Kubota dreamed of establishing a museum so that many people could visit to view his work. At the age of 74, he finally found, in his view, a perfect location – near Lake Kawaguchi, with a panoramic view of his beloved Mount Fuji.

Kubota purchased the site in 1991, and began construction with limited. After three years of construction, in 1994, the Itchiku Kubota Art Museum was opened to the public.

The main building, opened in October 1994, was constructed using a combination of traditional Japanese and Western techniques, representing the artist's unique worldview. The design is based on traditional Japanese architecture, but the structure evolves into a complex and spectacular pyramid-like puzzle of sixteen huge, 1000 year-old 13 m (43 ft)-tall wooden beams that are arranged in layers. The entryway to the museum is embellished by the mix of coral and limestone from Okinawa and sculptural ironwork by present-day artists, and features dramatically hand-carved doors sourced from India, Africa, and Southeast Asia. Artworks from various places in Asia and Africa are placed around the museum grounds.

A tea-room, "Itchiku-an", located at the back of the exhibition room, offers visitors green tea, sweets, and a beautiful view of the surroundings. A waterfall and outdoor stage are located besides the museum's reception building where events are occasionally held.

The New Wing of the museum opened in 1997, and was based upon the architecture of Antoni Gaudí. The walls of the New Wing are made of Ryukyu limestone (coral reef fossils) from the Low Ryukyu Islands of the Japan's coral reef. There is the "Tombodama Art Gallery", a shop selling original goods and itchiku tsujigahana-themed accessories, and an open-style cafe.

The garden around the museum was designed by Kubota, with the aim of accentuating the natural environment and showcasing the beauty of the surrounding area, combining Ryukyuan limestone, igneous rocks, and variety of local trees and spring water. Kubota worked with expert gardeners to place the decorative rocks, quiet ponds, streams, and waterfalls, combining the components for audio and visual effect.

In 2019, The Guardian included the Itchiku Kubota Art Museum into the list of top 10 Places to visit in Japan.

=== Awards ===
Over the years, Kubota's work received great acclaim both nationally and internationally. The itchiku tsujigahana technique gained worldwide recognition, with Kubota receiving significant awards for his work:

- An award from the Society for the Dissemination of Folk Costumes and Customs (1978)
- Fourth Annual Award of the Society for Furthering of Studies on Costume (1983)
- The Chevalier de l'Order des Arts at des Lettres from the French Ministry of Culture (1990)

=== Management of the Museum and the Kubota Collection ===
After Kubota's death in 2003, the museum struggled financially, and by 2010 was on the verge of bankruptcy, resulting in Kubota's kimono collection being put up for auction. In 2011, Dr. Patokh Chodiev, Founder of the International Chodiev Foundation and a long-time admirer of Japanese art and culture, purchased the entire collection of 104 kimono, saving it for Japan and for art lovers worldwide.

Since then, International Chodiev Foundation has been managing the international promotion and preservation of the Kubota Museum and its collection.

Everyday management of the museum is conducted by its Curator and Director, Sakuo Miyahara. Miyahara had worked alongside Kubota for a quarter of the century, starting out as Kubota's main apprentice in 1978, right up to his death in 2003.

The Kubota Collection is curated by Dr. Jacqueline Atkins, a textile historian, and former Chief Curator for the Allentown Art Museum in Pennsylvania. Dr. Atkins has written and lectured extensively on Japanese early modern textiles and garments, as well as Japanese and American quilt history.

== Documentary about Itchiku Kubota ==
In 2013, a Russian filmmaker Radik Kudoyarov presented 'Kubota Kimonos: a History on Silk', a documentary about the life and art of Kubota.

In 2021, the film was shortlisted by the jury of international Master of Art Film Festival in Bulgaria ('Arts Horizons' nomination), and was screened at The Art of Brooklyn Film Festival.
