= Jewish National Fund Tree of Life Award =

Tree of Life Award
- Awarded for: outstanding community involvement
- Country: Israel
- Presented by: Jewish National Fund

The Tree of Life Award is the highest humanitarian award the Jewish National Fund presents to one individual or family each year in appreciation of their outstanding community involvement, their dedication to the cause of American-Israeli friendship, and their devotion to peace and the security of human life. The award recognizes leaders of achievements and innovations in industry, government and education. Past awardees have included individuals who have made diverse contributions from Isaac Stern, to Arthur G. Cohen, Donald Trump and Susan Polgar. Past presenters of the award have included Margaret Thatcher and Shimon Peres.

== Recipients ==
- John W. Barfield (Founder The Bartech Group, Inc.; author; philanthropist)
- Ron & Daron Barness
- Sid & Alicia Belzberg
- Raymond Brown & Wanda Akin Brown
- Ben Carson
- Chris Christie, governor
- Arthur G. Cohen
- Bonnie Comley
- William Cunningham (President of the University of Texas)
- Paul Dresselhaus (1999)
- Elizabsth H. Dole
- Richard Egan
- Tovah Feldshuh
- Carly Fiorina, former CEO and presidential candidate
- Ohio Lt. Governor Lee Fisher
- Steven Goodstein
- Former Vice President Al Gore
- Dr. John C. Hitt
- Kathy Ireland
- New York Congressman Steve Israel
- N. Richard Kalikow
- John Adam Kanas
- Gary L. Krupp (2001) (Founder Pave the Way Foundation, Inc)
- Stewart F. Lane
- Michael J. Lazar
- Jeffrey E. Levine
- M. David Low (President of UT-Houston)
- William C. McCahill
- M. Peter McPherson
- Akron Mayor Don Plusquellic
- Jana Robbins
- Stephen M. Ross
- Susan Polgar
- Secretary of State Colin Powell
- Jana Robbins
- Stephen M. Ross
- Roy J. Saunders
- Henry Segerstrom – presented in 1995 by Margaret Thatcher
- Fred & Shari Schenk
- Isaac Stern
- Donald Trump
- Jerry Zaks
- Mort Zuckerman
