= The Theatre Museum =

Theatre museum in New York City

Coordinates: 40°45′35.76″N 73°59′1.98″W

The Theatre Museum (TTM) is located at 30 Worth Street in Manhattan, New York City. Its mission is to preserve, protect and perpetuate the legacy of theatre, including Broadway theatre. The Theatre Museum continues the legacy of The Broadway Theatre Institute begun in 1995 by presenting Awards for Excellence in Theatre History Preservation and Theatre Arts Education. It currently functions as a museum-at-large and is not open to the public.

== History ==
From 1986 – 2003, the Broadway Theatre Institute developed programs that fostered the appreciation of theatre in New York and served more than 100,000 school children and adults in New York City. It merged with the Theatre Museum in 2003.

== Activities ==
In 2007, the annual Awards for Excellence Ceremony honored actress Ellen Burstyn, The New York Times Chief Theater Critic Ben Brantley, actor, dancer and choreographer Carmen de Lavallade, and Arts Horizons, an institution that uses professional performers to foster creativity in students.

The Theatre Museum has mounted exhibitions in New York throughout the year celebrating the history of the theatre, but none in a long time. Exhibitions included the architecture of the historic Times Square theatres, and the history of the American showboat, which brought entertainment on adapted barges along rivers throughout the country.

The showboat exhibition display in Red Hook, Brooklyn until May 2008 included panels displaying images of showboats, Playbills, programs, production photographs and written descriptions, artifacts, oral histories of those who lived on these entertainment barges, video clips, a painted scrim, and a calliope on performance days.

The Theatre Museum has a photo collection of historic Broadway shows, which was donated by board member Basil Hero, president of Broadway Digital Entertainment, a pioneer in preserving Broadway’s greatest masterpieces.

== Board ==
The founding members of The Theatre Museum in 2003 were Helen Marie Guditis, Tony Award winning producer Stewart F. Lane, Richard F. Bernstein, Linda B. Leff and William Rappaport.

Ms. Guditis sat on Manhattan Community Board 5 and represented that board on the Times Square Alliance Board of Directors, which serves the Theater District in New York City. She has also served on the board of directors of the League of Professional Theatre Women and the New York Women’s Agenda.

The Theatre Museum’s board of trustees included Stewart F. Lane, Helen Marie Guditis, George Thomas, William Walters, James Heinze and Basil Hero.

Mr. Lane is a writer, director and producer whose credits include Fiddler on the Roof, Thoroughly Modern Millie and La Cage aux Folles, which won him his first Tony Award at the age of 33. Mr. Hero has been cited in The New York Times for his work with PBS to digitally preserve such masterpieces as the original Death of a Salesman with Lee J. Cobb and The Iceman Cometh with Jason Robards. William Walters is a VP of Theatrical Stage Workers Local One I.A.T.S.E.

== Award recipients ==
1995

- Jujamcyn Theaters - Theatre History Preservation
- Mary C. Henderson - Theatre Arts Education

1997

- The Empire State Development Fund - Theatre History Preservation
- The Theatre Development Fund - Theatre Arts Education
- Gwen Verdon - Lifetime Achievement

1999

- George Mason University - Theatre History Preservation
- American Theater Wing - Theatre Arts Education
- Celeste Holm - Distinguished Contributor to the Theatre
- Mortimer Becker - Lifetime Achievement

2000

- Harvard Theatre Collection - Theatre History Preservation
- New York University - Theatre Arts Education
- The Drama Book Shop - Distinguished Service to the Theatre
- Tharon Musser - Lifetime Achievement
- Honoring 100th Anniversary of The Shubert Organization - Special Award

2002

- The Theatre Historical Society of America - Theatre History Preservation
- The Paper Bag Players - Theatre Arts Education
- New York City Police Department and New York City Fire Department - Distinguished Service to the Theatre
- Tony Walton - Lifetime Achievement
- Richard Rogers in Celebration of his 100th Birthday - Special Award

2003

- The Players - Theatre History Preservation
- The BMI- Lehman Engel Musical Theatre Workshop - Theatre Arts Education
- Materials for the Arts - Distinguished Service to the Theatre
- John Willis - Lifetime Achievement
- St. Malachy's-The Actors' Chapel's 100th Anniversary - Special Award

2004

- Dodger Costumes - Theatre History Preservation
- F.H. LaGuardia High School of Music & Art and Performing Arts - Theatre Arts Education
- The Princess Grace Foundation USA - Distinguished Service to the Theatre
- Betty Comden - Lifetime Achievement
- Commemorating the 100th Anniversary of Times Square - Special Award

2005

- Laurence Maslon and Michael Kantor for their PBS Broadway Series - Theatre History Preservation
- Periwinlkle Productionsand Ten Chimney's Foundation - Theatre Arts Education

2006

- Fred Papert and The Manhattan Theatre Club - Theatre History Preservation
- Lundeana M. Thomas Ph. D and The Drama League Directors Project - Theatre Arts Education

2007

- Ben Brantley - Theatre History Preservation
- Carmen de Lavallade and Arts Horizons - Theatre Arts Education
- Ellen Burstyn - Lifetime Achievement

2008

- Five Towns College - Theatre Arts Education
- Ricky McKay - Individual Theatre History Preservation
- The Theatre Museum of Repertoire America - Organization Theatre History Preservation
- Joe Franklin - Lifetime Achievement

2010

- The Mint Theatre Company – Theatre History Preservation
- Samuel French, Inc. – Theatre Arts Education
- Richard M. Sherman and Robert B. Sherman – Career Achievement

2011

- Frank Cullen – Theatre History Preservation
- Frank Sinatra High School for the Arts – Theatre Arts Education
- Sheldon Harnick – Career Achievement
- Bonnie Comley – Distinguished Service to the Theatre

2012

- Don B. Wilmeth – Theatre History Preservation
- Stagedoor Manor – Theatre Arts Education
- Fred Olsson – Career Achievement
- Theatre Communications Group – Distinguished Service to the Theatre

2013

- Emerson College – Theatre Arts Education
- Helen M. Guditis – Distinguished Service to the Theatre
- 100th Anniversary of The Palace Theatre - Special Award

2014

- Fathom Events - Theatre History Preservation
- BroadwayWorld - Theatre Arts Education
- 100th Anniversary of The Marx Brothers - Special Award
