= International Chodiev Foundation =

NGO created in 1996 by Patokh Chodiev

- Established: 1996 (30 years ago)
- Founders: Patokh Chodiev
- Types: international non-governmental organization
- Headquarters: Liechtenstein
- Website: internationalchodievfoundation.com

The International Chodiev Foundation or ICF (Russian Международный фонд Шодиева), founded in 1996 by Uzbek billionaire Patokh Chodiev, is a non-governmental charitable organization headquartered in Liechtenstein.

Established with the initial goal of providing grants and scholarship programs to support students at the Moscow State Institute of International Relations (MGIMO), the International Chodiev Foundation has since evolved into an international philanthropic center for academic research, the arts and children's causes. ICF is one of the oldest charitable foundations in modern Russia. It operates in Ukraine, Russia, Kazakhstan, Uzbekistan and Japan.

In 2020, in her book, "The Future of Philanthropy in Russia: The Experience of the International Chodiev Foundation," author Olga Monakhova analyzes the model of "one of the largest charitable foundations in the CIS".

== Actions ==
=== Child protection ===
The foundation supports various activities related to child protection, with assistance to schools, orphanages and medical institutions for disabled children. ICF's Uzbek representative office provides humanitarian and health assistance to orphanages.

In 2002, the foundation helped to rebuild an orphanage in Moscow, and then supported the Odesa Children's Rehabilitation Center, which was founded in 1996 by Ukrainian coach and Odesa City Council deputy Boris Davidovich Litvak. The International Chodiev Foundation is one of the main financial supporters of the center.

ICF has been supporting the "SMIrotvorets" journalism competition for several years. The aim of the competition is to identify qualitative journalistic works and projects in Russia that are dedicated to intercultural relations between different nations and ethnic groups. ICF supports the special nomination "Great Media for Children and Youth".

=== Health ===
During the COVID-19 pandemic, the foundation provided food and disinfectants to the elderly and low-income families in Uzbekistan. It also provides humanitarian assistance to the Tashkent Charity Coordination Center, and purchases medical equipment and personal protective equipment for doctors at the Ministry of Health's Virology Research Institute.

=== Education ===
In 1996, ICF came to the aid of MGIMO University by providing salaries and housing for several teachers. Since then, ICF has continued to support MGIMO by offering annual scholarships to students and candidates, paying for internships for students and teachers, financing events, scientific research, and publishing activities.

In 2007, Patokh Chodiev and two other MGIMO alumni created the "MGIMO Foundation" which they each financed with 125 million rubles, thus constituting the first Russian endowment fund. This was to be a guarantee of stability and growth for the university. The three founders of the MGIMO Foundation are now members of the university's board of directors.

In 2020, the foundation continues its program of scholarships and awards for the best students of MGIMO University who do not have sufficient financial resources to continue their studies.

ICF and the MGIMO Tashkent branch also signed a memorandum of cooperation until 2025, according to which the Foundation, which has already allocated funds for the purchase of technical equipment and transportation, undertook, from summer 2021, to finance undergraduate studies at MGIMO and to grant scholarships to students.

=== Japanese art ===
After living in Japan for several years, where he worked as a specialist in Soviet-Japanese relations, Patokh Chodiev became fascinated by Japanese art, to which he decided to contribute through his foundation. Its objective is to preserve the cultural heritage of Japan.

The Foundation cooperates with the Association of Japanologists of the Russian Federation and supports its scientific and publishing activities. Since 2009, it has been the main sponsor of the J-Fest, an event in Russia. The foundation also sponsors the Russian Culture Festival in Japan and the Children of Russia 2021 photo contest. The festival is said to have brought Russian culture to 18 million Japanese people in 92 cities.

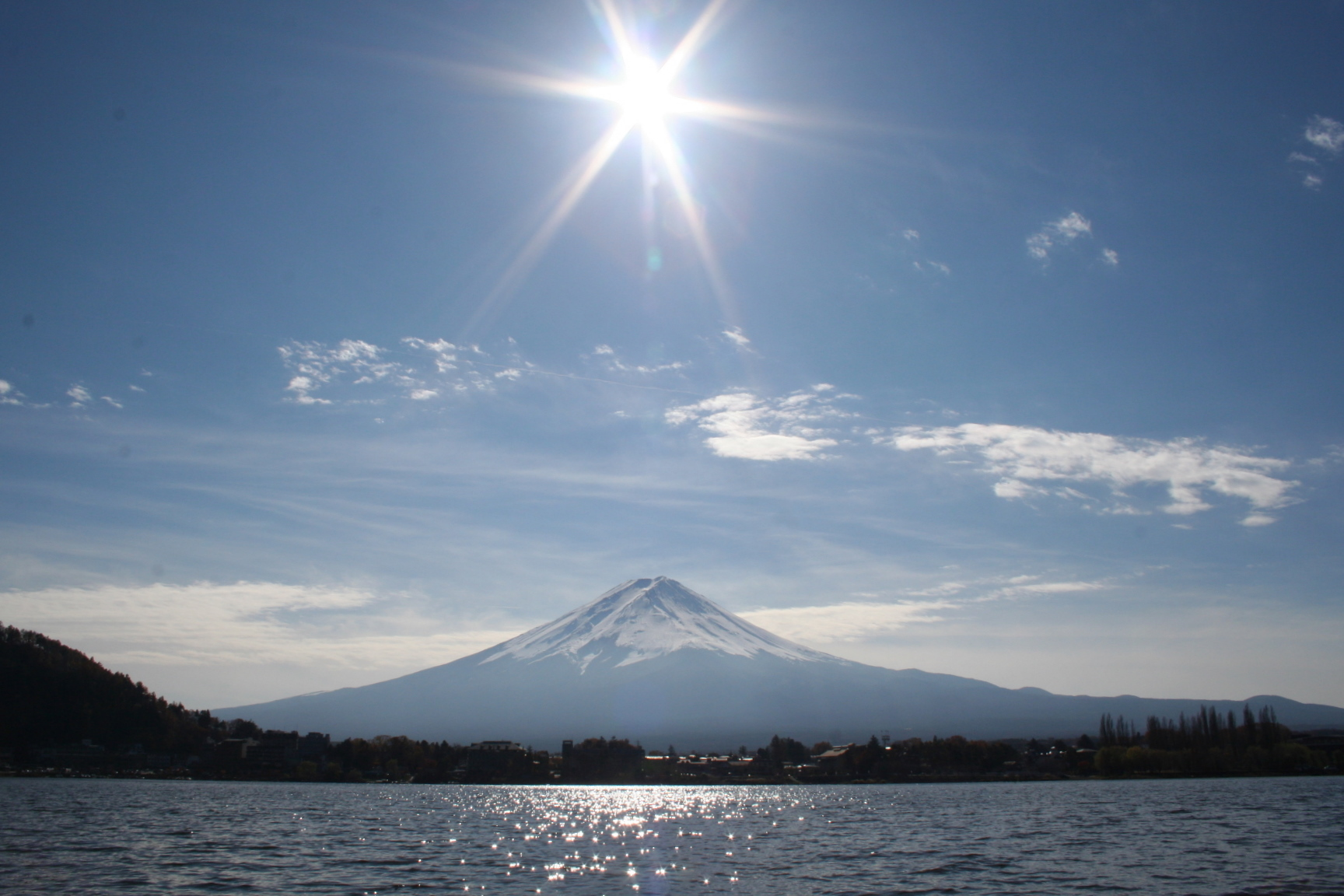
Mount Fuji from the lake Kawaguchi

In 2011, the Itchiku Kubota Art Museum in Kawaguchi was on the verge of bankruptcy. The foundation bought the Japanese fabric designer's collection of 104 kimono paintings for $3 million. Several kimonos in a row represent a single image.

Between 2013 and 2020, ICF is organizing 15 kimono exhibitions in 8 countries, including Russia, Kazakhstan, the Netherlands, France, Belgium (at the ModeMuseum Antwerpen), the United States, and Canada. In 2015, the collection was presented at the Guimet Museum in Paris. In March 2020, at the Victoria and Albert Museum in London, for the exhibition "Kimono: Kyoto to Catwalk". In June 2020, the designer's kimonos were presented at the exhibition "Kimono: Fashioning Identities" at the Tokyo National Museum.

In 2019, as a result of ICF's involvement, the Itchiku Kubota Art Museum was named one of the top 10 places to visit in Japan by The Guardian.

In 2019, Chodiev received the title of "Patron of the Year" from the Russian Ministry of Culture within the framework of the Eighth International Cultural Forum of the city of Saint Petersburg for financing the Russian tour of the traditional Japanese Kabuki Theater. In the same year, the foundation supports the production of two documentaries entitled "Japan Has Many Faces" and "On the Road to Trust: Russians in Japan." The documentaries are broadcast on the television channel "Big Asia". The channel also broadcasts a film about the foundation's safeguarding of the collection of Itchiku Kubota kimonos for two seasons.

=== Development of Uzbekistan ===
With its Uzbek representative office opened in 2017, the International Chodiev Foundation is one of the main sponsors of the forum "Uzbekistan 2035" organized by the NGO Buyuk Kelajak, a newly created NGO to support the development of Uzbekistan and define its strategy for 2035.

== See also ==
- Patokh Chodiev
- Moscow State Institute of International Relations
