= Ward Morehouse III =

American writer

Ward Morehouse III (August 11, 1945 – May 21, 2019) was an American author, playwright and newspaperman. He was known particularly for his books on the grand hotels of New York City and London.

== Early life ==
Morehouse was born in New York City on August 11, 1945, the son of newspaperman/drama critic Ward Morehouse II and actress-turned-publisher Joan Marlowe. He grew up in New York City hotels and relocated to Darien, Connecticut, when his mother remarried. He graduated from Darien High School in 1963 and attended the American Academy of Dramatic Arts for two years before joining the acting company of the American Shakespeare Festival in 1966.

Morehouse held various jobs from 1966 to 1969 while writing plays and attending Columbia University School of General Studies at night. In 1969, he joined the New York Post as a copy boy, briefly becoming a police reporter in 1972.

== 1970s and 1980s ==
Morehouse was a staff correspondent at The Christian Science Monitor from 1973 through 1983. From 1973 to 1976, he covered business and consumer issues in Boston. He also wrote a lengthy series on New England railroads, rural poverty and business. After transferring to The Monitor's New York City bureau, Morehouse covered politics, stories of New York life, and increasingly, entertainment-based pieces about Broadway from 1977 to 1983. After 1983, he continued to freelance for The Monitor and write for additional publications, including Theatre Magazine, The Baltimore Sun and The Philadelphia Inquirer.

Morehouse's play, The Actors, was first produced Off-Off Broadway at the Troupe Theatre in November 1982. In 1986, The Actors was produced at the Royal Court Theatre on Manhattan's West Side and ran until May 1987. He produced his next play My Four Mothers at the Jan Hus Theatre with a $10,000 grant from the Lambs Foundation of the Lambs Club. Over the next few years, Morehouse had two other plays produced Off-Off Broadway.

== 1990s ==
In 1991, M Evans & Company published Morehouse's first book The Waldorf-Astoria: America's Gilded Dream. In 1993, Morehouse began freelancing on a regular basis for the Reuters, covering The Business of Broadway and writing occasional reviews of Broadway shows for Reuters as well as Reuters TV. In 1994, he returned to the New York Post. Morehouse left The Post in 1998, but continued to freelance celebrity news stories for them until 2000.

== 2000 to present ==
Morehouse ended his freelancing with the New York Post in 2000, his last interview with Katharine Hepburn. In 2002, he joined the [regenerated] New York Sun as the Broadway After Dark columnist, reviving the popular column initiated by his father for the original New York Sun. He held that post until late 2004 when he joined amNew York. Morehouse worked for amNew York for two years, after which he brought the column to The Epoch Times.

In 2001, If It Was Easy, a play Morehouse co-wrote with Stewart F. Lane, a Broadway producer and theater owner, was produced Off-Broadway at the Douglas Fairbanks Theatre. It ran for four months. Also that year, his second book, Inside the Plaza: An Intimate Portrait of the Ultimate Hotel was published by Applause Theatre and Cinema Books, an imprint of the Hal Leonard Corporation.

In 2006, Morehouse wrote Life at the Top: Inside New York's Grand Hotels, one of three books to be published with BearManor Media. This was followed by Discovering the Hudson, a history of the historic Hudson Theatre in 2007. In 2010 Morehouse wrote London's Grand Hotels, a history of nearly 30 London grand hotels, including The Savoy, The Dorchester, and Brown's. It was also published by BearManor Media. This book made Morehouse one of the top hotel authors in America.

In 2010, Morehouse co-wrote the play Gangplank with Mark Druck, which was produced by the American Theatre of Actors on West 54th Street as an Off-Off Broadway production.

== Present ==
Morehouse wrote a monthly Checking In column for TravelSmart Newsletter about hotels from San Francisco to New England and a number in London, Brussels and Paris. In April 2012 Applause Theatre and Cinema Books published a revised and updated version of his book "Inside the Plaza". He was also a drama critic for Black Tie Magazine.

== Works ==
=== Plays ===
- The Actors, November 1982
- Trunk Full of Memories, 1989
- My Four Mothers, 1987
- Mr. Doom Gets A Letter (based on a play by Ward Morehouse II), 1991
- If It Was Easy (with Stewart F. Lane) (Performing Books/Applause, 2002)
- Gangplank (with Mark Druck) 2010

=== Books ===
- The Waldorf-Astoria: America's Gilded Dream, (M Evans & Company, 1991)
- Inside the Plaza: An Intimate Portrait of the Ultimate Hotel (Applause Theatre and Cinema Books, 2001)
- The Caedmon School: An Anecdotal History and Appreciation, with Gregory A. Minahan (Xlibris Corp – April 2003)
- Life at the Top: Inside New York's Grand Hotels (BearManor Media, 2006)
- Broadway After Dark, Ward Morehouse II & Ward Morehouse III (BearManor Media February 2007)
- Discovering the Hudson (BearManor Media, 2007)
- London's Grand Hotels (BearManor Media, 2010)
