= Jana Robbins =

American actress

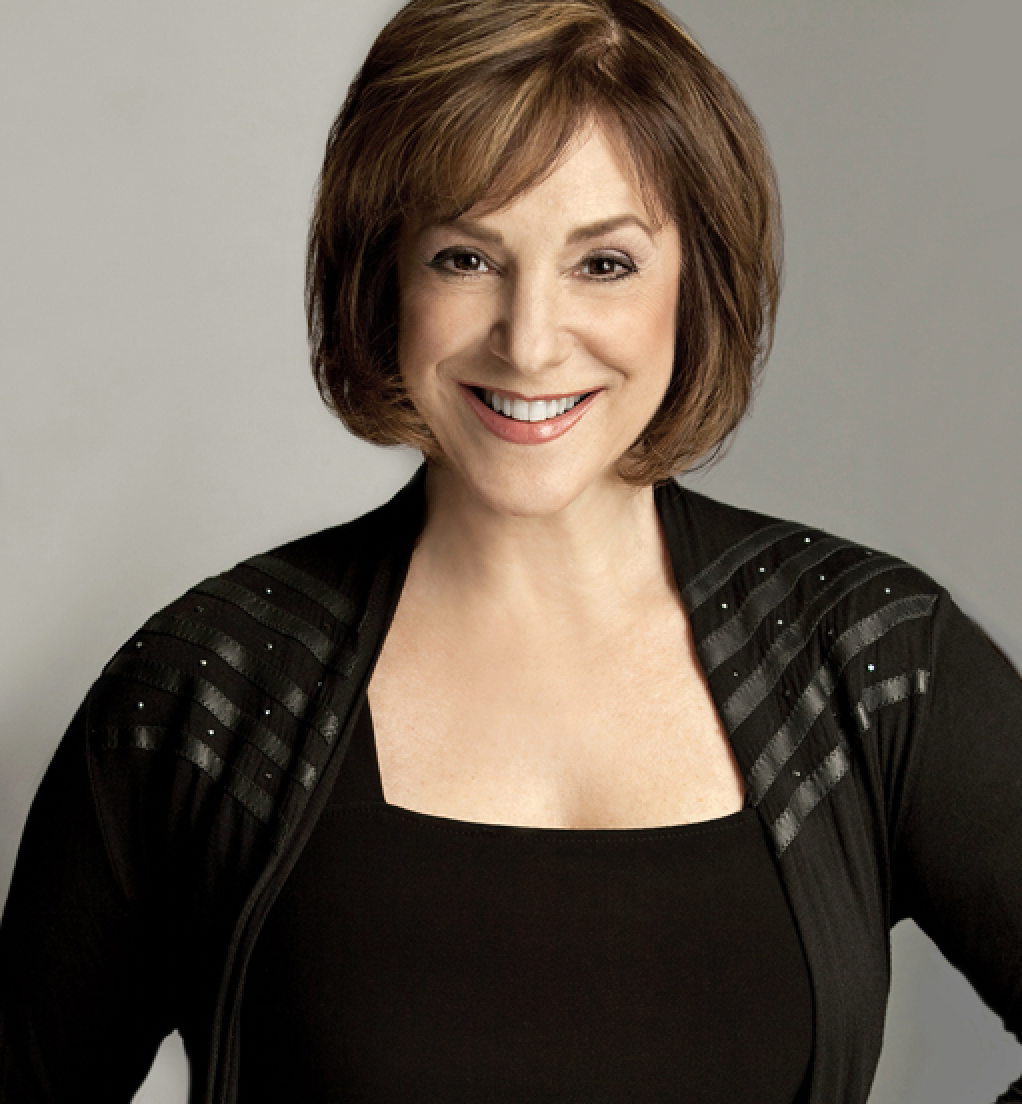
- Born: April 18, 1947 (age 79)
- Education: Stephens College (BFA)
- Occupations: Producer; actress; director; teacher; speaker
- Website: janarobbinsproductions.com

Jana Robbins is a Tony, Olivier and Drama Desk Award-winning American producer, actress, director, teacher, and speaker. She has produced and won awards for her West End, Broadway and Off-Broadway productions.

== Early life ==
Robbins was born on April 18, 1947, and raised in Johnstown, Pennsylvania. Daughter of Phillip and Edythe Eisenberg, she is the middle child of three children. Her mother studied at the Gene Kelly Studio of Dance in Johnstown, PA with Gene Kelly himself. Her father, a businessman and owner of Consolidated Vending Machine Company, also owned The Golden Key Restaurant and Lounge, where 16 year old Robbins could be found singing.

With her mother's encouragement, she first began performing in recitals at the Gene Kelly Studio of Dance, and got her first solo at 6 years old. She continued to star in various school productions in high school. She received a BFA in Theater from Stephens College in Columbia, Missouri in 1967.

== Career ==
=== 1960s ===
Robbins attended her first New York City theater production, Man of La Mancha, when she was 21 years old. Less than a year later in 1969, she appeared as Aldonza in the Broadway National Tour.

=== 1970s ===
In 1974, Robbins made her Broadway debut in Good News as Patricia Bingham and standby for Alice Fay as Professor Kenyon. One year later in 1975, she toured as The Leader in Zorba with Theodore Bikell. In 1976, she appeared in “Tickles by Tucholsky” Off-Broadway. That same year, she played Louise in Gypsy at Paper Mill Playhouse in Millburn, New Jersey. In 1977, she played Cleo and Monica in I Love My Wife on Broadway. In 1979, she appeared in the Off-Broadway show “The All Night Strut!”

=== 1980s ===
In 1983, Robbins starred as Lenny McGrath in Crimes of the Heart on Broadway. That same year, she toured as Melba in Pal Joey starring Joel Grey. Also in 1983, she starred as Colette in the York Theatre Company's production of Collette Collage.

In 1984, she starred as Ruth Van Horn in a regional production of Follow Thru at the Goodspeed Opera House in Connecticut. Also in 1984, she starred in a New York production of Circus Gothic.

She returned to Broadway in 1988 in Romance, Romance. She finished off the decade in the original cast of the 1989 Broadway revival of Gypsy, in which she played Mazeppa and served as a standby for Mama Rose.

=== 1990s ===
Robbins completed her Broadway run in Gypsy as Mazeppa and standby for Tyne Daly as Mama Rose in 1991. In 1992, she made her first foray into screen acting as a guest star on Cheers. Throughout the course of the decade, she had roles in Family Album, The Home Court, Bless This House, Mother, Roseanne, The Last Days of Frankie the Fly, Executive Target, Night Stand, and Babylon 5.

In 1995, Robbins began her career as a producer by forming Better World Productions. She developed, directed, and produced The Participant in association with Chazz Palminteri, written by and starring Dayton Callie in Los Angeles which was nominated for a Best Solo Performance Award by LA Weekly.

In 1997, she returned to the stage as Alda in a regional production of Death Takes a Holiday at the Lobero Theater in Santa Barbara, California. The following year, she reprised her role as Mazeppa in Gypsy at the Paper Mill Playhouse in Millburn, New Jersey and served as standby for Betty Buckley as Mama Rose.

In 1999, she performed in So Long, 174th Street! in a concert staging at the 14th Street Y in New York City.

=== 2000s ===
In 2000, Robbins played Ethel McCormack in the National Tour of Footloose.

Also in 2000, Robbins appeared in The Tale of the Allergist’s Wife on Broadway as the standby for Marjorie and Lee. After the show closed on Broadway in 2002, Robbins went on to play Lee in the National Tour opposite Valerie Harper.

Robbins made her Broadway producing debut in 2005 with Allan Knee's Little Women starring Sutton Foster and Maureen McGovern, which garnered a Tony nomination for Sutton Foster in the leading role. Also that year, she was honored with the Tree of Life Award by the Jewish National Fund. In 2006, she produced an Off-Broadway production of I Love You Because.

Also in 2006, Robbins starred as Bessie in a production of Awake and Sing! at the Arena Stage in New York City. In 2007, she played The Attic Lady in The As If Body Loop in the Humana Festival of New American Plays in Louisville, Kentucky.

Throughout the decade, Robbins had roles in television shows Law and Order: SVU, Law and Order: Criminal Intent, and Law and Order. She had roles in the movies Stanley Cuba and The Women.

In 2008, she began early development as executive producer on The Jazz Age, which had its first developmental production at 59E59th street in New York City. In 2009, The Jazz Age had another developmental production with The Blank Theater Company in Los Angeles, California.

=== 2010s ===
In 2010, Robbins received a Tony nomination for “Best Revival of a Musical" for her part in helping to transfer the Kennedy Center production of Ragtime to Broadway with producer Kevin McCollum.

Also in 2010, Robbins produced White’s Lies Off-Broadway at New World Stages in New York City.

In 2011, she produced the Off-Broadway production Through the Night with producer Daryl Roth and starred as The Chaperone in a 2011 production of The Drowsy Chaperone at the Victoria Theater in Ohio. In 2012, she originated the role of Maxine in the world premiere of Managing Maxine at the Alliance Theatre in Atlanta, Georgia.

In 2012, Robbins returned to her alma mater Stephen's College as the guest artistic director of their Okoboji Summer Theater, where she directed Crimes of the Heart, in which she previously appeared on Broadway, and Little Women, which she previously produced on Broadway.

She also continued her television acting career with 2014 appearances in Nurse Jackie and The Good Wife.

In 2016, Robbins joined the advisory board of The National Yiddish Theater Folksbiene and served as lead producer of the world premiere production of Roof of the World at Kansas City Repertory Theatre.

In 2017, Robbins starred as Janet in the Off-Broadway show This One’s For the Girls at St. Luke's Theater in New York City. That same year, she produced and starred as Rita in Johnny Manhattan at the Meadow Brook Theatre in Rochester, Michigan. She also directed the 2017 Off-Broadway production of She Has a Name. The following year in 2018, she appeared as Alice in Clever Little Lies at Penquin Rep.

In 2018, Robbins stepped up as the lead commercial producer of Fiddler on the Roof in Yiddish, along with producing partner Hal Luftig, to transfer The National Yiddish Theater Folksbeine's production of Fiddler on the Roof in Yiddish directed by Joel Grey up town to Off-Broadway's Stage 42. The show garnered both she and Hal Luftig the 2019 Drama Desk Award for “Outstanding Revival of a Musical,” the New York Outer Critics Circle Award for “Best Revival of a Musical,” the Drama Critics Circle Award “Special Citation,” and the Off-Broadway Alliance Award for “Best Musical Revival.”

Robbins also won the 2018 Olivier Award as a producer on the West End production of Company directed by Marianne Elliot, which opened on Broadway in March, 2020.

She and Haley Swindal starred in their duo Cabaret Show "WE JUST MOVE ON!" The Songs of Kander and Ebb at Broadway's 54 Below, which was voted One Of The Best Cabaret Shows of 2018 by Theatrepizzaz Magazine.

In 2019, Robbins directed and produced the UK premiere and Off-West End developmental production of The Jazz Age by Allan Knee at the Playground Theatre with partners Haley Swindal, Craig Haffner, and Sherry Wright. They also produced the World Premiere of The Astonishing Times of Timothy Cratchit, a new musical with book by Allan Knee and music and lyrics by Andre Catrini, in association with Hope Aria Productions at The Hope Mill Theatre in Manchester, England.

=== 2020s ===
In addition to "Company's 2021 transfer from West End to Broadway, Jana's award-winning show "Fiddler on the Roof in Yiddish" returned to off-Broadway by popular demand for a limited engagement in 2022 and 2023 at New World Stages.

Also in 2023, Jana founded Pinnacle Productions with fellow Broadway producer Haley Swindal. Most recently, Pinnacle Productions produced "Rose" starring actress Dame Maureen Lipman at The Ambassadors Theatre on London's West End, as well as "Death Note" at London's Palladium and The Lyric Theatre, West End. Pinnacle also produced "The Shark is Broken" on Broadway.

In 2024 Jana returned to the stage in "A Final Choice" at The Chain Theater and Pinnacle Productions produced "Your Lie In April at The Harold Pinter Theater in the West End. In 2025 Jana produced "Glorious" at The Hope Mill Theater in Manchester, England with Thomas Hopkins and "This Bitter Earth" directed by Billy Porter at The Soho Theater, West End. A Pre-Broadway Developmental Production of "Damn Yankees" directed by Sergio Trujillo played Arena Stage in DC and will open on Broadway in 2027 starring Neil Patrick Harris.

== Awards ==
- Tony Award for "Best Revival of a Musical" - Company (2021)
- Drama Desk Award for “Outstanding Revival of a Musical” - Fiddler on the Roof in Yiddish (2019)
- New York Outer Critics Circle Award for “Best Revival of a Musical” - Fiddler on the Roof in Yiddish (2019)
- Drama Critics Circle Award “Special Citation” - Fiddler on the Roof in Yiddish (2019)
- Off-Broadway Alliance Award for “Best Musical Revival” - Fiddler on the Roof in Yiddish (2019)
- Olivier Award for Company (2018)
- Top 10 Cabaret Shows of 2018 for We Just Move On! The Songs of Kander and Ebb by Times Square Chronicles
- Theater Resources Unlimited “Spirit of Theater” Award (2017)
- Dayton Critics Award for "Best Actress in a Play" for Managing Maxine (2012)
- Tony Nomination for Ragtime (2010)
- Tree of Life Award Jewish National Fund (2005)
- Carbonell Award "Best Actress" for Run for Your Wife (1985)
- "Best Supporting Actress in a Musical" for Gypsy Paper Mill Playhouse (1976)
