= If It Was Easy =

Play by Stewart F. Lane

If It Was Easy is a play written by Stewart F. Lane and Ward Morehouse III. The play is a greatly exaggerated version of a real life article on the front page of the New York Post involving Lane and Morehouse after the death of Frank Sinatra. The play ran off-broadway at The Douglas Fairbanks Theater in New York City. It was nominated for an American Theatre Critics Association’s Best New Play Award in 2000.

== Synopsis ==
Legendary producer Steve Gallop, suddenly down on his luck, is seduced by the charms of a beautiful showbiz columnist, Randi Lester, who is betting she can improve Gallop’s Broadway track record with a musical based on the life of Frank Sinatra. The idea is to attract front page attention around the world; hundreds of Sinatra wannabes swamp Gallop’s offices. Investors plead for a piece of the action. Not among the pleading masses is mobster Joey Fingers, whose “family” knew Sinatra, and who naturally expects to bankroll the entire show. On the opening night, it looks like curtains for the whole cast until Joey gets an offer he can not refuse.

== Productions ==
- The Douglas Fairbanks Theater ( NYC)
- 7Stages Theater (Atlanta, GA)
- Berkshire Theatre Festival (MA)
- Actors Theatre of Nantucket (MA)
- Guild Hall (East Hampton, NY)

== Off-Broadway opening night cast ==
- John Jellison
- Bonnie Comley
- Vicki Van Tassel
- William Marshall Miller
- Brad Bellamy
- Christian Kauffman
- Martin LaPlatney
- Gustave Johnson
