= In the Wings (play) =

- Written by: Stewart F. Lane
- Original language: English
- Genre: Comedy

In The Wings is a comedy written by Tony Award winner Stewart F. Lane. It was produced off-Broadway at the Promenade Theater in New York City in 2005. Because the play is set in New York City in 1977, the costumes and sets become secondary characters. The off-Broadway production included many bell bottoms, fringed vests and smiley faces. The play was first presented as a staged reading at The Revelation Theater starring Shannen Doherty and directed by Mr. Lane.

== Plot synopsis ==
Two aspiring young actors, Melinda and Steve, in love with each other and the theatre get their big break when they are cast in a new musical by their Svengali-like acting teacher, Bernardo. But when the show moves to Broadway, only Melinda is asked to move with it. Their relationship is tested as well as their acting, singing and dancing skills. Steve's mother makes frequent visits to the couple's apartment with advice and money.

== Opening night cast ==
- Lisa Datz - Melinda Donahugh
- Brian Henderson - Nicky Sanchez
- Josh Prince - Steve Leonards
- Peter Scolari - Bernardo
- Marilyn Sokol - Martha Leonards

== Production credits ==
- Jeremy Dobrish - Director
- William Barclay - Set Designer
- Phil Monat - Lighting Designer
- Jill B C DuBoff - Sound Designer
- Pamela Edington - Production Stage Manager
- Liz Lewis - Casting
- Bonnie Comley - Producer
