= Arts Horizons =

Arts Horizons is a not-for-profit arts-in-education organization that provides live professional performances and artist-in-residence programs to students and professional development for teachers throughout New York, New Jersey and Connecticut. Arts Horizons’ mission is "to foster development of the whole person and to improve education by delivering quality arts programs and activities to schools and communities."

The organization was founded in 1978 by John Devol under the name "Festival of Music." In 1995, the organization changed its title to "Arts Horizons". Arts Horizons has, since its founding, presented programs to over eight million students, teachers and community members.

In 2008 Arts Horizons created the Paul Newman Award for Services to Arts and Children. The award is bestowed to individuals who have exhibited outstanding contributions to arts education. Also in 2008, LeRoy Neiman donated $1 million to the organization to open its first permanent youth arts center in Harlem.

== Arts Horizons Paul Newman Award recipients ==
- 2010 Paul Simon
- 2009 Stewart F. Lane and Bonnie Comley
- 2008 Marvin Hamlisch

== Notes ==
- A Second Career: Getting the Arts Into the Schools, By RALPH BLUMENTHAL, The New York Times, April 25, 1996
