= Tsujigahana =

Japanese dyeing technique revived in the 20th century by Itchiku Kubota

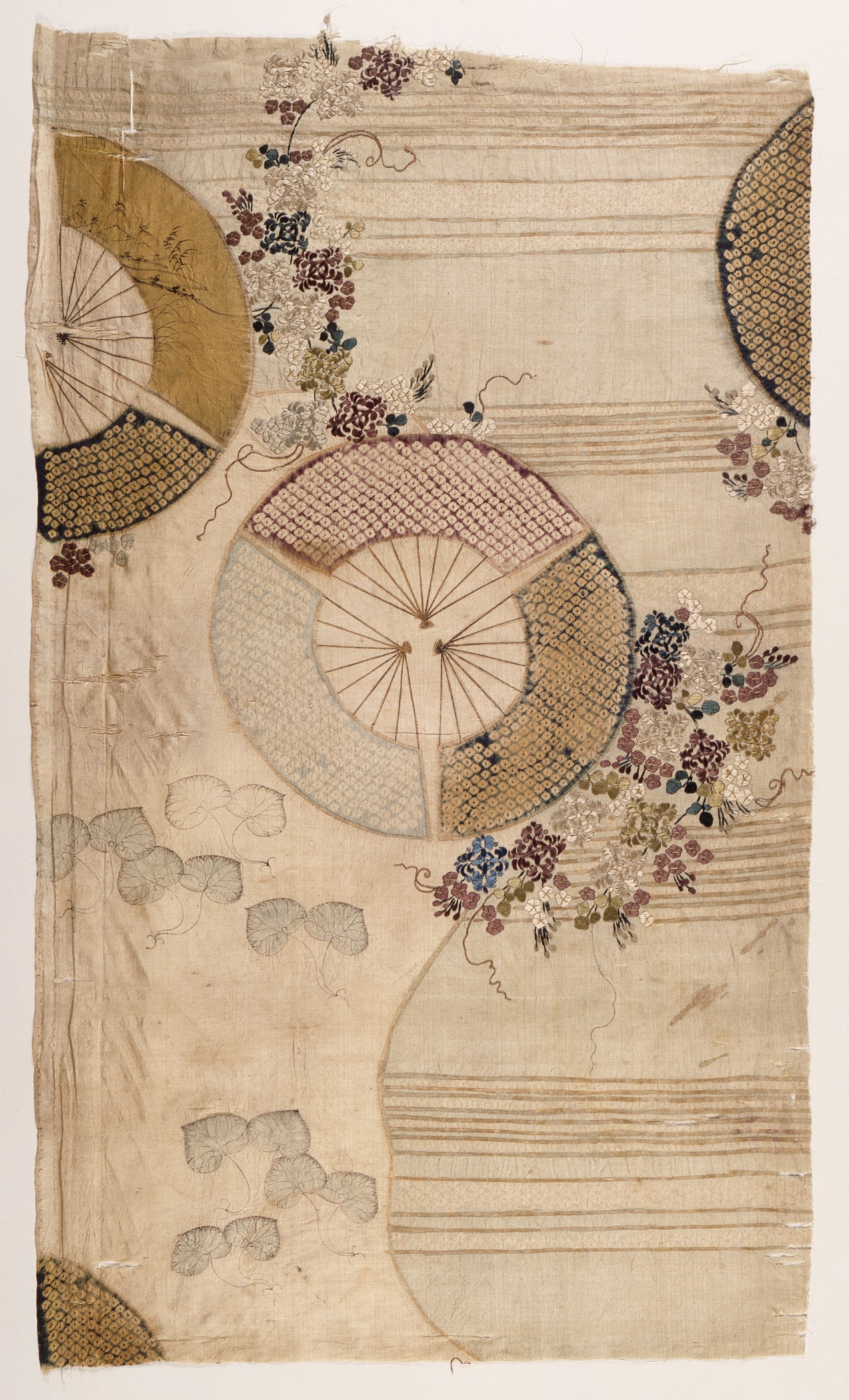
Fragment of a kosode decorated with fan roundels, flowering vines, and wild ginger leaves in the original tsujigahana style, Momoyama period (1568-1615)

Tsujigahana (辻ヶ花) is a Japanese fabric dyeing technique that originated in the Muromachi period.

== History ==
The name tsujigahana translates to "flowers at the crossroads". Documents from the Muromachi and Momoyama periods use the term to describe garments, but are unclear about whether the term refers to color, motifs, or dyeing methods. During the 20th century, scholars redefined tsujigahana to refer to a specific textile technique that uses stitch-resist dyeing (nuishime shibori) and ink painting to decorate a plain weave, lightweight fabric, often silk. The fabric is often further embellished using embroidery and gold leaf.

Historically, tsujigahana garments were worn by the Japanese upper class during the 16th century. After the death of a man, these garments would have been preserved as family heirlooms. However, for tsujigahana garments owned by women, these garments were often donated to Buddhist temples to pay for the memorial service. Temples deconstructed these garments into individual textile fragments and reconfigured them into temple decorations. During the 19th century, Buddhist temples lost the financial protection of the state, and many temples sold these decorations. They began to circulate on the antiques market, and were often deconstructed into the original fabric panels or fragments.

Tsujigahana is a variety of kimono created by the technique of shibori. The extravagant patterns were rather more picturesque and it was more eye-catching than other ordinary kinds of kimono. Tsujigahana technique is in a shroud of mystery as it is not clearly known who invented it or why it was called Tsujigahana. The technique lasted for two eras from Muromachi period to Edo period for about 300 to 400 years. It quickly became forgotten after the rise of Japanese handicrafts technique. But Tsujigahana nevertheless contributed a lot for the decorative art phase in Azuchi-Momoyama period.

== 20th century revival ==
The art style was revived by Itchiku Kubota (1917–2003). Although the exact methods for recreating tsujigahana were lost, in 1962, he was able to recreate the style using his own methods, called Itchiku Tsujigahana. His life's work was a series of eighty kimono, known as the Symphony of Light. The series of kimono comprise a panoramic depiction of the four seasons, the oceans, and the universe. Kubota died before completing the collection, and his son, Satoshi Kubota, is continuing the work. Itchiku founded the Itchiku Kubota Art Museum.
