= Marilyn Sokol =

American actress

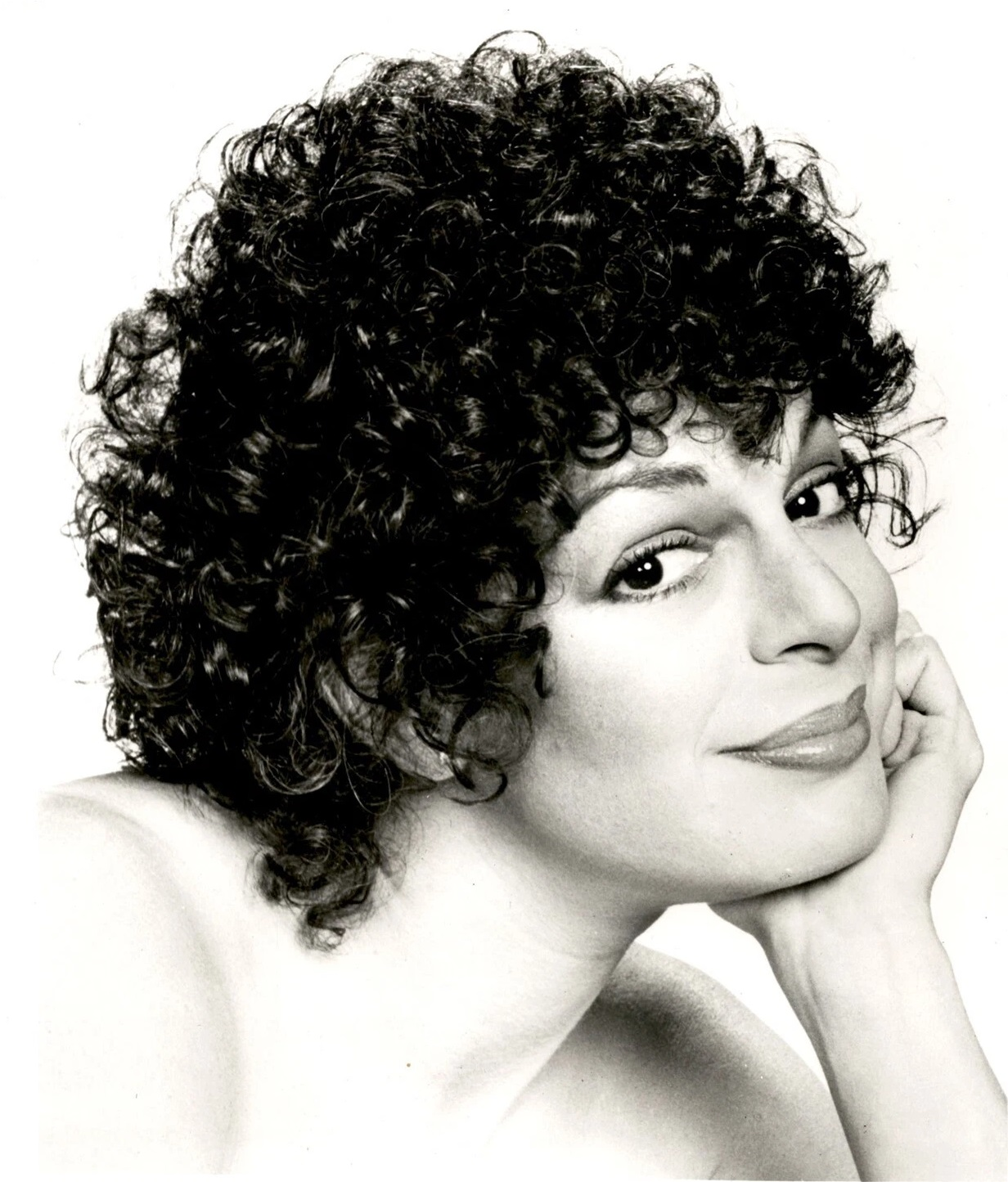
- Born: Marilyn Roberta Sokol; February 22, 1944 (age 82); Bronx, New York City, New York, U.S.
- Occupation: Actress
- Years active: 1966–present
- Awards: Obie Award, Bistro Award

Marilyn Roberta Sokol (born February 22, 1944) is an American actress, musician, comedian, and producer, perhaps best known for her roles as Lulu Brecht in Can't Stop the Music (1980) and as Ma Otter in Emmet Otter's Jug-Band Christmas (1977). She has received an Emmy Award, Obie Award, and a Bistro Award.

== Biography ==
She lives in New York City and has appeared in film, television as well as in theatre on Broadway, off-Broadway and regional theatres.

Sokol was born February 22, 1944, in the Bronx, New York City, and attended Calvin Coolidge High School in Washington, D.C., and New York University. She began her professional career in 1966 as a belly dancer in the national production of Man of La Mancha. She won an Obie Award for Distinguished Performance by an Actress in 1972 for her performance in a Chelsea Theater Center production of The Beggar's Opera. In 1977, she voiced Ma Otter in Emmet Otter's Jug-Band Christmas. In 1980, she was nominated for Worst Supporting Actress at the 1st Golden Raspberry Awards for her role in Can't Stop the Music. She has worked as a comedian, singer, and cabaret performer. In 2012-2013, she starred in the off-Broadway production Old Jews Telling Jokes. She has taught as a distinguished lecturer in the theatre program at Lehman College. She also portrayed Agnes Vertrulli on the web series Submissions Only in 2014.

== Filmography ==
=== Film ===
Year	Title	Role	Notes
1971	The Hospital	Lady Lib.	Uncredited
1976	The Front	Sandy	
1977	The Goodbye Girl	Linda	
1978	Foul Play	Stella	
1979	Something Short of Paradise	Ruthie Miller	
1980	The Last Married Couple in America	Alice Squib	
1980	Can't Stop the Music	Lulu Brecht	
1988	Crocodile Dundee II	Doris	
1989	Family Business	Marie	
1994	Men Lie	Porno Witness	
1995	The Basketball Diaries	Chanting Woman	
1999	Man on the Moon	Madame	
2002	Big Apple	Ms. Callahan	
2005	The Producers	Bag Lady	
2008	Lucky Days	Cherie	
2011	Musical Chairs	Mrs. Greenbaum	
2011	Wounded Warrior	Grandma Grace	Short
2015	Unplugging Aunt Vera	Aunt Vera	Short
2015	Sam	Mrs. Goldfarb	
2019	Almost Love	Peggy	

=== Television ===
Year	Title	Role	Notes
1972-1992	Sesame Street	Various Muppets	Recurring role
1977	Emmet Otter's Jug-Band Christmas	Ma Otter	Voice, TV movie
1977	Barney Miller	Dr. Lorraine Dooley	"Sex Surrogate"
1977	All That Glitters	Farrah Abuban	
1980	Scalpels	Dr. Betty Hacker	TV movie
1982	Sesame Street	Camp Director Aunt May	On camera appearance, 5 episodes
1986	Joe Bash	Betty	"Joe's First Partner"
1991	Law & Order	Marilee Katz	"His Hour Upon the Stage"
1996	Law & Order	Mrs. Levine	"Encore"
1996	All My Children		
1999	Sex and the City	Dr. Velma Rubin	"The Awful Truth"
2000	Between the Lions	The Strange Old Woman	"Sausage Nose"
2011	Are We There Yet?	Old Woman	"The Salsa Episode"
2014	Submissions Only	Agnes Vetrulli	Main role
2015	Difficult People	Older Woman	"Pilot"

== Notable theater productions ==
- Year Boston Won the Pennant (1969)
- The Great God Brown, Cybel, Dec. 10, 1972 - Jan. 13, 1973
- Don Juan, Matherine, Dec. 11, 1972 - Jan. 13, 1973
- Elephant Steps (1974) (in the role of Ragtime Lady, her performance of "Watch Me Put My Right Foot Through the Door" has been captured on the cast album)
- Welcome to the Club, Arlene Metzler, Apr. 13 - 22, 1989
- Guilt Without Sex (one woman show, 1991)
- Conversations with My Father, Hannah de Blinde, Mar. 22, 1992 - Mar. 14, 1993
- Shlemiel the First (1994-1997)
- Angel Levine (1995)
- Sam and Itkeh (1997)
- If Memory Serves (1999)
- Closet Chronicles (2003)
- In the Wings (2005)
- Old Jews Telling Jokes (2012)

Preceded by None	Performer of Betty Lou; 1974 - 1975	Succeeded by Fran Brill
