= Mary C. Henderson =

American playwright and filmmaker (1928–2012)

- Born: Mary Carmen Malanga; July 16, 1928; Newark, New Jersey, U.S.
- Died: January 3, 2012 (aged 83); Congers, New York, U.S.
- Occupation: Historian
- Spouse: Robert M. Henderson (m. 1953, divorced)
- Children: 3
- Awards: Guggenheim Fellowship (1983)

Academic background
- Education: Douglass College; University of Pittsburgh; New York University

Academic work
- Discipline: History of theater
- Institutions: Adelphi University; American University; William Paterson College; Montclair State College; Museum of the City of New York; New York University

Mary Carmen Henderson (née Malanga; July 16, 1928 – January 3, 2012) was an American historian of theater. A 1983 Guggenheim Fellow, she was author of The City and the Theatre (1973) and Theater in America (1986), among other works. She served as the curator of the Museum of the City of New York's Theater Collection from 1978 until 1985.

== Biography ==
=== Early life and career ===
Henderson was born Mary Carmen Malanga on July 16, 1928, in Newark, New Jersey, the youngest of five children of Divina (née Gianattasio) and Thomas Malanga. She grew up in a single-mother household and was raised in Elizabeth, New Jersey, where she attended Battin High School. She obtained a BA from Douglass College in 1949 and her MA in speech and theater from the University of Pittsburgh in 1951.

Originally interested in acting after going to Broadway during her youth, she worked as a costumer at Adelphi University (in addition to her speech and theater instructor positions) and American University. She obtained her PhD in theater history, dramatic criticism and literature from New York University in 1972.

=== Academic career ===
She taught as a speech and theater instructor at William Paterson College from 1966 to 1972, before working at Montclair State College as an assistant professor of speech and theatre from 1973 to 1974. She served as the Museum of the City of New York's Theater Collection curator from 1978 to 1985, during which she made their first catalogue and promoted their patrons' activities. She founded The Theatre Museum in Shubert Alley, serving as director. She also served as an adjunct professor at the New York University Department of Performance Studies.

In 1973, she published her first book, The City and the Theatre, which "tracked the history of every important playhouse in New York history". In 1983, she was awarded a Guggenheim Fellowship "for a view of American theatre through its collaborators". She won the Theatre Library Association's 1987 George Freedley Memorial Award for her book Theater in America (1986), which later became popular in theater courses. and was called her "most important work" by Bruce Weber of The New York Times. She also wrote Broadway Ballyhoo (1989), The New Amsterdam (1997), the Jo Mielziner biography Meilziner: Master of Modern Stage Design (2000/2001), Stars on Stage (2005), and The Story of 42nd Street (2008, co-authored with Alexis Greene). She was editor for the fourth to sixth volumes of Performing Arts Resources.

Mel Gussow of The New York Times said that Henderson had "the curiosity of a bibliophile as well as the enthusiasm of one who loves the stage", and that her work "reflect[ed] her familiarity with and love of theater imagery and theater artifacts". Robert Simonson of Playbill called her "a leading historian of the American theatre",

She was a member of the Tony Awards Nominating Committee from 1980 until 1992. She was a contributor to such publications as The New York Times, at one point criticizing Neil Simon for the excessive use of dinner tables. She also won a Broadway Theatre Institute Award for Excellence in Theater Education and two United States Institute for Theatre Technology Golden Pens, as well as distinguished alumna status with Douglass College.

=== Personal life and death ===
In 1953, she married Robert M. Henderson, a historian who served as head of the New York Public Library for the Performing Arts. She had three sons. She and Robert divorced.

Henderson died from Parkinson's disease on January 3, 2012, at her home, aged 83. At the time, she lived in Congers, New York.

== Bibliography ==
- The City and the Theatre (1973)
- Theater in America (1986)
- Broadway Ballyhoo (1989)
- The New Amsterdam (1997)
- Meilziner: Master of Modern Stage Design (2000/2001)
- Stars on Stage (2005)
- The Story of 42nd Street (2008)
