= Bonnie Comley =

American actress

Bonnie Comley is an American three-time Tony Award-winning theatre producer. She has won an Olivier Award and two Drama Desk Awards for her stage productions. She is a member of The Broadway League and serves on their Audience Engagement and Education Committee.

== Career ==
After graduating from Emerson College, Comley was hired as a reporter, and on-camera host for NightLife Tv on The Travel Channel. Comley began pursuing an acting career in the 1990s, appearing in commercials for Budweiser, Crystal Light and Pizza Hut.

In 2013, Bonnie Comley co-founded BroadwayHD.

== Charitable work ==
Comley has created scholarships funds at Columbia University Business Graduate School and at the Boston University College of Fine Arts Undergraduate School, where a theater is named in her honor. She is also major supporter of the University of Massachusetts Lowell, where another theater is named in her honor, and at Emerson College where the Musical Theater Society Room bears her name. She is also a supporter of Fiorello H. La Guardia High School for the Performing Arts School with her husband Stewart F. Lane.

On May 7, 2007, the 500 seat Comley/Lane Theater opened at the University of Massachusetts Lowell.

== Personal life ==
Comley is married to fellow producer Stewart F. Lane and they live in NYC.

== Notable productions ==
=== As producer ===
- The Minutes (scheduled opening March 15, 2021)
- The Lightning Thief (Oct 16, 2019 - Jan 05, 2020)
- Sunset Boulevard (Feb 09, 2017 - Jun 25, 2017)
- China Doll (December 4, 2015 to January 31, 2016)
- On Your Feet! (November 5, 2015 to August 20, 2017)
- Sylvia (Octobter 27, 2015 to January 3, 2016)
- A Gentleman's Guide to Love and Murder (November 17, 2013 – Present)
- Romeo and Juliet (September 19, 2013 - December 8, 2013)
- Jekyll & Hyde (April 18, 2013 - May 12, 2013)
- A Streetcar Named Desire (April 22, 2012 - June 22, 2012)
- Gore Vidal's The Best Man (April 1, 2012 - September 9, 2012)
- War Horse (April 14, 2011 – January 6, 2013)
- Priscilla Queen of the Desert (March 20, 2011 – June 24, 2012)
- The Merchant of Venice (November 13, 2010 – February 20, 2011)
- Bloody Bloody Andrew Jackson (October 13, 2010 – January 2, 2011)
- Come Fly Away (March 25, 2010 – September 5, 2010)
- Enron (April 27, 2010 - May 9, 2010)
- The 39 Steps (March 25, 2010 – January 16, 2011)
- All About Me (March 18, 2010 - April 4, 2010)
- Superior Donuts (October 1, 2009 - January 3, 2010)
- American Buffalo (Nov 17, 2008 - Nov 24, 2008)
- Sunday in the Park with George (February 21, 2008 - June 29, 2008)
- The 39 Steps (January 15, 2008 – January 10, 2010)
- Cyrano de Bergerac (November 1, 2007 - January 6, 2008)
- Legally Blonde: The Musical (April 29, 2007 – October 19, 2008)
- Jay Johnson: The Two and Only (September 28, 2006 - November 26, 2006)
- In the Wings (September 26, 2005 - October 16, 2005)
- Fiddler on the Roof (February 26, 2004 - January 8, 2006)
- Gypsy (May 1, 2003 - May 30, 2004) Produced by WWLC (WAxman, Williams, Lane, Comley)
- Jay Johnson: The Two and Only (May 13, 2004 - August 15, 2004) Produced in Association with Bonnie Comley
- Mouse (2026)

=== As actor ===
- If It Was Easy (March 7, 2001 - April 2, 2001)
- Fortune's Fools (May 9, 1995 - July 1, 1995)
- Dreamtime (1992)
- Noo Yawk Tawk (1988–1991)
- Accentuate the Positive
- Da Show Must Go On
- Delay on the A Train
- Final Appeal
- I Did It
- Lobby Hero
- Lost and Found
- Superman Blues
- The Golden Age
- Trial By Fire
- Who's Hot, Who's Not

== Boards and associations ==
- The Drama League Board of Directors ( 2009–present)
- Emerson College Board of Advisors (2003–present)
- Diller-Quaile School of Music Board of Directors (2002-2011)
- The Theatre Museum Board of Advisors (2002–present)
