= Romeo and Juliet (2013 Broadway play) =

- Poster of the 2013 Broadway theatre production
- Directed by: Don Roy King
- Written by: William Shakespeare
- Produced by: Ellen M. Krass
- Starring: Orlando Bloom; Condola Rashad
- Edited by: Rob Burgos
- Music by: David Van Tieghem
- Distributed by: BroadwayHD; Fathom Events
- Release dates: February 13, 2014 (US); April 1, 2014 (UK)
- Running time: 135 minutes
- Country: United States
- Language: English

Romeo and Juliet is a filmed performance of the 2013 Broadway theatrical production of William Shakespeare's Romeo and Juliet starring Orlando Bloom and Condola Rashad which was produced as a 2014 film by BroadwayHD and Fathom Events.

== Summary ==
Classic retelling of Romeo and Juliet storyline with Shakespeare play dialogue. However the play is set in modern-day with Romeo arriving on stage riding a motorcycle in blue jeans and sunglasses. The Montague family is all white and the Capulet family all black adding a new dimension of racial conflict between the two families. Balcony scene remains unchanged and the ending is still a tragedy that unites the families.

== Cast ==
- Orlando Bloom – Romeo
- Condola Rashad – Juliet
- Brent Carver – Friar Laurence
- Jayne Houdyshell – Nurse
- Donté Bonner – Sampson
- Christian Camargo – Mercutio
- Joe Carroll – Balthasar
- Chuck Cooper – Lord Capulet
- Corey Hawkins – Tybalt
- Geoffrey Owens - Prince Escalus

== Production background ==
It was the first Broadway production of the play Romeo and Juliet since 1977. The play ran on Broadway at Richard Rodgers Theatre from September 19 to December 8, 2013, for 93 regular performances after 27 previews starting on August 24 with Orlando Bloom and Condola Rashad in the starring roles. On November 27, two performances of the production were filmed with nine cameras in high definition, and these performances were scheduled to be released in 2000 theatres on February 13 for the Valentine's Day week in 2014 in the United States. The United Kingdom theatrical release date was April 1.

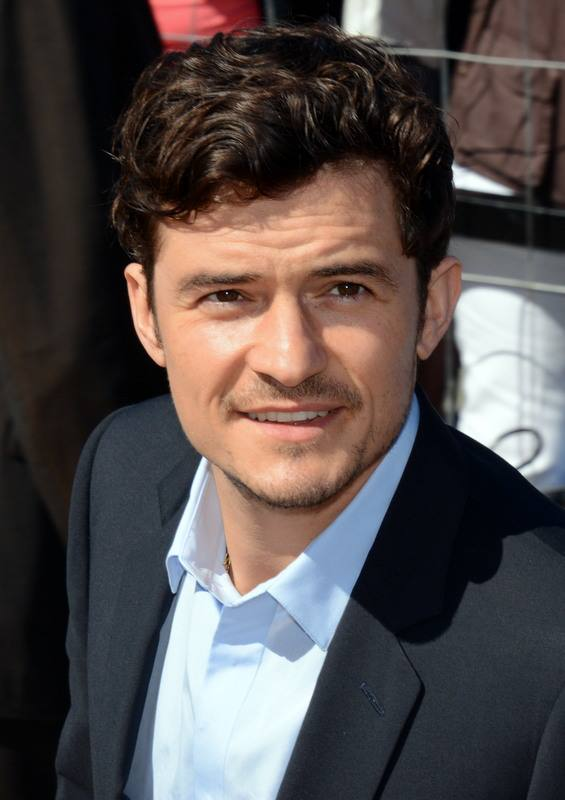
Orlando Bloom starred as Romeo.

This production depicts Romeo and his Montague family with white actors, while Juliet and her Capulet family are depicted with black actors. The production was a modernization featuring a Triumph motorcycle and zip-up jackets. The show marked Bloom's Broadway debut, and although Rashad had earned Tony Award nominations for both of her two prior Broadway roles, it was the first professional Shakespeare production for both stars. Therefore, the actors hired Patsy Rodenburg of Guildhall School of Music and Drama as a Shakespearean voice instructor.

== Critical response ==
The play was met with modest reviews. Broadwayworld.com critic, Michael Dale, viewed the work as "lacking" in many respects. Despite the fact that Director David Leveaux uses a grand entrance for star Bloom on a motorcycle, the show is mostly "stale" according to Terry Teachout of The Wall Street Journal. The Hollywood Reporter's David Rooney described the production as "snoozy". Nonetheless, the film received a fresh rating from 5 out of 6 reviewers at Rotten Tomatoes.
