= BroadwayHD =

Digital streaming media company

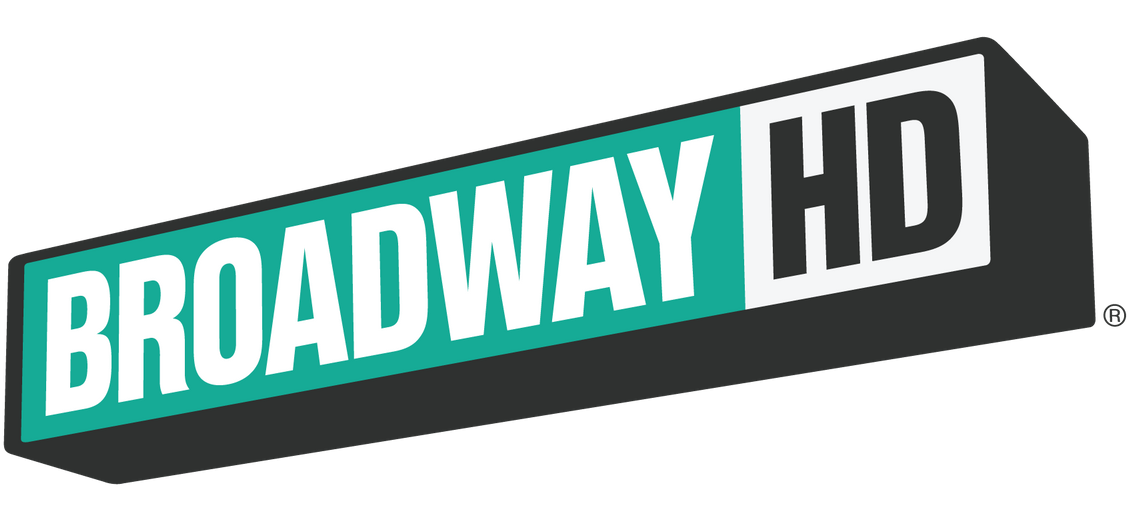
- Type: Private
- Industry: Entertainment
- Headquarters: New York City
- Products: Streaming media, video on demand, live stream productions
- Number of employees: 20
- Website: broadwayhd.com

BroadwayHD is an on-demand digital streaming media company. Based in New York City, the company records and distributes live theater performances and previously recorded theatrical productions through its platform.

== History ==
Stewart F. Lane and Bonnie Comley, Tony Award-winning producers, wanted to democratize the niche market of Broadway by filming live productions and making them available to a wider audience through the internet. As long standing members of the community, they formed agreements with all 17 unions, guilds and associations behind Broadway shows so that show creators are compensated for filming. BroadwayHD has partnered with leading theatre companies such as Roundabout Theatre Company, The Public Theater, Manhattan Theatre Club, The Geffen and Lincoln Center for the Performing Arts. BroadwayHD's website, which featured on demand streaming, launched in fall 2015 with 100 titles from Broadway and London's West End.

=== She Loves Me livestream ===
In June 2016, BroadwayHD produced a live stream of the Roundabout Theater Company's production of She Loves Me from Studio 54. The production earned BroadwayHD a Guinness World Record for the first live stream of a Broadway show.

=== Tony Awards Backstage Broadcast ===
In 2016 BroadwayHD produced the first extra behind-the-scenes video content streamed show during the CBS telecast of the awards, live from the Beacon Theatre.

== Productions ==
In addition to its livestream of She Loves Me, the company has also produced livestreams of The Geffen Playhouse's Long Day's Journey into Night starring Jane Kaczmarek and Alfred Molina, Irving Berlin's Holiday Inn, starring Bryce Pinkham and Corbin Bleu, and Ernest Shackleton Loves Me.

BroadwayHD has also produced Present Laughter with Kevin Kline, Paula Vogel's Indecent, John Patrick Shanley's The Portuguese Kid with Jason Alexander, and Drew Droege's Bold Colors, Bright Patterns directed by Michael Urie.

== Digital on-demand library ==
As of April 2018, BroadwayHD's library includes over 200 titles including Hugh Jackman in Oklahoma! and Ian McKellen as King Lear. BroadwayHD features content other than plays, such as coverage of the American Theatre Wing's Centennial Gala, concerts and theater documentaries.

== See also ==
- National Theatre Live
- Metropolitan Opera Live in HD
- Royal National Theatre
- List of Royal National Theatre Company actors
- Theater in the United States
- Theatre of the United Kingdom
