= John W. Barfield =

American businessman (1927–2018)

John W. Barfield (February 8 1927 – January 2, 2018) in Tuscaloosa, Alabama) was an African American businessman who served in the U.S. Army in France and Germany immediately after World War II. On his return, Barfield began working as a custodian for the University of Michigan and started his first business in 1955, called the Barfield Cleaning Company of Ypsilanti, Michigan, which employed 200 people. Barfield later founded a $2B staffing business with 2,600 employees, which was named “Company of the Year” by the Black Enterprise magazine in 1985. Barfield is a recipient of the George Romney Award recognizing lifelong achievement in volunteerism.

The Bartech Group, which was founded by Barfield, is a workforce management and staff provider, headquartered in Livonia, Michigan, United States, with international operations in Mississauga, Ontario, Canada and the United Kingdom.

Barfield died of natural causes in his home in Ann Arbor on January 2, 2018.

== Personal life ==
Barfield and his wife had six children and resided in Ann Arbor, Michigan.
