= Stewart F. Lane =

Broadway producer, director, playwright and former actor

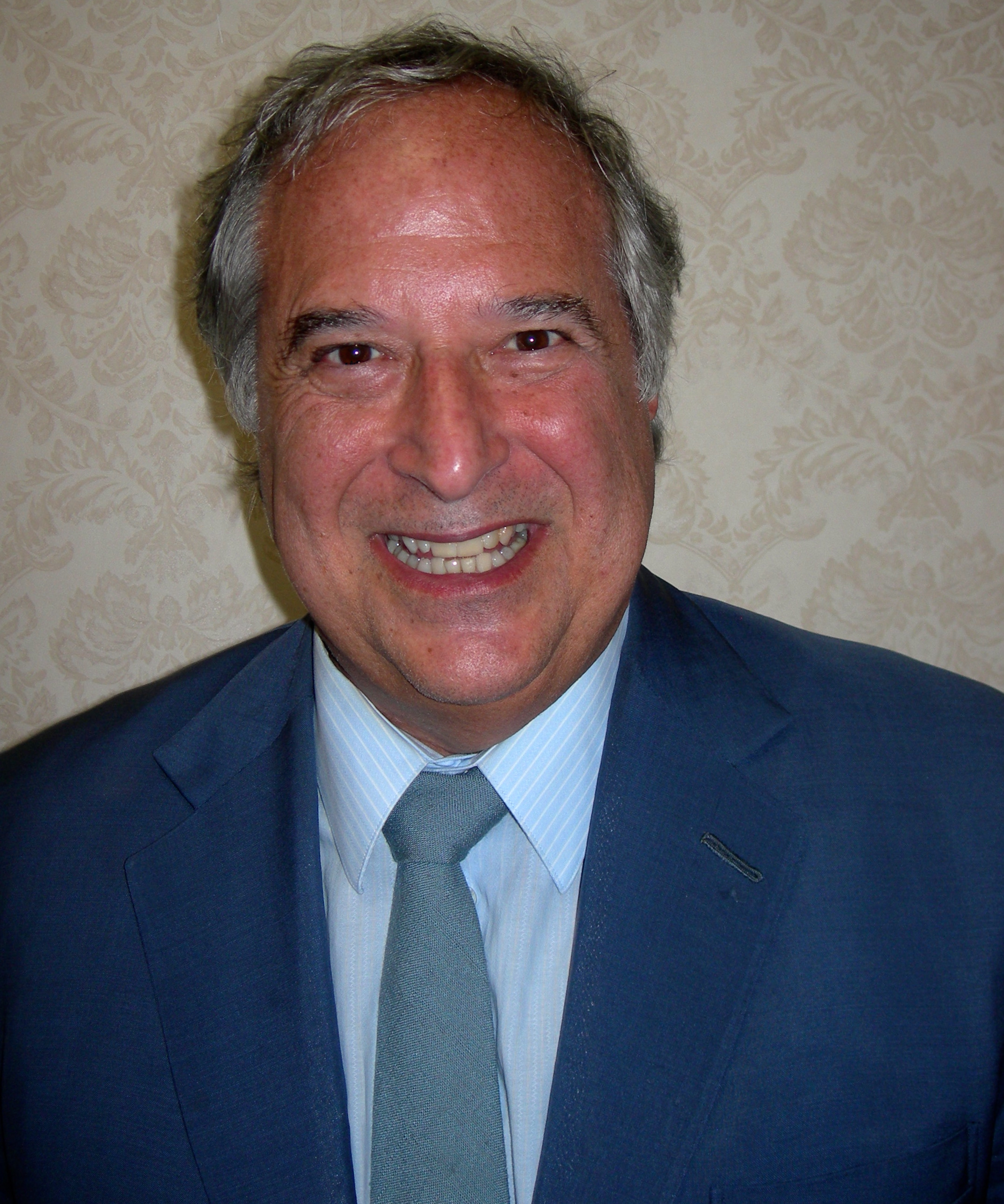
- Stewart F. Lane
- Born: May 3, 1951 (age 75)
- Occupations: Theatrical producer, Theatre owner
- Website: www.mrbroadway.com

Stewart F. Lane (born May 3, 1951) is a Broadway producer, director, playwright and former actor. He has also written books, including Let's Put on a Show! and Jews of Broadway. He has also produced in Dublin. In addition to publishing two plays, he has directed across the country, working with Stephen Baldwin, Shannen Doherty, Chazz Palminteri, and more. He is co-owner of the Palace Theatre (Broadway) with the Nederlander Organization and a partner in the Tribeca Grill with Robert De Niro, Sean Penn and Mikhail Baryshnikov. He has written three books: Let's Put on a Show!, Jews on Broadway: An Historical Survey of Performers, Playwrights, Composers, Lyricists and Producers, and Black Broadway: African Americans on the Great White Way.

== Early life ==
Lane was born in New York, the son of Leonard Charles Lane (a corporate executive) and Mildred Chesanow Lane. He has an older sister and a younger brother. Lane was raised in Great Neck, New York, and graduated from Great Neck North High School in 1969. Lane was friends with the son of actor Sid Caesar. Lane decided to pursue a career in theatre after seeing a performance of Neil Simon's Little Me starring Caesar. Lane attended C. W. Post College for one year before transferring to Boston University College of Fine Arts where he graduated with a Bachelor of Fine Arts degree in Acting in 1973.

== BroadwayHD ==
In 2015, Lane and his wife, Bonnie Comley, launched BroadwayHD. BroadwayHD is a subscription-based streaming service for stage performances with a mission to promote and preserve live theatre, extending the reach of Broadway and Broadway-caliber shows to anyone, anywhere. With a growing catalog of over 300 full-length productions, each show is filmed with high definition cameras that capture the excitement of a Broadway performance and deliver the best angles, video quality, and sound quality to users.

=== Theatre ===
In 1974, Lane earned his Actors Equity card performing in The Little Theater on the Square in Sullivan, Illinois, playing in Oklahoma! starring Peter Palmer. He later toured in summer stock with Van Johnson in Send Me No Flowers (1975). In 1976, Lane worked at the Piedmont Repertory Company starring in Picnic, The Philadelphia Story and The Odd Couple. In spring 1977, Lane co-starred with Ed Herlihy in Never Too Late at the Fox Hollow Dinner theater in Jericho, New York. Later that year, he joined the Screen Actors Guild and AFTRA unions and moved to California and wrote the first draft of his play In the Wings. Returning to New York City in 1978 he worked as assistant house manager at the Brooks Atkinson Theatre during the run of Same Time, Next Year by Bernard Slade. Lane also worked at the theater during Tribute starring Jack Lemmon and later at the Alvin Theatre during the run of Annie. His first billing as "Assistant to the Producer" was for Whose Life Is It Anyway? starring Tom Conti.

Off-Broadway and regionally, Lane produced: Jay Johnson: The Two and Only, Fortune's Fools, Sarah Abraham by Pulitzer Prize-winning playwright Marsha Norman, Eating Raoul – The Musical, Hitchcock's The 39 Steps and The Apprenticeship of Duddy Kravitz composed by Allen Menken.

In London, Lane produced Thoroughly Modern Millie (Olivier Nomination), Ragtime (Olivier Nomination and Lobby Hero. In Dublin, he produced the world premiere of JFK: A Musical Drama

Expanding into film, Lane produced the documentary Show Business: the Road to Broadway and Brooklyn Rules starring Alec Baldwin and Freddy Prinze Jr. Lane produced the Broadway production of Company starring Raul Ezparza, Cyrano de Bergerac for Great Performances on PBS.

Lane previously sat on the board of directors of Rogar Studios and currently is on the board of trustees of The Actor's Fund of America. Lane sat on the board of governors of the Broadway League for eleven years and still remains a member of the League. He is on the board of advisors for the American Theater Wing and previously The Times Square Group. Lane is the chairman of the board of directors of the Theatre Museum.

Lane has created scholarship funds at Columbia University Business Graduate School, and Boston University College of Fine Arts Undergraduate School, (B.F.A) as well as major support to the University of Massachusetts, Emerson College and Fiorello H. La Guardia High School for the Performing Arts.

=== Authorship ===
Lane wrote Let's Put on a Show, a guide to theatre production, in 2007. In 2011 he wrote Jews on Broadway: An Historical Survey of Performers, Playwrights, Composers, Lyricists and Producers which talks about Jewish performance from immigrants and Yiddish productions on the Lower East Side to their impact on Broadway. He has also written the plays In the Wings (published in spring 2008 by Hal Leonard), If It Was Easy (published by Performing Books and nominated for Best New Play by the American Theatre Critics Association), and the musical A Moment in Time (musical)|A Moment in Time (with music and lyrics by John Denver). He has directed extensively with productions of A Moment in Time (at the Dix Hill Performing Arts Center in Huntington New York), The Foreigner, The Gig, Ain't Misbehavin', If It Was Easy, The Golden Age, Frankenstein, Final Appeal with Chaz Palminteri and Stephen Baldwin, and In the Wings with Shannen Doherty.

Black Broadway: African Americans on the Great White Way, Lane's third book, was released in 2015. The book is a comprehensive discussion of African American's contribution to theatre.

=== Other activities ===
Representing former Mayor Rudolph Giuliani, Lane served on the Board of Directors at the New York State Theater at Lincoln Center and the Transitional Committee where appointed both the Commissioner for Cultural Affairs and the Commissioner of Film, Theater & Broadcasting.

Lane serves on the board of trustees at Boston University and the board of advisers in the College of Fine Arts. He co-chairs the CFA Campaign for Boston University as well as the Dean's Advisory Board. In 2002, Lane was awarded Boston University's Distinguished Alumni Award.

Lane is also the recipient of the Ellis Island Medal of Honor, and the Jewish National Fund Tree of Life Award.

In 2013, Lane co-founded BroadwayHD with his wife, Bonnie Comley. In 2014, Lane and Comley produced an HD broadcast of Romeo and Juliet starring Orlando Bloom, which was screened in over 2,000 movie theaters. The theater streaming platform officially launched in 2015. In 2016, BroadwayHD and its founders, Lane and Comley, broke the Guinness World Record for the first Broadway show to be live streamed. Roundabout Theatre Company's production She Loves Me was streamed on June 30, 2016, on BroadwayHD.

Currently, Lane is president and chief executive officer of Stellar Productions International and Stewart F. Lane Productions. He is the co-owner and operator of the Palace Theatre in New York City, and partnered in the Tribeca Grill Restaurant with Robert De Niro.

== Personal life ==
Lane is married to fellow producer Bonnie Comley and they live in NYC with their five children.

== Awards ==
Tony Awards:

- 1991 Best Musical – The Will Rogers Follies
- 1984 Best Musical – La Cage aux Folles
- 2002 Best Musical – Thoroughly Modern Millie
- 2006 Best Theatrical Event – Jay Johnson: The Two and Only
- 2011 Best Play – War Horse
- 2014 Best Musical – A Gentleman's Guide to Love and Murder

Olivier Awards:

- 2013 Best Musical – Top Hat

== Filmography ==
- Puppet on a Chain (1970) as George Lemay
- Curtain Time (1994) (producer)
- I Want To Be a Hilton (1 episode 2005) as Charity Auction Patron
- ShowBusiness: The Road to Broadway (2007) (producer)
- Brooklyn Rules (2007) (producer)
- Great Performances (TV Series) (3 episodes, 2007–2010) (producer)
- A Nanny for Christmas (2010) (actor, producer) as Mike Edelstein
- American Bandits: Frank and Jesse James (2010) (producer)
- Company (2011) (producer)
- The Dog Who Saved Halloween (2011) (producer)
- A Christmas Wedding Tail (2011) (producer)
- Stolen Child (2012) (producer)
- Wyatt Earp's Revenge (2012) (producer)
- A Christmas Wedding Date (2012) (producer)
- The Dog Who Saved the Holidays (2012) (actor, producer) as Mr. Edelstein
- Summoned (2013) (producer)
- Romeo and Juliet (2014) (producer)
- The Drama League: 100 Years and Counting (2014) (producer)
- Christmas in Palm Springs (2014) (producer)
- Lady Day at Emerson's Bar & Grill (2015) (producer)
- Mouse (2026) (producer)

== Notable stage productions ==
- The Minutes (March 15, 2020 – July 24, 2022)
- The Lightning Thief (October 16, 2019 – January 5, 2020)
- China Doll (December 4, 2015 – January 31, 2016)
- On Your Feet! (November 5, 2015 – August 20, 2017)
- Sylvia (October 27, 2015 - January 3, 2016)
- A Gentleman's Guide to Love and Murder (November 17, 2013 – January 17, 2016)
- Romeo and Juliet (September 19, 2013 – December 8, 2013)
- Jekyll & Hyde (April 5, 2013 – May 11, 2013)
- Top Hat (April 19, 2013 – October 26, 2013)
- A Streetcar Named Desire (April 22, 2012 – June 22, 2012)
- Gore Vidal's The Best Man (April 1, 2012 – September 9, 2012)
- War Horse (April 14, 2011 – 2012)
- Priscilla Queen of the Desert (March 20, 2011 – June 24, 2012)
- The Merchant of Venice starring Al Pacino and Lily Rabe (November 13, 2010 – February 20, 2011)
- Bloody Bloody Andrew Jackson (October 13, 2010 – January 2, 2011)
- Come Fly Away (March 25, 2010 – September 5, 2010)
- Enron (April 27, 2010 – May 9, 2010)
- All About Me (March 18, 2010 – April 4, 2010)
- The 39 Steps (March 25, 2010 – January 16, 2011)
- Superior Donuts (October 1, 2009 – January 3, 2010)
- Sunday in the Park with George (February 21, 2008 – June 29, 2008)
- American Buffalo starring Cedric the Entertainer, John Leguizamo, and Haley Joel Osment (February 16, 2007 – April 12, 2007)
- The 39 Steps (January 15, 2008 – January 10, 2010)
- Cyrano de Bergerac starring Kevin Kline, Jennifer Garner, and Daniel Sunjata (November 1, 2007 – January 6, 2008)
- Legally Blonde: The Musical (April 29, 2007 – October 19, 2008)
- Jay Johnson: The Two and Only (September 28, 2006 – November 26, 2006)
- Fiddler on the Roof (revival) starring Alfred Molina (February 26, 2004 – January 8, 2006)
- Gypsy (revival) starring Bernadette Peters (May 1, 2003 – May 30, 2004)
- Thoroughly Modern Millie (April 18, 2002 – June 20, 2004)
- Minnelli on Minnelli starring Liza Minnelli (December 8, 1999 – January 2, 2000)
- Wait Until Dark starring Quentin Tarantino and Marisa Tomei (April 5, 1998 – June 28, 1998)
- 1776 (revival) starring Pat Hingle and Brent Spiner (August 14, 1997 – June 14, 1998)
- Candles, Snow & Mistletoe (December 26, 1993 – December 30, 1993)
- The Goodbye Girl starring Martin Short and Bernadette Peters (March 4, 1993 – August 15, 1993)
- The Will Rogers Follies (May 1, 1991 – September 5, 1993)
- A Change in the Heir (April 29, 1990 – May 13, 1990)
- La Cage aux Folles (August 21, 1983 – November 15, 1987)
- Teaneck Tanzi: The Venus Flytrap starring Deborah Harry and Andy Kaufman (April 20, 1983 – April 20, 1983)
- Can-Can starring Zizi Jeanmaire (April 30, 1981 – May 3, 1981)
- Woman of the Year starring Lauren Bacall (March 29, 1981 – March 13, 1983)
- Frankenstein starring Dianne Wiest (January 4, 1981)
- West Side Story starring Debbie Allen (February 14, 1980 – November 30, 1980)
- Lone Star & Pvt. Wars (June 7, 1979 – August 5, 1979)
- The Grand Tour starring Joel Grey (January 11, 1979 – March 4, 1979)

== Awards and nominations ==
- 2014 Tony Award for Best Musical (A Gentleman's Guide to Love and Murder, winner)
- 2014 Drama Desk Award for Outstanding Musical (A Gentleman's Guide to Love and Murder, winner)
- 2013 Laurence Olivier Award for Best New Musical (Top Hat, winner)
- 2012 Tony Award for Best Play (The Best Man, nominee)
- 2011 Tony Award for Best Play (War Horse, winner)
- 2011 Tony Award for Best Revival of a Musical (The Merchant of Venice, nominee)
- 2008 Tony Award for Best Revival of a Musical (Sunday in the Park with George, nominee)
- 2008 Tony Award for Best Play (The 39 Steps, nominee)
- 2008 Drama Desk Award for Outstanding Revival of a Musical (Sunday in the Park with George, nominee)
- 2008 Drama Desk Award for Unique Theatrical Experience (The 39 Steps, winner)
- 2007 Drama Desk Award for Outstanding Musical (Legally Blonde: The Musical, nominee)
- 2006 Tony Award for Best Theatrical Event (Jay Johnson: The Two and Only, winner)
- 2005 Lucille Lortel Award for Jay Johnson's The Two and Only, (nominee)
- 2004 Tony Award for Best Revival of a Musical (Fiddler on the Roof, nominee)
- 2004 Drama Desk Award for Outstanding Revival of a Musical (Fiddler on the Roof, nominee)
- 2003 Tony Award for Best Revival of a Musical (Gypsy, nominee)
- 2003 Drama Desk Award Outstanding Revival of a Musical (Gypsy, nominee)
- 2003 Laurence Olivier Award for Best New Musical (Ragtime, nominee)
- 2003 Laurence Olivier Award for Best New Musical (Thoroughly Modern Millie, nominee)
- 2002 Tony Award for Best Musical (Thoroughly Modern Millie, winner)
- 2002 Drama Desk Award for Outstanding New Musical (Thoroughly Modern Millie, winner)
- 2000 American Theatre Hall of Fame & The American Theatre Critics Association Best New Play for "If It Was Easy..."
- 2002 Laurence Olivier Award Best New Comedy (Lobby Hero, nominee)
- 1998 Tony Award for Best Revival of a Musical (1776, nominee)
- 1993 Tony Award for Best Musical (The Goodbye Girl, nominee)
- 1991 Tony Award for Best Musical (The Will Rogers Follies, winner)
- 1991 Drama Desk Award for Outstanding Musical (The Will Rogers Follies, winner)
- 1991 New York Drama Critics' Circle Award for The Will Rogers Follies
- 1991 Western Heritage Award from the National Cowboy & Western Heritage Hall of Fame for The Will Rogers Follies)
- 1984 Tony Award for Best Musical (La Cage aux Folles, winner)
- 1984 Drama Desk Award for Outstanding Musical (La Cage aux Folles, nominee)
- 1983 Drama-Logue Award for Best New Play Teaneck Tanzi
- 1983 Outer Critics Circle Award for La Cage aux Folles
- 1981 Tony Award for Best Musical (Woman of the Year, nominee)

=== Published articles ===
- Lane-Comley Studio on BostonTheatreScene.com
- American Bandits: Frank and Jesse James Move Trailer on MoviesTrailer.org
- World Premiere of A Moment in Time on Hamptons.com
- Legend Stewart Lane's A Moment in Time, Times Square Gossip
- World Premier of A Moment in Time, Black Tie International Magazine
- A Moment in Time Article from The Queens Courier
- A Moment in Time Review from The Queens Courier
- A Moment in Time World Premiere on LI, northshoreoflongisland.com
- 2010 Theatre Museum Awards on CharityHappenings.org
- 2010 Theatre Museum Awards on Hamptons.com
- 2010 Theatre Museum Awards on Broadwayworld.com
- 2010 Theatre Museum Awards, Black Tie International Magazine
- The 76th Annual Drama League Awards Ceremony and Luncheon, Black Tie International Magazine
- 2010 Drama League Awards Nominations, Black Tie International Magazine
- 2010 Drama League Awards Nominations on CharityHappenings.org
- 2010 Actors Fund Gala, Black Tie International Magazine
- All About Me Opens on Broadway, Black Tie International Magazine
- 2010 Drama League Gala, Hampton Sheet Magazine
- 2010 Drama League Benefit on Broadway.com
- 2010 Drama League Benefit on Broadway World
- 2010 Drama League Benefit on Theatremania
- 2010 Drama League Benefit on Playbill
- 2010 Drama League Benefit on Playbill Photos
- Superior Donuts outing
- Broadway Salutes, Arts Horizons Gala, Black Tie International Magazine
- The Broadway Salutes Arts Horizons, BroadwayWorld.com
- The Actors Fund Special Campaign Benefit, BroadwayWorld.com
- Paul Newman Award For Services To The Arts And Children To Be Awarded To Local Residents, Hamptons.com
- Stewart F. Lane & Bonnie Comley will receive the Paul Newman Award for Services to the Arts and Children, Black Tie International Magazine
- Stewart F. Lane's DVD signing with the Drama League
- Film and Stage Duo, Hampton Sheet
- Stewart F. Lane and Bonnie Comley Interview TheaterLife
- Who's Here, Dan's Papers
- Actors Fund Gala Honors Baldwin, Fleming, Lane and Comley, Playbill News
- The Tag Team of Broadway Theatre: Stewart Lane and Bonnie Comley
- Theater Producers Change Their Stage When Twins Arrive, New York's The Sun
- Stewart F. Lane's book signing Let's Put on a Show!, Broadway World
