= Lake Kawaguchi =

Lake in Yamanashi prefecture, Japan

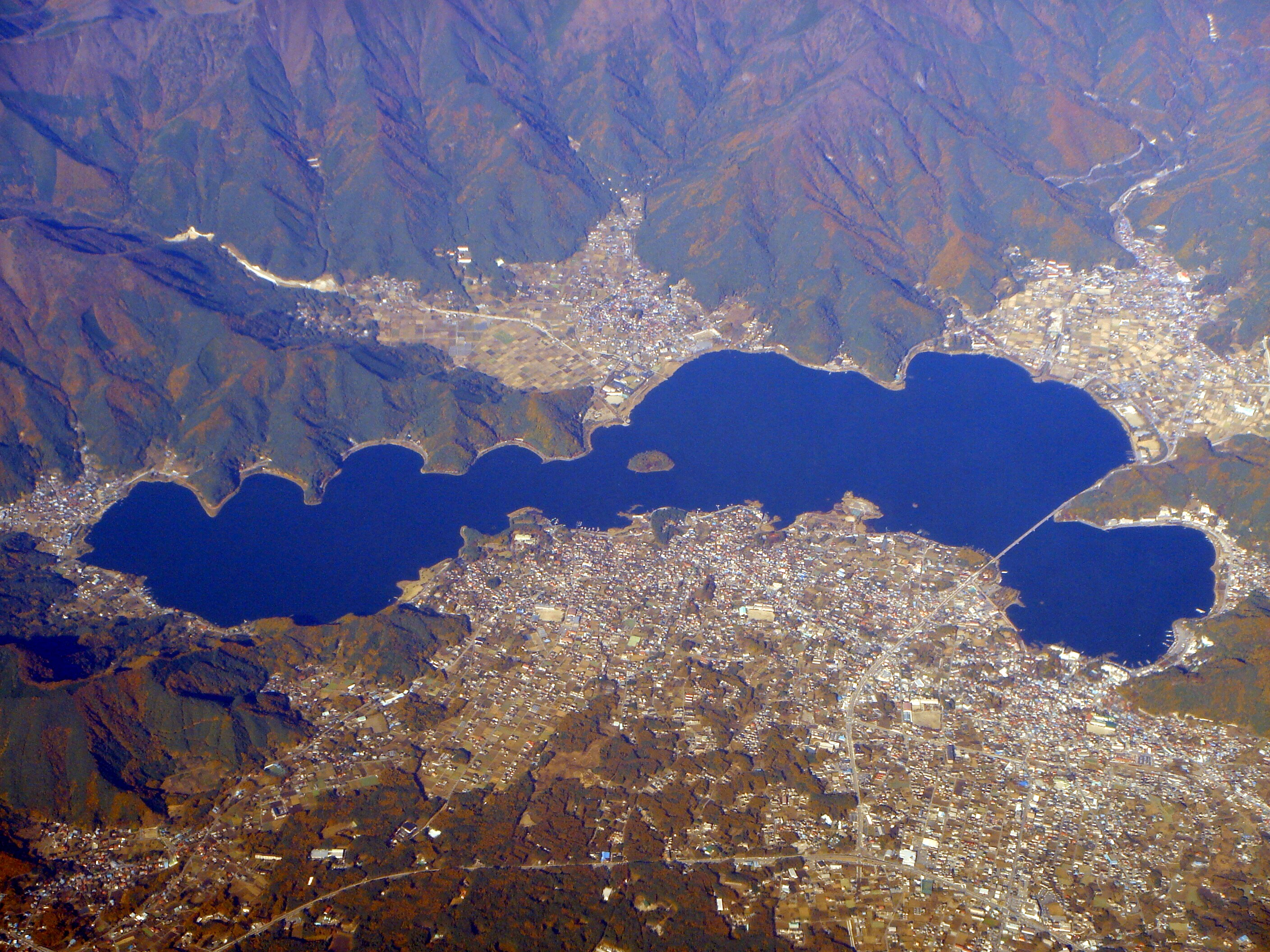

- Location within Japan
- Location: Yamanashi Prefecture
- Coordinates: 35°30′54″N 138°45′24″E
- Primary inflows: none
- Basin countries: Japan
- Surface area: 6.13 km^{2} (2.37 sq mi)
- Max. depth: 15.2 m (50 ft)
- Shore length^{1}: 19.08 km (11.86 mi)
- Surface elevation: 833 m (2,733 ft)
- ^{1} Shore length is not a well-defined measure.

Lake Kawaguchi (河口湖, Kawaguchi-ko (Note: Japanese pronunciation: [ka.waꜜ.ɡɯ.tɕi̥ꜜ.ko, -ŋɯ.tɕi̥ꜜ.ko, -ɡɯꜜ.tɕi̥.ko, -ŋɯꜜ.tɕi̥.ko]) (Note: lit. 'River Mouth Lake')) is located in the town of Fujikawaguchiko in southern Yamanashi Prefecture near Mount Fuji, Japan. It is the second largest of the Fuji Five Lakes in terms of surface area, and is located at the lowest elevation. It is situated at an altitude of approximately 800 metres (2,625 ft), which accounts for its relatively cool summers and frequently icy winters. It also has the longest shoreline of any of the Fuji Five Lakes.

The lake is within the borders of the Fuji-Hakone-Izu National Park.

The lake has no natural outlet, and flooding of settlements on its shores was a problem until the construction of a canal, completed in 1914, to connect it to a tributary of the Sagami River.

As with the other Fuji Five Lakes, the area is a popular resort, with many lakeside hotels, windsurfing facilities, camp sites, and excursion boats. Japanese white crucian carp and wakasagi were introduced to the lake in the Meiji period, and sports fishing is also popular. Lake Kawaguchi is the most popular of the Fuji Five Lakes in terms of tourists, and has the most developed tourist infrastructure. The area also serves as a major hub for those wishing to climb Mount Fuji during the climbing season (July and August), and is also popular with photographers due to the panoramic views of the mountain from the shore.

In 2013 the lake was added to the World Heritage List as part of the Fujisan Cultural Site.

One of the best ways to visit the lake from Tokyo is the JR operated Limited Express Fuji Excursion. The train runs up to three times daily from Shinjuku Station. The area is also served by frequent motorway coach services from various locations in Tokyo, including Shinjuku Expressway Bus Terminal, Tokyo Station, Shibuya Mark City, etc. Most of these services are operated by Fuji Kyuko.

== Climate ==
Climate data for Kawaguchiko (1991–2020 normals, extremes 1933–present)
Month	Jan	Feb	Mar	Apr	May	Jun	Jul	Aug	Sep	Oct	Nov	Dec	Year
Record high °C (°F)	19.5 (67.1)	22.1 (71.8)	23.7 (74.7)	29.9 (85.8)	30.5 (86.9)	34.0 (93.2)	35.3 (95.5)	35.0 (95.0)	33.5 (92.3)	29.7 (85.5)	24.1 (75.4)	21.2 (70.2)	35.3 (95.5)
Mean daily maximum °C (°F)	5.5 (41.9)	6.6 (43.9)	10.5 (50.9)	16.1 (61.0)	20.6 (69.1)	23.0 (73.4)	27.2 (81.0)	28.1 (82.6)	23.8 (74.8)	18.3 (64.9)	13.8 (56.8)	8.5 (47.3)	16.8 (62.2)
Daily mean °C (°F)	−0.4 (31.3)	0.6 (33.1)	4.2 (39.6)	9.5 (49.1)	14.3 (57.7)	17.8 (64.0)	21.9 (71.4)	22.5 (72.5)	18.7 (65.7)	13.0 (55.4)	7.5 (45.5)	2.3 (36.1)	11.0 (51.8)
Mean daily minimum °C (°F)	−5.7 (21.7)	−4.8 (23.4)	−1.3 (29.7)	3.7 (38.7)	8.9 (48.0)	13.7 (56.7)	18.0 (64.4)	18.5 (65.3)	14.8 (58.6)	8.7 (47.7)	2.2 (36.0)	−2.9 (26.8)	6.1 (43.0)
Record low °C (°F)	−22.1 (−7.8)	−20.5 (−4.9)	−18.1 (−0.6)	−9.1 (15.6)	−3.0 (26.6)	3.5 (38.3)	4.2 (39.6)	9.3 (48.7)	2.3 (36.1)	−3.3 (26.1)	−9.5 (14.9)	−15.5 (4.1)	−22.1 (−7.8)
Average precipitation mm (inches)	60.9 (2.40)	55.4 (2.18)	107.6 (4.24)	106.1 (4.18)	123.2 (4.85)	157.1 (6.19)	178.4 (7.02)	176.8 (6.96)	264.7 (10.42)	230.0 (9.06)	76.0 (2.99)	49.8 (1.96)	1,585.9 (62.44)
Average snowfall cm (inches)	37 (15)	28 (11)	20 (7.9)	4 (1.6)	0 (0)	0 (0)	0 (0)	0 (0)	0 (0)	0 (0)	1 (0.4)	7 (2.8)	97 (38)
Average precipitation days (≥ 0.5 mm)	5.8	6.1	10.4	9.9	10.8	13.3	13.3	11.3	12.4	11.4	7.8	5.3	117.8
Average snowy days	8.8	9.9	9.4	2.3	0.0	0.0	0.0	0.0	0.0	0.0	0.6	5.1	36.7
Average relative humidity (%)	62	63	67	68	73	80	81	81	82	81	74	66	73
Mean monthly sunshine hours	212.3	190.7	185.7	185.5	181.0	122.8	148.4	165.2	122.5	134.4	165.8	199.9	2,014.2
Source: Japan Meteorological Agency (normals: 1991–2020, extremes: 1933–present)

== Gallery ==
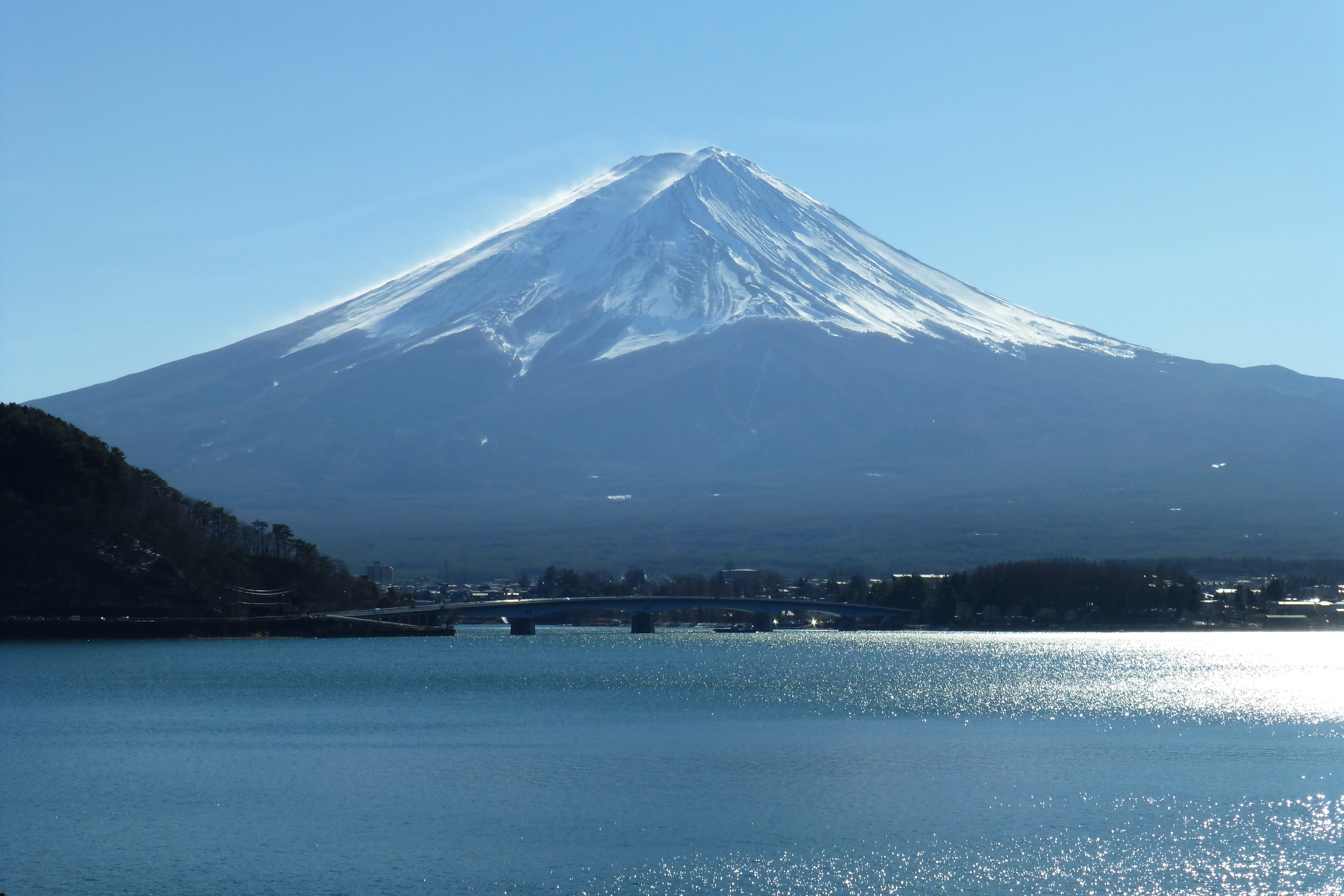
Mount Fuji and Lake Kawaguchi

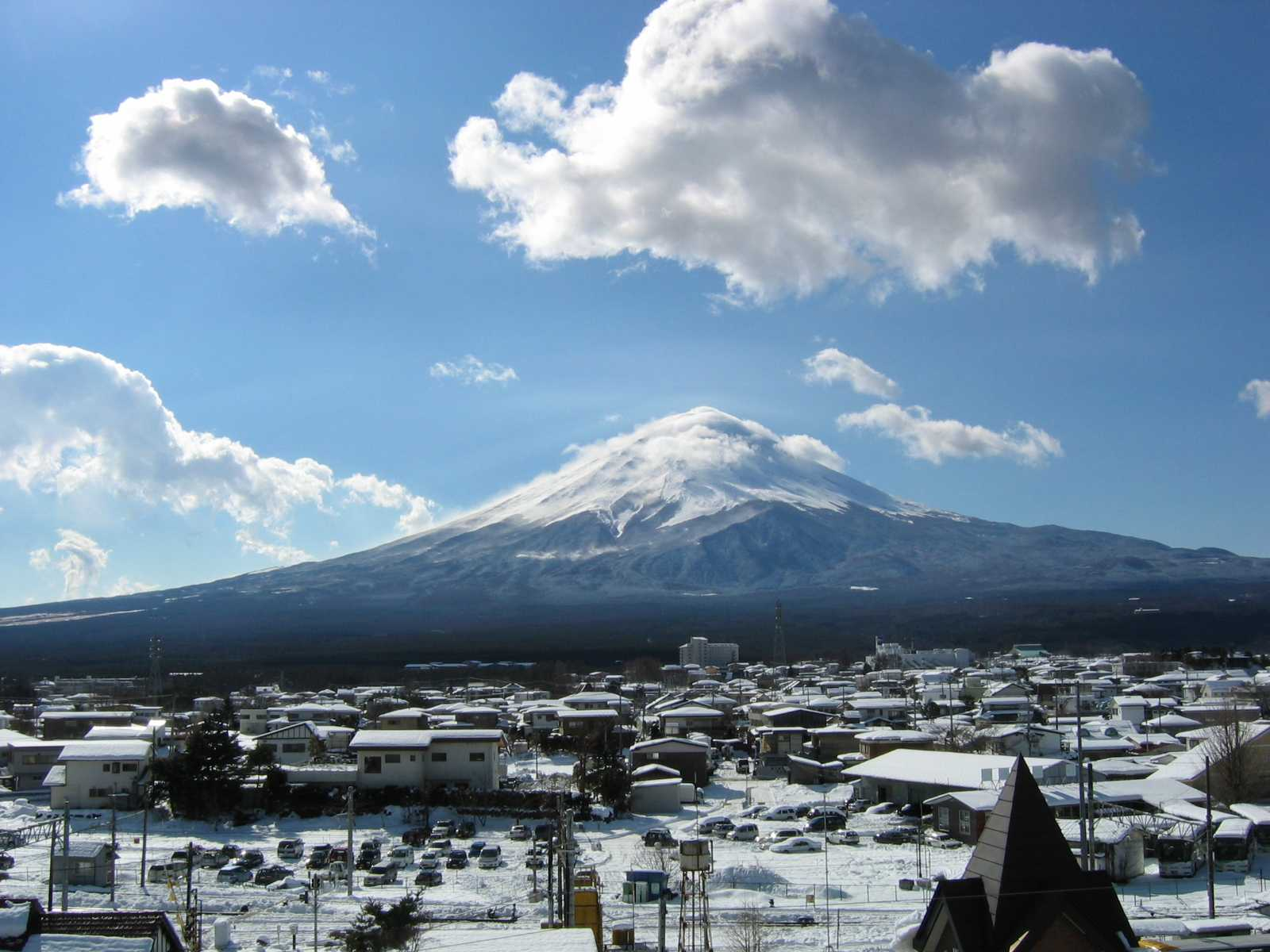
Mount Fuji and Kawaguchiko Station

Eastern part

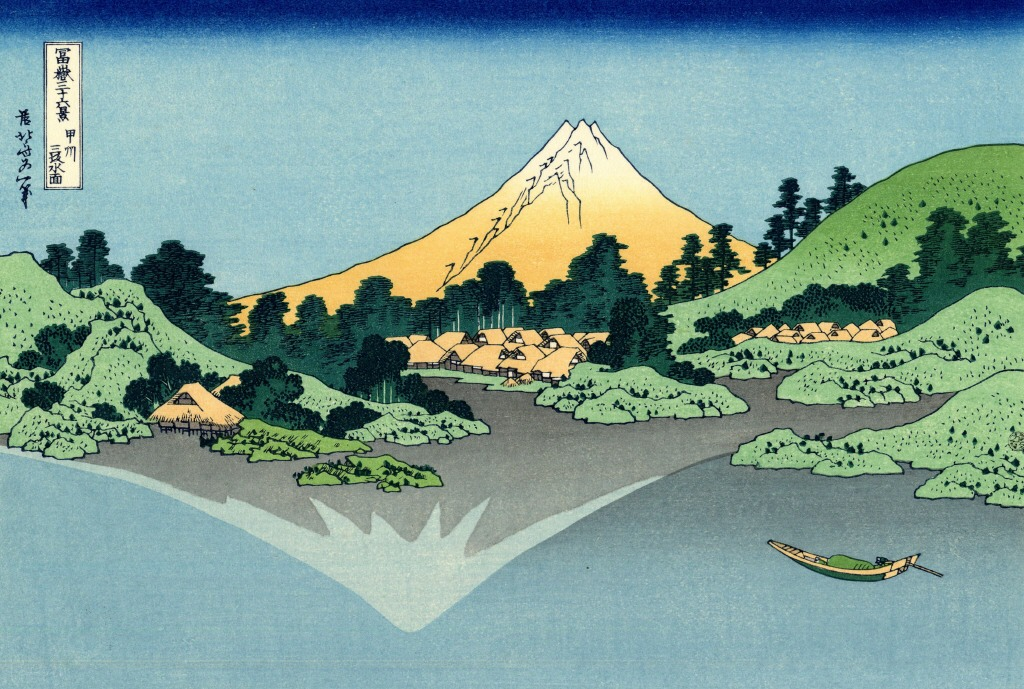
Hokusai

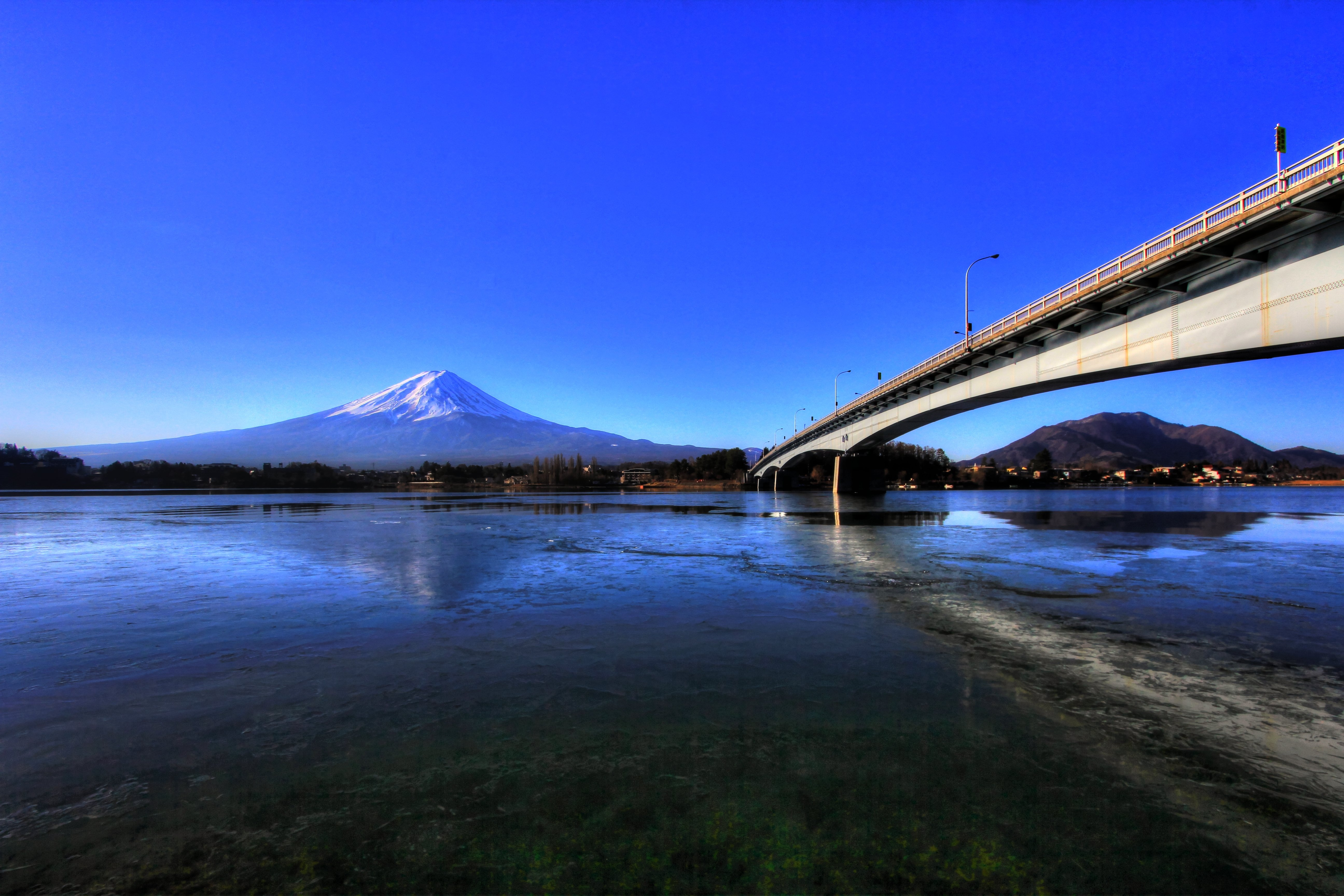
Kawaguchiko Bridge

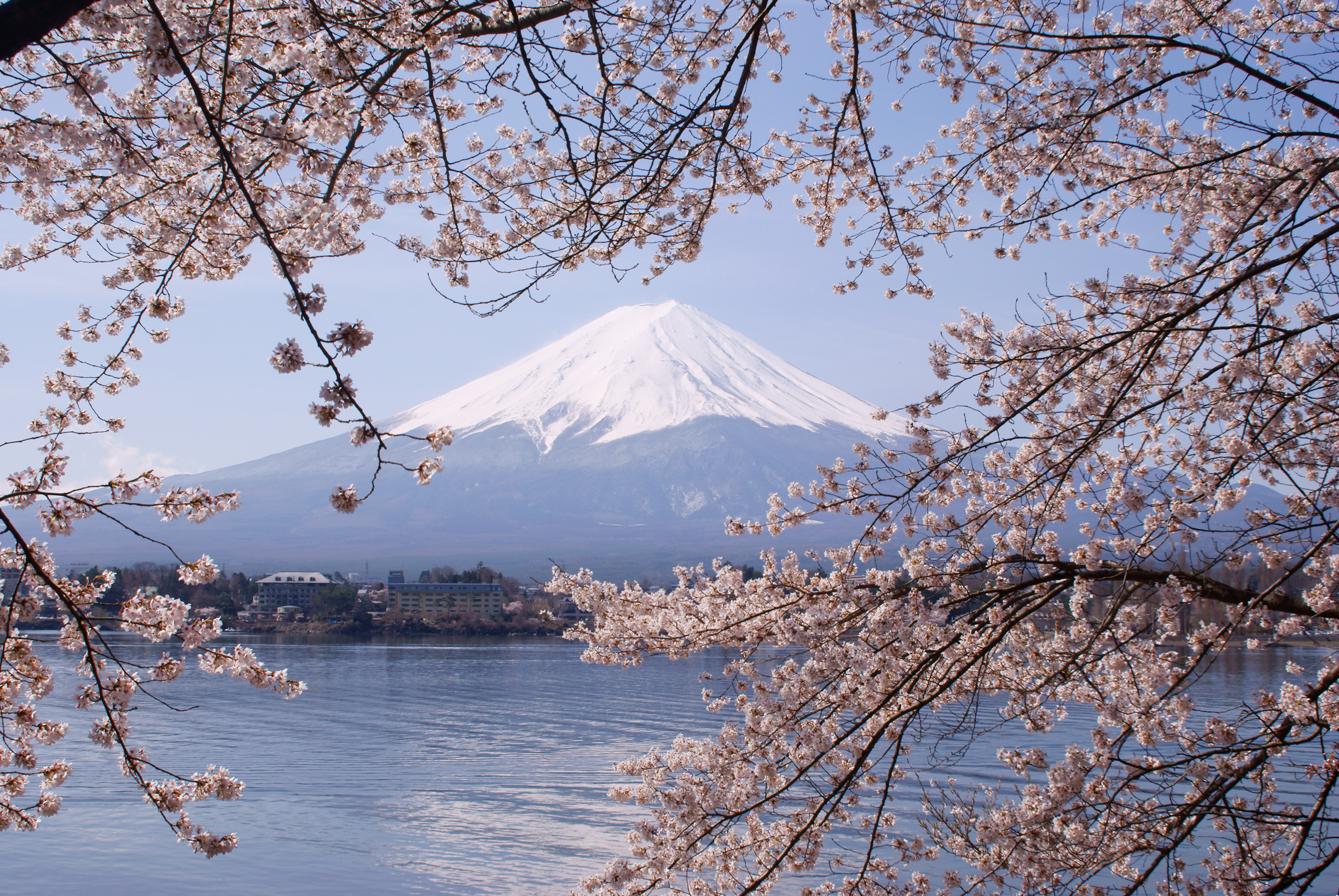
Cherry blossoms

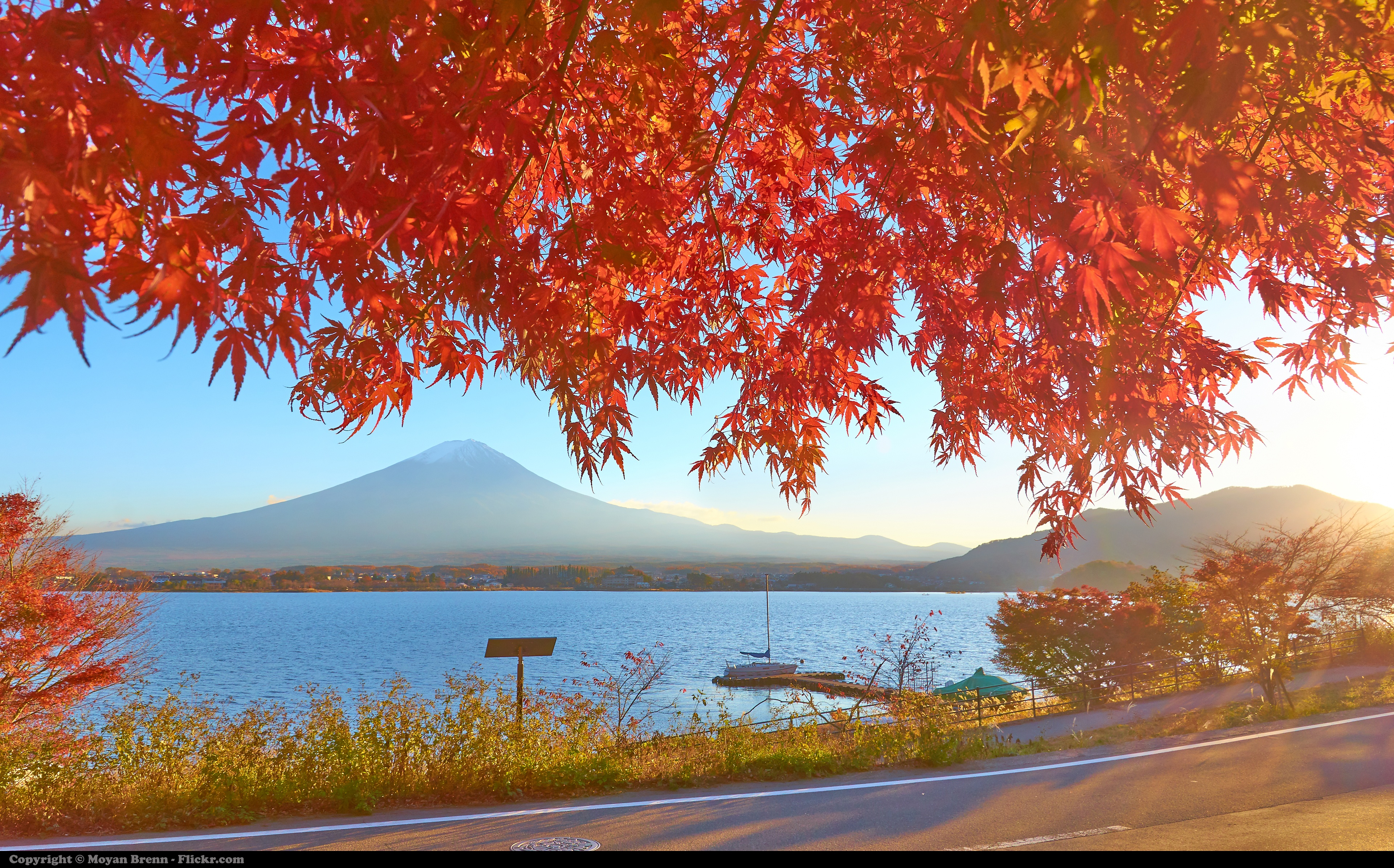
Autumn

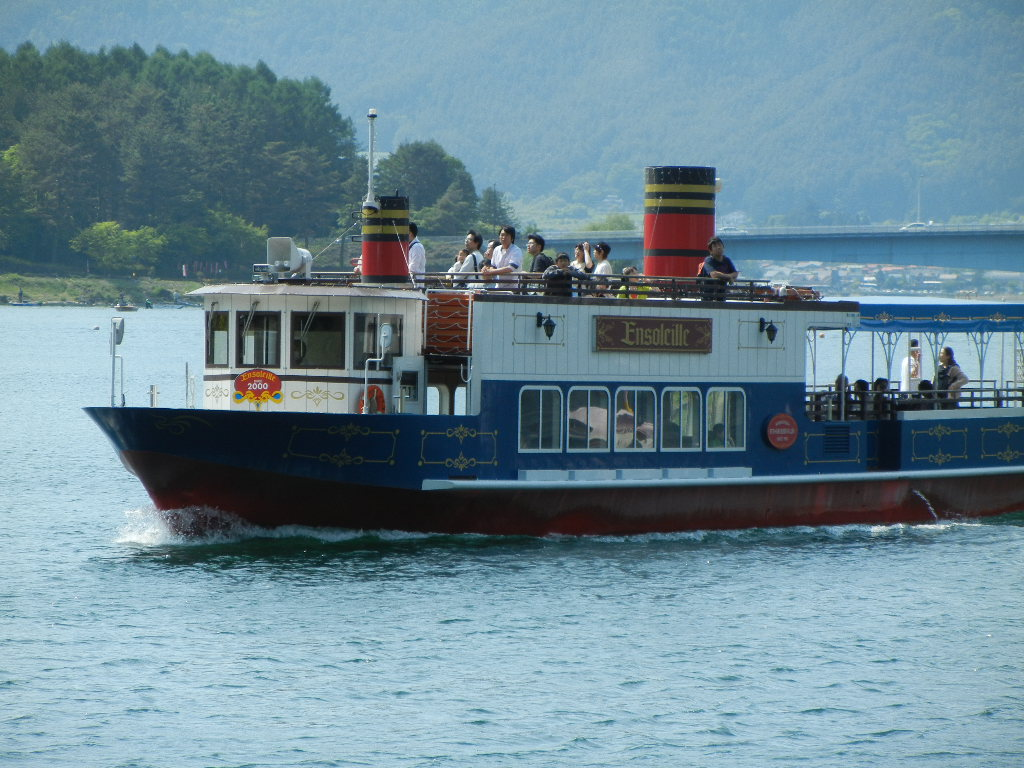
Ensoleille ship

== See also ==
- Fuji Five Lakes
- Fuji-Hakone-Izu National Park
- Tenjō-Yama Park Mt. Kachi Kachi Ropeway
