= Mount Ōmuro =

Mount Ōmuro (藻岩山, Ōmuroyama) may refer to the following mountains in Japan.

- Mount Ōmuro (Mount Fuji), mountain at the foot of Mount Fuji
- Mount Ōmuro (Shizuoka), mountain in Izu-Tobu
- Mount Ōmuro (Tanzawa), mountain in the Tanzawa Mountains
