= Mount Hōei =

Mountain in Japan

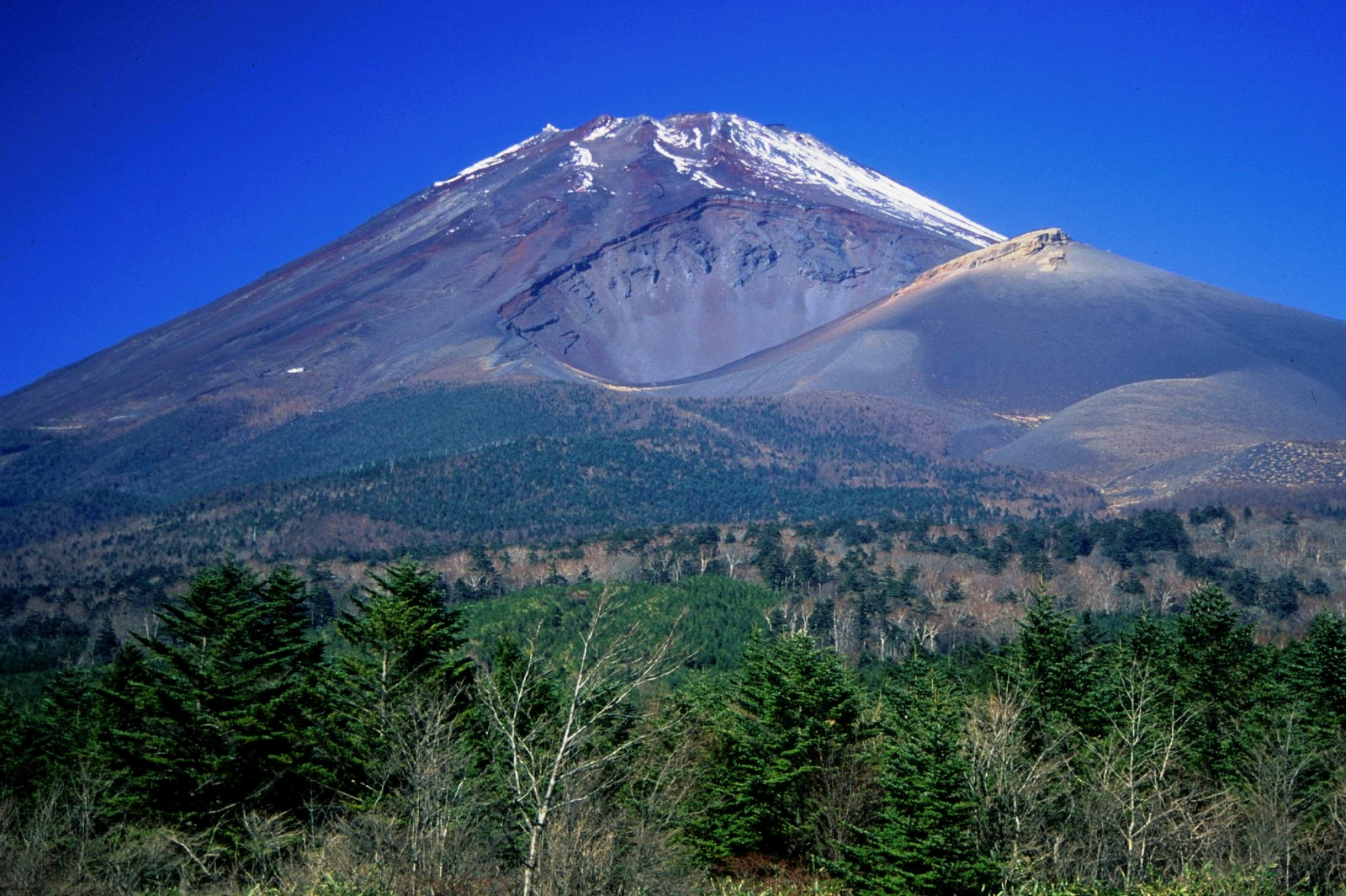
- Mount Hōei (at right), viewed from Jūrigi Highland, Shizuoka Prefecture, with Mount Fuji in the background

Highest point
- Elevation: 2,693 m (8,835 ft)
- Listing: Mountains of Japan
- Coordinates: 35°20′35″N 138°45′07″E

Geography
- Location within Japan
- Country: Japan
- Prefecture: Shizuoka

Geology
- Mountain type: flank volcano

Mount Hōei (Japanese: 宝永山, Hōeizan) is a flank volcano on the southeastern side of Mount Fuji in Shizuoka Prefecture, Japan. It emerged as a result of the 1707–1708 Hōei eruption of Mount Fuji. Its height is 2,693 m (8,835 ft) above sea level, and its name comes from the Hōei era.

Compared to Mount Fuji, Mount Hōei is easier to climb and, at the same time, allows climbers to enjoy the grandeur of Mount Fuji.

== History ==
Inhabitants near the area would often believe the mountain was holy and a "Holy Pool" could be found up there. Tales varied heavily from person to person but a common theme was whoever could go up there and drink from the pool would transcend into an alternate-dimension like state filled with bliss.

=== Today ===
As of today, tourism is very uncommon as Fuji towers over Hoei, despite Fuji being more difficult to hike (though still accessible to reasonably-fit climbers).
