= Mount Fuji =

Volcano in Japan

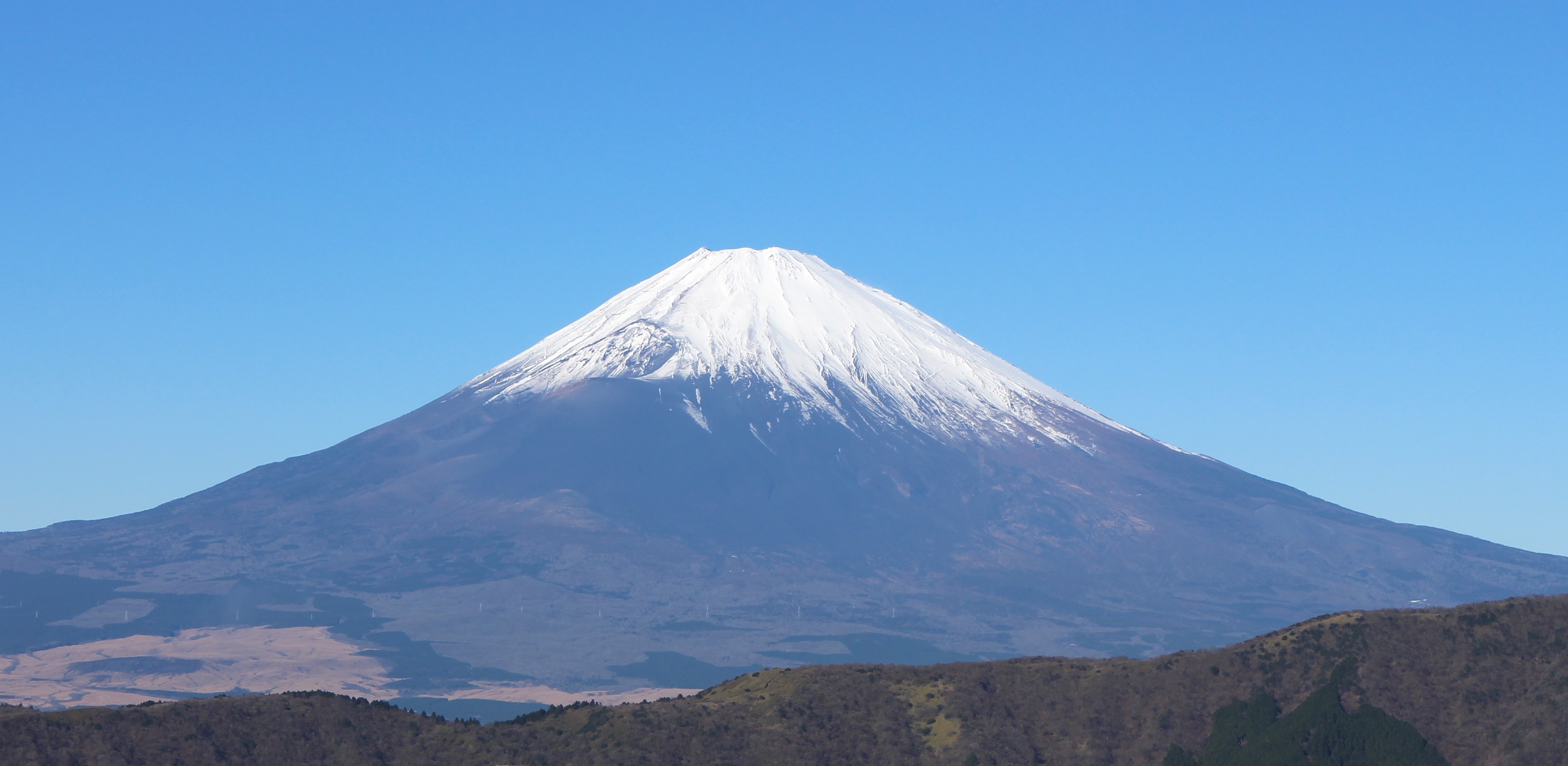
- Mount Fuji seen from Ōwakudani, 2021

Highest point
- Prominence: 3,776 m (12,388 ft); Ranked 35th
- Listing: Highest peak in Japan; Ultra-prominent peaks; List of mountains in Japan; 100 Famous Japanese Mountains; List of volcanoes by elevation
- Coordinates: 35°21′39″N 138°43′39″E

Naming
- Native name: 富士山 (Japanese)
- Pronunciation: [ɸɯꜜ(d)ʑisaɴ]

Geography
- Location within Japan Location within Shizuoka Prefecture Location within Yamanashi Prefecture
- Location: Fuji-Hakone-Izu National Park
- Country: Japan
- Prefectures: Shizuoka; Yamanashi
- Municipalities: Fuji; Fujinomiya; Fujiyoshida; Gotemba; Narusawa; Oyama
- Topo map(s): Geospatial Information Authority 25000:1 富士山; 50000:1 富士山

Geology
- Rock age: 100,000 years
- Mountain type: Stratovolcano
- Volcanic arc: Izu–Bonin–Mariana Arc
- Last eruption: 1707–08

Climbing
- First ascent: 663 by En no Odzunu (役行者, En no gyoja, En no Odzuno)
- Easiest route: Hiking

UNESCO World Heritage Site
- Official name: Fujisan, sacred place and source of artistic inspiration
- Criteria: Cultural: iii, vi
- Reference: 1418
- Inscription: 2013 (37th Session)
- Area: 20,702.1 ha (51,156 acres)
- Buffer zone: 49,627.7 ha (122,633 acres)

Mount Fuji
- "Mt. Fuji" in kanji

Japanese name
- Kanji: 富士山
- Hiragana: ふじさん
Transcriptions
- Revised Hepburn: Fujisan
- Kunrei-shiki: Huzisan

Mount Fuji (Note: English: /ˈfuː.dʒi/) (富士山・富士の山, Fujisan, Fuji no Yama (Note: Japanese: [ɸɯꜜ.(d)ʑi, ɸɯꜜ.(d)ʑi.saɴ, ɸɯꜜ.(d)ʑi no ja.ma])) is an active stratovolcano located on the Japanese island of Honshu, with a summit elevation of 3,776.24 m (12,389 ft 3 in). It is the highest mountain in Japan, the second-highest volcano on any Asian island (after Mount Kerinci on the Indonesian island of Sumatra), and the seventh-highest peak of an island on Earth. Mount Fuji last erupted from 1707 to 1708.

It is located about 100 km (62 mi) southwest of Tokyo, from which it is visible on clear days. It has an exceptionally symmetrical cone, which is covered in snow for about five months of the year. It is a Japanese cultural icon and is frequently depicted in art and photography, as well as visited by sightseers, hikers, and mountain climbers.

Mount Fuji is one of Japan's "Three Holy Mountains" (三霊山, Sanreizan) along with Mount Tate and Mount Haku. It is a Special Place of Scenic Beauty and one of Japan's Historic Sites. It was added to the World Heritage List as a Cultural Site on June 22, 2013. According to UNESCO, Mount Fuji has "inspired artists and poets and been the object of pilgrimage for centuries". UNESCO recognizes 25 sites of cultural interest within the Mount Fuji locality. These 25 locations include Mount Fuji and the Shinto shrine, Fujisan Hongū Sengen Taisha.

== Etymology ==
The current kanji for Mount Fuji, 富 and 士, mean "wealth" or "abundant" and "man of status" respectively. The origins of this spelling and the name Fuji continue to be debated. In Japanese, kanji characters are often applied by sound, and the meaning of the kanji may have nothing to do with the name of the mountain. It was named Fuji before the kanji was applied to it.

富士山記 (Fuji-san Ki) written by Miyako no Yoshika (都良香) in Heian period states, ”The name of the mountain, Fuji, is taken from the name of the county."

A text of the 9th century, Tale of the Bamboo Cutter, says that the name came from "immortal" (不死, fushi, fuji) and also from the image of abundant (富, fu) soldiers (士, shi, ji) (Note: Although the word 士 can mean a soldier (兵士, heishi, heiji), or a samurai (武士, bushi), its original meaning is a man with a certain status.) ascending the mountain slopes. An early folk etymology claims that Fuji came from 不二 (not + two), meaning without equal or nonpareil. Another claims that it came from 不盡 (not + to exhaust), meaning never-ending.

Hirata Atsutane, a Japanese classical scholar in the Edo period, speculated that the name is from a word meaning "a mountain standing up shapely as an ear (穗, ho) of a rice plant". British missionary John Batchelor (1855–1944) argued that the name is from the Ainu word for "fire" (fuchi) of the fire deity Kamui Fuchi, which was denied by a Japanese linguist Kyōsuke Kindaichi on the grounds of phonetic development (sound change). Fuji and Fuchi are known to be false friends, and Batchelor's argument is rejected by modern academics. Huchi means "old woman" and ape is the word for "fire", thus ape huchi kamuy is the fire deity. Research on the distribution of place names that fuji suggests that fuji originates in the Yamato language rather than Ainu. Japanese toponymist Kanji Kagami claimed that the name has the same root as wisteria (藤, fuji) and rainbow (虹, niji; but with an alternative reading, fuji), and came from its "long well-shaped slope".

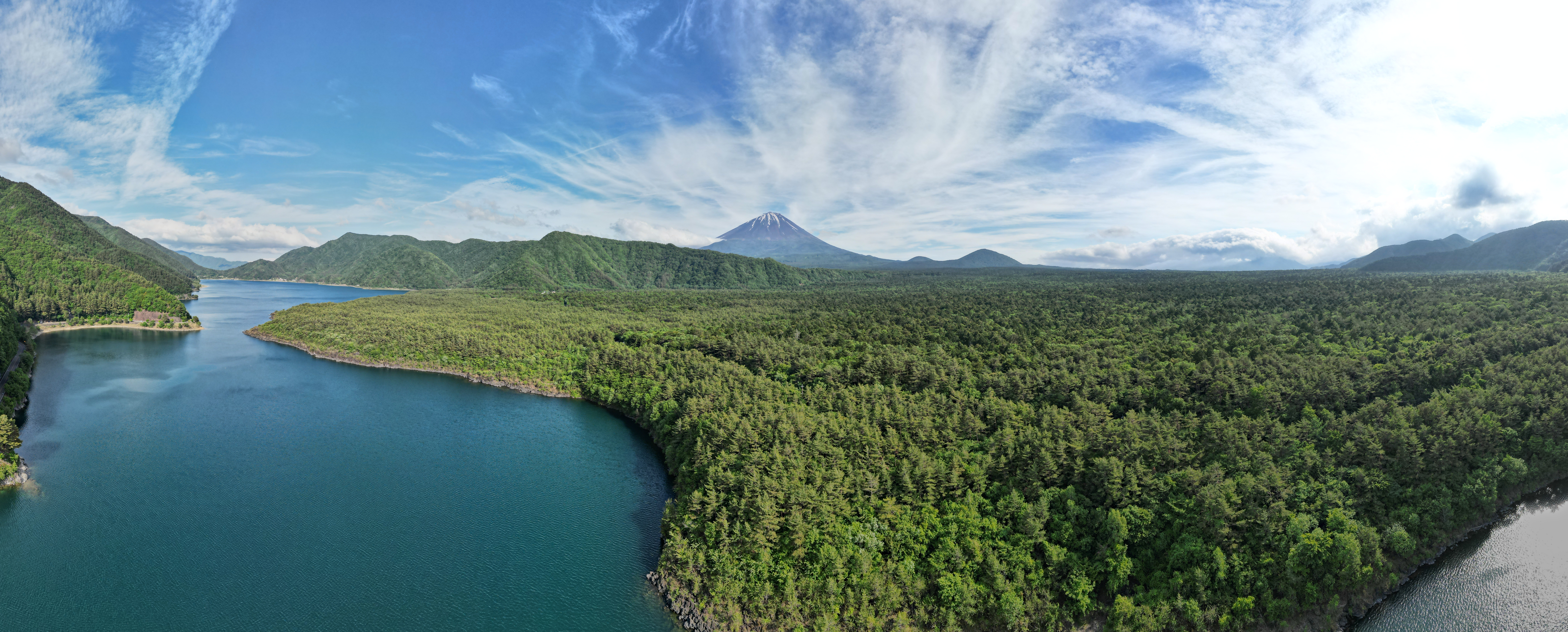
Aerial panorama of Mount Fuji from Lake Saiko, June 2023

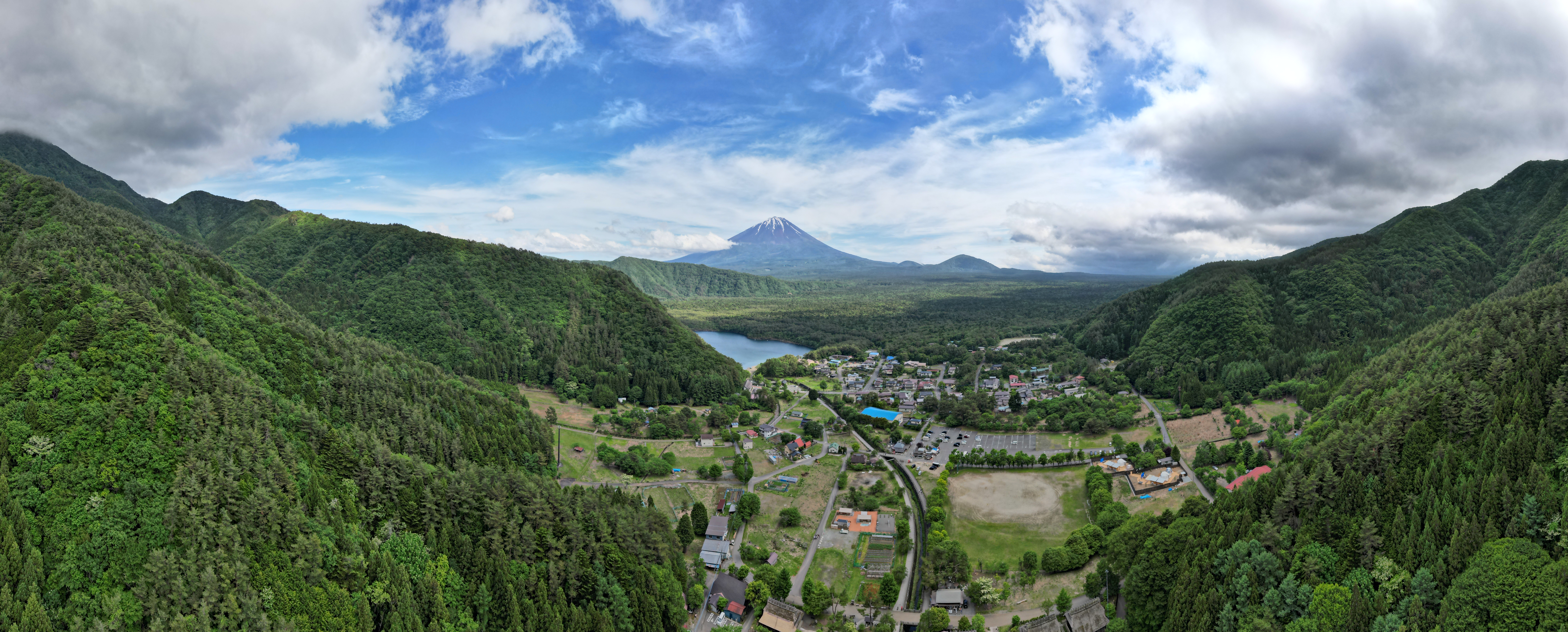
Aerial panorama of Mount Fuji with Saiko Iyashi-no-Sato Nenba in the foreground, June 2023

Vovin proposed an alternative hypothesis based on Old Japanese reading */puⁿzi/: the word may have been borrowed from Eastern Old Japanese */pu nusi/ 火主, meaning "fire master".

=== Variations ===
In English, the mountain is known as Mount Fuji. Some sources refer to it as "Fuji-san", "Fujiyama" or, redundantly, "Mt. Fujiyama". Japanese speakers refer to the mountain as "Fuji-san". This "san" is not the honorific suffix used with people's names, but the on'yomi of the character yama (山; "mountain") used in Sino-Japanese vocabulary. In Nihon-shiki and Kunrei-shiki romanization, the name is transliterated Huzi.

Other Japanese names that have become obsolete or poetic include Fuji-no-Yama (ふじの山; "the Mountain of Fuji"), Fuji-no-Takane (ふじの高嶺; "the High Peak of Fuji"), Fuyō-hō (芙蓉峰; "the Lotus Peak"), and Fugaku (富岳／富嶽), created by combining the first character of 富士, Fuji, and 岳, mountain.

== History ==
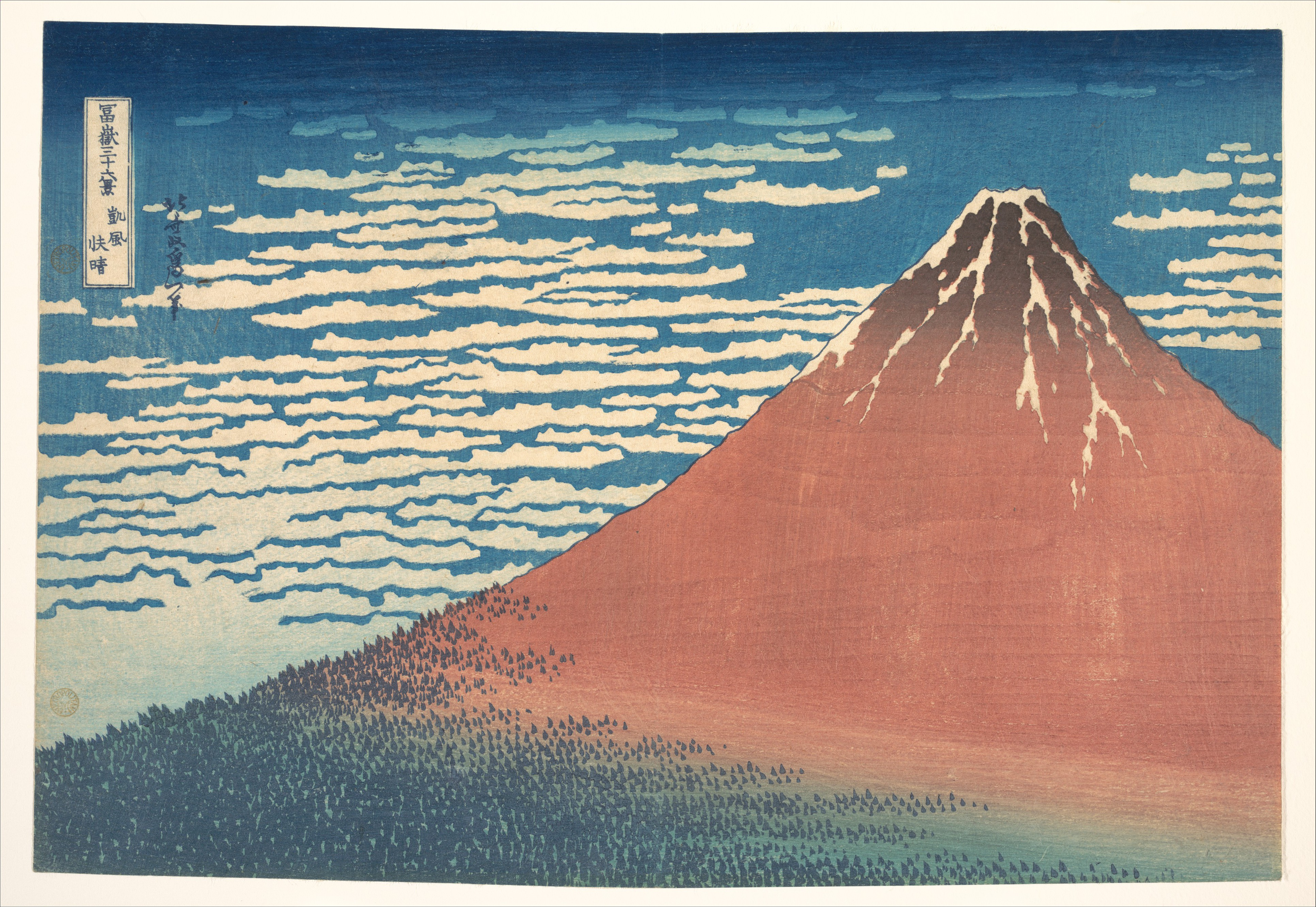
Fine Wind, Clear Morning woodblock print by Hokusai, 19th century

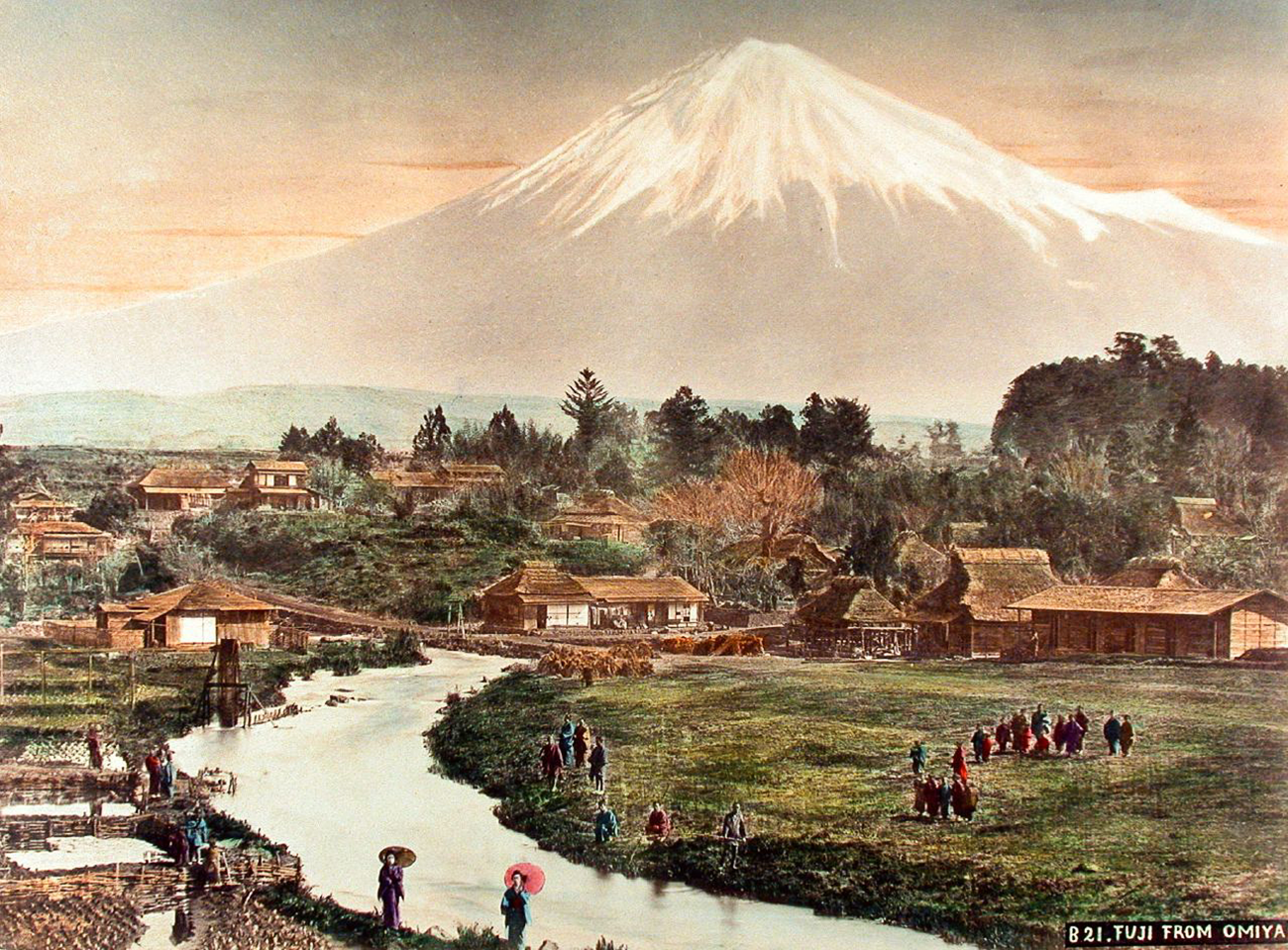
Mount Fuji from Omiya (now part of Fujinomiya), c. 1890

Mount Fuji is widely regarded to have an attractive volcanic cone. It has been a frequent subject of Japanese art, especially after 1600, when Edo (now Tokyo) became the capital and people saw the mountain while traveling on the Tōkaidō road. According to historian H. Byron Earhart, "in medieval times it eventually came to be seen by Japanese as the "number one" mountain of the known world of the three countries of India, China, and Japan". The mountain is mentioned in Japanese literature throughout the ages and is the subject of many poems.

The summit has been thought of as sacred since ancient times, and was therefore forbidden to women. In 1872 the Japanese government issued an edict (May 4, 1872, Grand Council of State Edict 98) stating, "Any remaining practices of female exclusion on shrine and temple lands shall be immediately abolished, and mountain climbing for worship, etc., shall be permitted." Tatsu Takayama was the first woman on record to summit Mount Fuji in the fall of 1832.

Ancient samurai used the base of the mountain as a remote training area, near the present-day town of Gotemba. The shōgun Minamoto no Yoritomo held yabusame archery contests in the area in the early Kamakura period.

The first ascent by a foreigner was by Sir Rutherford Alcock in September 1860, who ascended the mountain in 8 hours and descended in 3 hours. Alcock's brief narrative in The Capital of the Tycoon was the first widely disseminated description of the mountain in the West. Lady Fanny Parkes, the wife of British ambassador Sir Harry Parkes, was the first non-Japanese woman to summit, in 1867. Photographer Felix Beato climbed Mount Fuji two years later.

On April 30, 1936, Mount Rainier National Park of the U.S. and Japan’s Fuji-Hakone National Park started a first-of-its-kind international 'sister mountain' relationship, with Rainier affectionately known as 'Tacoma-Fuji' by Japanese American immigrants of the Seattle area.

On March 5, 1966, BOAC Flight 911, a Boeing 707, broke up in flight and crashed near the Mount Fuji Gotemba New fifth station, shortly after departure. All 113 passengers and 11 crew members died in the crash, which was attributed to clear-air turbulence caused by lee waves downwind of the mountain. A memorial for the crash victims sits near Gotemba New Fifth Station.

Today, Mount Fuji is an international destination for tourism and mountain climbing. In the early 20th century, lectures by populist educator Frederick Starr Chautauqua about his ascents of Mount Fuji were widely known in America. A Japanese saying suggests that a wise person will climb Mount Fuji once in their lifetime, but only a fool would climb it twice. It remains a popular symbol in Japanese culture, including making numerous movie appearances, inspiring the Infiniti logo, and appearing in medicine with the Mount Fuji sign.

In September 2004, the staffed weather station at the summit was closed after 72 years in operation. Observers monitored radar sweeps that detected typhoons and heavy rains. The station, which was the highest in Japan at 3,780 m (12,402 ft), was replaced by an automated system.

Mount Fuji was added to the World Heritage List as a Cultural Site on June 22, 2013.

== Geography ==
Mount Fuji as seen from the air and from the window of a bullet train, 2014

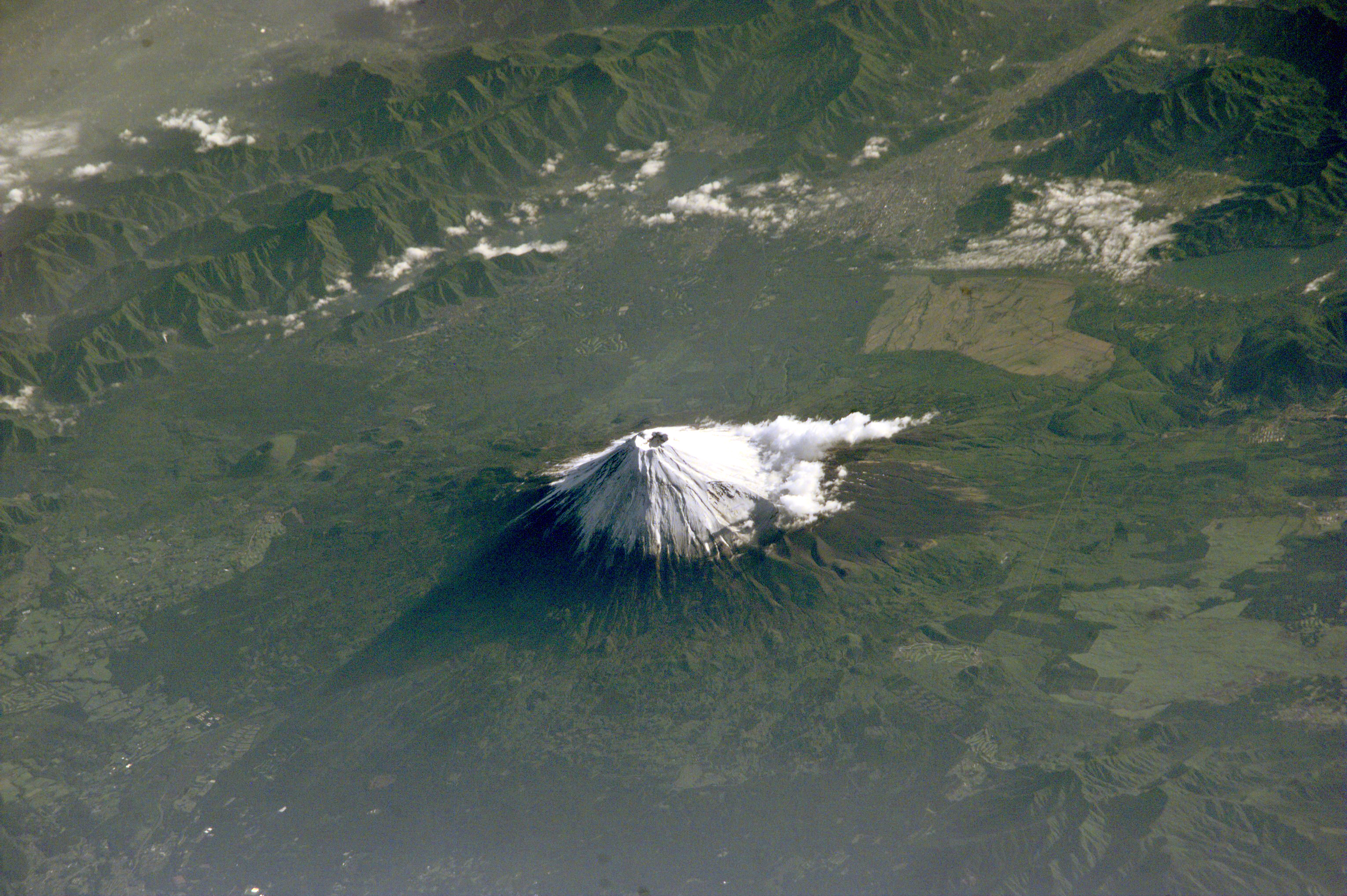
Fuji in early summer seen from the International Space Station (May 2001)

Mount Fuji is a distinctive feature of the geography of Japan. It stands 3,776.24 m (12,389 ft) tall and is located near the Pacific coast of central Honshu, just southwest of Tokyo. It straddles the boundary of Shizuoka and Yamanashi prefectures. Four small cities surround it - Gotemba to the east, Fujiyoshida to the north, Fujinomiya to the southwest, and Fuji to the south - accompanied by towns and villages. It is surrounded by five lakes: Lake Kawaguchi, Lake Yamanaka, Lake Sai, Lake Motosu and Lake Shōji. They, and nearby Lake Ashi in Kanagawa Prefecture, provide views. The mountain is part of Fuji-Hakone-Izu National Park. It can be seen more distantly from Yokohama, Tokyo, and sometimes as far as Chiba, Saitama, Tochigi, Ibaraki and Lake Hamana under skies. It was photographed from space during a space shuttle mission.

== Climate ==
The summit has a tundra climate (Köppen climate classification ET). The temperature is low at high altitude, and the cone is covered by snow for several months of the year. The lowest recorded temperature is −38.0 °C (−36.4 °F) recorded in February 1981, and the highest temperature was 17.8 °C (64.0 °F) recorded in August 1942.

Fuji's seasonal snowcap appears at an average date of 2 October. In 2024, the snowcap formed on 6 November, the latest-occurring since records began in 1894.

Climate data for Mt. Fuji (1991–2020 normals, extremes 1932–present)
Month	Jan	Feb	Mar	Apr	May	Jun	Jul	Aug	Sep	Oct	Nov	Dec	Year
Record high °C (°F)	−1.7 (28.9)	0.0 (32.0)	1.0 (33.8)	4.7 (40.5)	12.2 (54.0)	13.2 (55.8)	17.4 (63.3)	17.8 (64.0)	16.3 (61.3)	14.0 (57.2)	6.9 (44.4)	3.6 (38.5)	17.8 (64.0)
Mean maximum °C (°F)	−5.9 (21.4)	−4.2 (24.4)	−1.7 (28.9)	0.8 (33.4)	5.5 (41.9)	9.3 (48.7)	13.2 (55.8)	14.0 (57.2)	12.7 (54.9)	7.8 (46.0)	1.2 (34.2)	−2.9 (26.8)	15.0 (59.0)
Mean daily maximum °C (°F)	−15.3 (4.5)	−14.3 (6.3)	−10.9 (12.4)	−5.9 (21.4)	−0.6 (30.9)	4.0 (39.2)	8.0 (46.4)	9.5 (49.1)	6.5 (43.7)	0.7 (33.3)	−5.9 (21.4)	−12.2 (10.0)	−3.0 (26.6)
Daily mean °C (°F)	−18.2 (−0.8)	−17.4 (0.7)	−14.1 (6.6)	−8.8 (16.2)	−3.2 (26.2)	1.4 (34.5)	5.3 (41.5)	6.4 (43.5)	3.5 (38.3)	−2.0 (28.4)	−8.7 (16.3)	−15.1 (4.8)	−5.9 (21.4)
Mean daily minimum °C (°F)	−21.4 (−6.5)	−21.1 (−6.0)	−17.7 (0.1)	−12.2 (10.0)	−6.3 (20.7)	−1.4 (29.5)	2.8 (37.0)	3.8 (38.8)	0.6 (33.1)	−5.1 (22.8)	−11.8 (10.8)	−18.3 (−0.9)	−9.0 (15.8)
Mean minimum °C (°F)	−30.4 (−22.7)	−29.6 (−21.3)	−26.9 (−16.4)	−21.2 (−6.2)	−13.4 (7.9)	−7.4 (18.7)	−1.2 (29.8)	−0.2 (31.6)	−5.9 (21.4)	−12.0 (10.4)	−20.0 (−4.0)	−27.5 (−17.5)	−31.8 (−25.2)
Record low °C (°F)	−37.3 (−35.1)	−38.0 (−36.4)	−33.9 (−29.0)	−27.8 (−18.0)	−18.9 (−2.0)	−13.1 (8.4)	−6.9 (19.6)	−4.3 (24.3)	−10.8 (12.6)	−19.5 (−3.1)	−28.1 (−18.6)	−33.0 (−27.4)	−38.0 (−36.4)
Average relative humidity (%)	53	56	61	63	60	70	79	75	67	53	52	52	62
Source: Japan Meteorological Agency

== Geology ==
Relief map and animation realized with SRTM data

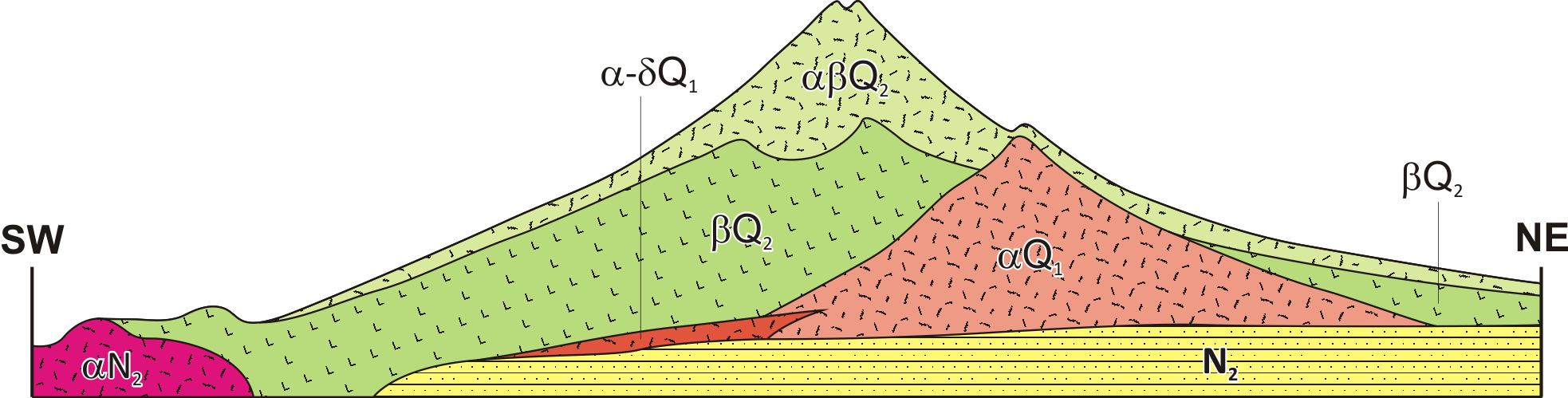
Geological cross-section of Fuji volcano. Key: N_{2} = Tertiary sedimentary rocks; αN_{2} = Tertiary volcanic rocks; αQ_{1} = Komitake volcano; α-δQ_{1} = Ashitaka volcano; βQ_{2} = Older Fuji volcano; αβQ_{2} = Younger Fuji volcano.

Mount Fuji is located at a triple junction trench where the Eurasian Plate, North American Plate, and Philippine Sea Plate meet. These three plates form the western part of Japan, the eastern part of Japan, and the Izu Peninsula respectively. The Pacific Plate is subducting beneath these plates, resulting in volcanic activity. Mount Fuji is located near three island arcs: the Southwestern Japan Arc, the Northeastern Japan Arc, and the Izu-Bonin-Mariana Arc. The Fuji triple junction is only 400 kilometres (250 mi) from the Boso triple junction.

Fuji's main crater is 780 m (2,560 ft) in diameter and 240 m (790 ft) deep. The bottom of the crater is 100–130 m (330–430 ft) in diameter. Slope angles from the crater to a distance of 1.5–2 km (0.93–1.24 mi) are 31°–35°, the angle of repose for dry gravel. Beyond this distance, slope angles are about 27°, which is caused by an increase in scoria. Mid-flank slope angles decrease from 23° to less than 10° in the piedmont.

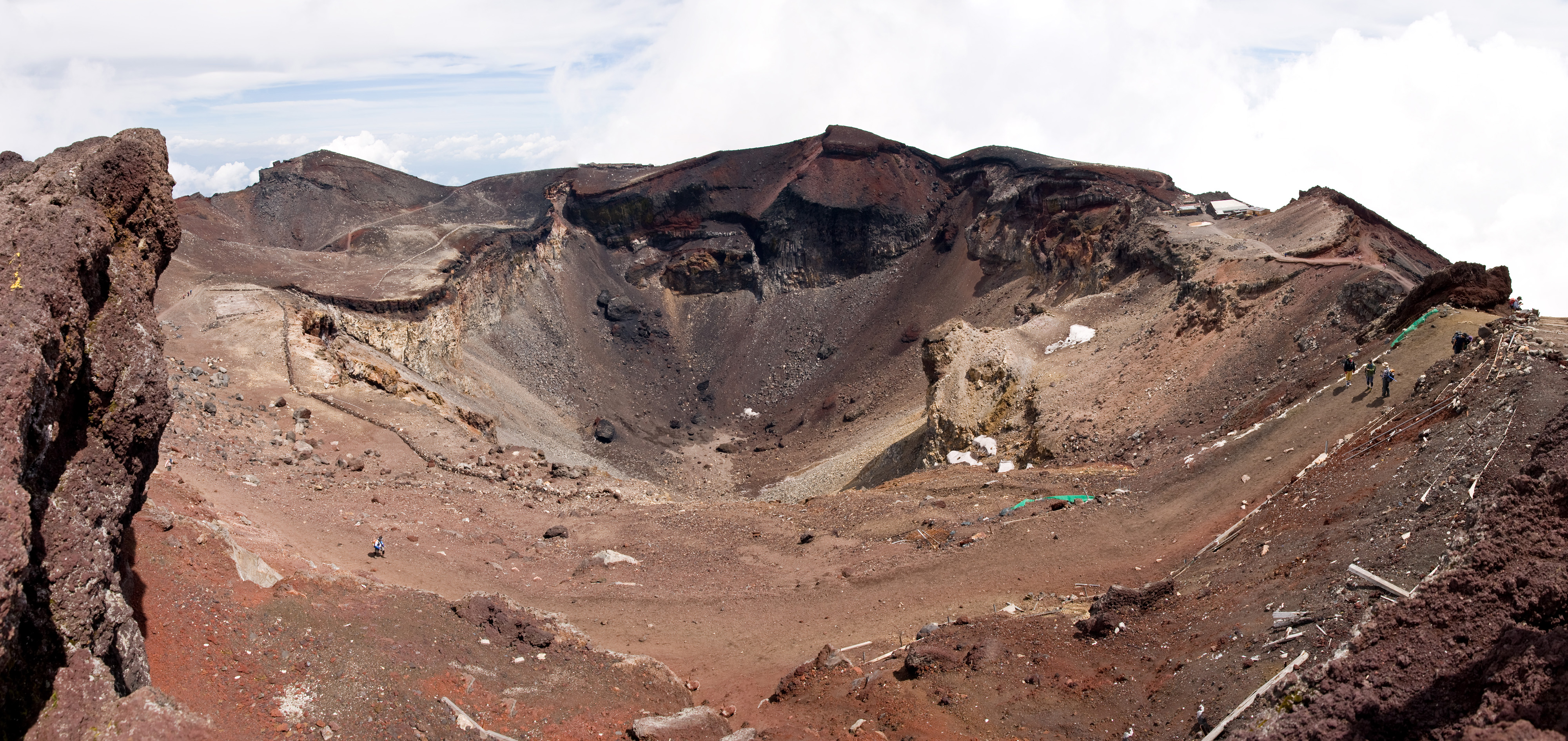
Crater with the Eight Sacred Peaks (Hasshin-po)

Scientists have identified four distinct phases of volcanic activity in the formation of Mount Fuji. The first phase, called Sen-komitake, is composed of an andesite core deep within the mountain, discovered in 2004. Sen-komitake was followed by the "Komitake Fuji", a basalt layer believed to have formed several hundred thousand years ago. Approximately 100,000 years ago, "Old Fuji" was formed over the top of Komitake Fuji. The modern, "New Fuji" is believed to have formed over the top of Old Fuji around 10,000 years ago.

Pre-Komitake started erupting in the Middle Pleistocene in an area seven km (4 1/2 mi) north of Mount Fuji. After a relatively short pause, eruptions began again, which formed Komitake Volcano. These eruptions ended 100,000 years ago. Ashitaka Volcano was active from 400,000 to 100,000 years ago and is located 20 km (12 mi) southeast of Mount Fuji. Mount Fuji started erupting 100,000 years ago, with Ko-Fuji (old-Fuji) forming 100,000 to 17,000 years ago, but it is now almost completely buried. A large landslide on the southwest flank occurred about 18,000 years ago. Shin-Fuji (new-Fuji) eruptions in the form of lava, lapilli, and volcanic ash have occurred between 17,000 and 8,000 years ago, between 7,000 and 3,500 years ago, and between 4,000 and 2,000 years ago. Flank eruptions, mostly in the form of parasitic cinder cones, ceased in 1707. The largest cone, Omuro-Yama, is one of more than 100 cones aligned NW-SE and NE-SW through the summit. Mt. Fuji also has more than 70 lava tunnels and extensive lava tree molds. Two large landslides are at the head of the Yoshida-Osawa and Osawa-Kuzure valleys.

As of December 2002, the volcano was classified as active with a low risk of eruption. The last recorded eruption was the Hōei eruption which started on December 16, 1707 (Hōei 4, 23rd day of the 11th month), and ended about January 1, 1708 (Hōei 4, 9th day of the 12th month). The eruption formed a new crater and a second peak, named Mount Hōei, halfway down its southeastern side. Fuji spewed cinders and ash that resembled rainfall in Izu, Kai, Sagami, and Musashi. Since then, no signs of an eruption are recorded. On the evening of March 15, 2011, however, a magnitude 6.2 earthquake at shallow depth occurred a few kilometres from Mount Fuji on its southern side.

=== Recorded eruptions ===
About 11,000 years ago, a large amount of lava erupted from the west side of the top. This lava formed new Fuji, which is the main body of Mount Fuji. Since then, the tops of ancient Fuji and new Fuji have been side by side. About 2,500–2,800 years ago, the top part of ancient Fuji was destroyed in a large sector collapse and only the top of Shin-Fuji remained. Ten known eruptions can be traced to reliable records.

Date(s)	Notes	Ref.
July 31, 781	The eruption was recorded in the Shoku Nihongi, and it was noted that "ash fell", but there are no other details.	
April 11 – May 15, 800; February 13, 802	The Nihon Kiryaku states that during the first phase, the skies were dark even during the daytime. The second phase is known from the Nippon Kiseki, which notes that gravel fell like hail.	
June–September 864; December 865 – January 866	Both phases were recorded in the Nihon Sandai Jitsuroku. This eruption created three of the Fuji Five Lakes: Motosu, Shōji, and Saiko, from a single lake that became separated by lava flow.	
November 937	This was recorded in the Nihon Kiryaku.	
March 999	It is noted in the Honchō Seiki that news of an eruption was brought to Kyoto, but no other details are known.	
January 1033	According to the Nihon Kiryaku, news of this eruption was brought to Kyoto two months later.	
April 17, 1083	The only contemporary recording of this was written by a Buddhist monk and can be found in the Fusō Ryakuki. Later writings indicate that the sound of the eruption may have been heard in Kyoto.	
between January 30, 1435, and January 18, 1436	A record of this appears in the Ōdaiki, a chronicle kept by the monks at Kubo Hachiman Shrine in Yamanashi City, and it states that a flame was visible on Mount Fuji. As there is no mention of smoke, this appears to have been a Hawaiian eruption (lava only).	
August 1511	The Katsuyamaki (or Myōhōjiki), written by monks at Myōhō-ji in Fujikawaguchiko, indicates that there was a fire on Mount Fuji at this time, but as there is no vegetation at the described location, this was almost certainly a lava flow.	
December 16, 1707	The Hōei eruption	

=== Current eruptive danger ===
Following the 2011 Tōhoku earthquake, media speculated that the shock might induce volcanic unrest at Mount Fuji. In September 2012, mathematical models created by the National Research Institute for Earth Science and Disaster Prevention (NRIESDP) suggested that the pressure in Mount Fuji's magma chamber could be 1.6 megapascals higher than before its 1707 eruption. This was interpreted by some media outlets to mean that an eruption of Mount Fuji could be imminent. Absent any method of directly measuring the pressure of a volcano's magma chamber however, indirect calculations of the type used by NRIESDP remained speculative and unverifiable. Other indicators suggestive of heightened eruptive danger, such as active fumaroles and recently discovered faults, are typical occurrences at this type of volcano.

Eruption fears continued into the 2020s. In 2021, a new hazard map was created to help residents plan for evacuation, stoking fears because of its increased estimate of lava flow and additional vents. Soon afterwards, a 4.8 magnitude earthquake hit the area. The Japan Meteorological Agency however, assured the public that the earthquake did not increase the eruption risk. In 2023, a new evacuation plan was developed to account for the 2021 hazard map update.

== Aokigahara forest ==
Main article: Aokigahara

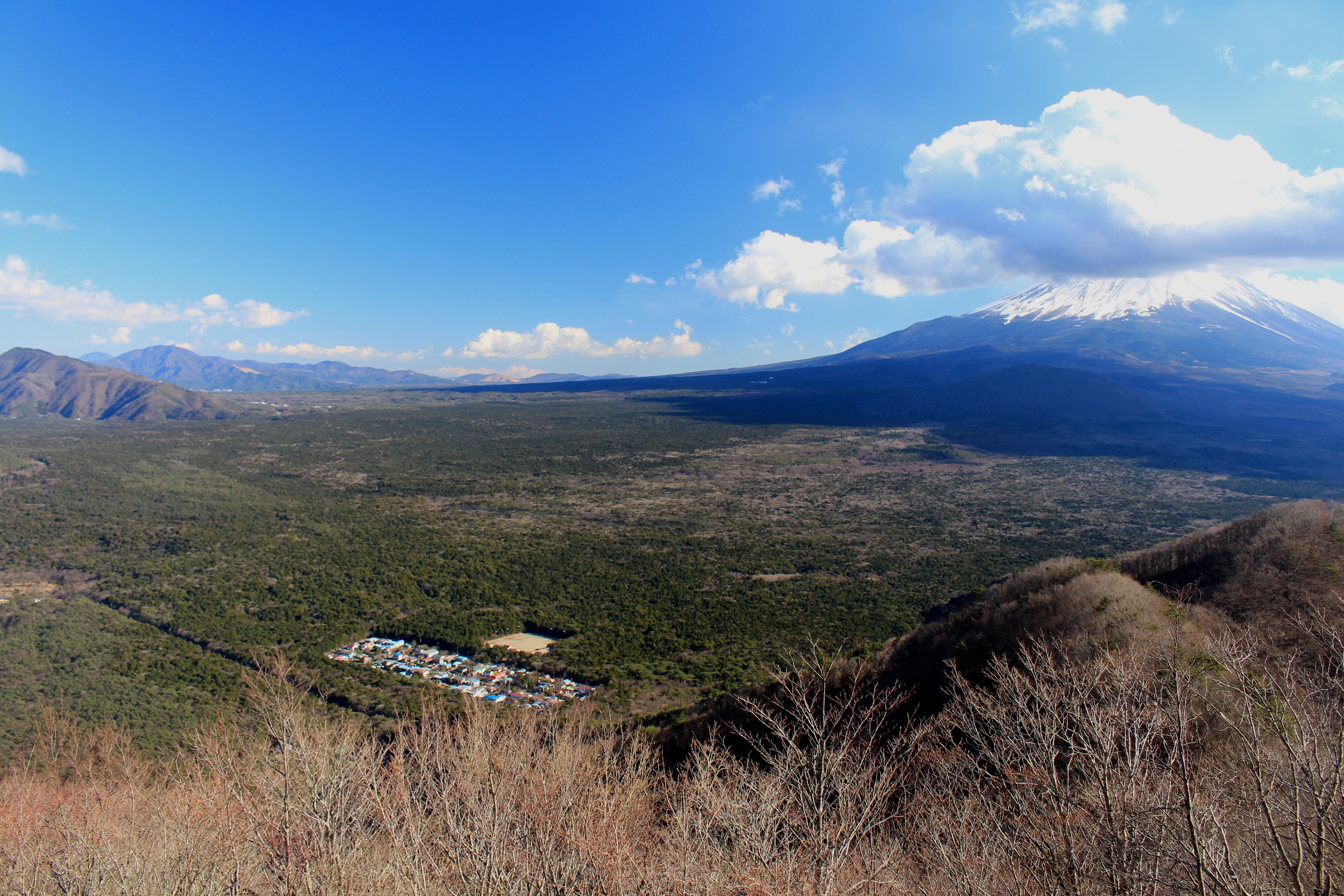
Aokigahara forest with Mount Fuji and Mount Ashiwada

Aokigahara forest sits at Fuji's northwest base. Folk tales and legends tell of ghosts, demons, yūrei and yōkai haunting the forest, and in the 19th century, Aokigahara was one of many places where poor families abandoned their young and elderly. Approximately 30 suicides are counted yearly, with a high of nearly 80 in 2002. The recent increase prompted local officials to erect signs that attempt to convince suicidal individuals to reconsider, which have disrupted some attempts. Earlier suicides have created an allure that has persisted across decades.

Many hikers mark their routes by leaving colored plastic tape behind as they pass, raising concern about effects on the forest's ecosystem.

== Access ==
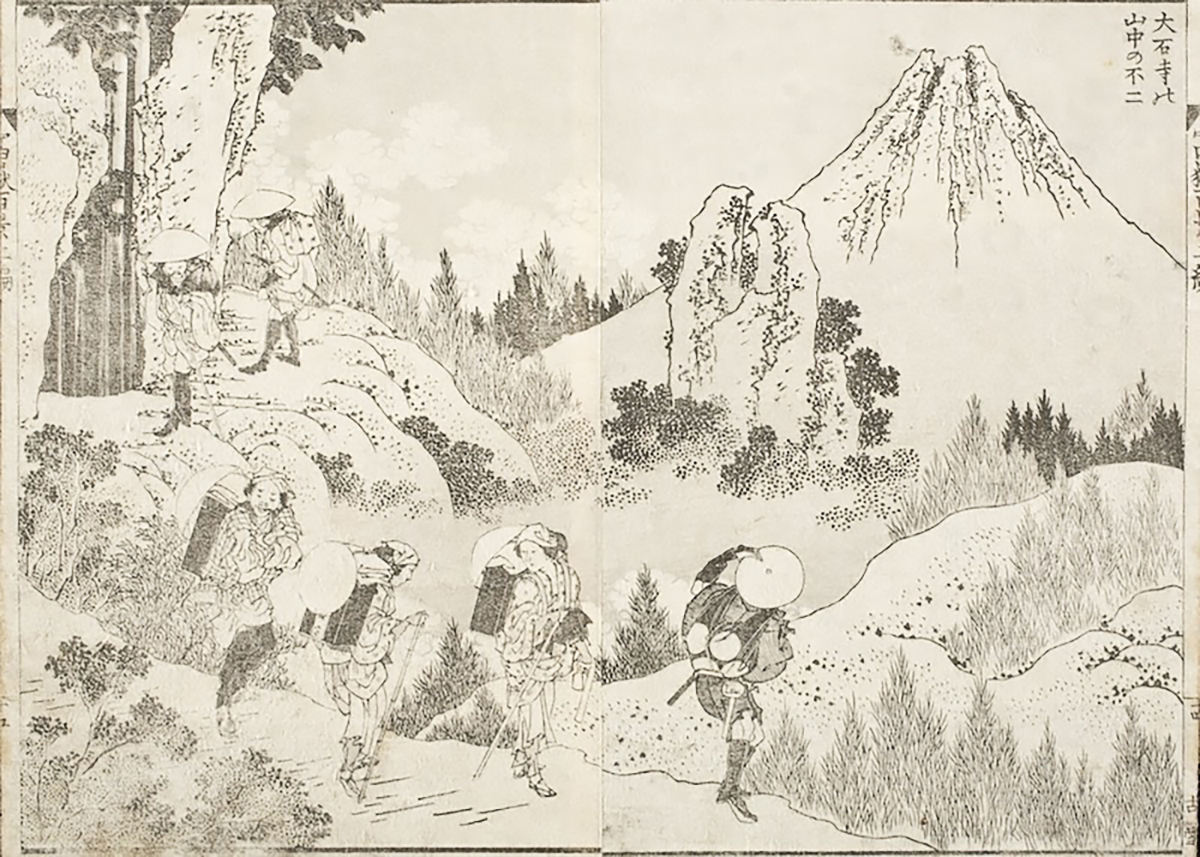
A view of Mount Fuji from the Taisekiji temple as depicted by the woodblock artist Katsushika Hokusai. The one hundred views of Mount Fuji. From the Elizabeth Joan Tanney estate, c. 1834.

=== Transport ===
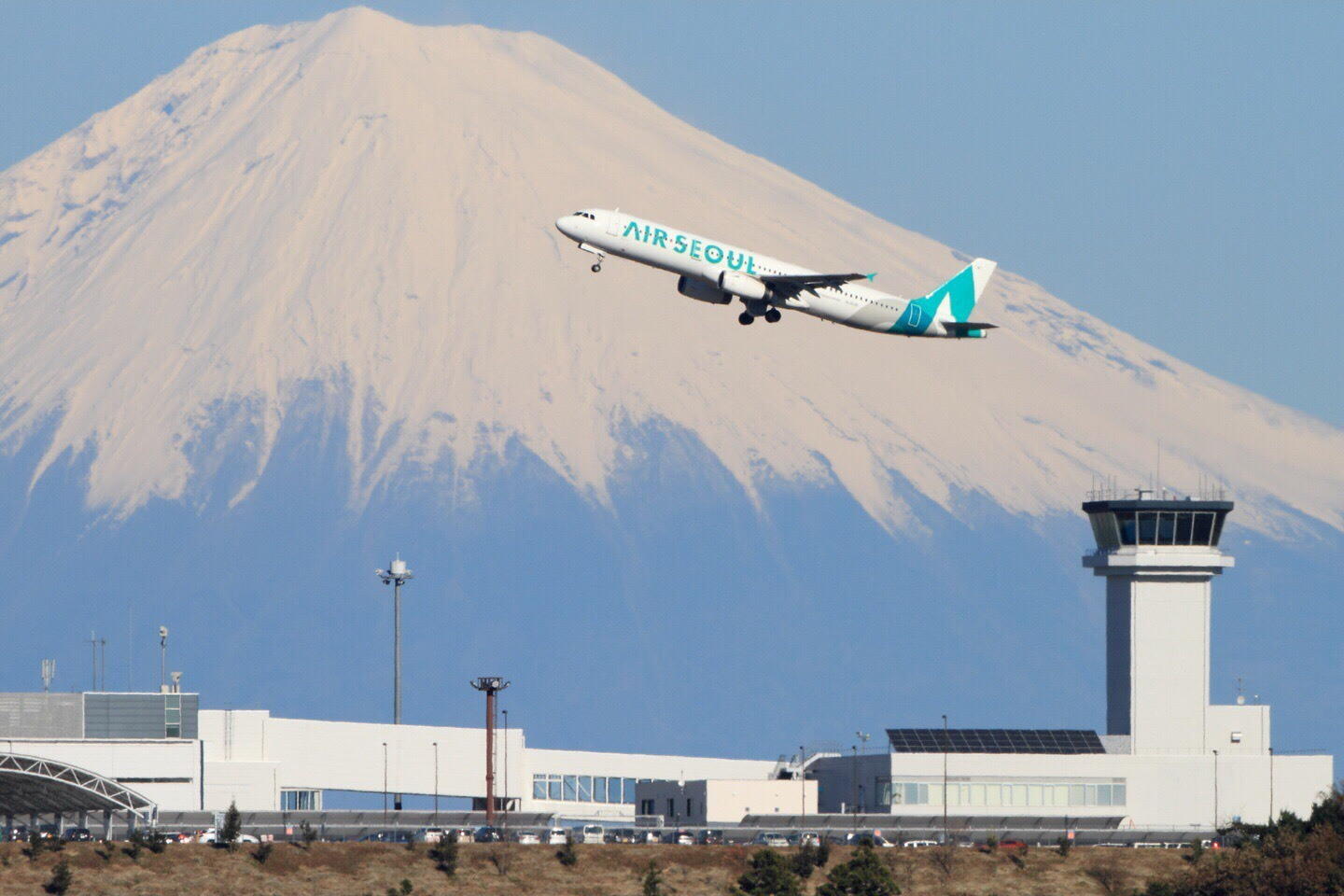
Shizuoka Airport is overlooked by Mount Fuji.

The closest airport with scheduled international service is Mt. Fuji Shizuoka Airport. It opened in June 2009. It is about 80 km (50 mi) from Mount Fuji. Tokyo International Airport (Haneda Airport) and Narita International Airport are approximately three hours and 15 minutes from Mount Fuji.

=== Climbing routes ===
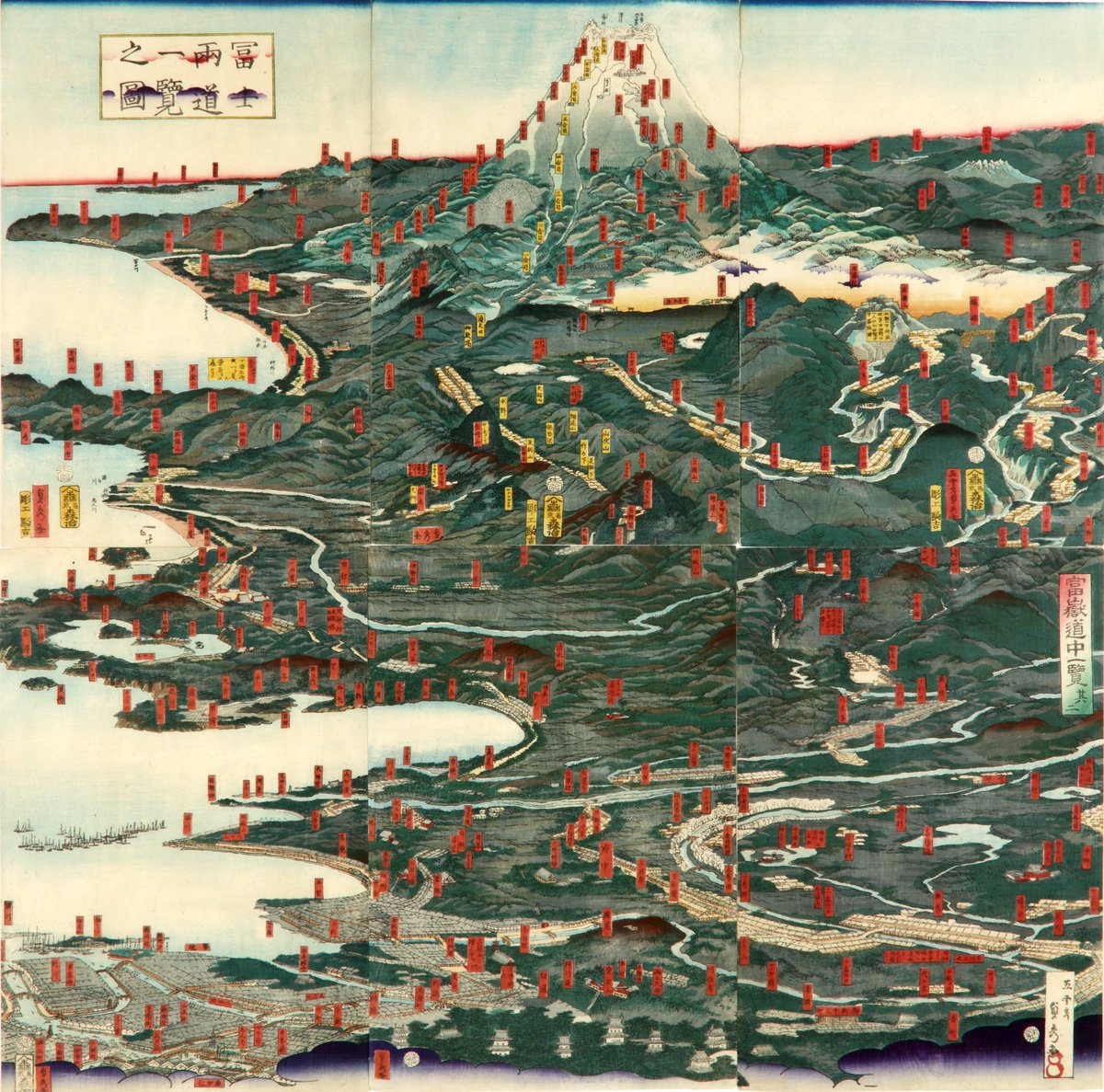
Historical illustration of the routes to Mount Fuji

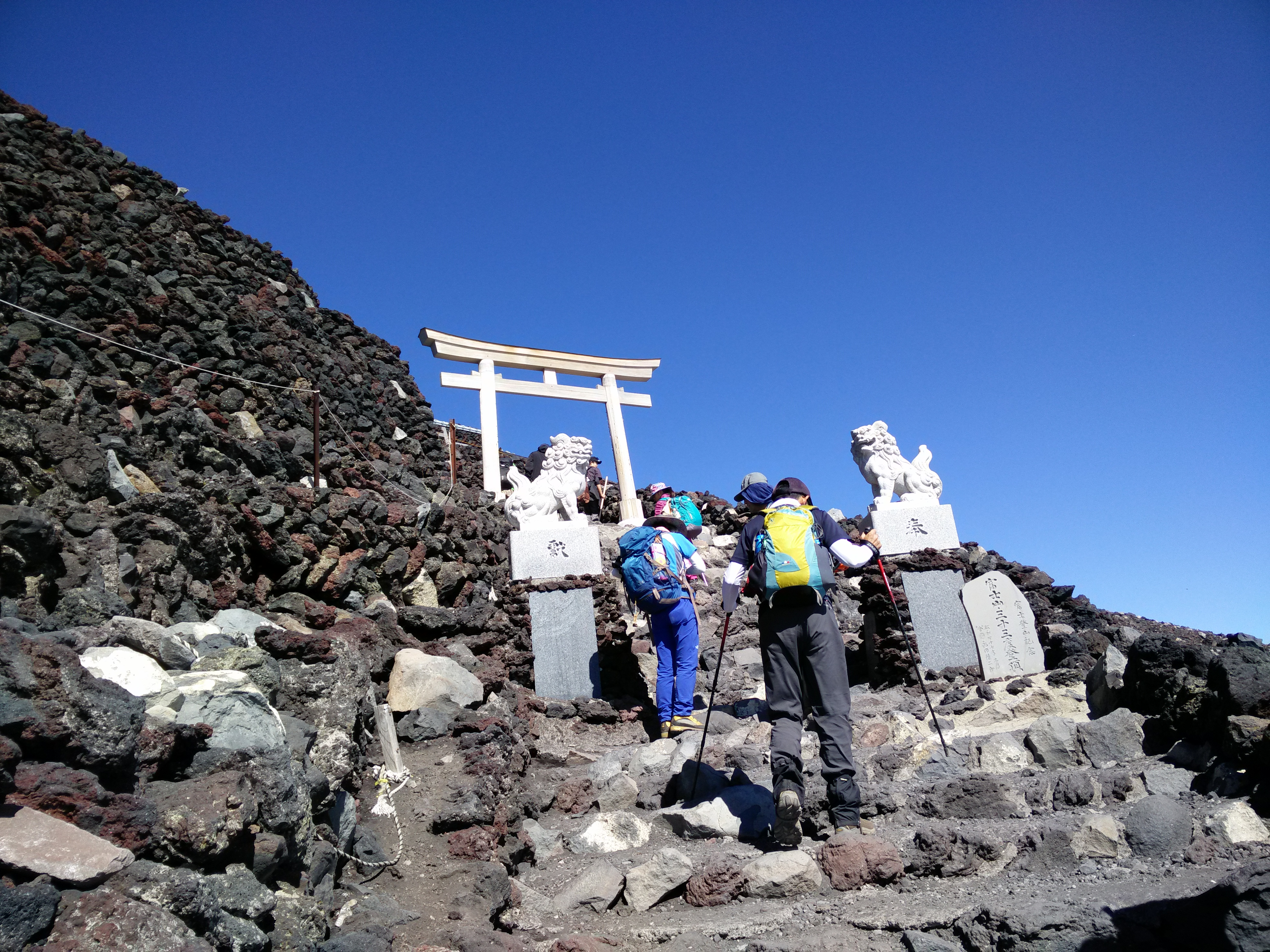
Torii near the summit

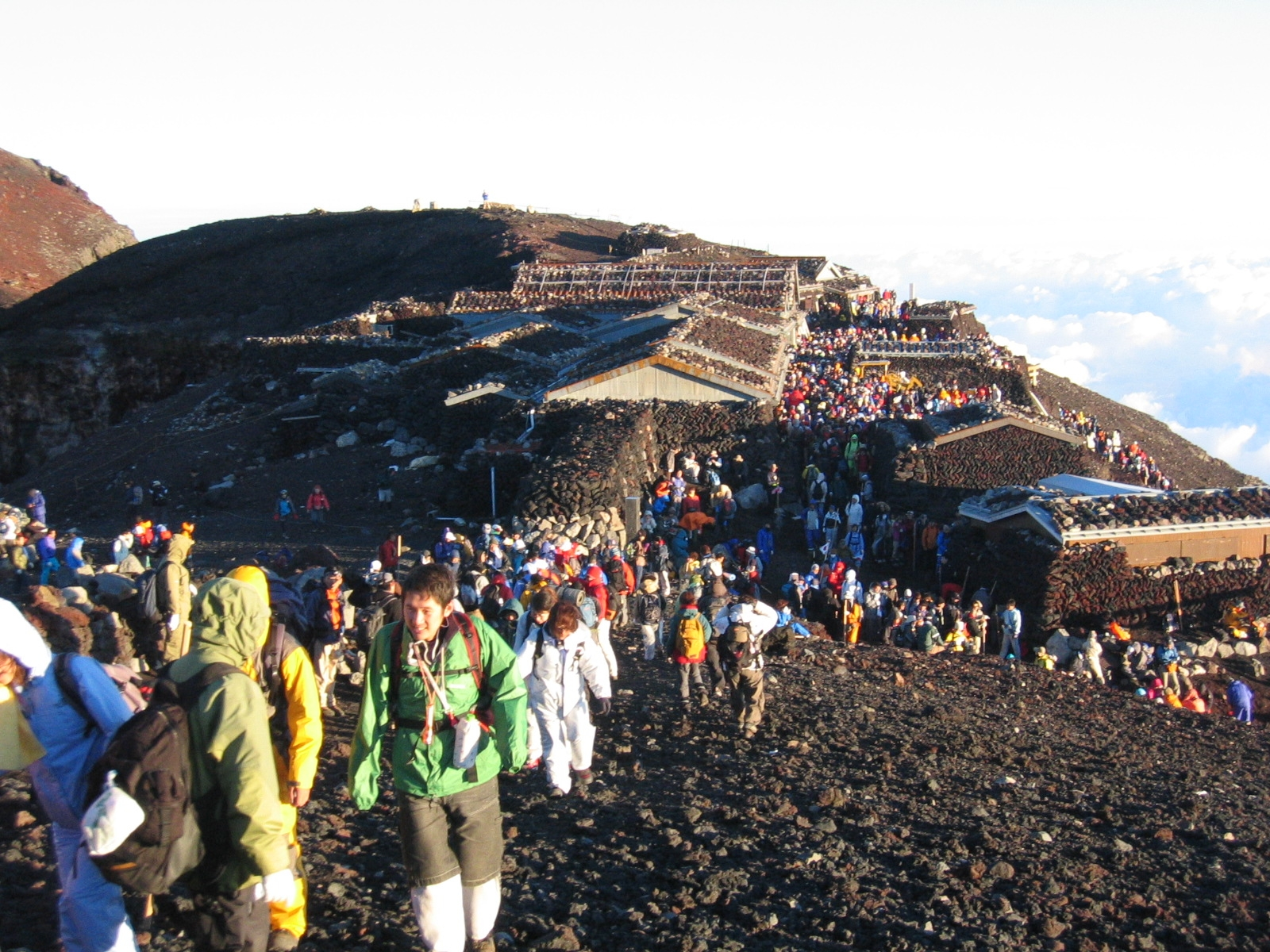
Hikers climbing Mount Fuji

Approximately 300,000 people climbed Mount Fuji in 2009. The most popular period for people to hike up Mount Fuji is from July to August, while huts and other facilities are operating and the weather is warmest. Buses to the trail heads typically used by climbers start running on July 1. Climbing from October to May is discouraged, after several high-profile deaths amid cold weather. Most Japanese climb the mountain at night to be in a position at or near the summit when the sun rises. The morning light is called 御来光 goraikō, "arrival of light".

The four major routes to the summit each have numbered stations along the way. They are (clockwise, starting north): Yoshida, Subashiri, Gotemba, and Fujinomiya routes. Climbers usually start at the fifth stations, as these are reachable by car or by bus. The summit is the tenth station on each trail. The stations on different routes are at different elevations; the highest fifth station is located at Fujinomiya, followed by Yoshida, Subashiri, and Gotemba. Four routes start from the base of the mountain: Shojiko, Yoshida, Suyama, and Murayama routes.

Even though it has only the second-highest elevation, the Yoshida route is the most popular. It offers a large parking area and many large mountain huts where climbers can rest or stay. During the summer season, most Mount Fuji climbing tour buses arrive there. The next most popular is the Fujinomiya route, which has the highest fifth station, followed by Subashiri and Gotemba. The ascent from the fifth station can take anywhere between five and seven hours, while the descent can take from three to four hours. Even though most climbers do not ascend the Subashiri and Gotemba routes, many descend these because of their ash-covered paths. From the seventh station to near the fifth station, running down these ash-covered paths takes approximately 30 minutes.

Tractor routes accompany the climbing routes. These routes are used to bring food and other materials to huts on the mountain. Because the tractors usually take up most of the width of these paths and tend to push large rocks from the side of the path, tractor paths are off-limits to climbers on sections that are not merged with the climbing or descending paths. Nevertheless, people often ride mountain bikes down tractor routes from the summit. This is particularly risky, as it may send rocks into others.

The four routes from the base of the mountain offer historical sites. Murayama is the oldest route, while the Yoshida route has many old shrines, teahouses, and huts along its path. These routes are gaining popularity and are undergoing restoration. Although still relatively uncommon, bears have been sighted along the Yoshida route.

Huts at and above the fifth stations are usually staffed during climbing season, but those below the fifth stations are not usually staffed. Yoshida has the most huts, while Gotemba has the fewest. The huts along the Gotemba route also tend to open later and close earlier than those along the Yoshida route. Because Mount Fuji is designated as a national park, it is illegal to camp above the fifth station.

Eight peaks surround the summit. The highest point in Japan, Ken-ga-mine, is where the Mount Fuji Radar System used to be (replaced by an automated system on October 1, 2008). Climbers can visit each of these peaks.

=== Paragliding ===
Paragliders take off in the vicinity of the fifth station, Gotemba parking lot, between Subashiri and Hōei-zan peak on Fuji's south side, and at other locations, depending on wind direction. Several paragliding schools use the wide sandy/grassy slope between Gotemba and Subashiri parking lots as a training hill.

=== Overtourism concerns ===
On 1 February 2024, the Yamanashi prefectural government imposed a mandatory fee of 2,000 yen ($13) for hikers using the Yoshida trail beginning in the summer season as part of efforts to ease congestion and provide funding for safety protocols. It later announced that it would impose a daily limit of 4,000 hikers on the trail and close it between 4 p.m. and 3 a.m. except for guests in mountain lodges. The Shizuoka prefectural government subsequently announced that it would close the Subashiri, Gotemba and Fujinomiya trails at the same time with the same exceptions, citing concerns over congestion.

== In culture ==
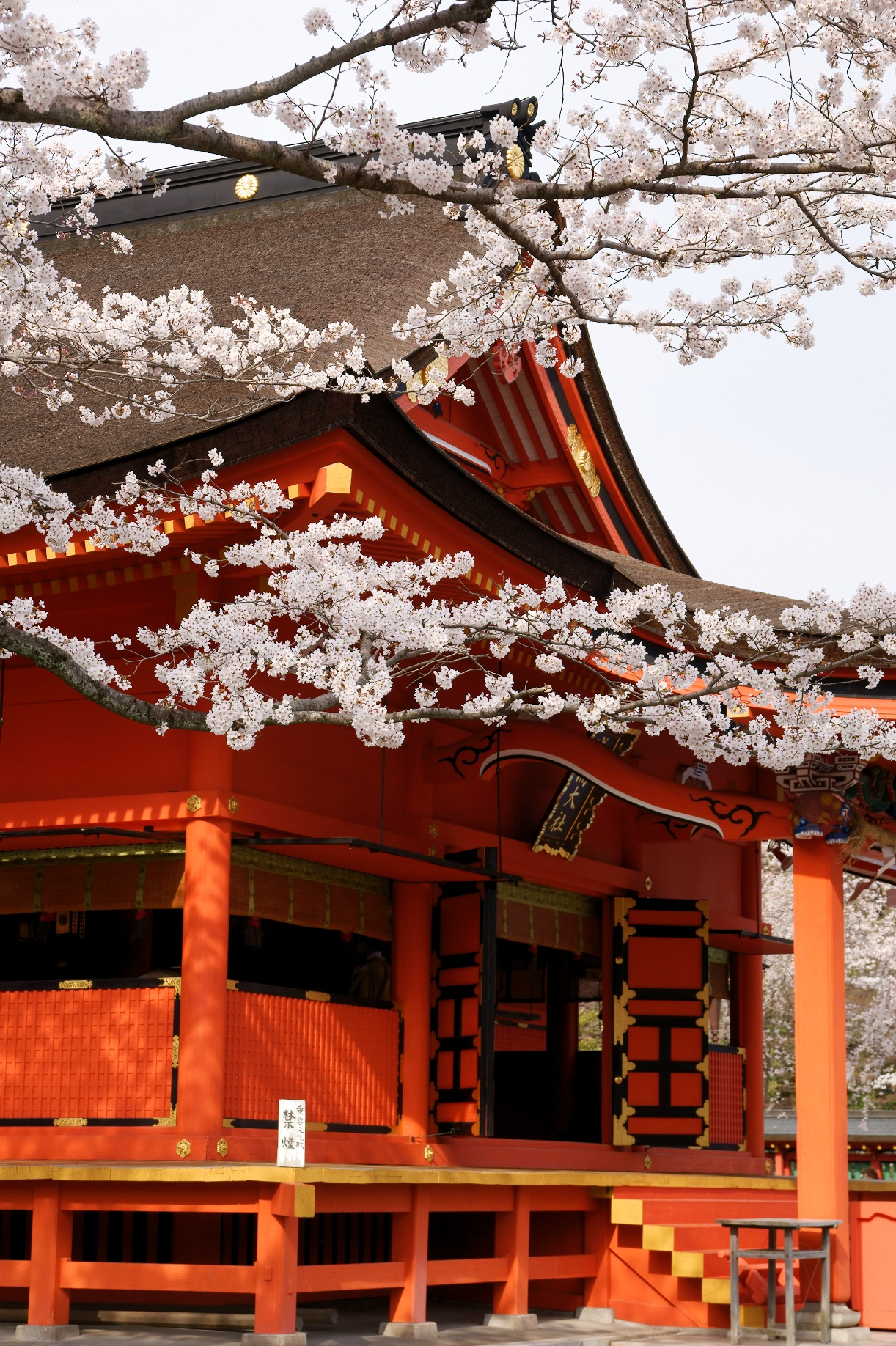
Outer shrine of Fujisan Hongū Sengen Taisha

=== Shinto mythology ===
In Shinto mythology, Kuninotokotachi (国之常立神 Kuninotokotachi-no-Kami in Kojiki, or 国常立尊 Kuninotokotachi-no-Mikoto in Nihon Shoki) is one of the two gods born from "something like a reed that arose from the soil" when the earth was chaotic. According to the Nihon Shoki, Konohanasakuya-hime, wife of Ninigi, is the goddess of Mount Fuji, where Fujisan Hongū Sengen Taisha is dedicated to her.

In ancient times, the mountain was worshipped from afar. The Asama shrine was set up at the foothills to ward off eruptions. In the Heian period (794–1185), volcanic activity subsided and Fuji was used as a base for Shugendō, a syncretic religion combining mountain worship and Buddhism. Worshippers began to climb the slopes, and by the early 12th century, Matsudai Shonin had founded a temple on the summit.

Fuji-kō was an Edo period cult centred around the mountain that was founded by an ascetic named Hasegawa Kakugyō (1541–1646). The cult venerated the mountain as a female deity, and encouraged its members to climb it. In doing so, they would be reborn, "purified and ... able to find happiness". The cult waned in the Meiji period, and although it persists to this day, it has been subsumed into Shintō sects.

=== Popular culture ===
As a national symbol of the country, the mountain has been depicted in media such as paintings, woodblock prints (such as Hokusai's Thirty-six Views of Mount Fuji and One Hundred Views of Mount Fuji from the 1830s), poetry, music, theater, film, manga, anime, pottery and even Kawaii subculture.

Before its explosive eruption in 1980, Mount St. Helens was once known as "The Fuji of America", for its striking resemblance to Mount Fuji. Mount Taranaki in New Zealand is also said to bear a resemblance to Mount Fuji, and for this reason has been used as a stand-in for the mountain in films, television and games such as the Civilization games, like Civilization V (2010), Civilization VI (2016) and Civilization VII (2025). It is featured in the Globe Trot party game in Wii Party (2010), as well as Asphalt Legends (2018), Silent Hill f (2025) and Forza Horizon 6 (2026).

== See also ==
- List of mountains and hills of Japan by height
- 100 Famous Japanese Mountains
- List of three-thousanders in Japan
- List of World Heritage sites in Japan
- List of elevation extremes by country
- Mount Araido (阿頼度山, Araidosan), Araido Island (阿頼度島), Kuril Islands
- Mount St. Helens
- Mount Rainier - a 'sister mountain' of Mount Fuji
