= Izu-Tobu =

Large range of volcanoes on the island of Honshu, Japan

- Izu-Tobu volcano field
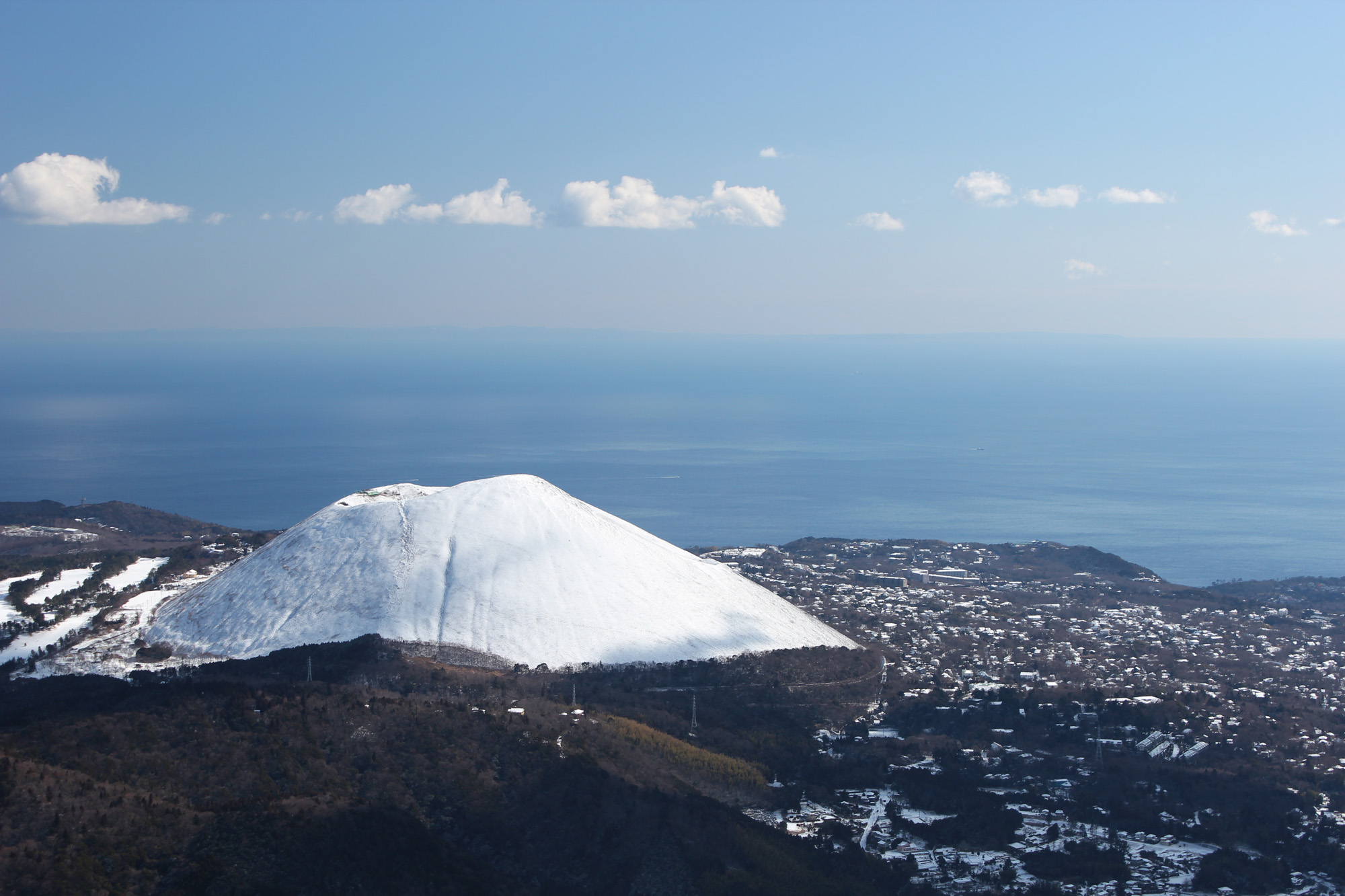
- Mount Ōmuro, a symbolic pyroclastic cone of the Izu-Tobu volcano field

Highest point
- Coordinates: 34°53′59″N 139°05′52″E

Naming
- Native name: 伊豆東部火山群 (Japanese)

Geography
- Location within Japan Location within Shizuoka Prefecture
- Location: Izu Peninsula, Shizuoka Prefecture, Japan

Geology
- Mountain type: Pyroclastic cones
- Last eruption: July 1989

Izu-Tobu (伊豆東部火山群, Izu Tōbu Kazangun) is a large, dominantly basaltic range of volcanoes on the east side of the Izu Peninsula which lies on the Pacific coast of the island of Honshu in Japan. The field covers a total area of 400 km^{2}. The only recorded activity was a submarine phreatic eruption, between the city of Itō and Hatsushima island, that lasted for just 10 minutes in 1989. Itō, home to 74,000 people, is known for its hot springs.

== Morphology ==
The field covers the east side of the Izu Peninsula. It consists of several small stratovolcanoes (mostly Pleistocene in age) and overlapping pyroclastic cones, which covers 400 km^{2} in area. There are 70 young monogenetic volcanoes on land. Kawagodaira maar, which is about 3,000 years old, produced a large Holocene eruption that sent pyroclastic flows over a wide area.

== Eruptions ==
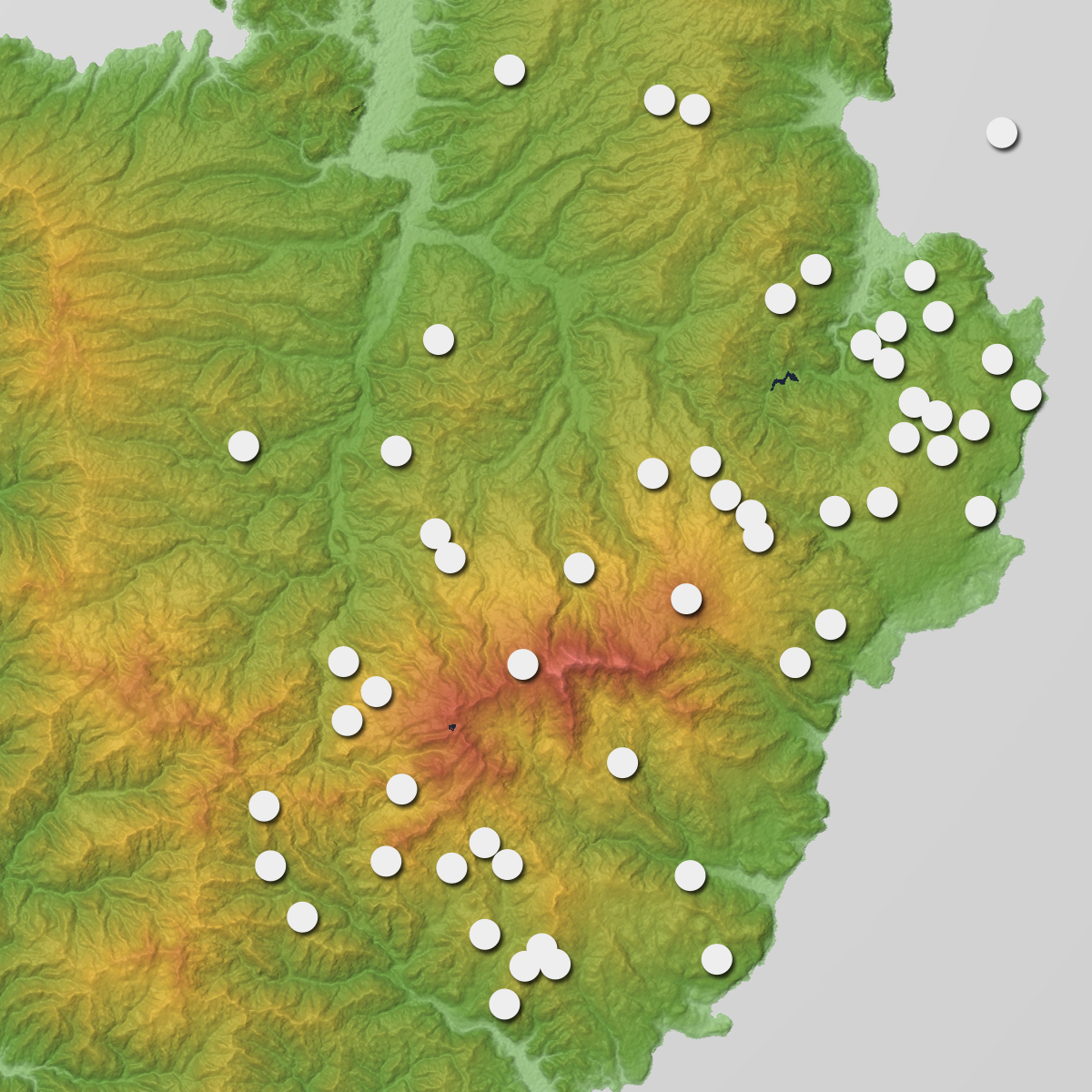
Distribution map

=== 1989 eruption ===
The only recorded eruption was an event on 13 July 1989. Two earthquakes, on 30 June and 9 July took, place on the Izu-Tobu Volcano. On 13 July, a seismometer recorded seismicity, a research vessel, the RV Takuyo reported hearing an explosion sound from the sea floor followed by a 30-second vibration at 18:33 pm. At 18:40 pm the crew reported that the sea domed up 500 m from the vessel, then a grey-black plume rose from the area, five more domes were reported in the next 5 minutes which caused the ship to vibrate. After that seismicity declined.

This marks the only known eruptive activity at Izu-Tobu. The next day a survey using an unmanned vessel discovered a new cone 100 metres underwater. The cone was around 450 Metres wide with a summit crater 200 m in diameter. The height of the cone above the sea floor was only 10 m in height.

The University of Tokyo monitors Izu-Tobu 24 hours a day.

== Distinct cones ==
Image	Name	Location	Type	Height	Eruption	Coordinates	Comments
	Mount Ōmuro (大室山)	Itō	Cinder cone	580 m	4 ka	34.9031°N 139.0945°E	Lava flow formed the Jōgasaki coast.
(Right)	Mount Komuro (小室山)	Itō	Cinder cone	321 m	15 ka	34.9391°N 139.131°E	
	Mount Io (伊雄山)	Itō	Cinder cone	459 m	2.7 ka	34.8717°N 139.0795°E	
	Mount Tōgasa (遠笠山)	Izu and Higashizu	Cinder cone	1,197 m	14 ka - 15 ka	34.8786°N 139.0325°E	Oldest volcano in Izu-Tobu volcano field
	Kawagodaira (皮子平)	Izu	Volcanic crater	approx. 1,090 m	3.2 ka	34.860°N 138.982°E	
	Mount Maruno (丸野山)	Izu	Cinder cone	697 m	107 ka	34.911°N 139.024°E	
	Mount Sukumo (巣雲山)	Izu	Cinder cone	581 m	132 ka	35.005°N 139.037°E	
	Mount Hachikubo (鉢窪山)	Izu	Cinder cone	674 m	17 ka	34.862°N 138.929°E	Lava flow from Mount Hachikubo formed Jōren Falls.
	Mount Maru (丸山)	Izu	Cinder cone	938 m	17 ka	34.855°N 138.939°E	
	Mount Takatsuka (高塚山)	Izunokuni	Cinder cone	369 m	132 ka	35.0165°N 138.98°E	Cinder cone was halved by quarrying.
	Mount Hachino (鉢ノ山)	Kawazu	Cinder cone	619 m	36 ka	34.793°N 138.971°E	
(Left)	Mount Yahazu (矢筈山)	Itō	Lava dome	816 m	2.7 ka	34.895°N 139.057°E	
(Right)	Mount Anano (孔ノ山)	Itō	Lava dome	660 m	2.7 ka	34.9°N 139.053°E	
	Mount Iwano (岩ノ山)	Izu	Lava dome	602 m	2.7 ka	34.913°N 139.039°E	
	Ippeki lake (一碧湖)	Itō	Maar	Surface elevation 185 m	103.5 ka	34.93°N 139.105°E	
	Jōgasaki coast (城ヶ崎海岸)	Itō	Lava flow	-	4 ka	34.89°N 139.138°E	This coast was mostly formed by lava flow from Mount Ōmuro.
	Teishi knoll (手石海丘)	Sagami Sea (off Itō)	Volcanic crater	81 m below sea level	13 July 1989	34.985°N 139.118889°E	Youngest volcano in Izu-Tobu volcano field. Eruption video by Japan Coast Guard

== See also ==
- List of volcanoes in Japan
- List of mountains in Japan
