= Hōei eruption =

Last major eruption of Mount Fuji (1707–08)

Hōei eruption 宝永大噴火
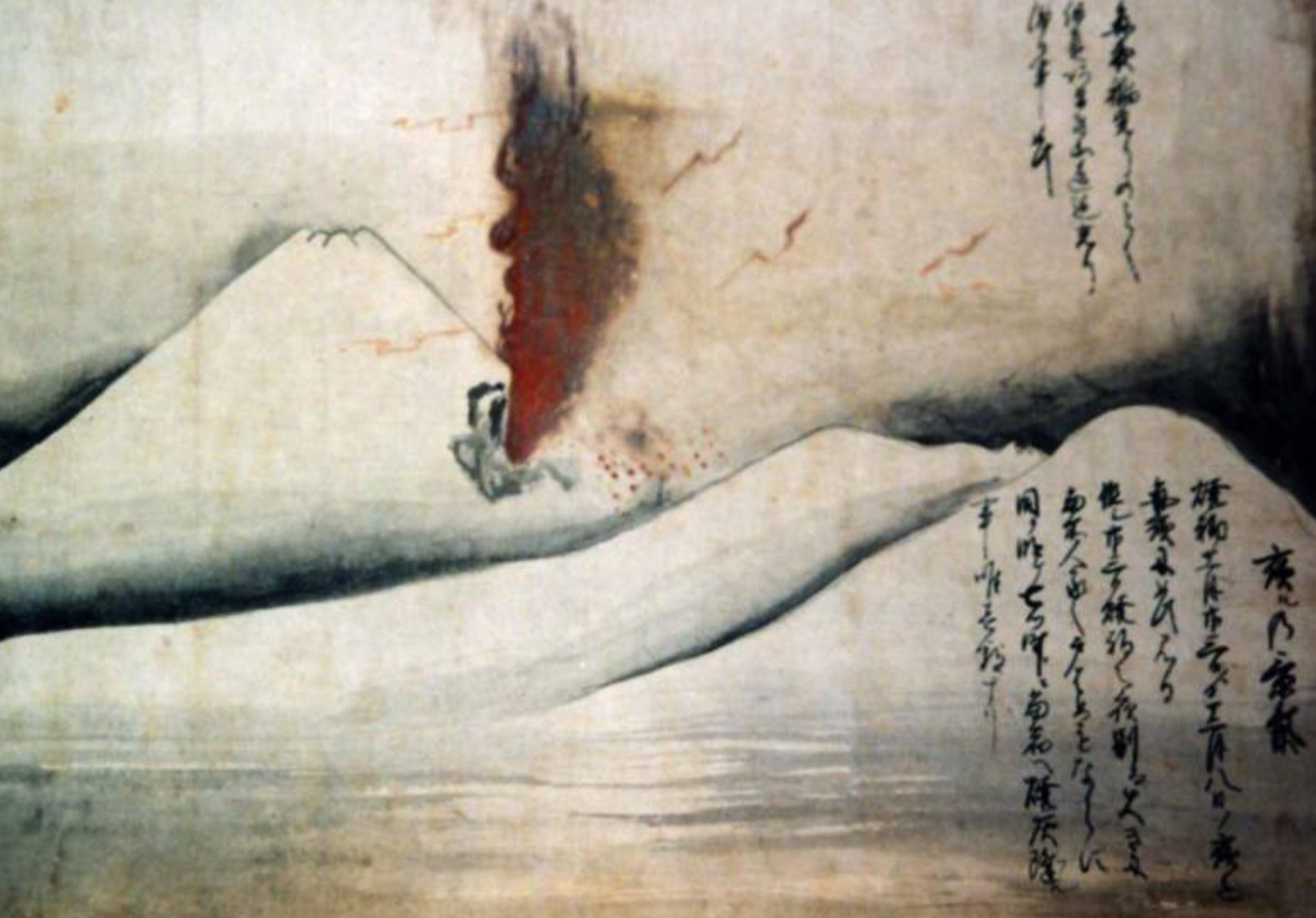
- Volcano: Mount Fuji
- Start date: December 16, 1707
- End date: February 24, 1708
- Type: Plinian eruption
- Location: Chūbu region, Honshu, Japan; 35.3580°N 138.7310°E
- VEI: 5

Maps
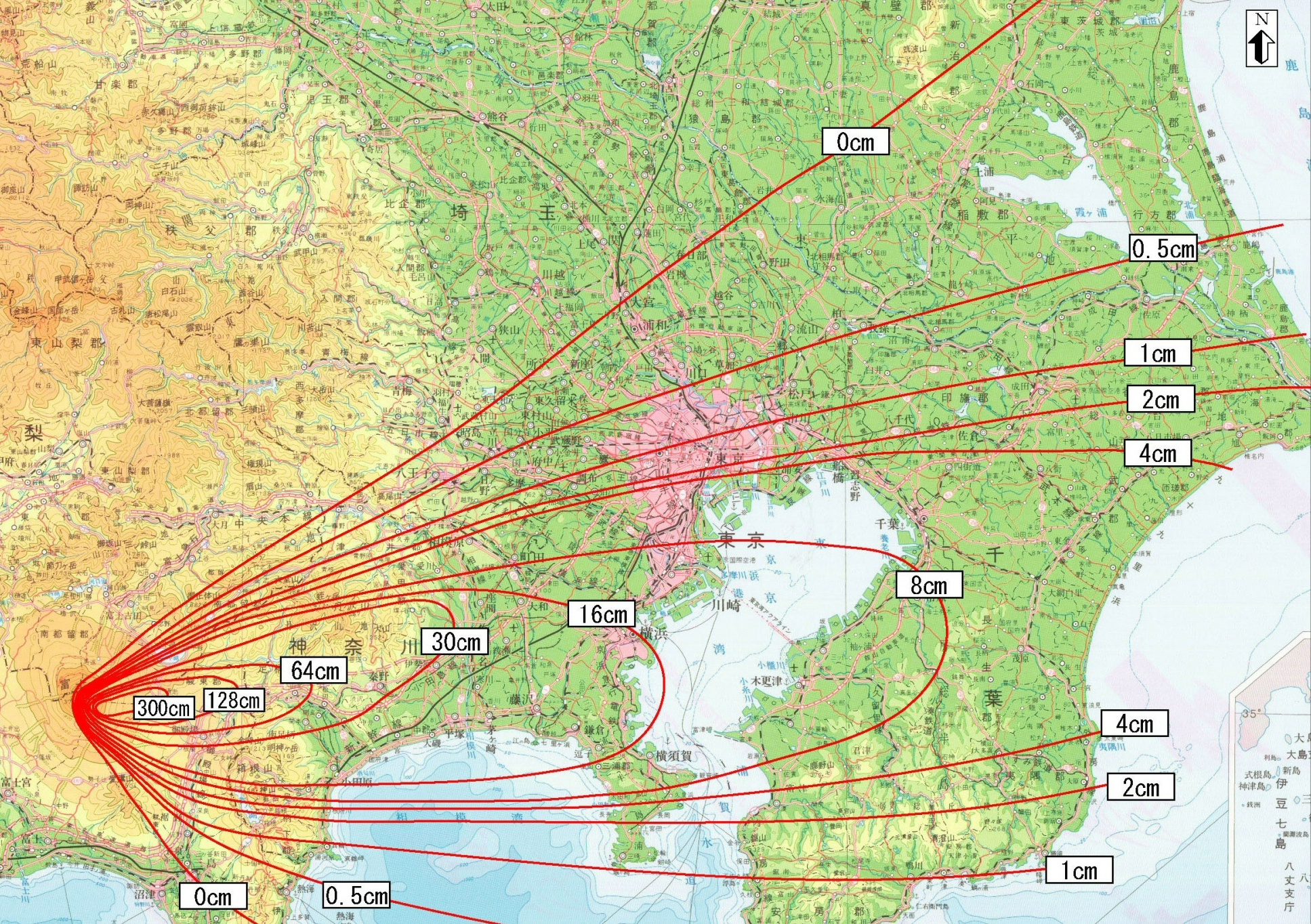
- Map of volcanic ash fall during the Hōei eruption

The Hōei eruption (Japanese: 宝永大噴火, Hōei daifunka) of Mount Fuji started on December 16, 1707 (during the Hōei era, 23rd day of the 11th month of the 4th year) and ended on February 24, 1708. It was the last confirmed eruption of Mount Fuji, with three unconfirmed eruptions reported from 1708 to 1854. The eruption took place during the reign of Emperor Higashiyama and the Shogun was Tokugawa Tsunayoshi. It is well known for the immense ash-fall it produced over eastern Japan and subsequent landslides and starvation across the country. Hokusai's One Hundred Views of Mount Fuji includes an image of the small crater at a secondary eruption site on the southwestern slope. The area where the eruption occurred is called Mount Hōei because it occurred in the fourth year of the Hōei era. Today, the crater of the main eruption can be visited from the Fujinomiya or Gotemba Trails on Mount Fuji.

== Extent ==
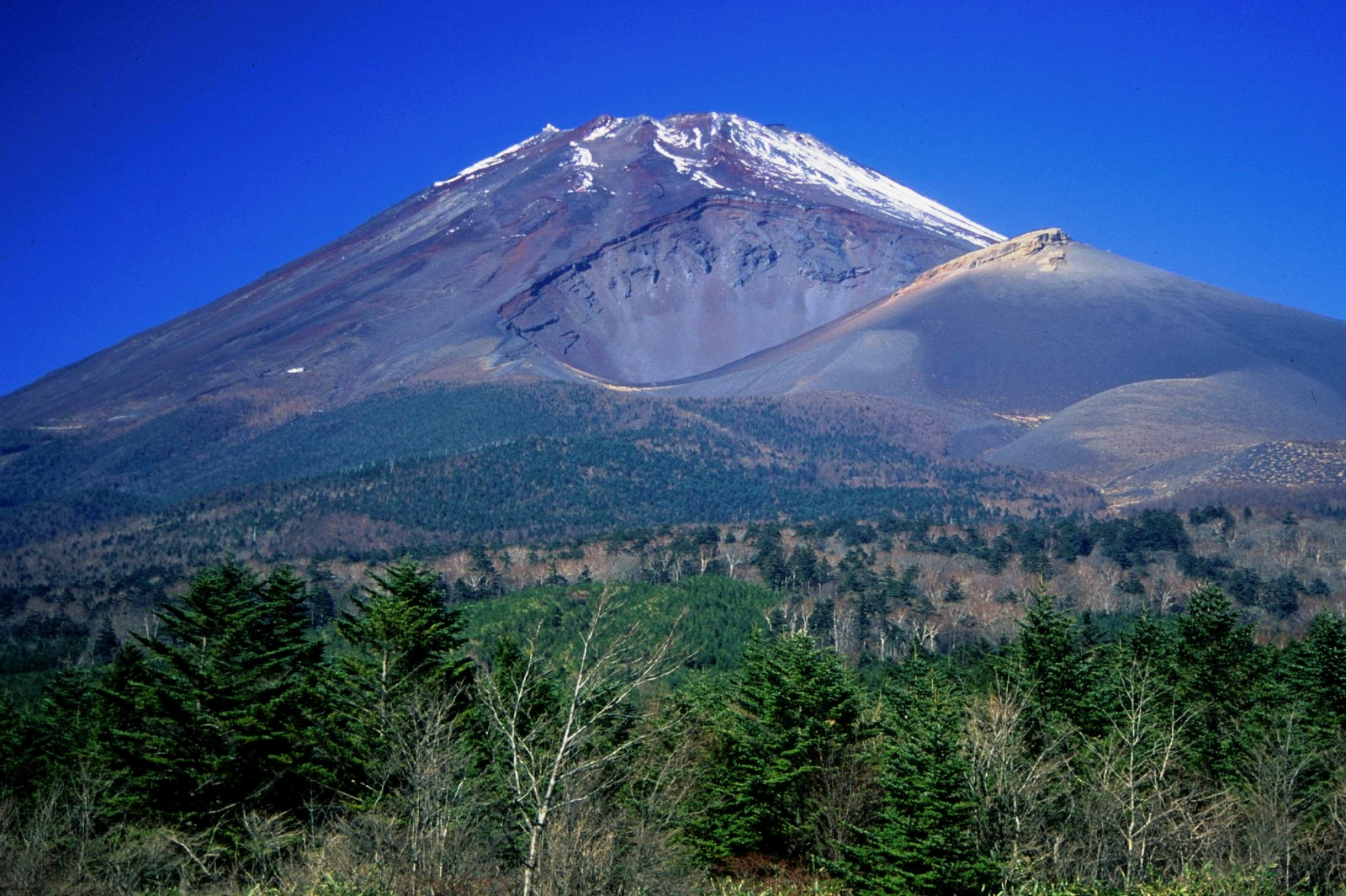
Mount Fuji, showing the Hōei crater

Three years before the eruption, rumbling began in 1704 from February 4 to 7. One to two months prior to the eruption, earthquakes could be felt around the base of the volcano with magnitudes reaching as high as 5. Because of the short time between the earthquake and eruption, these events have been linked. The event was characterized as a Plinian eruption, with pumice, scoria, and ash shot into the stratosphere and raining down far east of the volcano. It has been classified as an explosive eruption. Lahars soon followed the eruption because of heavy rainfall and flooding in the area. It is suggested that two types of magma, silicic and basaltic magma, mixed together as a result of the earthquake.

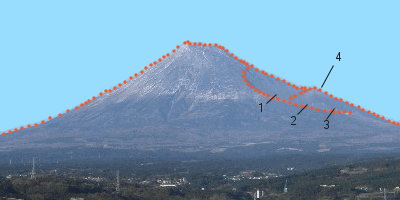
Vent locations on Mount Fuji

The eruption happened on Mount Fuji's east-southeast flank and formed three new volcanic vents, named No. 1, No. 2, and No. 3 Hōei vents. The catastrophe developed over several days; an initial earthquake with an explosion of cinders and ash was followed some days later with more forceful ejections of rocks and stones. The Hōei eruption is said to have caused the worst ash-fall disaster in Japanese history.

Although it brought no lava flow, the Hōei eruption released 800 million cubic meters (28×10^{9} cu ft) of volcanic ash, which spread over vast areas around the volcano, even reaching Edo almost 100 kilometers (60 mi) away. Cinders and ash fell like rain in Izu, Kai, Sagami, and Musashi provinces, and ash-fall was also recorded in Yokohama to the east of the volcano. In Edo, the volcanic ash was several centimeters thick. The released ash from the eruption fell to the earth and covered many crops in the area, stunting growth. There is no estimate for the number of deaths caused by the eruption. The eruption is rated a 5 on the Volcanic Explosivity Index.

== Effect on local population ==
The eruption had a disastrous effect on the people living in the Fuji region. The tephra released from the volcano caused an agricultural decline, leading many in the Fuji area to die of starvation. Volcanic ash fell and widely covered the cultivated fields east of Mount Fuji. To recover the fields, farmers cast volcanic products out to dumping grounds making piles. The rain washed material from the dumping grounds into the rivers and made some of the rivers shallower, especially the Sakawa River, into which huge volumes of ash fell, resulting in temporary dams. Heavy rainfall in August 1708 caused an avalanche of volcanic ash and mud, breaking the dams and flooding the Ashigara plain.

Many of the casualties caused by the Hōei eruption were due to flooding, landslides, and famine following the event. The crops began to fail when the released ash descended upon the fields, leading to widespread starvation in the Edo (renamed Tokyo in 1869) area. Debris that included large rocks, floodwater, and ash, restricted relocation which led to further casualties from hunger in the Edo area.

== Cause ==
It is hypothesized that the Hōei eruption was caused by two earthquakes, namely the 1703 Genroku earthquake and the 1707 Hōei earthquake. The Genroku earthquake was a magnitude 8.2 M_{s}, that took place at the Sagami Trough. The Hōei earthquake was a magnitude 8.6 M_{L} or 8.7M_{w} that occurred at the Nankai Trough and was followed by the Hōei eruption 49 days later. The Genroku quake was the largest to happen at the Sagami Trough and contributed to the eruption. The Hōei quake caused stress and compression of the magma chambers underneath Mount Fuji, leading to the eruption.

A dike system stretches from the surface of Mount Fuji to 20 km into the subsurface. At 8 km depth, there are magma chambers of a dacitic and andesitic nature while at the deepest portion of the dike, a basaltic melt is located. The dike acts as a conduit for the magma chambers to reach the surface. The Genroku event caused a change in the normal stress acting on the dike system which had the effect of clasping the dike as well as the melts. The magma chambers were compressed, and the dike was buckled, trapping the melts. The Hōei earthquake allowed the magma to force its way to the surface.

The Hōei earthquake similarly affected the dike system as the Genruko quake in the sense that there were normal stress changes and buckling of the dike. The normal stress was increased in the upper segment (8 km in depth) of the dike, clasping it. This forced the dacitic and andesitic magmas to remain in place. However, the southeastern portion of the dike which remained clamped by the Genruko quake was unbuckled by the reduced normal stress in that area by the Hōei earthquake. This allowed for the basaltic melt, which was still being compressed, to rise and mix with the trapped dacitic and andesitic melts. This caused magma expansion by the "vesiculation" of the mixed magma, allowing it to travel to the surface.

It seems that the dilatation of the magma reservoir can cause gas bubbles to rise with the melt allowing more depressurization to occur. Thus, producing the Hōei eruption. However, since the eruption occurred 49 days after the earthquake, it is likely that other mechanisms occurred prior to the eruption, such as the melt ''mixing thorough sloshing.''

== Tectonic setting and the threat of more eruptions ==
Japan is located in the most geologically active region of Earth, called the Ring of Fire. This region is known for its many volcanic eruptions and earthquakes. Mount Fuji is located in the middle of three colliding tectonic plates, the Eurasian Plate, Okhotsk microplate, and Philippine Sea plate, resulting in the history of high geologic activity.

Based on the internal pressure inside the volcano that scientists measured in 2012, speculation of a possible eruption is high. There have been many earthquakes since the 1707 Hōei earthquake, with some minor activity in the 1980s, in 2000 and 2001, and the major but more distant Tohoku earthquake in 2011. After the activity observed in 2000, magma has been found to be collecting under the volcano. Damage is estimated to cost Japan over US$25 billion if another eruption were to occur. It is assumed that, much like the 1707 Hōei eruption, the volcano would almost certainly erupt at the same vent where the previous eruption occurred.

A repeat of the 1707 Hōei eruption may impact over 30 million people in the highly populated areas of eastern Tokyo, Kanagawa, Chiba and parts of Yamanashi, Saitama, and Shizuoka. The volcano would most heavily affect Tokyo and would likely cause power outages, water shortages, and malfunctions in the highly technical city. Mount Fuji has more than 20 seismic activity stations monitoring any movement in the ground. It is impossible to determine when the next eruption will occur, but it will most likely erupt soon because of its long dormancy time.

== See also ==
- Historic eruptions of Mount Fuji
