= Mount Ōmuro (Mount Fuji) =

Mountain in Japan

- 大室山
- Mount Ōmuro and Mount Fuji as seen from Lake Shōji

Highest point
- Elevation: 1,468 m (4,816 ft)
- Coordinates: 35°26′27″N 138°39′13″E

Geography
- Location: Fujikawaguchiko, Minamitsuru District, Yamanashi Prefecture

Geology
- Last eruption: about 3300 years ago

Mount Ōmuro (大室山, Ōmuroyama) is a mountain located at the northwestern foot of Mount Fuji, in Fujikawaguchiko, Minamitsuru District, Yamanashi Prefecture.

It is one of the many extinct volcanoes of Mount Fuji, and because it is located at the gentle foot of Mount Fuji, it looks like an independent peak. There is a crater depression at the top. It is located on the south side of Aokigahara, and is dotted with wind holes such as Motosu Wind Cave, Omuro Wind Cave, and Kamukura Wind Cave. There is no mountain trail to Mt. Omuro, and the top is surrounded by forests and the view is poor. In addition, since it is designated as a wildlife sanctuary and national park special protected area, the collection of insects and wildflowers is prohibited.

A common viewing spot of Mount Omuro is Lake Shoji, from which Mount Fuji appears to loom over and surround it. This view has earned it the nickname "Kodaki-Fuji", or “Fuji Cradling a Child", referring to the two mountains as parent and child.
