= Hōei =

Period of Japanese history (1704–1711)

Hōei (宝永; Kyujitai: 寶永) was a Japanese era name (年号, nengō; "year name") after Genroku and before Shōtoku. This period spanned the years from March 1704 through April 1711. The reigning emperors were Higashiyama (東山天皇) and Nakamikado (中御門天皇).

== Etymology ==
Hōei comes from the Old Book of Tang (寶祚惟永、暉光日新).

== Change of era ==
- 1704 Hōei gannen (宝永元年): In reaction to the Great Genroku earthquake in Genroku 16, the era name was changed to Hōei (meaning "Prosperous Eternity"). The previous era ended and the new one commenced in Genroku 17, on the 13th day of the 3rd month.

== Events of the Hōei era ==
- October 28, 1707 (Hōei 4, 4th day of the 10th month): Great Hōei earthquake. The city of Osaka suffers tremendously because of a very violent earthquake.
- December 16, 1707 (Hōei 4, 23rd day of the 11th month): An eruption of Mount Fuji; the cinders and ash fell like rain in Izu, Kai, Sagami, and Musashi.
- April 28, 1708 (Hōei 5, 8th day of the 3rd month): There was a great fire in Heian-kyō.
- May 20, 1708 (Hōei 5, 1st day of the 4th month): The shogunate introduces new copper coins into circulation; and each coin is marked with the Hōei nengō name (Hōei Tsubo).
- October 12, 1708 (Hōei 5, 29th day of the 8th month): Italian missionary Giovanni Sidotti landed in Yakushima, where he was promptly arrested.
- February 19, 1709 (Hōei 6, 10th day of the 1st month): The wife of shōgun Tokugawa Tsunayoshi killed him with a knife, and then she stabbed herself in the heart. Tsunayoshi's plan to adopt daimyō of Kai as his successor were known by a few inside Edo Castle. The shōgun's wife, who was also a daughter of the emperor, foresaw that this choice of a successor would be very poorly received by many; and she feared that it might result in a disastrous civil war. The shōgun's wife did everything she could to dissuade Tsunayoshi from continuing with such potentially divisive and dangerous plans; and when it became clear that her arguments were in vain, she resolutely sacrificed herself for the good of the country—she killed her husband and then killed herself. She may also have done this as she hated the boy. (Note: Text: Dans la 6° année (1709), le 10 jour du 1er mois, l'épouse du Seogoun Tsouna yosi le tua à coups de poignard et se perça ensuite le cœur. Ce prince, adonné au vice contre nature et n'ayant pas d'enfans, avait jeté les yeux sur le prince de Kaï pour l'adopter et pour en faire son successeur. L'impératrice, qui était une des filles du Daïri, prévoyant que ce choix révolterait tous les princes, et qu'il était à craindre qu'il ne s'ensuivît une révolution dans l'empire, mit tout en œuvre pour le dissuader de sa résolution. Ce ne fut que quand elle vit que ses représentations étaient vaines qu'elle le sacrifia à la tranquillité menacée de l'empire. C'est pour cette raison que la mémoire de cette princesse est encore aujourd'hui révérée dans tout le Japon.)
- 1709 (Hōei 6, 4th month): Minamoto no Ienobu, Tsunayoshi's nephew, becomes the 6th shōgun of the Edo bakufu.
- August 7, 1709 (Hōei 6, 2nd day of the 7th month): The Emperor abdicates.
- January 16, 1710 (Hōei 6, 17th day of the 12th month): Higashiyama dies.
- July 7, 1710 – March 22, 1711 (Hōei 7, 11th day of the 6th month – Shōtoku 1, 4th day of the 2nd month): Ryukyuan mission to Edo, the largest delegation—168 people—in the Edo Period.

== Gallery ==
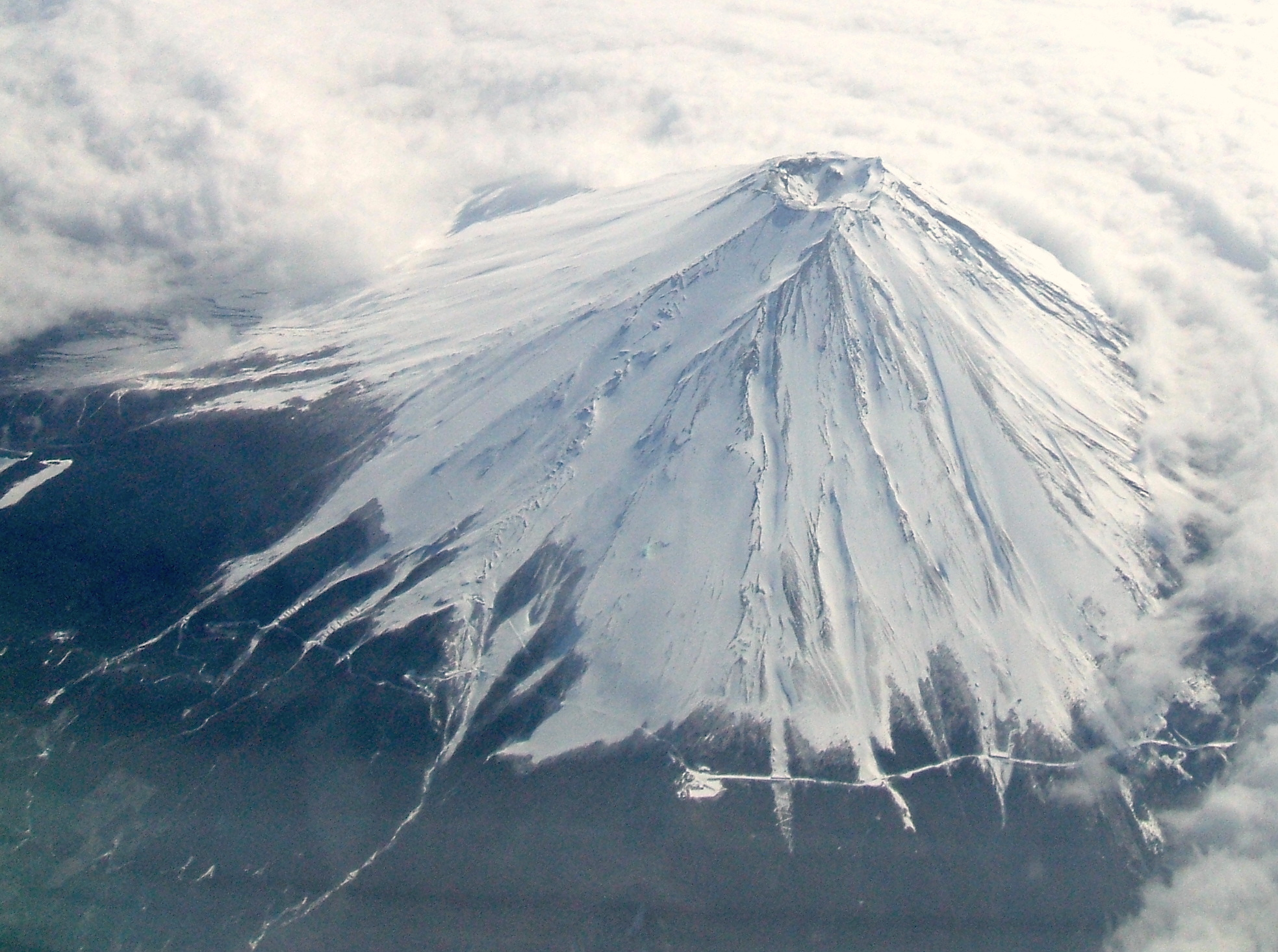
Looking down towards the peak of Mount Fuji and its central crater.

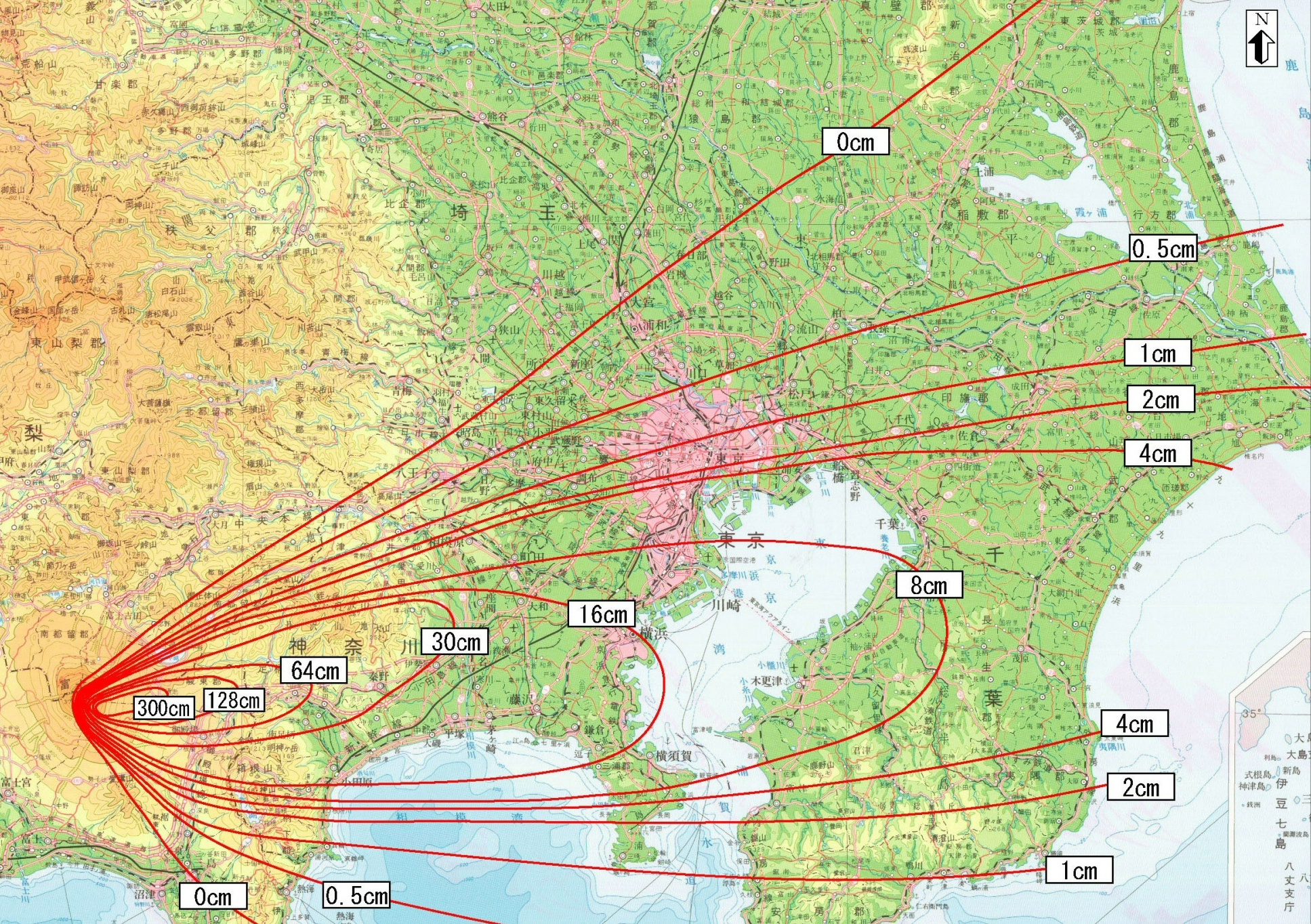
Distribution of volcanic cinders and ash falling across central Honshū after the eruption of Mount Fuji in 1707 (Hoei 4).

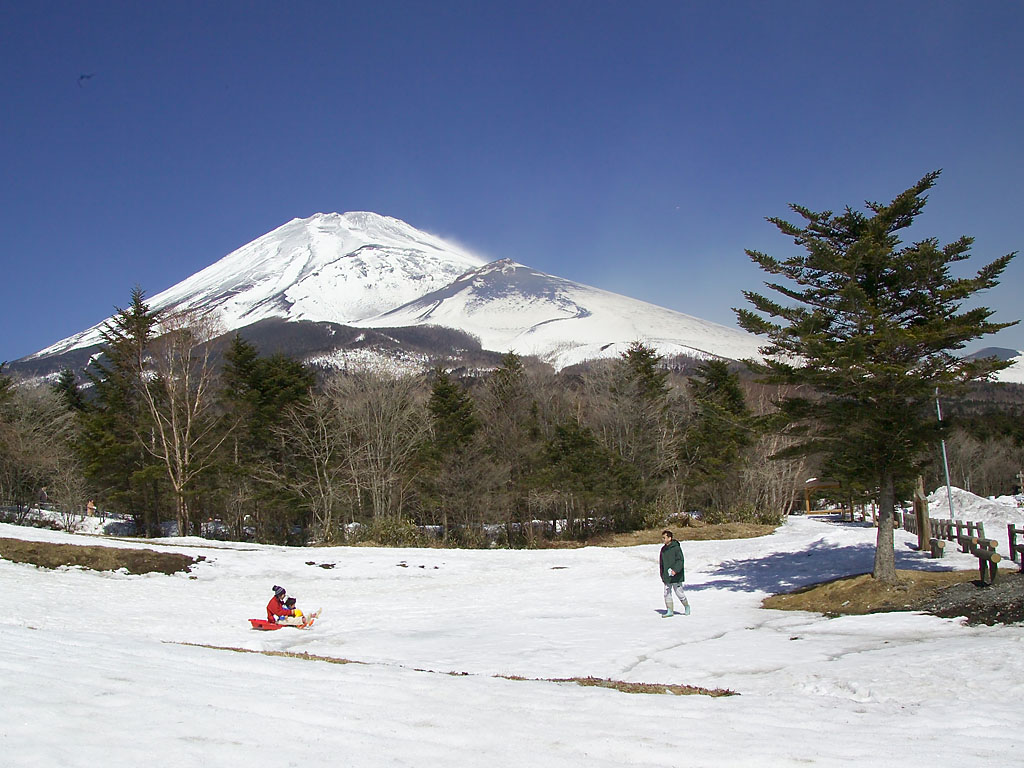
The Hoei Crater, visible to the right of the peak of Mount Fuji, was the location of the 1707 eruption that spewed ash as far as Edo.

== See also ==
- Hōei eruption of Mount Fuji
- Historic eruptions of Mount Fuji

== Notes ==
Preceded by Genroku (元禄)	Era or nengō Hōei (宝永); 1704–1711	Succeeded by Shōtoku (正徳)
