= Mount Ōmuro (Shizuoka) =

Cinder cone volcano in Japan

- 大室山
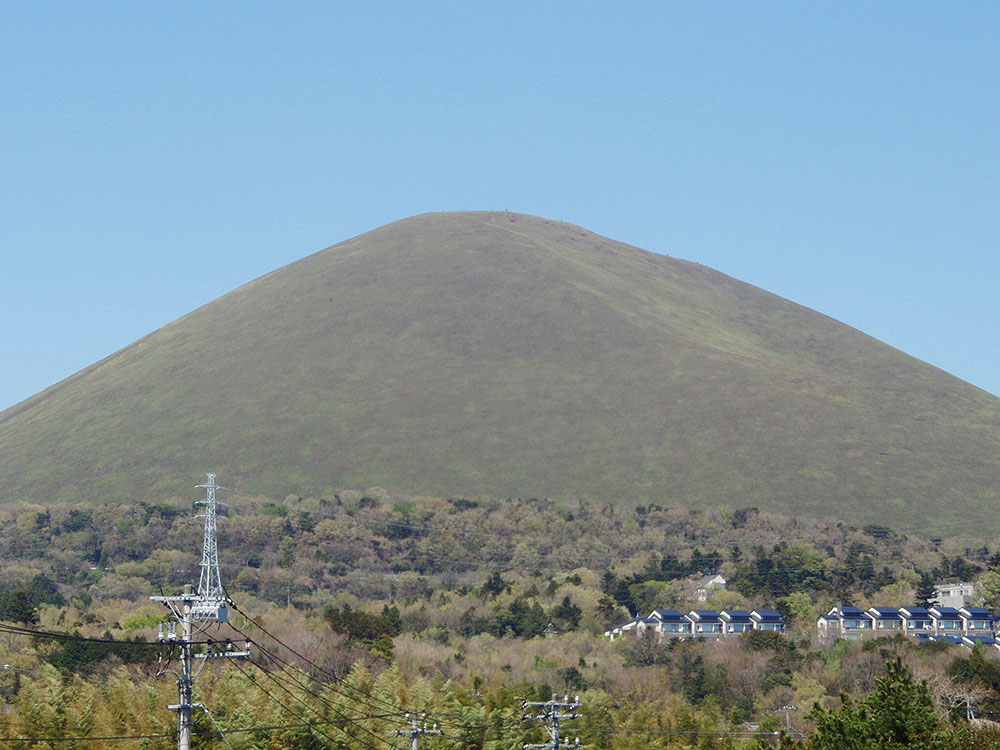
- Mount Ōmuro seen from the west.

Highest point
- Elevation: 580 m (1,900 ft)
- Coordinates: 34°54′11″N 139°5′40″E

Geography
- Location within Japan
- Location: Itō, Shizuoka Prefecture, Japan

Geology
- Mountain type: Cinder cone
- Last eruption: about 4000 years ago

Mount Ōmuro (大室山, Ōmuroyama) is a 580 m (1,900 ft)-high cinder cone volcano in the Izu-Tobu volcano field of Itō, Shizuoka, Japan. At the independent peak, the yearly mountain burning that has been performed for more than 700 years is carried out in the early spring, so it is often covered with annual plants and is a symbol of Itō. The mountain is designated as a national natural monument and part of Fuji-Hakone-Izu National Park.

== Gallery ==
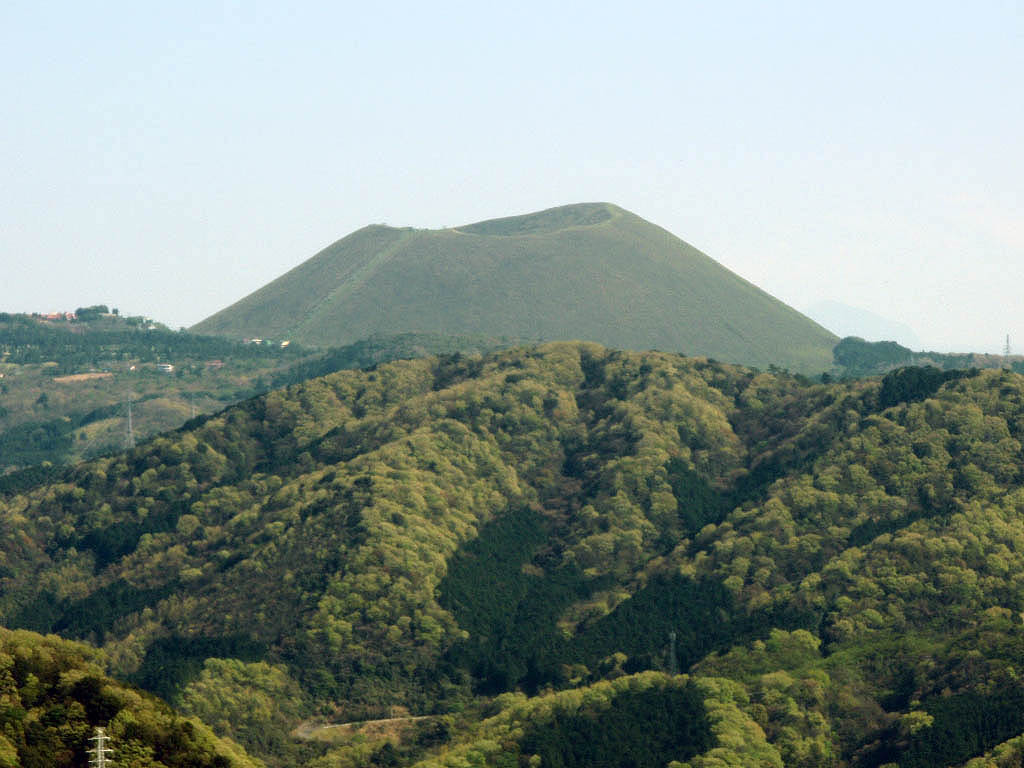
From the northwest.

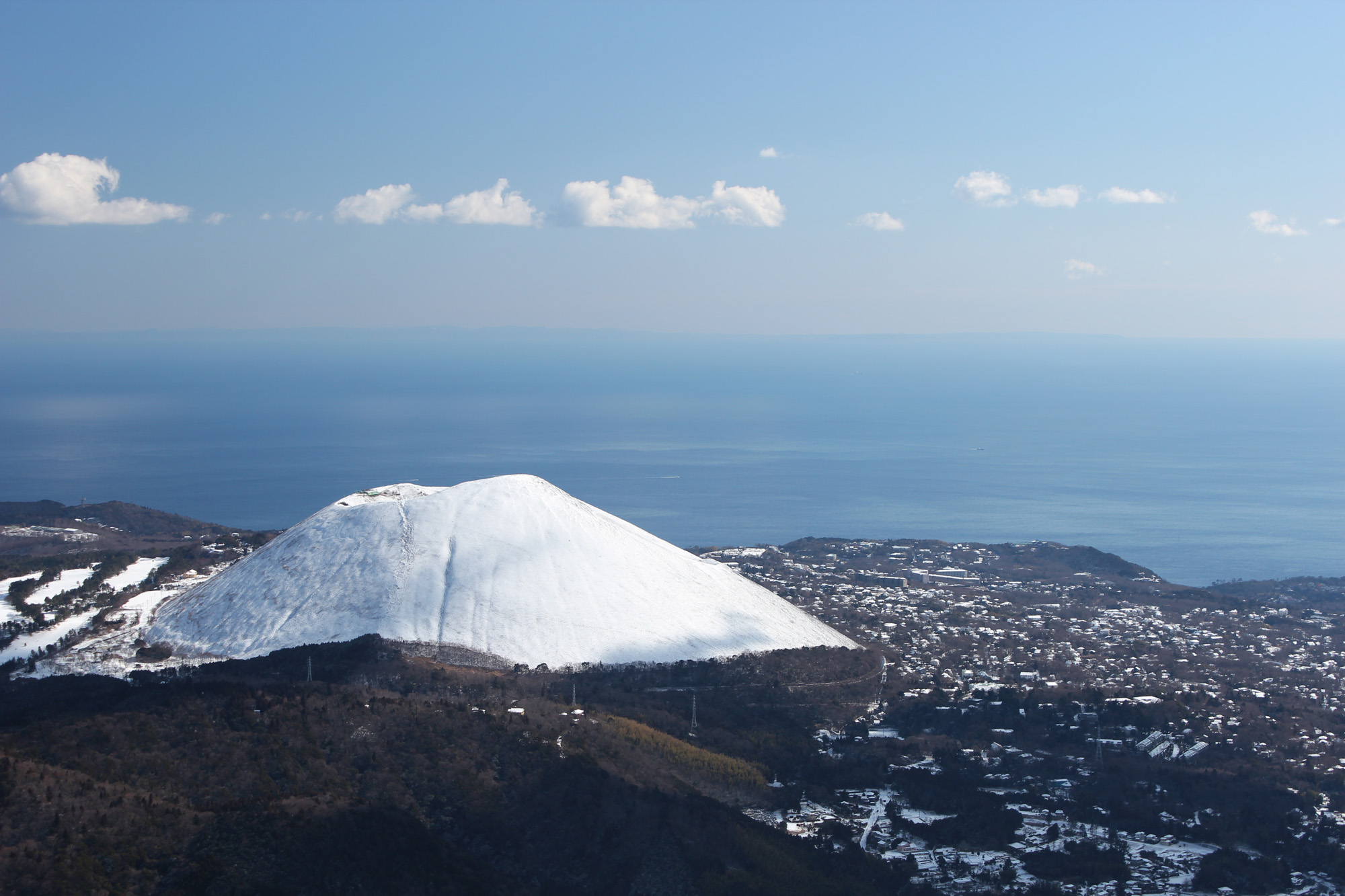
Symbolic pyroclastic cone of the Izu-Tobu volcano field.

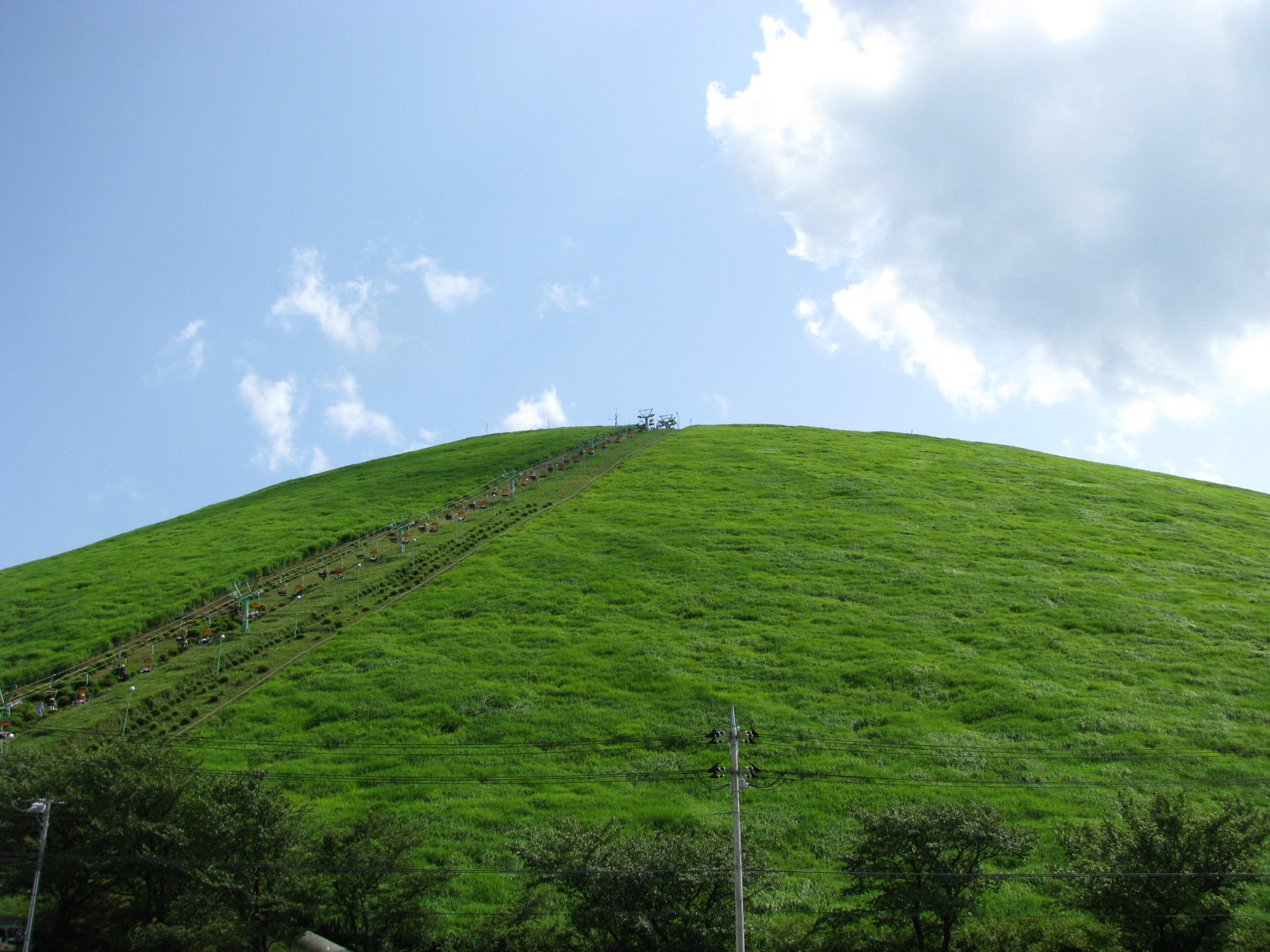
Looking up from the north foot.
