= Yonezuka Kofun Cluster =

Kofun period burial mound cluster in Shizuoka, Japan

Yonezuka Kofun cluster
- 米塚古墳群 (Japanese)
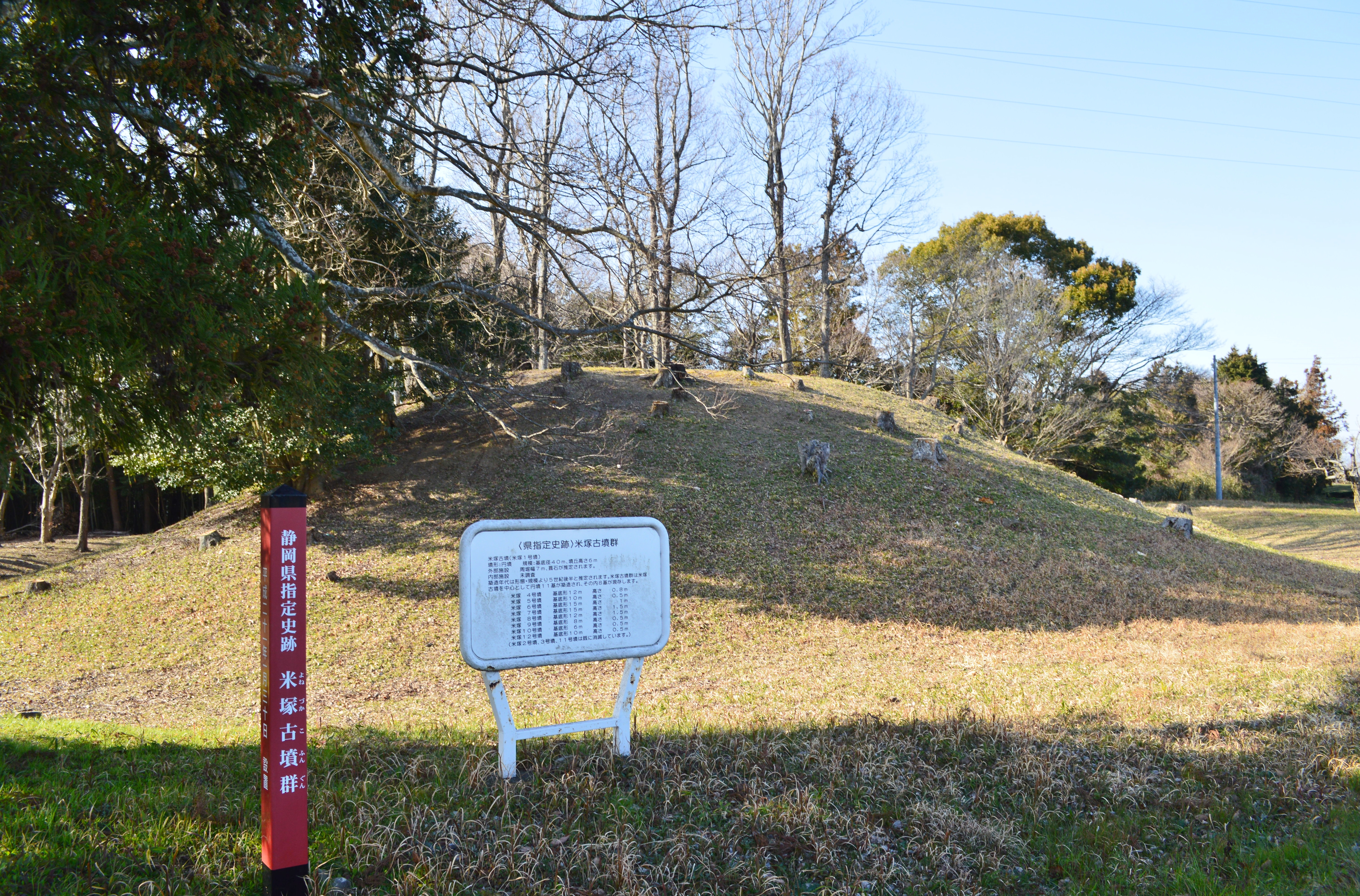
- Yonezuka Kofun No.1

- Yonezuka Kofun cluster Yonezuka Kofun Cluster (Japan)
- 34°47′09.21″N 137°50′26.08″E
- Type: Kofun cluser
- Periods: Kofun period
- Location: Iwata, Shizuoka, Japan
- Region: Tōkai region

History
- Built: late 5th century

Site notes
- Public access: Yes (no facilities)
- Shizuoka Prefecture Historic Site

The Yonezuka Kofun cluster (米塚古墳群) is a group of middle Kofun period (late 5th century) enpun (円墳)-style round burial mounds, located in the Fujikanbara neighborhood of the city of Iwata, Shizuoka in the Tōkai region of Japan. Eight of the nine surviving kofun in the tumulus cluster were collectively designated a Shizuoka Prefecture Historic Site in 1979.

== Overview ==
The Yonezuka Kofun cluster is a group of burial mounds was constructed on the western edge of the Iwatabara Plateau, at an elevation of 100 meters on the east bank of the Tenryū River in western Shizuoka Prefecture. The location is approximately 450 meters north of the Teradani Chōshizuka Kofun, which is a National Historic Site. The cluster consisted of twelve circular burial mounds, nine of which still exist. excavations of Kofun No. 2 and No. 3 (both now destroyed) were conducted in 1969.

The largest of the burial mounds, Kofun No. 1 (also called the "Yonezuka Kofun"), is a large circular burial mound measuring 40 meters in diameter and 6 meters in height, constructed in two tiers. While it is possible that the surface of the mound was covered with fukiishi revetment stones, no haniwa clay figures have been found . A moat seven meters wide surrounds the mound. The burial facilities are unclear as they have not been investigated. The construction period is estimated to be around the latter half of the 5th century, during the middle of the Kofun period. Of the two tumuli, Kofun No. 2 (16.5-meters in diameter) and Kofun No. 3 (30-meters in diameter), which have been excavated, grave goods including beads, silver rings, iron arrowheads, horse trappings, Sue ware, and Haji ware pottery were discovered in Kofun No. 3. The surrounding burial mounds are smaller, approximately 10 meters in diameter and one meter in height, and are thought to date from the late Kofun period.

Yonezuka Kofun cluster
Name	Type	Size	Notes
Kofun No.1 （Yonezuka Kofun）	Enpun	40m	
Kofun No.2	Enpun	16.5m	Excavated 1969 no longer exists
Kofun No.3	Enpun	20m	Excavated 1969 no longer exists
Kofun No.4	Enpun	12m	
Kofun No.5	Enpun	10m	
Kofun No.6	Enpun	15m	
Kofun No.7	Enpun	15m	
Kofun No.8	Enpun	12m	
Kofun No.9	Enpun	8m	
Kofun No.10	Enpun	6m	
Kofun No.11			no longer exists
Kofun No.12	Enpun	10m	

== See also ==
- List of Historic Sites of Japan (Shizuoka)
