= Shinpōinyama Kofun group =

- 新豊院山古墳群 (Japanese)
- Shinpōinyama Kofun Shinpōinyama Kofun group (Japan)
- 34°46′16″N 137°52′26″E
- Type: kofun
- Periods: Kofun period
- Location: Iwata, Shizuoka, Japan
- Region: Tōkai region

History
- Built: 4th century AD

Site notes
- Public access: Limited (no public facilities)

The Shinpōinyama Kofun group (新豊院山古墳群, Shinpōinyama kofun-gun) is cluster of kofun burial mounds dating from the late Yayoi to the early Kofun period located in the Mukasatakenouchi neighborhood of the city of Iwata, Shizuoka in the Tōkai region of Japan. The site was designated a National Historic Site of Japan in 1987.

== Overview ==
The Shinpōinyama Kofun group is located on a low hill at the confluence of the Tenryū River with the Ota River on the eastern edge of the Iwatabara plateau. The necropolis consists of over 30 tumuli in various styles, which were arbitrarily divided into Group A through Group D by archaeologists. Due to construction work, Group D was excavated in 1980. It was found to contain two keyhole-shaped tumuli (zenpō-kōen-fun (前方後円墳)) and one square tumulus (hōfun (方墳)) from the Kofun period and three graves from the earlier Yayoi period, along with a large amount of Yayoi pottery shards.

One of the keyhole-shaped tumuli, designated No.2, has a total length of 28 meters, with a posterior circular portion diameter of 17 meters and anterior rectangular portion width of 11 meters. It was constructed in the early 4th century based on excavated pottery, making it one of the oldest in the prefecture. The burial chamber is a pit-type stone chamber with alternate layers of clay and gravel, measuring 8.1 meters by 5.6 meters, containing a stone sarcophagus with a wooden coffin. Inside were numerous grave goods, including a bronze hammer, iron swords, and Chinese-made bronze mirror with a triangular rim and design of mythical animals, along with pottery from the early Kofun period. These items indicate a strong connection with the Kansai region.

Tumulus No.3 located to the west is the square tumulus, measuring 12 meters on each side. It was found to contain an iron sword and spear, around a wooden coffin, and Haji ware pottery from the end of the third century. The No.1 tumulus is another keyhole-shaped tumulus with a total length of 34 meters. It has not been excavated.

The site is a ten-minute walk from "Kasaume" bus stop on the Entetsu bus from Iwata Station, and us located on a hill behind a Buddhist temple, with limited public access.

== See also ==
- List of Historic Sites of Japan (Shizuoka)
