= List of historic sites of Japan (Shizuoka) =

This list is of the historic sites of Japan located within the Prefecture of Shizuoka.

== National Historic Sites ==
As of 1 August 2025, fifty Sites have been designated as being of national significance (including three *Special Historic Sites); the Joseon Mission Sites span the borders with Hiroshima and Okayama, Old Hakone Road and the site of the Stone Quarries for Edo Castle span the border with Kanagawa, and Mount Fuji spans the border with Yamanashi.

Site	Municipality	Comments	Image	Coordinates	Type	Ref.
*Tōtōmi Kokubun-ji 遠江国分寺跡; Tōtōmi Kokubunji ato	Iwata	Site of Nara-period Kokubun-ji for Tōtōmi Province		34°43′10″N 137°51′05″E	3	
*Arai Barrier Site 新居関跡; Arai-no-seki ato	Kosai	Only remaining barrier gate on the old Tōkaidō		34°41′41″N 137°33′41″E	6	
*Toro Site 登呂遺跡; Toro iseki	Suruga-ku, Shizuoka	Yayoi period settlement ruins		34°57′22″N 138°24′32″E	1	
Izu Kokubun-ji Pagoda Site 伊豆国分寺塔跡; Izu Kokubunji tō ato	Mishima	Ruins of Nara-period kokubun-ji for Izu Province		35°07′13″N 138°54′35″E	3	
Yokosuka Castle Site 横須賀城跡; Yokosuka-jō ato	Kakegawa	Edo-period castle ruins		34°41′09″N 137°58′15″E	2	
Ganjōju-in 願成就院跡; Ganjōju-in ato	Izunokuni	Kamakura-period temple with statues by Unkei		35°02′45″N 138°56′25″E	3	
Kikugawa fortification ruins 菊川城館遺跡群; Kikugawa-jōkan iseki-gun	Kikugawa	designation includes the sites of Takada Yashiki (高田大屋敷遺跡) and Yokoji Fortified Residence (横地氏城館跡)		34°43′22″N 138°04′36″E	2	
Kunōzan 久能山; Kunōzan	Suruga-ku, Shizuoka	Famed holy mountain, site of National Treasure Kunōzan Tōshō-gū		34°57′57″N 138°28′05″E	2,3	
Yasumiba ruins 休場遺跡; Yasumiba iseki	Numazu	Japanese Paleolithic settlement ruins		35°10′00″N 138°50′15″E	1	
Former Mitsuke School and Iwata Bunko 旧見付学校附磐田文庫 kyū-Mitsuke Gakkō tsuketari Iwata Bunko	Iwata	early Meiji period Giyōfū architecture		34°43′40″N 137°51′25″E	4	
Kōkokuji Castle ruins 興国寺城跡; Kōkoku-jō ato	Numazu	Sengoku-period Japanese castle ruins		35°08′30″N 138°48′24″E	2	
Gyokusen-ji 玉泉寺; Gyokusenji	Shimoda	Site of first American consulate in Japan		34°40′33″N 138°57′44″E	9	
Mikuriyama Kofun group 御厨古墳群; Mikuriyama Kofun-gun	Iwata	cluster of Kofun period burial tumuli		34°43′11″N 137°53′17″E	1	
Takatenjin Castle ruins 高天神城跡; Takaten-jō ato	Kakegawa	Sengoku-period Japanese castle ruins		34°41′55″N 138°02′08″E	2	
Mitake Castle ruins 三岳城跡; Mitake-jō ato	Hamamatsu	Muromachi period Japanese castle ruins		34°51′08″N 137°41′32″E	2	
Yamanaka Castle ruins 山中城跡; Yamanaka-jō ato	Mishima/Kannami	Heian, Kamakura period Japanese castle ruins		35°09′25″N 138°59′39″E	2	
Shida Gunga ruins 志太郡衙跡; Shida-gunga-ato	Fujieda	Ruins of Nara-period administrative structures		34°51′43″N 138°14′35″E	2	
Saioku-ji Gardens 柴屋寺庭園; Saiokuji teien	Suruga-ku, Shizuoka	also a Place of Scenic Beauty		34°57′22″N 138°19′59″E	3	
Ojima Jin'ya 小島陣屋跡; Ojima Jin’ya ato	Shimizu-ku, Shizuoka	Ruins of an Edo-period fortified daimyō residence		35°05′03″N 138°30′40″E	2	
Kamishiroiwa ruins 上白岩遺跡; Kamishiroiwa iseki	Izu	Jōmon period settlement ruins		34°57′48″N 138°59′03″E	1	
Shinpōinyama Kofun group 新豊院山古墳群; Shinpōinyama kofun-gun	Iwata	cluster of Kofun period burial tumuli		34°46′16″N 137°52′26″E	1	
Mikomotoshima Lighthouse 神子元島灯台; Mikomotojima tōdai	Shimoda	Meiji-period lighthouse, one of the first to be built in Japan		34°34′30″N 138°56′30″E	6	
Suwahara Castle ruins 諏訪原城跡; Suwahara-jō ato	Shimada	Segoku-period Japanese castle		34°49′04″N 138°07′08″E	2	
Sengo ruins 千居遺跡; Sengo iseki	Fujinomiya	Jōmon period settlement ruins		35°17′29″N 138°35′11″E	1	
Sengen Kofun 浅間古墳; Sengen kofun	Fuji	Kofun period burial tumulus		35°09′51″N 138°44′48″E	1	
Ōshikakubo ruins 大鹿窪遺跡; Ōshikakubo iseki	Fujinomiya	Jōmon period settlement ruins		35°14′55″N 138°33′43″E	1	
Ōchiwatoge temple ruins 大知波峠廃寺跡; Ōchiwatoge haiji-ato	Kosai	Heian period temple ruins		34°46′55″N 137°29′00″E	3	
Teradani Chōshizuka Kofun 銚子塚古墳附小銚子塚古墳; Chōshizuka Kofun tsuketari Ko-Chōshizuka Kofun	Iwata	Kofun period burial tumulus		34°46′49″N 137°50′21″E	1	
Nagahama Castle ruins 長浜城跡; Nagahama-jō ato	Numazu	Sengoku period Japanese castle ruins		35°01′05″N 138°53′18″E	2, 8	
Horigoe Gosho ruins 伝堀越御所跡 den-Horikgoe Gosho ato	Izunokuni	Muromachi period palace ruins		35°02′54″N 138°56′20″E	2	
Shimada-juku Ōigawa Ford Site 島田宿大井川川越遺跡; Shimada-juku Ōigawa kagoshi iseki	Shimada	Noted ford on the Tōkaidō highway		34°49′54″N 138°09′22″E	6	
Tōkaidō Utsunoya Pass 東海道宇津ノ谷峠越; Tōkaidō Utsunoya tōgegoe	Aoi-ku, Shizuoka-Fujieda	Remnant of Heian period Tōkaidō, at a location mentioned in courtly poetry		34°56′09″N 138°18′16″E	6	
Nirayama Reverberatory Furnace 韮山反射炉; Nirayama hansharo	Izunokuni	Bakumatsu-period industrial site		35°02′23″N 138°57′43″E	6	
Nirayama Daikansho 韮山代官所跡; Nirayama Daikansho-ato	Izunokuni	Edo period administrative offices for Izu Province		35°03′17″N 138°57′34″E	2	
Kashiya Cave Tombs 柏谷横穴群; Kashiya yokoana-gun	Kannami	Kofun-period necropolis		35°04′58″N 138°57′34″E	1	
Katayama temple ruins 片山廃寺跡; Katayama Haiji ato	Suruga-ku, Shizuoka	possible kokubun-ji of Suruga Province		34°57′51″N 138°25′35″E	3	
Kitaema Cave Tombs 北江間横穴群; Kitaema yokoana-gun	Izunokuni	Kofun period to early Nara period necropolis		35°03′17″N 138°55′13″E	1	
Enjō-ji Hōjō residence ruins (Enjō-ji ruins) 北条氏邸跡（円成寺跡） Hōjō-shi-tei (Enjō-ji ato)	Izunokuni	site of the Muromachi period residence of the Hōjō clan		35°02′48″N 138°56′14″E	1	
Ryōsen-ji 了仙寺; Ryōsenji	Shimoda	site of the signing of the 1858 Harris Treaty		34°40′20″N 138°56′30″E	9	
Wadaoka Kofun group 和田岡古墳群; Wadaoka kofun-gun	Kakegawa	cluster of Kofun period burial tumuli		34°46′40″N 137°57′06″E	1	
Shijimizuka site 蜆塚遺跡; Shijimiazuka iseki	Chūō-ku, Hamamatsu	Jōmon period Shell Mound		34°42′48″N 137°42′11″E	1	
Shizuhatagayama Kofun 賤機山古墳; Shizuhatayama kofun	Aoi-ku, Shizuoka	Kofun-period tumulus on grounds of Shizuoka Sengen Shrine		34°58′58″N 138°22′30″E	1	
Joseon Mission Sites 朝鮮通信使遺跡; Chōsen tsushinshi iseki	Shimizu-ku, Shizuoka	the designation includes Seiken-ji (清見寺), Fukuzen-ji (福禅寺) in Fukuyama, Hiroshima Prefecture, and Honren-ji (本蓮寺) in Setouchi, Okayama Prefecture		35°02′52″N 138°30′46″E	9	
Old Hakone Road 箱根旧街道; Hakone kyū-kaidō	Mishima, Kannami	stretch of the old Tōkaidō; the designation includes areas of Hakone in Kanagawa Prefecture		35°11′36″N 139°01′35″E	6	
Mount Fuji 富士山; Fujisan	Fujinomiya, Susono, Oyama	the designation includes areas of three municipalities in Yamanashi Prefecture; Mount Fuji is also a Special Place of Scenic Beauty and, as a component of the serial nomination Fujisan, sacred place and source of artistic inspiration, is inscribed on the UNESCO World Heritage List as a Cultural (rather than Natural) Site		35°30′36″N 138°44′46″E	3	
Futamata Castle ruins - Tobayama Castle ruins 二俣城跡及び鳥羽山城跡; Futamata-jō ato oyobi Tobayama-jō ato	Hamamatsu	Sengoku period castle ruins		34°51′43.29″N 137°48′32.16″E	2	
Stone Quarries for Edo Castle Site 江戸城石垣石丁場跡; Edo-jō ishigaki ishi-chōba ato	Atami, Itō	the designation includes an area of Odawara in Kanagawa Prefecture		35°01′20″N 139°05′12″E	6	
Kōmyōsan Kofun 光明山古墳; Kōmyōsan kofun	Hamamatsu	Kofun period tumulus		34°52′29″N 137°49′09″E	1	
Takaosan Kofun 高尾山古墳; Takaosan kofun	Numazu	Kofun period tumulus		35°07′23″N 138°51′40″E	1	
Nirayama Castle ruins 韮山城跡 附 付城跡; Nirayama-jō ato tsuketari tsuke-jiro ato	Izunokuni	Muromachi to Sengoku period castle ruins; designation includes the site of a secondary castle		35°03′13″N 138°57′20″E	2	

== Prefectural Historic Sites ==
As of 1 May 2024, thirty-five Sites have been designated as being of prefectural importance.

Site	Municipality	Comments	Image	Coordinates	Type	Ref.
Yonezuka Kofun Cluster 米塚古墳群; Yonezuka kofun-gun	Iwata			34°47′04″N 137°50′26″E		for all refs see
Chōja Yashiki Site 長者屋敷遺跡; Chōja yashiki iseki	Iwata			34°46′41″N 137°50′28″E		
Kawarakezuka Kofun 土器塚古墳; Kawarakezuka kofun	Iwata			34°43′11″N 137°50′37″E		
Senyō-ji Tō 撰要寺墓塔群; Senyōji haka-tō-gun	Kakegawa	forty-five tō		34°41′16″N 137°58′04″E		
Fukasawa Castle ruins 深沢城跡; Fukasawa-jō ato	Gotemba			35°19′26″N 138°57′21″E		
Miikedaira Kofun 三池平古墳; Miikedaira kofun	Shizuoka			35°03′11″N 138°28′50″E		
Shinmeizan Tumuli I and IV 神明山1号墳・神明山4号墳; Shinmeizan ichi-gō fun・Shinmeizan yon-gō fun	Shizuoka			35°02′30″N 138°29′07″E		
Kamishidoro Old Kiln Site 上志戸呂古窯跡; Kamishidoro ko-yōseki	Shimada			34°51′08″N 138°07′00″E		
Tōkaidō Kikugawa Cobblestones 東海道菊川坂石畳; Tōkaidō Kikugawa-saka ishidatami	Shimada			34°48′57″N 138°06′56″E		
Hakuin Ekaku Grave 白隠禅師墓; Hakuin zenshi haka	Numazu	at Shōin-ji (松蔭寺)		35°07′25″N 138°48′00″E		
Nagatsuka Kofun 長塚古墳; Nagatsuka Kofun	Numazu			35°07′43″N 138°51′26″E		
Numazu Western Shipyard and Lodgings of Yevfimy Putyatin 洋式帆船建造地及び艦長プチャーチン宿所 yōshiki hansen kenzōchi oyobi kanchō Puchāchin shukusho	Numazu			34°58′35″N 138°46′00″E		
Enoura Cave Tomb Cluster 江浦横穴群; Enoura yokoana-gun	Numazu			35°03′13″N 138°53′49″E		
Itasungō Kofun Cluster 井田松江古墳群; Itasungō kofun-gun	Numazu	twenty-three burials		34°59′49″N 138°46′42″E		
Aokozure Pass 青崩峠; Aokozure-tōge	Hamamatsu			35°15′15″N 137°54′38″E		
Akamonue Kofun 赤門上古墳; Akamonue kofun	Hamamatsu			34°47′17″N 137°45′10″E		
Inui Castle ruins 犬居城跡; Inui-jō ato	Hamamatsu			34°57′43″N 137°53′24″E		
Saigagake Battlefield site 犀ヶ崖古戦場; Saigagake kosenjō	Hamamatsu	Battle of Mikatagahara		34°43′10″N 137°51′05″E		
Sentōgamine Castle ruins 千頭峯城跡; Sentōgamine-jō ato	Hamamatsu			34°49′17″N 137°33′34″E		
Takimine Saishirōtani Site 滝峯才四郎谷遺跡; Takimine Saishirōtani iseki	Hamamatsu			34°47′55″N 137°41′27″E		
Nihongayatsu Piled Stone Burial Mounds 二本ヶ谷積石塚群; Nihongayatsu miishizuka-gun	Hamamatsu			34°47′37″N 137°45′03″E		
Jinzagaya Kofun 陣座ヶ谷古墳; Jinzagaya kofun	Hamamatsu	two burials		34°47′59″N 137°40′06″E		
Ii Jinja Precinct Site 渭伊神社境内遺跡; Ii Jinja keidai ato	Hamamatsu			34°49′58″N 137°39′49″E		
Ōno Inochiyama 大野命山・中新田命山（うち、大野命山） Ōno Inochiyama・Nakashinden Inochiyama (uchi Ōno Inochiyama)	Fukuroi			34°40′43″N 137°56′59″E		
Nakashinden Inochiyama 大野命山・中新田命山（うち、中新田命山） Ōno Inochiyama・Nakashinden Inochiyama (uchi Nakashinden Inochiyama)	Fukuroi			34°40′37″N 137°57′38″E		
Daimon Ōtsuka Kofun 大門大塚古墳附出土遺物; Daimon Ōtsuka kofun	Fukuroi	designation includes 189 excavated artefacts		34°44′30″N 137°55′48″E		
Nyakuōji Kofun Cluster 若王子古墳群; Nyakuōji kofun-gun	Fujieda	twenty-eight burials		34°52′34″N 138°15′24″E		
Iwabuchi Ichirizuka 岩淵の一里塚; Iwabuchi ichirizuka	Fuji			35°08′54″N 138°37′09″E		
Kotohira Kofun 琴平古墳; Kotohira kofun	Fuji			35°10′10″N 138°44′15″E		
Katsumata Castle ruins 勝間田城跡; Katsumata-jō ato	Makinohara			34°46′43″N 138°07′36″E		
Mukaiyama Kofun Cluster 向山古墳群; Mukaiyama kofun-gun	Mishima			35°06′23″N 138°56′34″E		
Yoshida Shōin Residence 吉田松陰寓寄処; Yoshida Shōin Gukijo	Shimoda			34°41′54″N 138°55′51″E		
Funakubo Kofun 舟久保古墳; Funakubo kofun	Kikugawa			34°41′37″N 138°06′51″E		
Isezuka Kofun 伊勢塚古墳; Isezuka kofun	Fuji, Shizuoka			35°10′10″N 138°40′15″E		
Kōshinzuka Kofun 庚申塚古墳; Kōshinzuka kofun	Fuji, Shizuoka			35°08′08″N 138°44′59″E		

== Municipal Historic Sites ==
As of 1 May 2024, a further two hundred and eighty-four Sites have been designated as being of municipal importance.

== See also ==
- Cultural Properties of Japan
- Tōtōmi, Suruga, and Izu Provinces
- List of Places of Scenic Beauty of Japan (Shizuoka)
- List of Cultural Properties of Japan - historical materials (Shizuoka)
- List of Cultural Properties of Japan - paintings (Shizuoka)
