= Mitsuke School =

former Mitsuke School
- 旧見付学校
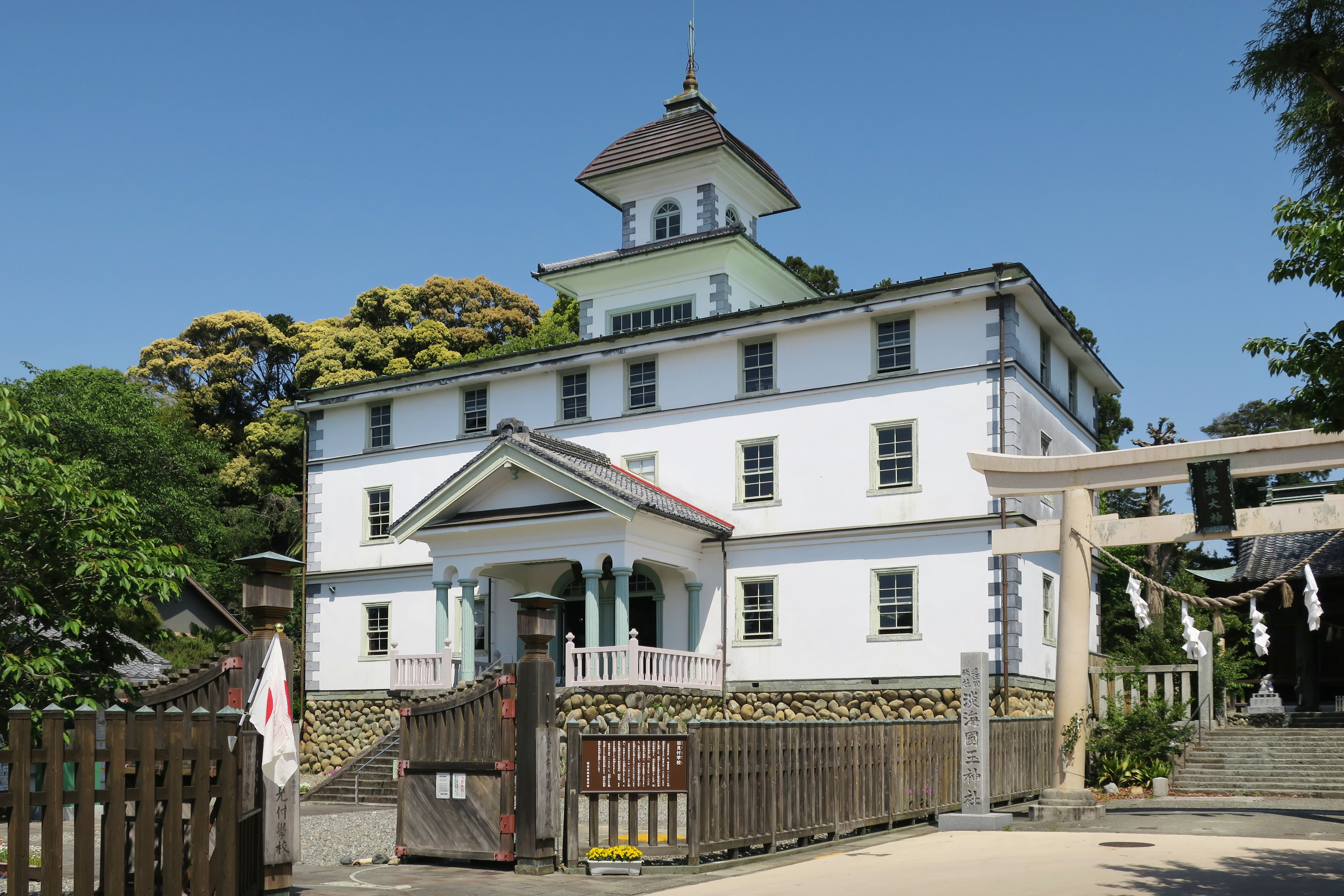
- Old Mitsuke School front facade

- Location within Shizuoka Prefecture Location within Japan

General information
- Architectural style: Giyōfū
- Location: Iwata, Shizuoka, Japan
- Coordinates: 34°43′39″N 137°51′25″E
- Completed: 1875

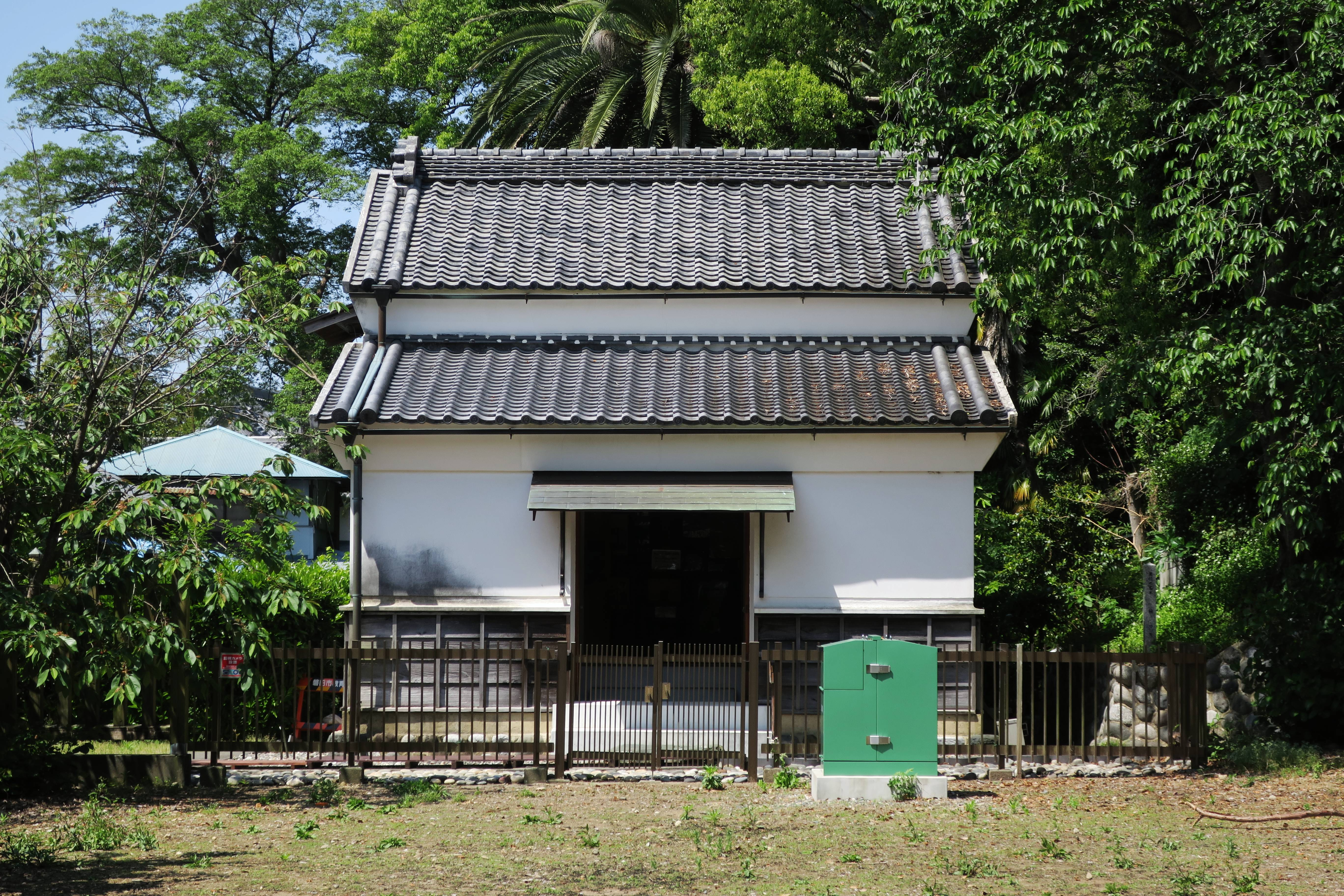
Iwata Bunko

The Former Mitsuke School (旧見付学校, kyū-Mitsuke Gakkō) is a surviving Giyōfū-style Meiji period school building located in the city of Iwata, Shizuoka in the Tōkai region of Japan. The building was designated a National Historic Site of Japan in 1996.

== Overview ==
Built in 1875, the Mitsuke school vies with the Former Nakagomi School in Saku, Nagano for the title of the "oldest western school building in Japan". As with the Nakagomi School, the wooden school building is an example of the Giyōfū-style of the early Meiji period, a pseudo-Western style of architecture which incorporates both western and Japanese elements. The building originally had three stories on a sone foundation, with basic stone walls and entasis-style pillars placed at the entrance. The exterior and interior walls were plastered. In 1883, the building was enlarged by remodeling the 2nd floor and expanding the 3rd floor, and by adding the two-story tower. The tower contained a drum, rather than a bell, for telling the time.

It closed as a school in 1922, and was thereafter used for a number of purposes, including a teachers' training college, martial arts dōjō, girl's high school sewing classroom, Imperial Japanese Army hospital, and municipal hall, until it finally reopened in 1992 as an education museum.

On the north side of the former school is the Iwata Bunko, which was founded by the local kokugaku scholar Ōkubo Takuhisa in 1864 on land donated by the neighboring Ōmikunitama Jinja Shinto shrine. This library contains over 5000 volumes of works pertaining the kokugaku studies, and is housed in a kura-style building. The Iwata Bunko also protected under the same national historic site designation as the former Mitsuke School.

== See also ==
- List of Historic Sites of Japan (Shizuoka)
