= Miikedaira Kofun =

Kofun period keyhole-shaped burial mound in Shizuoka, Japan

- 三池平古墳 (Japanese)
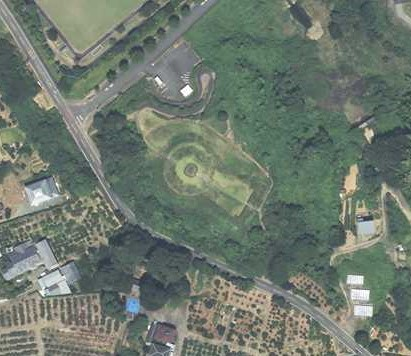
- Miikedaira Kofun aerial photograph in 2020

- Miikedaira Kofun Miikedaira Kofun (Japan)
- 35°03′13.38″N 138°28′50.44″E
- Type: Kofun
- Periods: Kofun period
- Location: 927-1 Hara, Shimizu-ku, Shizuoka, Japan
- Region: Tōkai region

History
- Built: c.early 5th century

Site notes
- Public access: Yes (no facilities)
- Shizuoka Prefecture Historic Site

Miikedaira Kofun (三池平古墳) is an early-middle Kofun period (early 5th century) keyhole-shaped burial mound, located in the Hara neighborhood of Shimizu-ku, Shizuoka in the Tōkai region of Japan. The tumulus was designated a Shizuoka Prefecture Historic Site in 2001.

== Overview ==
The Miikedaira Kofun is a zenpō-kōen-fun (前方後円墳), which is shaped like a keyhole, having one square end and one circular end, when viewed from above. It is located north of Shizuoka Municipal Shimizu Ihara Junior High School, on a hilltop where a Shinto shrine, the Togashika Jinja (砥鹿神社) is situated. It is at an elevation of 55 meters above sea level on a flat area on a hill ridge between the Yamakiri River (east side) and the Ihara River (west side).

The tumulus measures 65 meters in length, with a circular posterior diameter of 43 meters and height of 5 meters. The rectangular anterior section is 36 meters wide and 3.2 meters high and is orientated to the southeast. The mound is constructed in three tiers, but the first tier only partially exists on the southwest side. The surrounding moat is also only present on the north and east sides of the base of the mound. Fukiishi paving stones were laid on part of the base of the mound, and jar-shaped haniwa were placed on top of the mound. It was discovered in 1956 during farm work in a mandarin orange grove, and was excavated in 1958.

A vertical shaft stone burial chamber was found at the top of the posterior circular section, with its main axis oriented northeast-southwest. It consisted of stacked flat stones with seven ceiling stones on top, and the interior covered with clay. Inside was a split-bamboo-shaped stone sarcophagus made of andesite. The inside of the sarcophagus was painted vermilion and contained the skeletal remains of a relatively young male, as well as ornaments and decorations such as wheel-shaped stones, stone bracelets, small beads, and tubular beads. Furthermore, by shifting the foundation stones of the burial chamber, a shelf-like section was created in the gap between the chamber and the sarcophagus. This section contained two shinju-kyo bronze mirrors—a modified square-patterned mirror depicting four deities and another with four animal motifs—as well as cylindrical bronze vessels, spindle-wheel-shaped and scallop-shaped stone artifacts, iron weapons such as swords, knives, and arrowheads, and iron farming tools such as axes, sickles, and hoe heads.

No other burial facilities with this structure exist east of the Miikehira Kofun, and the grave goods are unique, leading to the hypothesis that it is the tomb of a powerful chieftain of the Ihara clan, who ruled this region of central Shizuoka in the first half of the Kofun period. The Gōdoyama No. 3 Kofun, another zenpō-kōen-fun is located about one kilometer to the southwest and any other burial mounds from the first half of the Kofun period are concentrated in the Ihara River basin.

It was designated a historical site of the then Shimizu City on November 20, 1992, but became a designated historical site of Shizuoka Prefecture on March 15, 2001, and restoration work was completed in 2009. The excavated artifacts are stored and displayed at the Shizuoka City Buried Cultural Properties Center.

Total length
65 meters:
Anterior rectangular portion
36 meters wide x 3.2 meters high, 3-tier
Posterior circular portion
43 meter diameter x 5 meters high, 3-tiers

== Gallery ==
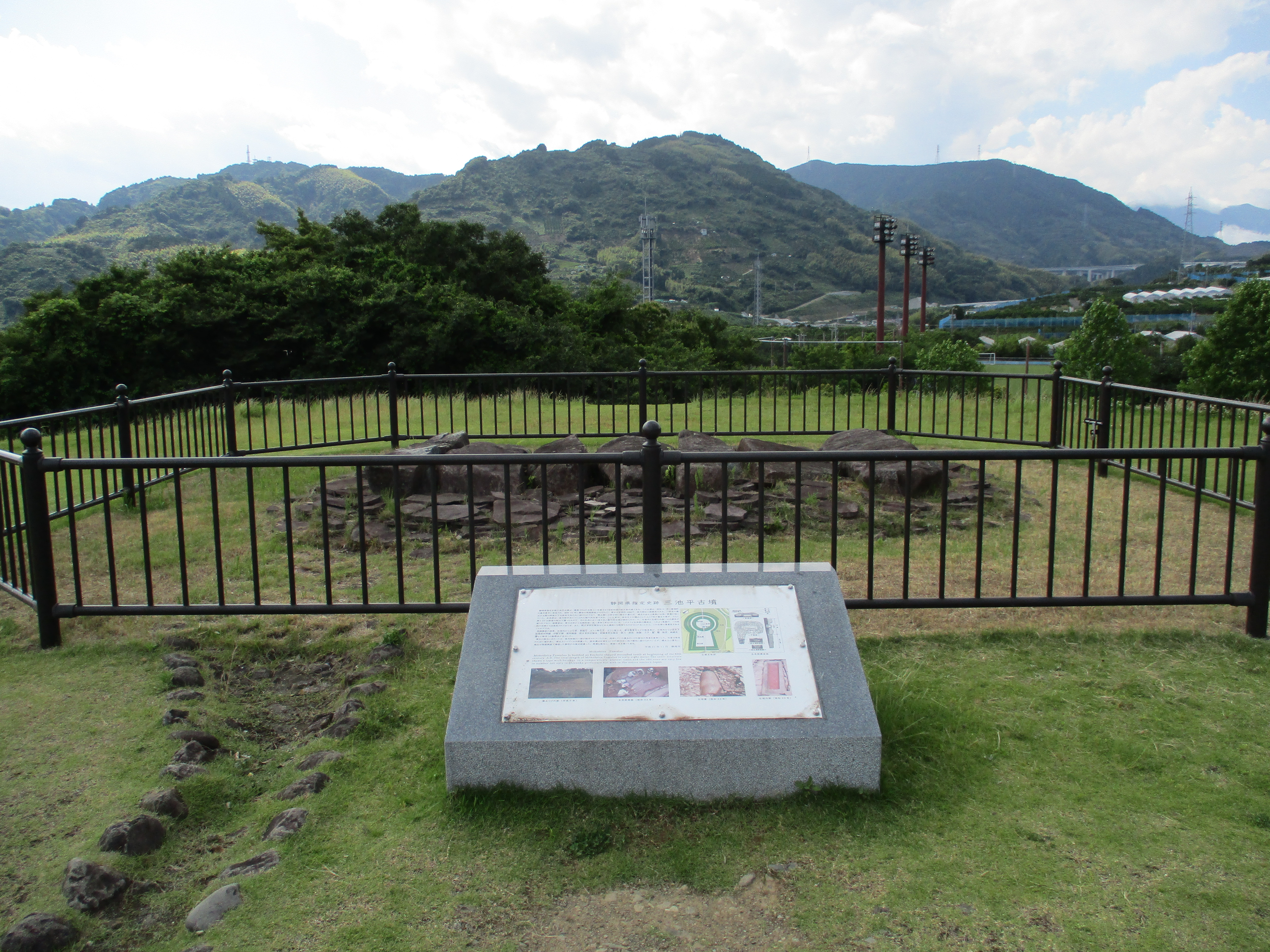
The top of the rear mound.

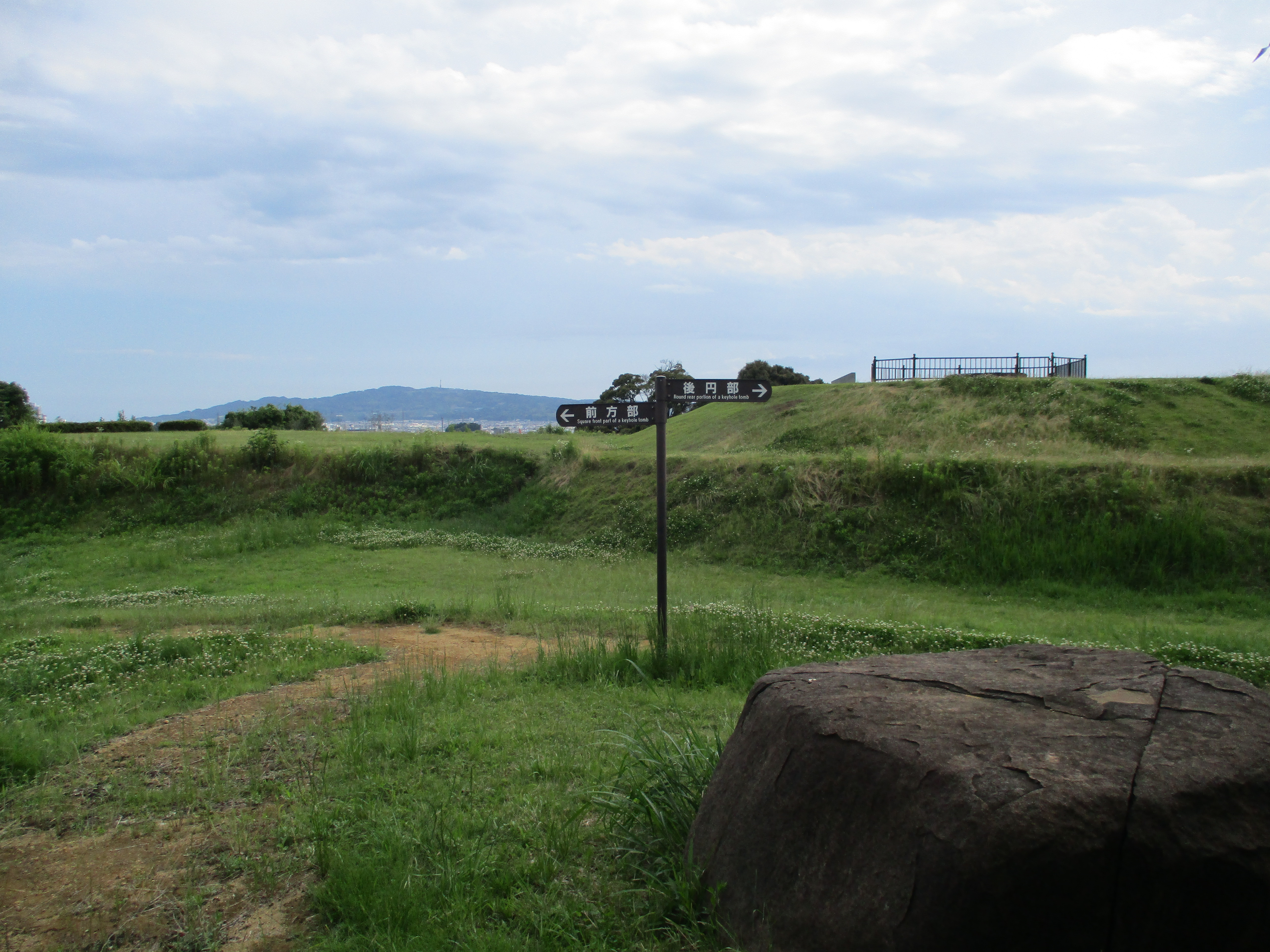
Side view

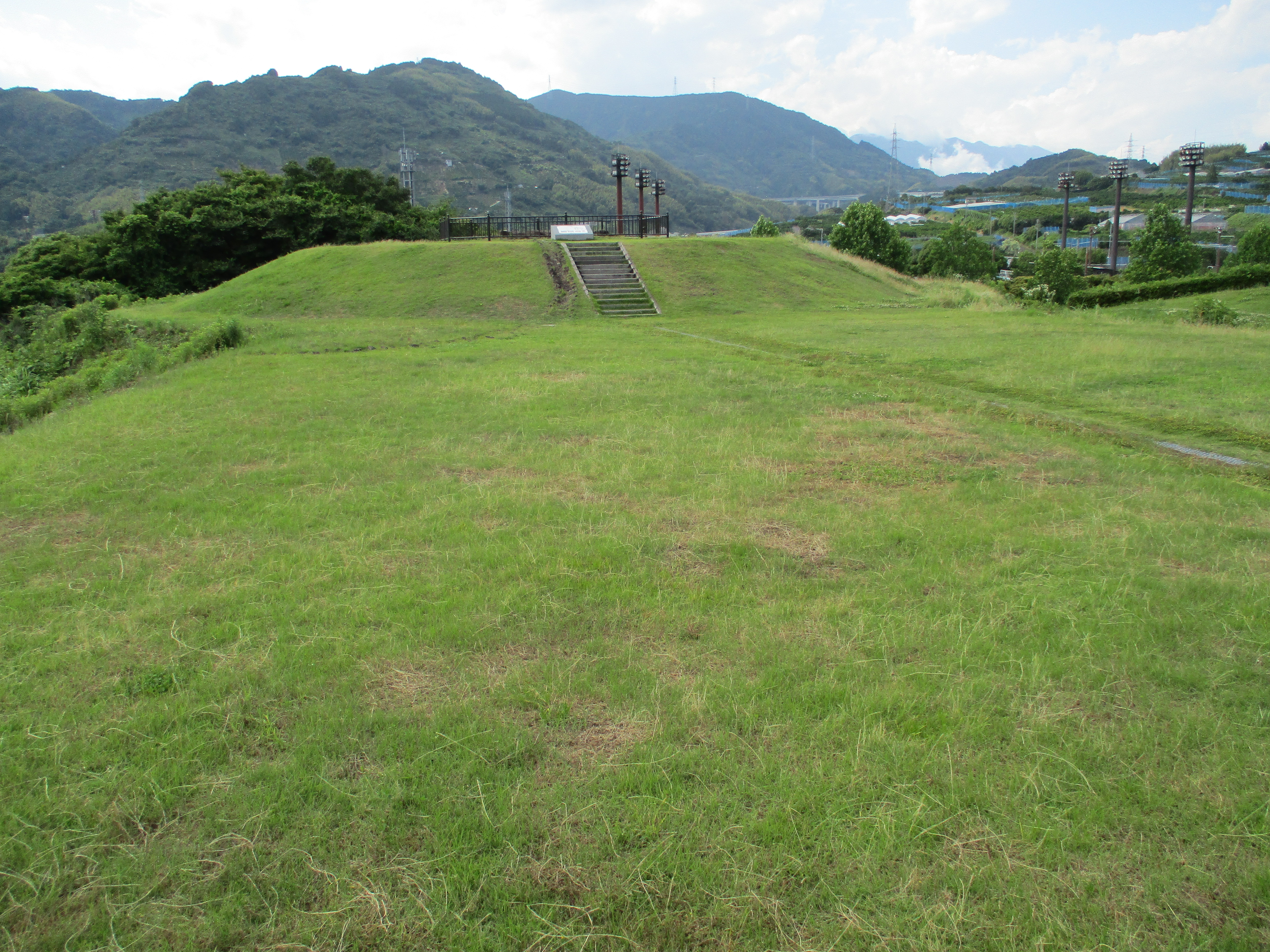
View from the front and looking at the rear mound.

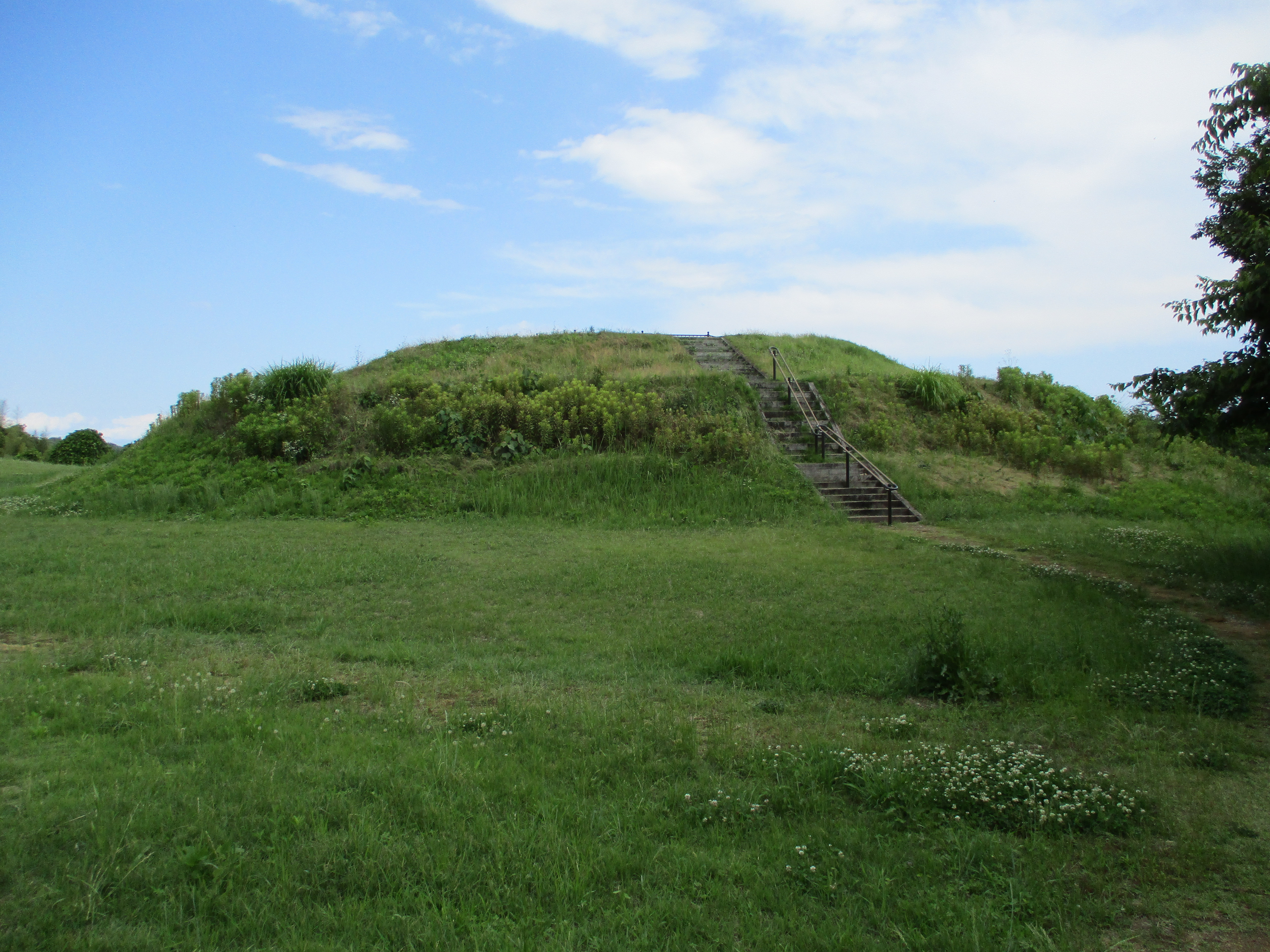
Posterior circular portion

== See also ==
- List of Historic Sites of Japan (Shizuoka)
