= Kawarakezuka Kofun =

Kofun period burial mound in Shizuoka, Japan

- 土器塚古墳 (Japanese)
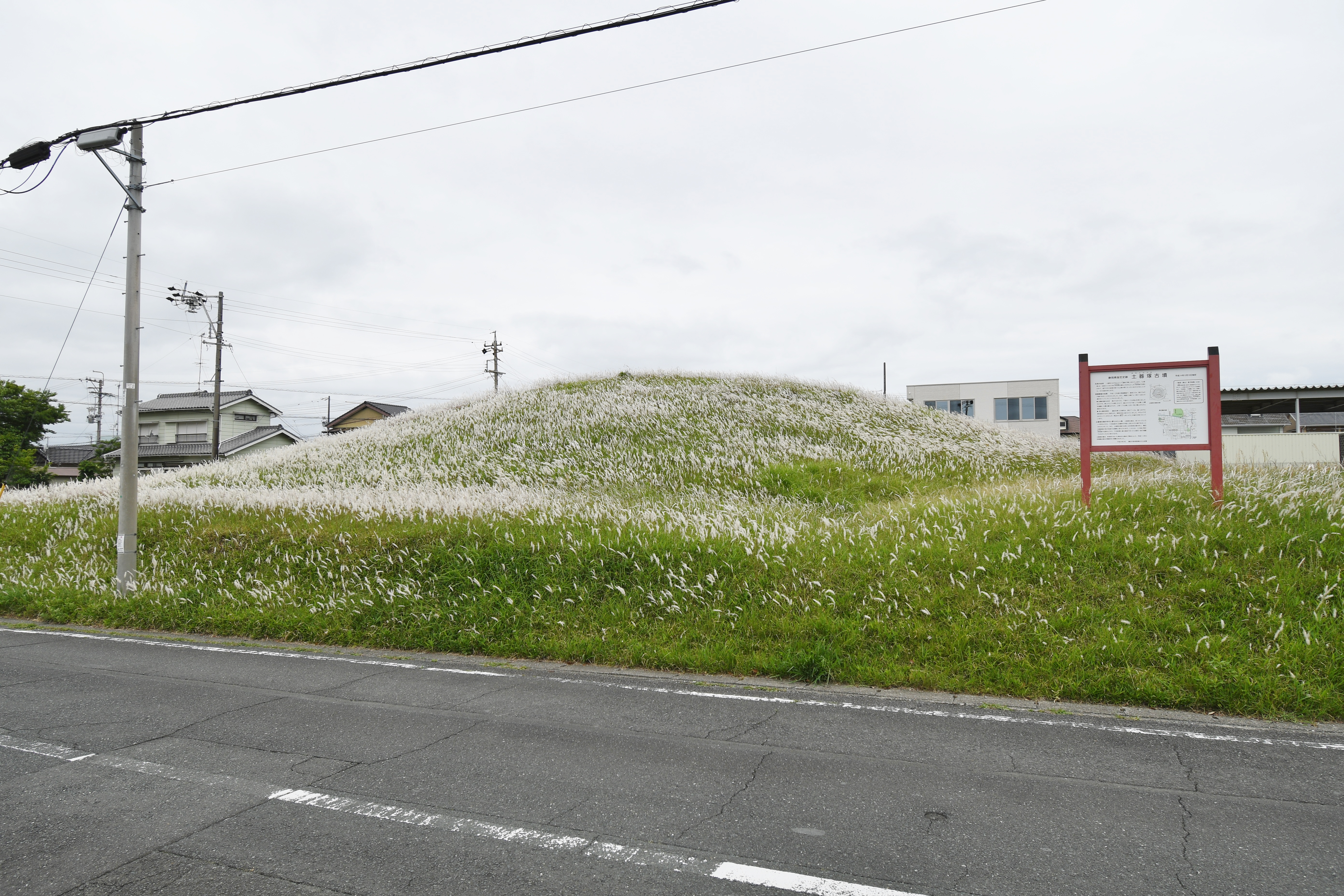
- Kawarakezuka Kofun

- Kawarakezuka Kofun Kawarakezuka Kofun (Japan)
- 34°43′10″N 137°50′37″E
- Type: Kofun
- Periods: Kofun period
- Location: 3-1 Kōnodai, Iwata, Shizuoka, Japan 438-0077
- Region: Tōkai region

History
- Built: c.early 5th century

Site notes
- Public access: Yes (no facilities)

Kawarakezuka Kofun (土器塚古墳) is an middle Kofun period (early 5th century) enpun (円墳)-style round kofun burial mound, located in the Nakaizumi-Kōnodai neighborhood of the city of Iwata, Shizuoka in the Tōkai region of Japan. The tumulus was designated a Shizuoka Prefecture Historic Site in 2002.

== Overview ==
Surrounding area

The Kawarakezuka Kofun is situated on a fluvial terrace at the southwestern edge of the Iwatabara Plateau in western Shizuoka Prefecture. The name originates from a local legend about a Prince Kaisei (or Prince Kaijō), in which the prince and his retainers discarded large amounts of pottery, creating the mound. It is now also commonly known as "Maruyama". The tumulus is circular, with a diameter of 36 meters and height of five meters. The lower third of the mound was carved from the natural ground, while the upper two-thirds were constructed from earth. A moat seven meters wide and one meter deep surrounds the mound. A limited archaeological excavation was conducted in 2000. While the burial facilities are unclear, a burial pit measuring 7-8 meters long and 1one meter wide along its east-west axis has been identified at the top of the mound. A tubular bead and a rectangular piece of leather-bound armor have been found nearby.

Several other burial mounds, including the Kannonyama Kofun, Kabutozuka Kofun, and Kyomizuka Kofun, are distributed in the area, suggesting a connection to the Haji clan, the Kuni no miyatsuko governors of Tōtōmi Province..

== See also ==
- List of Historic Sites of Japan (Shizuoka)
