= Enoura Cave Tomb Cluster =

Enoura Cave Tombs
- 江浦横穴群 (Japanese)
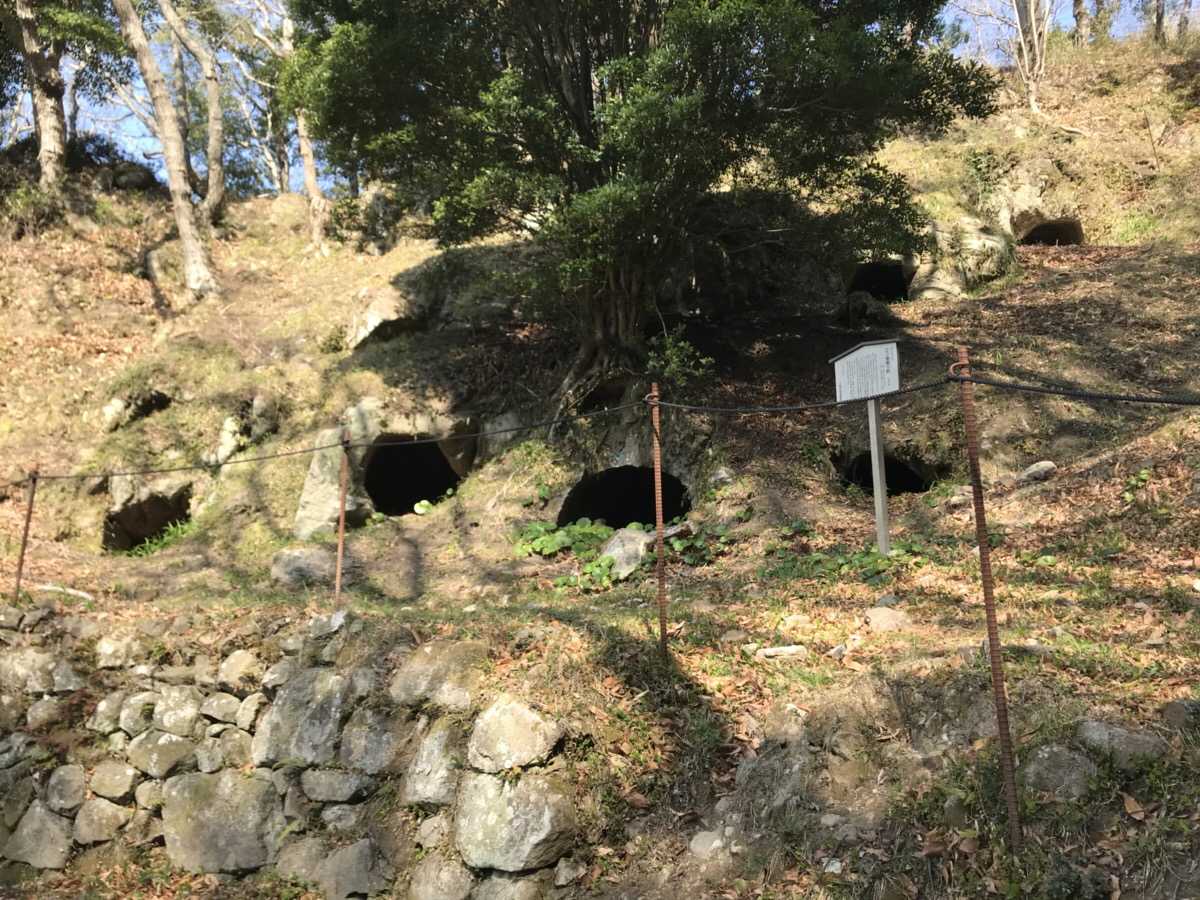
- Enoura Cave Tombs

- Enoura Cave Tombs Enoura Cave Tomb Cluster (Japan)
- 35°03′12.0″N 138°53′48.0″E
- Type: necropolis
- Periods: Kofun period
- Location: Numazu, Shizuoka, Japan
- Region: Tokai region

History
- Built: 7th-8th century CE

Site notes
- Owner: Public
- Public access: Yes
- Shizuoka Prefecture Historic Site

The Enoura Cave Tombs (江浦横穴群, Enoura yokoana-gun) is a cluster of yokoanabo tombs dug in artificial caves in a tuff cliff of located in the Enoura and Tai neighborhoods of the city of Numazu, Shizuoka Prefecture in the Tokai region of Japan. It was designated as a Shizuoka Prefectural Historic Site in 1977.

== Background ==
The Enoura Cave Tombs are located on the southern slope of Mount Washizu at an elevation raging from 20 to 60 meters. Each has an opening of approximately 50 centimeters to 1 meter in diameter and is one to three meters deep, constructed by carving into tuff rock with a chisel-like tool. Careful observation of the walls of the horizontal tombs reveals traces of chiseling. This is the largest group of yokoanabo tombs in Numazu: however large groups of similar horizontal tombs can be found in Kannami, and Izunokuni, both of which are designated National Historic Sites.

It consists of five groups: four groups of horizontal tombs and one group of circular enpun (円墳)-style circular burial mounds (Enoura Kofun),150 meters to the east at an 100 meters above sea level. The exact number of horizontal tombs is uncertain, as there as never been a formal comprehensive survey and many tombs made be hidden by dense vegetation or completely buried. A total of 74 tombs in Area A, 2 in Area B, 14 in Area C, and 2 in Area D, for a total of 92 tombs have been identified. All are thought to date from the late 7th to early 8th centuries. However, the Prefectural designation covers only Areas A and D, which are the central groups of horizontal tombs.

While only Sue ware pottery grave goods such as lidded pedestaled bowls, flat bottles, lidded bowls, and long-necked bottles, have been collected in the past, it is also reported that fragments of straight swords and human bones have been unearthed in the past.

The circular kofun burial mounds have exposed ceiling stones, side walls, and part of the back wall of the stone burial chambers, and a portion of the base of the mounds can be seen, but the mounds itself have disappeared.

The differences in social status between those buried in the horizontal tombs and those buried in the small circular burial mounds, and the relationship to nearby settlements remain unclear. The Kano River basin contains both horizontal tombs and clusters of burial mounds, some theorize that the groups that built the horizontal tombs were migrants and different from the original inhabitants who built the burial mounds.

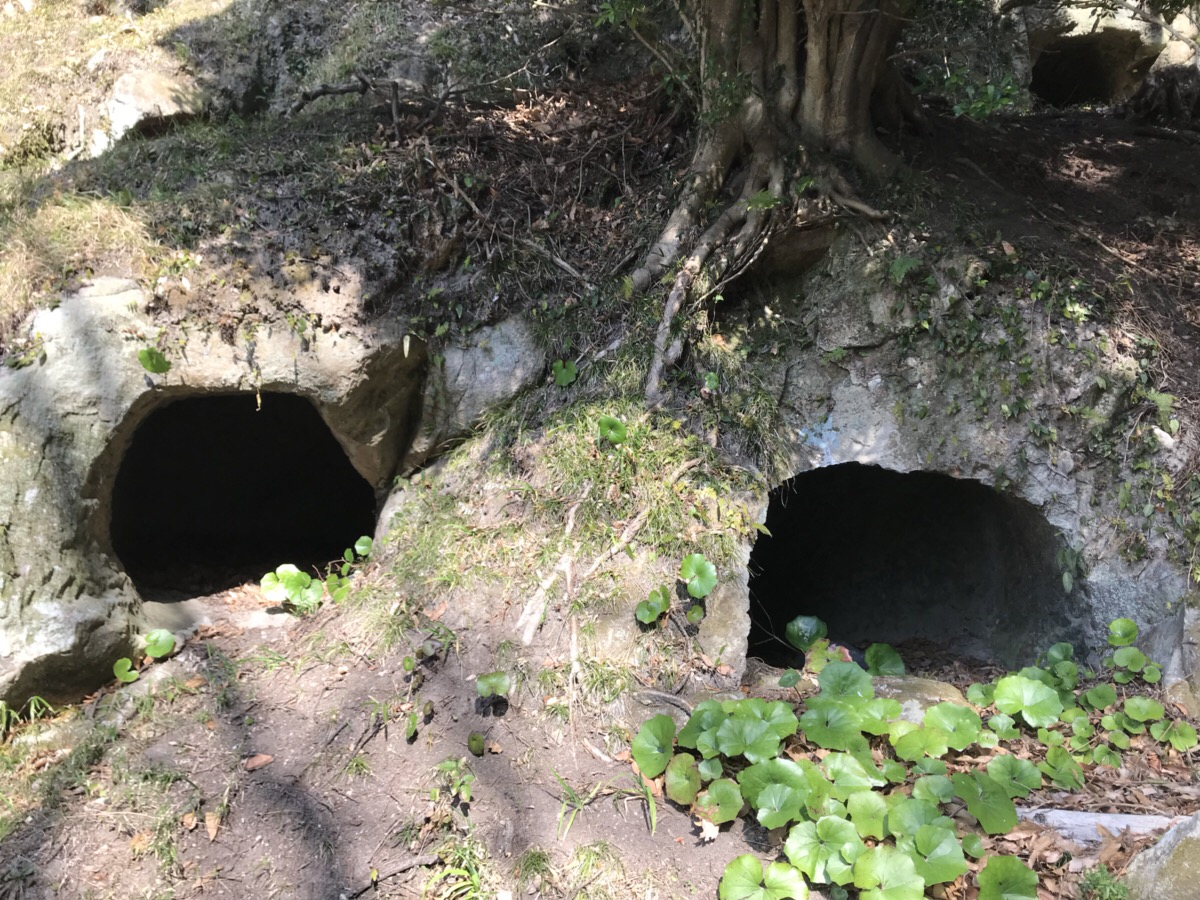
Enoura Cave Tombs, Area A.

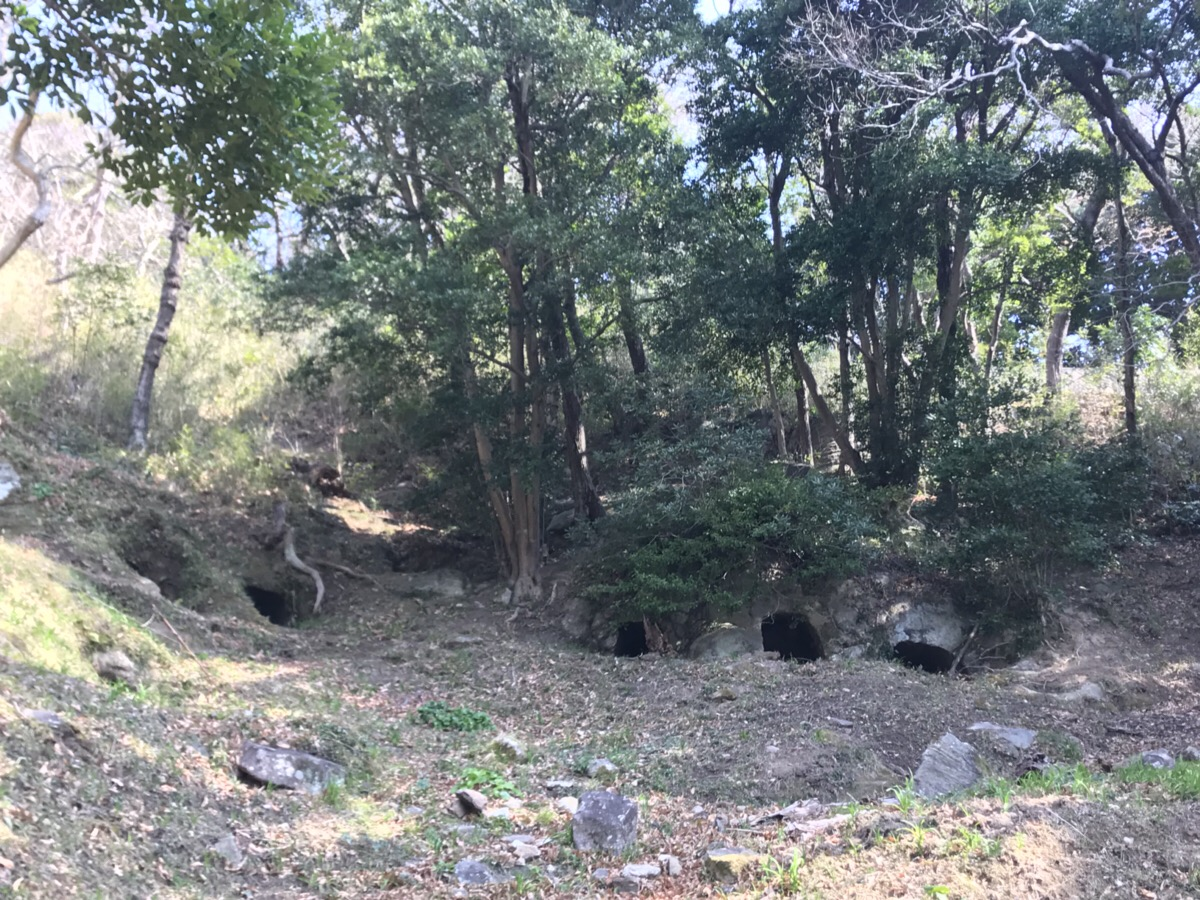
Enoura Cave Tombs, Area A.

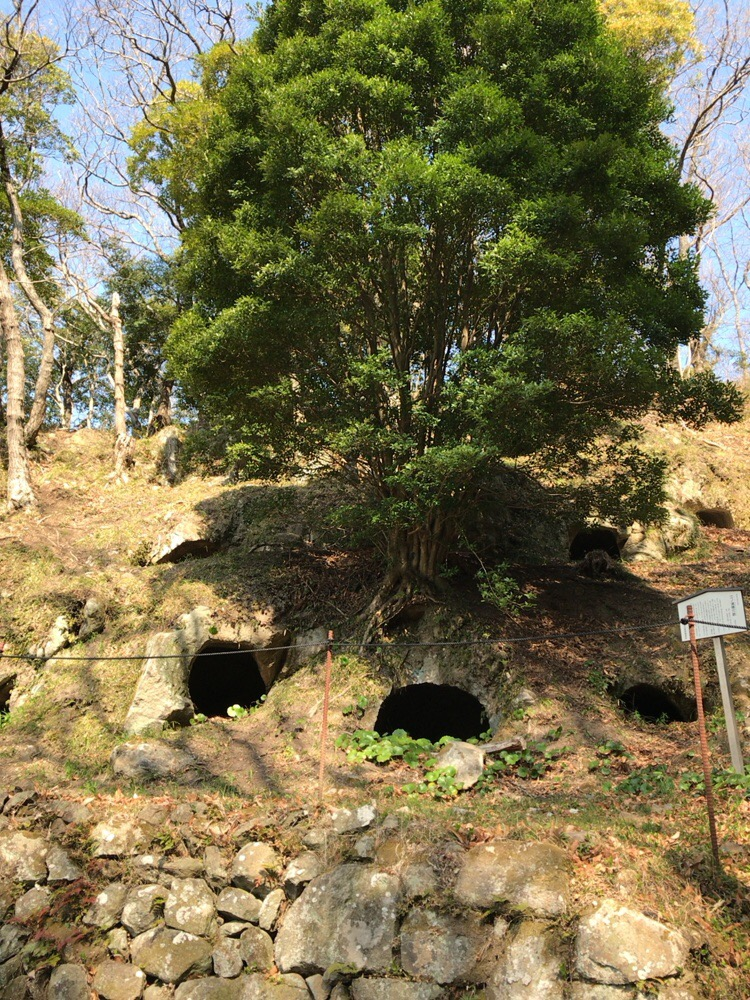
Enoura Cave Tombs, Area A.

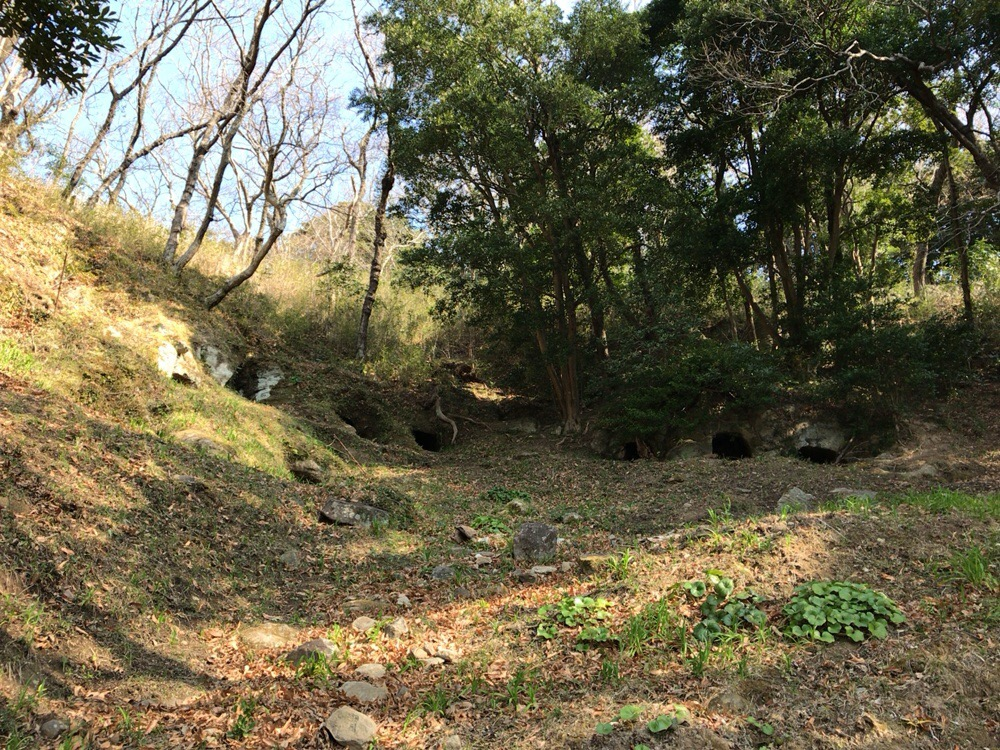
Enoura Cave Tombs, Area A.

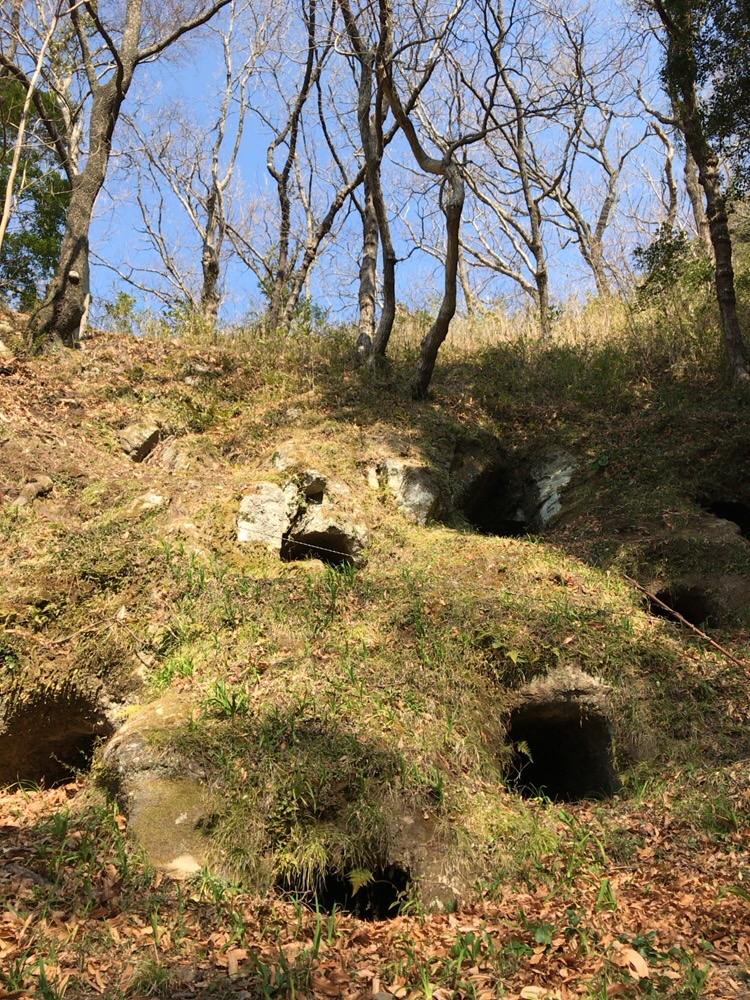
Enoura Cave Tombs, Area A.

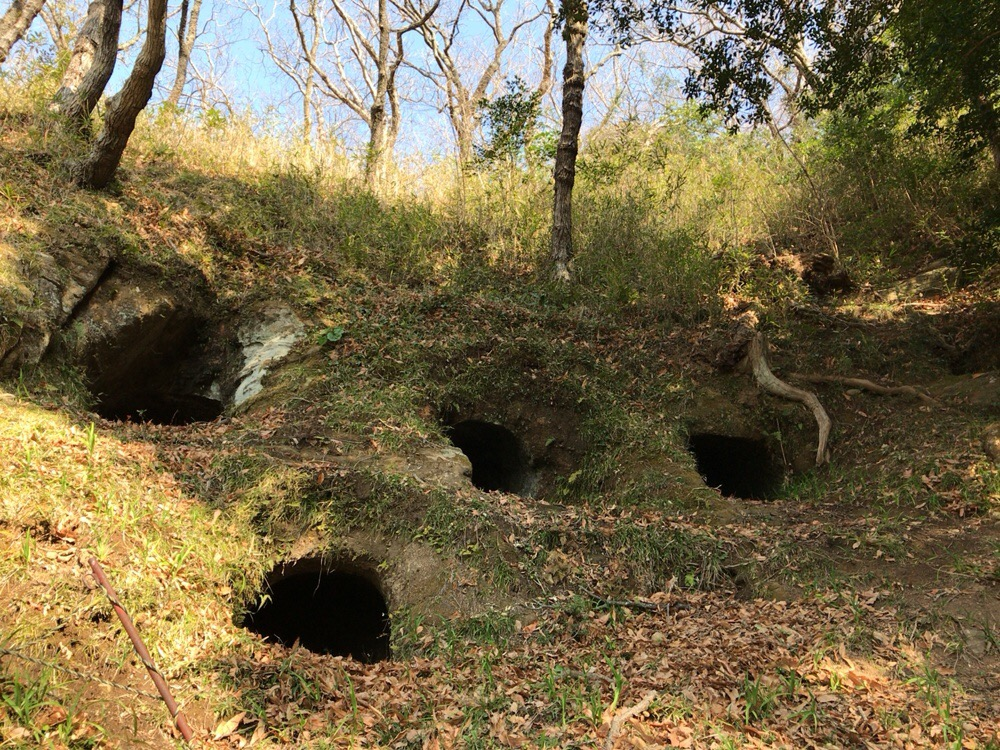
Enoura Cave Tombs, Area A.

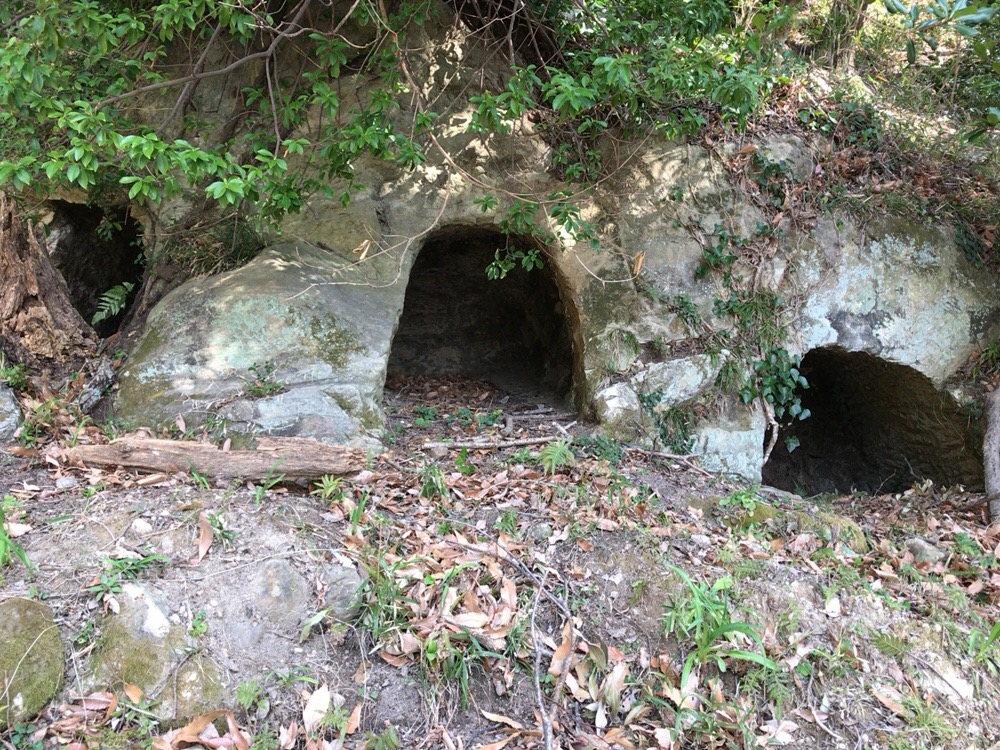
Enoura Cave Tombs, Area A.

== See also ==
- List of Historic Sites of Japan (Shizuoka)
