= Yasumiba ruins =

Paleolithic settlement in Japan

- 休場遺跡 (Japanese)
- Yasumiba ruins Yasumiba ruins (Japan)
- 35°10′00″N 138°50′15″E
- Type: settlement
- Periods: Japanese Paleolithic
- Location: Numazu, Shizuoka, Japan
- Region: Tōkai region

History
- Built: 12,300 BCE

Site notes
- Public access: No public facilities

The Yasumiba site (休場遺跡, Yasumiba iseki) is an archaeological site with the traces of a Japanese Paleolithic period settlement located in what is now the Ashitaka neighborhood of the city of Numazu, Shizuoka in the Tōkai region of Japan. The site was designated a National Historic Site in 1979. It was the first site from the Japanese Paleolithic period to receive National Historic Site designation.

== Overview ==
During the Upper Paleolithic period, roughly until 13,000 years ago, the shapes and types of stone tools, such as stone axes, spears, and microlith blades evolved due to rapid changes in the environment, which resulted in changes in the fauna available for hunting. Microliths, thin and razor-shape blades of stone which were used by embedding into shafts of wood or bone, appears towards the end of the Upper Paleolithic. The Yasumiba ruins is one of several sites from this period which have been identified in the gently rolling foothills of Mount Ashitaka. This site is located at an elevation of 280 meters on a 60 meter wide ridge, protected by steep cliffs and swamps on all sides.

Excavated in 1964 by Meiji University, the site was found to contain a large number of microlith blades, lithic cores and flakes buried below a pyroclastic layer of ash from an eruption of Mount Fuji 2.5 meters below the present ground level. The microlithic blade culture in Japan is roughly divided into two cultures, one is of conical microlithic cores and the other is of boat-bottomed microlithic cores. This site is typical of the former, and the material used was primarily obsidian which originated in what is now Nagano Prefecture or from Kōzushima, one of the Izu islands, indicating some form of long distance trade and a maritime capability for the inhabitants of the Japanese archipelago even at that early time in prehistory. The number of stone tools and core fragments recovered was 4412 items.

Two traces of semi-circular hearths made from rounded riverstones were also found, containing fragments of charcoal, and it is presumed that these hearths were located within a pit dwelling. These were the first Japanese Paleolithic period hearths to be discovered. One hearth was 180 cm x 100 cm, and the smaller was approximately 50 cm in diameter. Carbon dating of the charcoal indicated that these hearths were used 14,300 years ago.

The site is approximately five minutes by car from Tōmei Expressway Numazu IC, and having been backfilled after excavation, is currently a grassy mound with a small signpost.

== See also ==
- List of Historic Sites of Japan (Shizuoka)
