= Nyakuōji Kofun Cluster =

Kofun period burial mound cluster in Shizuoka, Japan

Nyakuōji Kofun cluster
- 若王子古墳群 (Japanese)
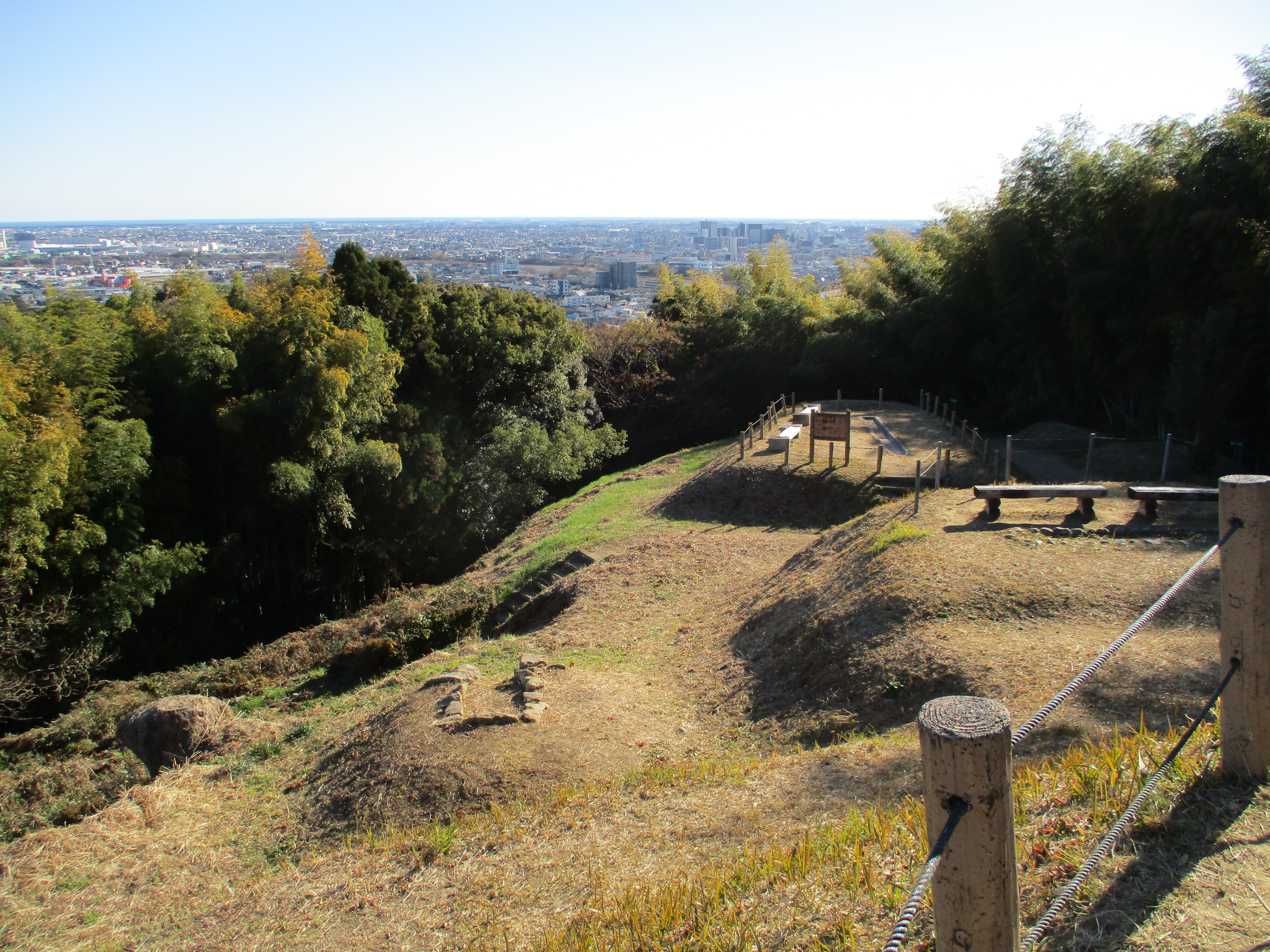
- Nyakuōji Kofun No.5

- Nyakuōji Kofun cluster Nyakuōji Kofun Cluster (Japan)
- 34°52′35.2″N 138°14′58.9″E
- Type: Kofun cluser
- Periods: Kofun period
- Location: Fujieda, Shizuoka, Japan
- Region: Tōkai region

History
- Built: late 4th-6th centuriesy

Site notes
- Public access: Yes (park)
- Shizuoka Prefecture Historic Site

The Nyakuōji Kofun cluster (若王子古墳群) is a group of early to middle Kofun period (4th - 6th century) hōfun (方墳)-style and enpun (円墳)-style round burial mounds, located in the Nyakuōji neighborhood of the city of Fujieda, Shizuoka in the Tōkai region of Japan. The tumulus cluster was collectively designated a Shizuoka Prefecture Historic Site in 1995.

== Overview ==
The Nyakuōji Kofun cluster is located on a hill approximately 110 meters above sea level, overlooking the Shida Plain where the urban areas of Fujieda and Yaizu cities spread, the cluster consists of 28 burial mounds (some sources say 33) which are densely clustered along the ridge. While the cluster spans approximately 300 years, from the late 4th to the 6th centuries, many of the mounds from the 4th and 5th centuries feature direct burials in box-shaped or boat-shaped wooden coffins, with only a few 6th-century mounds possessing horizontal stone burial chambers. The grave goods include bronze mirrors form Kofun No.1 and No.31 and a wheel-shaped stone from Kofun No.12 suggest a connection to the Kinai region.

The ridge where the tumulus group is located is called "Fujimi-daira". In 1432, Ashikaga Yoshinori, the 6th Shogun of the Muromachi shogunate, climbed this ridge the day before entering Sunpu to view Mount Fuji, and composed a waka poem.

The site is currently maintained as a corner of Rengeji Pond Park called "Kofun Plaza".

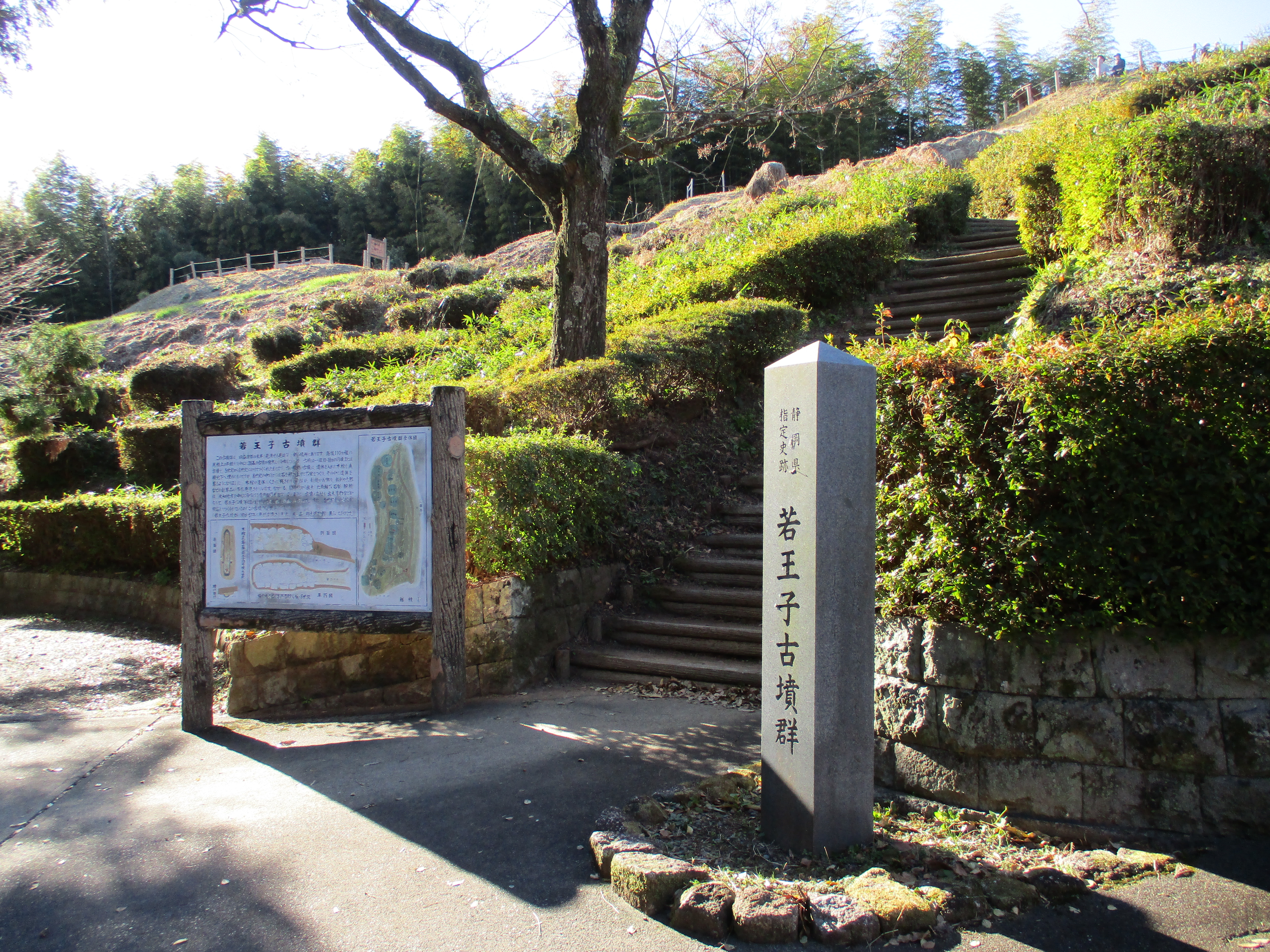

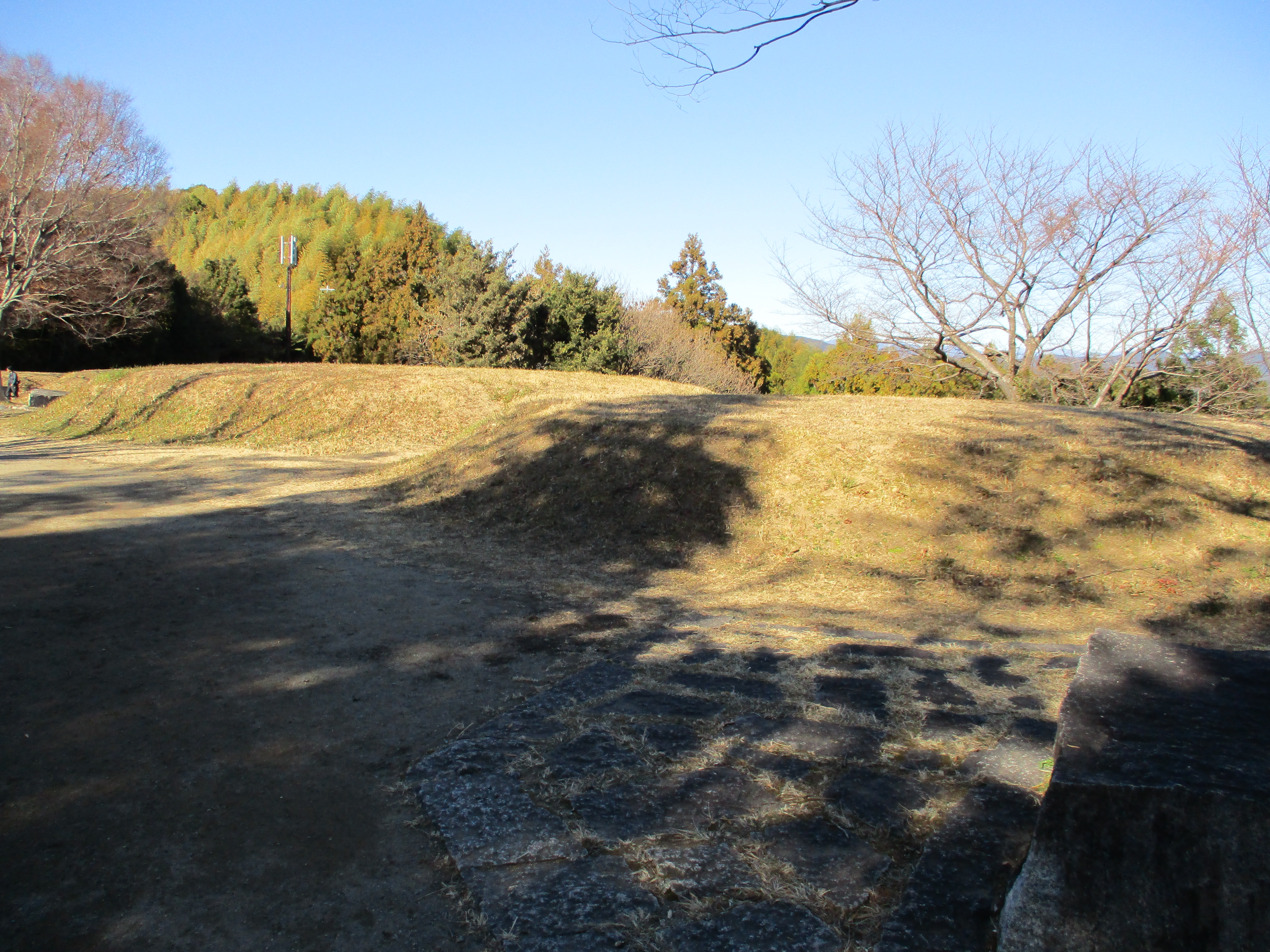

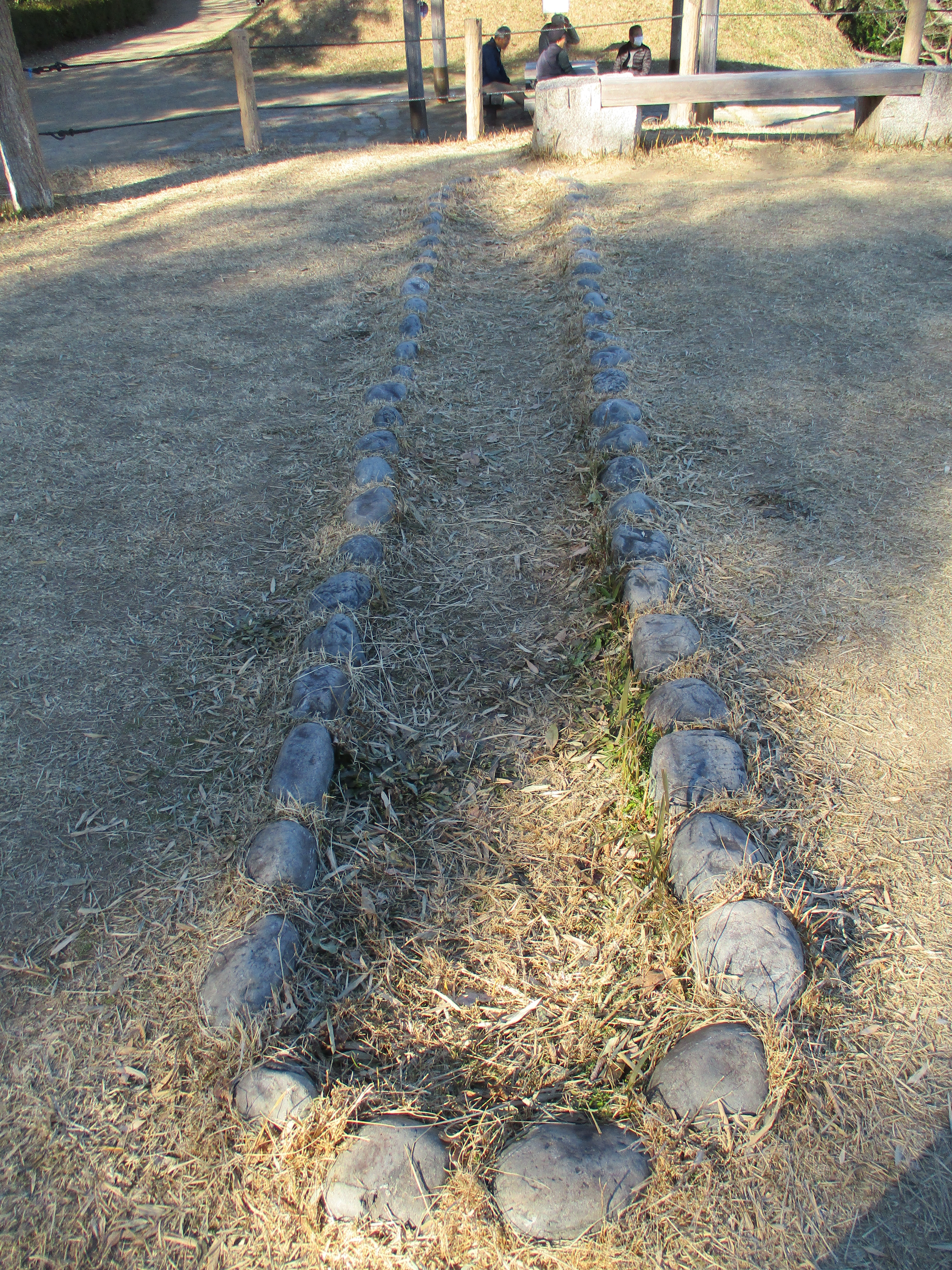

== See also ==
- List of Historic Sites of Japan (Shizuoka)
