= Itasungō Kofun Cluster =

Kofun period burial mound cluster in Shizuoka, Japan

Itasungō Kofun cluster
- 井田松江古墳群 (Japanese)
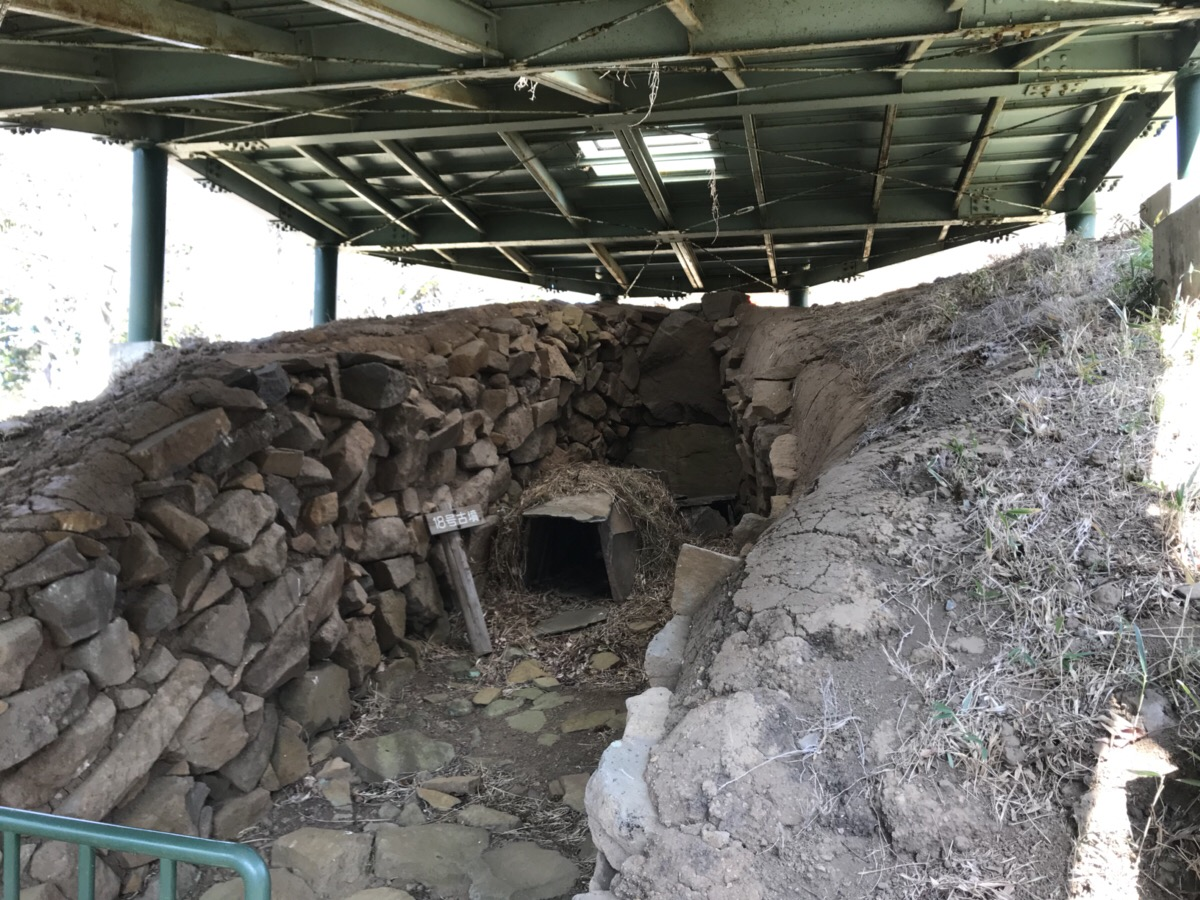
- Itasungō Kofun

- Itasungō Kofun cluster Itasungō Kofun Cluster (Japan)
- 35°0′29″N 138°46′47″E
- Type: Kofun cluser
- Periods: Kofun period
- Location: Numazu, Shizuoka, Japan
- Region: Tōkai region

History
- Built: late 6th century

Site notes
- Public access: Yes (park)
- Shizuoka Prefecture Historic Site

The Itasungō Kofun cluster (井田松江古墳群) is a group of late Kofun period (6th century) round burial mounds, located in the Ida neighborhood of the city of Numazu, Shizuoka in the Tōkai region of Japan. The tumulus cluster was collectively designated a Shizuoka Prefecture Historic Site in 1995.

== Overview ==
The Itasungō Kofun cluser is located on a ridge approximately 60-75 meters above sea level, jutting out into Suruga Bay. The cluster consists of 17 burial mounds at present, which are believed to be enpun (円墳)-style round burial mounds, with diameters of seven to 13 meters. Records from the Edo period indicate that there were formerly either 23 of 27 tumuli. Four archaeological excavations have been conducted on these tumuli in the post-war period. The first was in 1954 by a local high school teacher, who excavated Kofun No.7. Grave goods included gold rings, round beads, tubular beads, jujube-shaped beads, faceted beads, glass beads, iron arrowheads, horse trappings, and Sue ware pottery, along with human remains; however, the records of this excavation along with all recovered artifacts were lost when the school burned down that winter.

In 1964, Kofun No.9 and Kofun No.18 were excavated by then Toda Village, due to the planned construction of a road. Kofun No.18 was found to have a large horizontal stone burial chamber, approximately eights meters deep and 1.5 meters wide, and contained two stone sarcophagi of different sizes at the back. Excavated artifacts included personal ornaments, gold rings, beads, and weapons (straight swords, knives, and iron arrowheads). Of particular note is the discovery of four bronze bracelets and a silver-inlaid round-headed sword hilt found in Kofun No.18 in 1964. The design features a phoenix within a tortoise-shell pattern formed by connecting two parallel lines of double circles. Based on the whorl-like patterns surrounding the phoenix, it is believed to date to the fourth quarter of the 6th century. This hypothesis is consistent with the dating range of the unearthed Sue ware pottery. Many similar examples of inlaid round-pommel sword hilts of the same size and design are known. X-ray imaging of the unearthed artifacts from the 1996-1997 excavations confirmed the presence of four inlaid tsuba (sword guards) among the previously excavated artifacts. The designs were classified as one heart-shaped pattern and three spiral patterns. These are believed to date from the fourth quarter of the 6th century to the end of the 6th century.

The third excavation was in 1982 and 1984 with the aim of creating an overall site survey. In addition, drawings were created of the burial chambers in Kofun No.7 and Kofun No.18, as well as Kofun No.9. The fourth excavation from 1995 to 1997 was prompted by the designation of the tumulus cluster as a prefectural historical site in 1994. Kofun No.7 and No.18 were re-examined, and preparations were made to allow the stone burial chambers to be opened to the public.

Most of the excavated artifacts are housed in the Toda Shipbuilding Local History Museum.

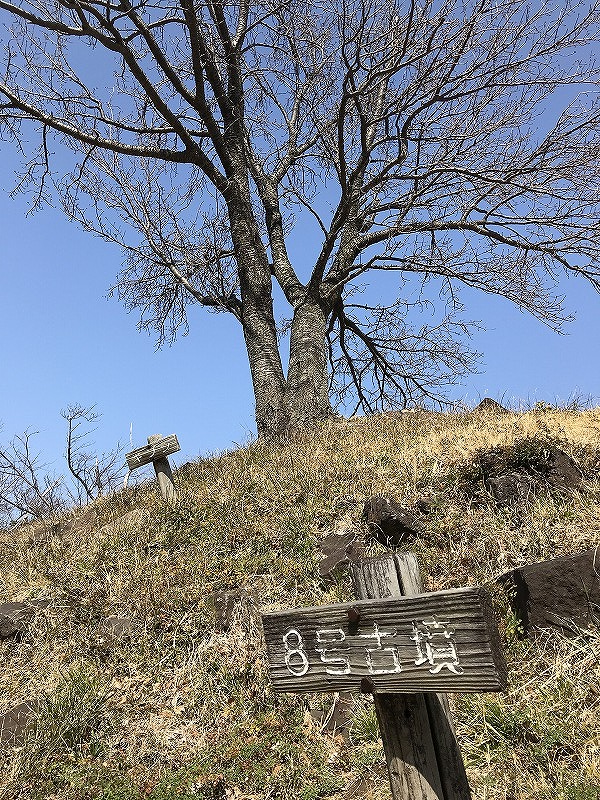
Itasungō Kofun No.8

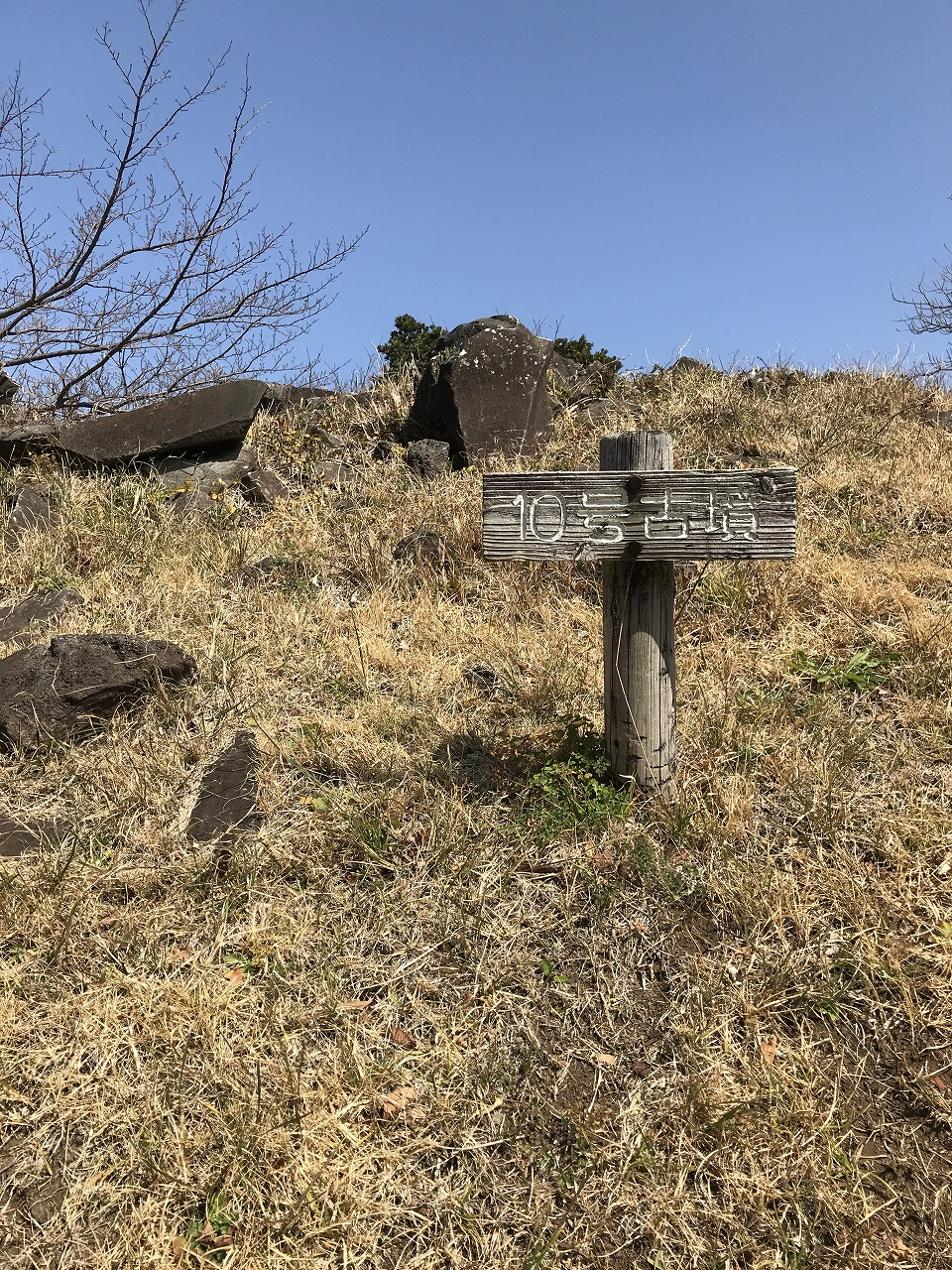
Itasungō Kofun No.10

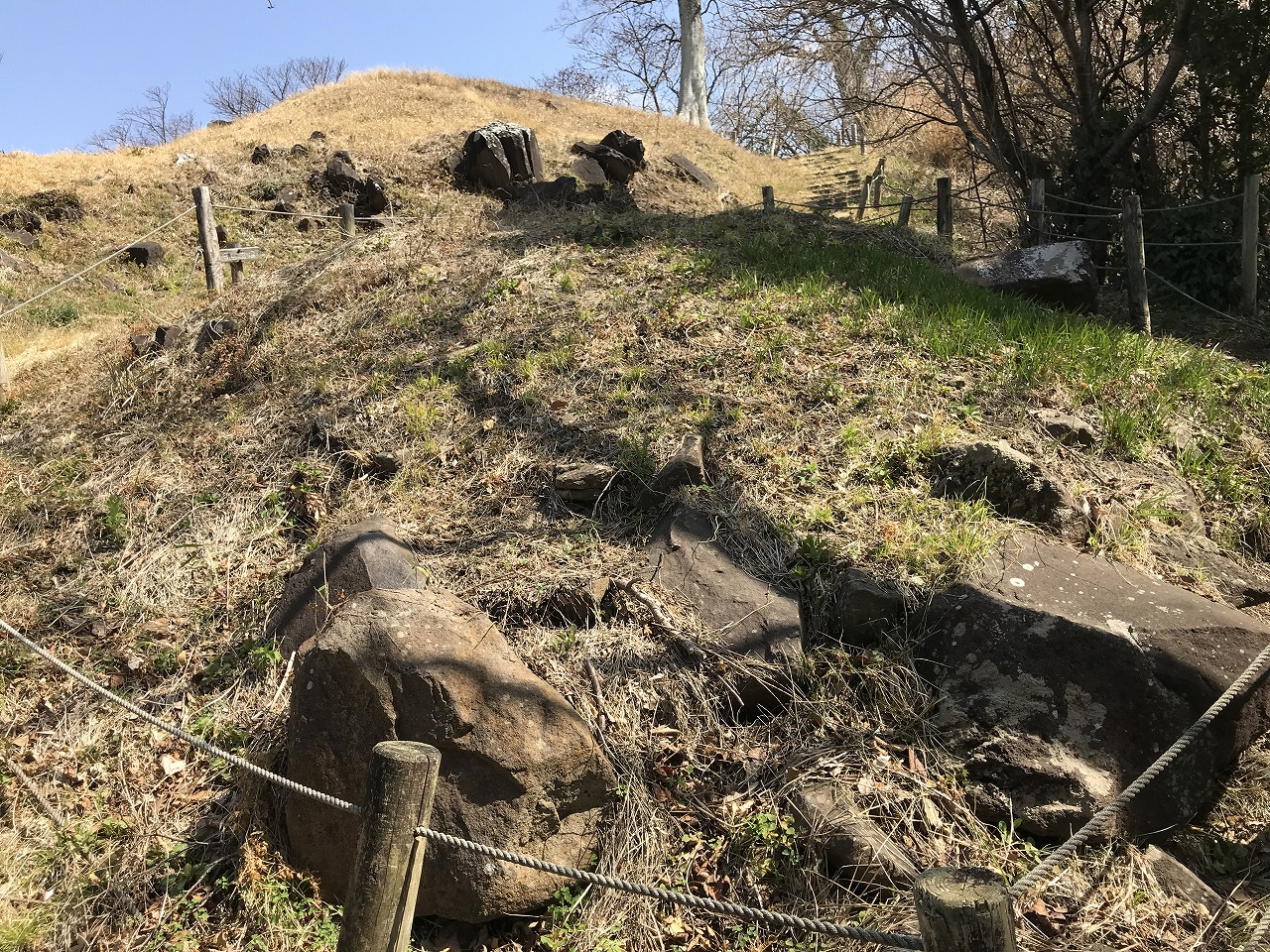
Itasungō Kofun No.1

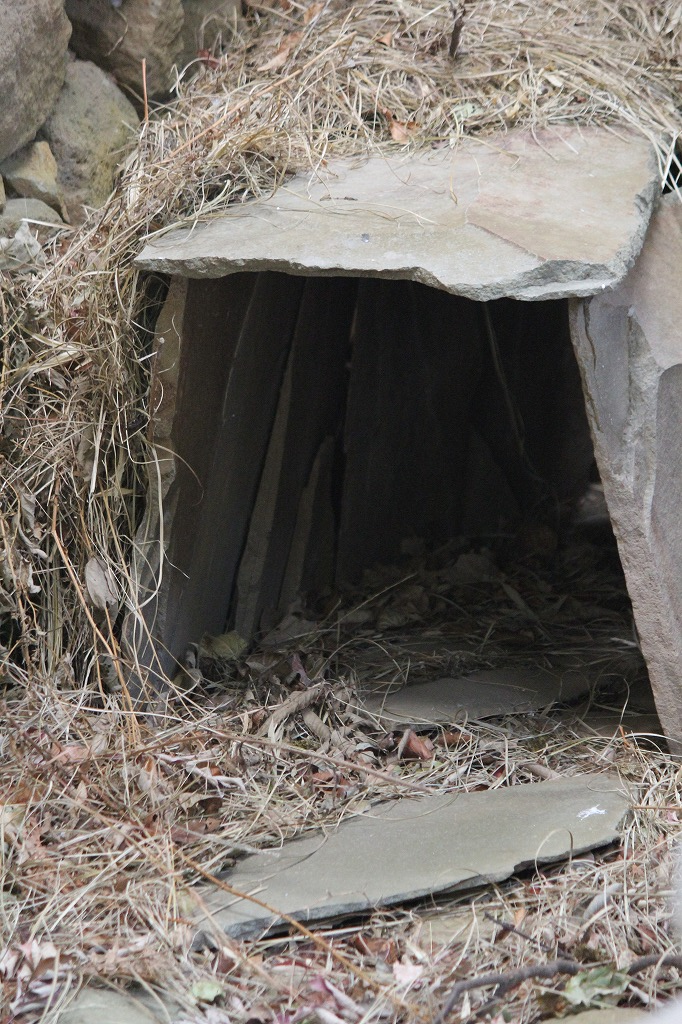
Itasungō Kofun No.18 Burial chamber

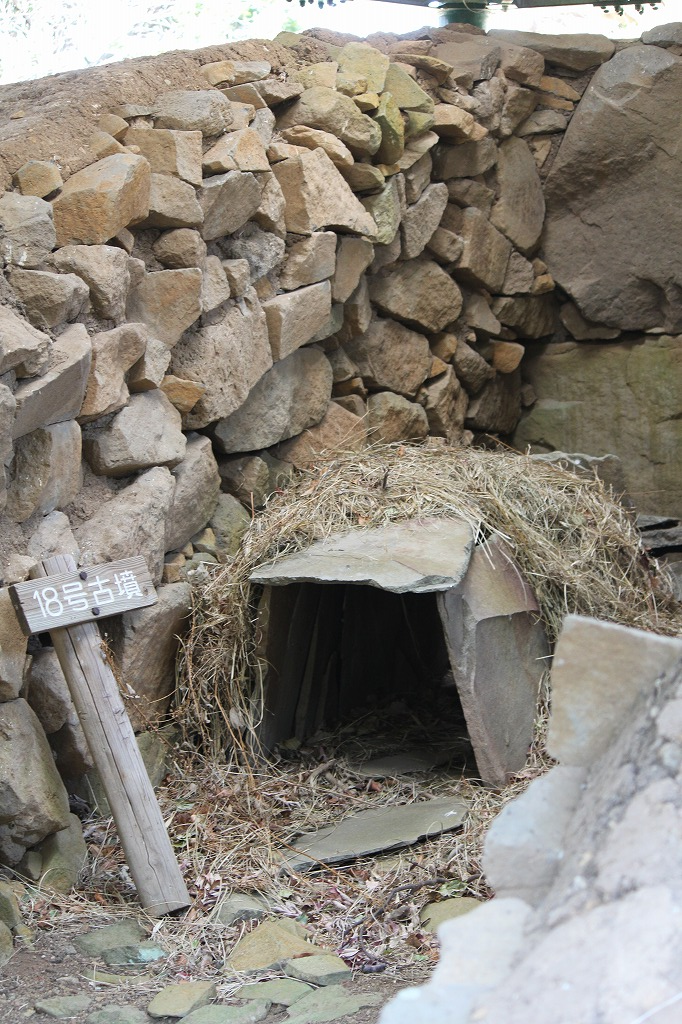
Itasungō Kofun No.18 Burial chamber

== See also ==
- List of Historic Sites of Japan (Shizuoka)
