= Kitaema Cave Tombs =

- 北江間横穴群 (Japanese)
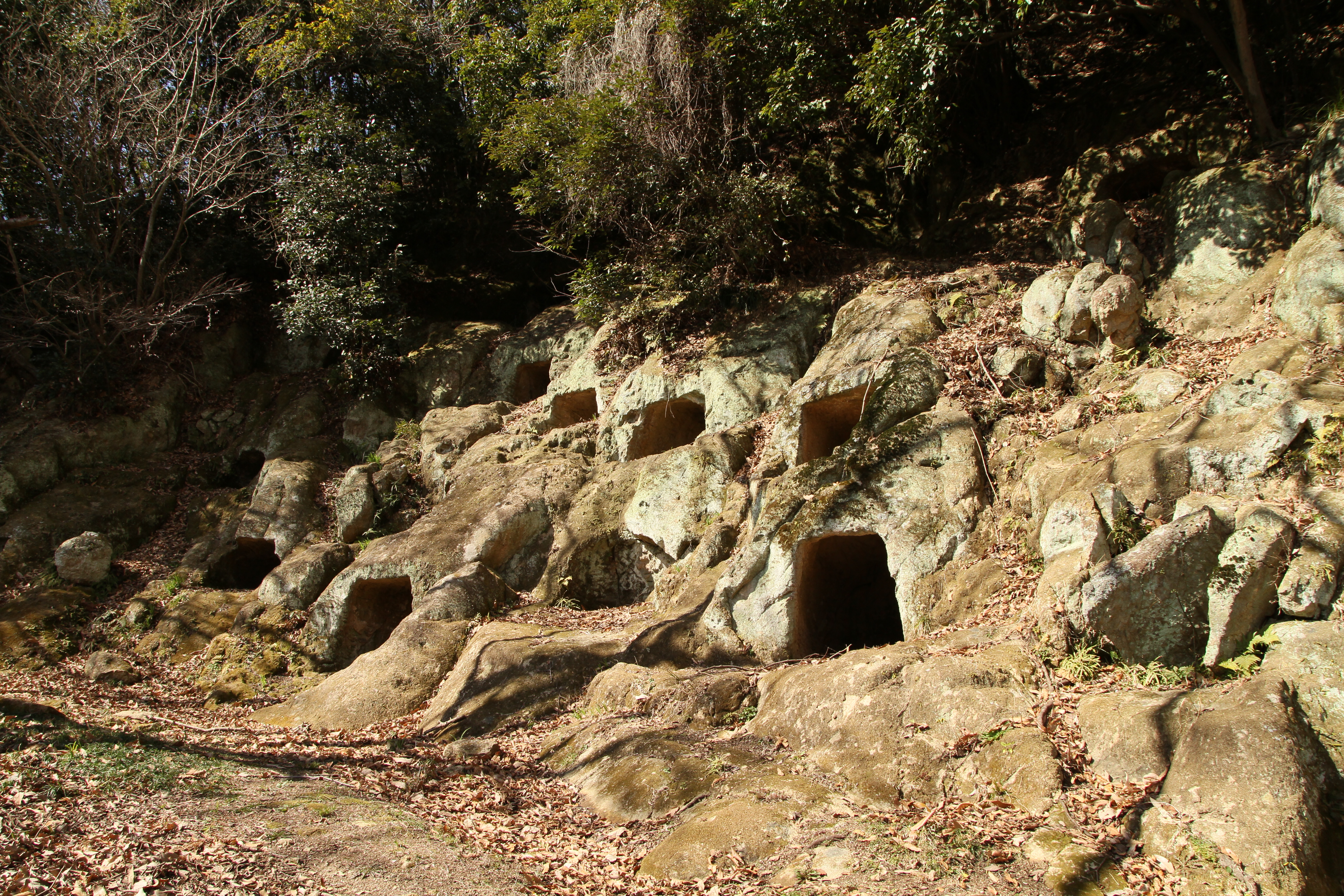
- Kitaema Yokoana-kofun

- Kitaema Yokoana-kofun Kitaema Cave Tombs (Japan)
- 35°03′17″N 138°55′13″E
- Type: grave
- Periods: Kofun period
- Location: Izunokuni, Shizuoka, Japan
- Region: Tōkai region

Site notes
- Public access: Yes

The Kitaema Cave Tombs (北江間横穴群, Kitaema Yokoana-kofun gun) is an archaeological site containing the ruins of a final Kofun period to early Nara period necropolis in what is now part of the city of Izunokuni, Shizuoka, in the Tōkai region of Japan. The site was designated a National Historic Site of Japan in 1976, with the area under protection expanded in 1985.

== Overview ==
The Kitaema site is north of the city center of Izunokuni on the banks of the Kano River. The site consists of ten corridor-type kofun (横穴式石室, yokoana-shiki sekishitsu) with burial chambers excavated into the side of a tuff hill to the west (the "Daishiyama group") and a second set of more than 40 tombs to the east (the "Daihoku" group), and includes stone house-shaped sarcophagus made from hollowed-out stone. The largest of these cave tombs extends 6.5 meters (21 ft) into the hillside, but the average is one to three meters (3 to 10 ft), with a height of approximately one meter (3 ft). The graves indicate a period of transition between burial and cremation.

One grave contained a 1200-year-old stone coffin shaped like a house and inscribed "Wakato-nari", which was presumably the name of the person associated with the tomb. This coffin was designated a National Important Cultural Property in 1993. The National Historic Site designation was expanded due to additional finds in 1985.

The site is approximately 15 minutes by foot from Izu Hakone Railway's Izu-Nagaoka Station.

== Gallery ==
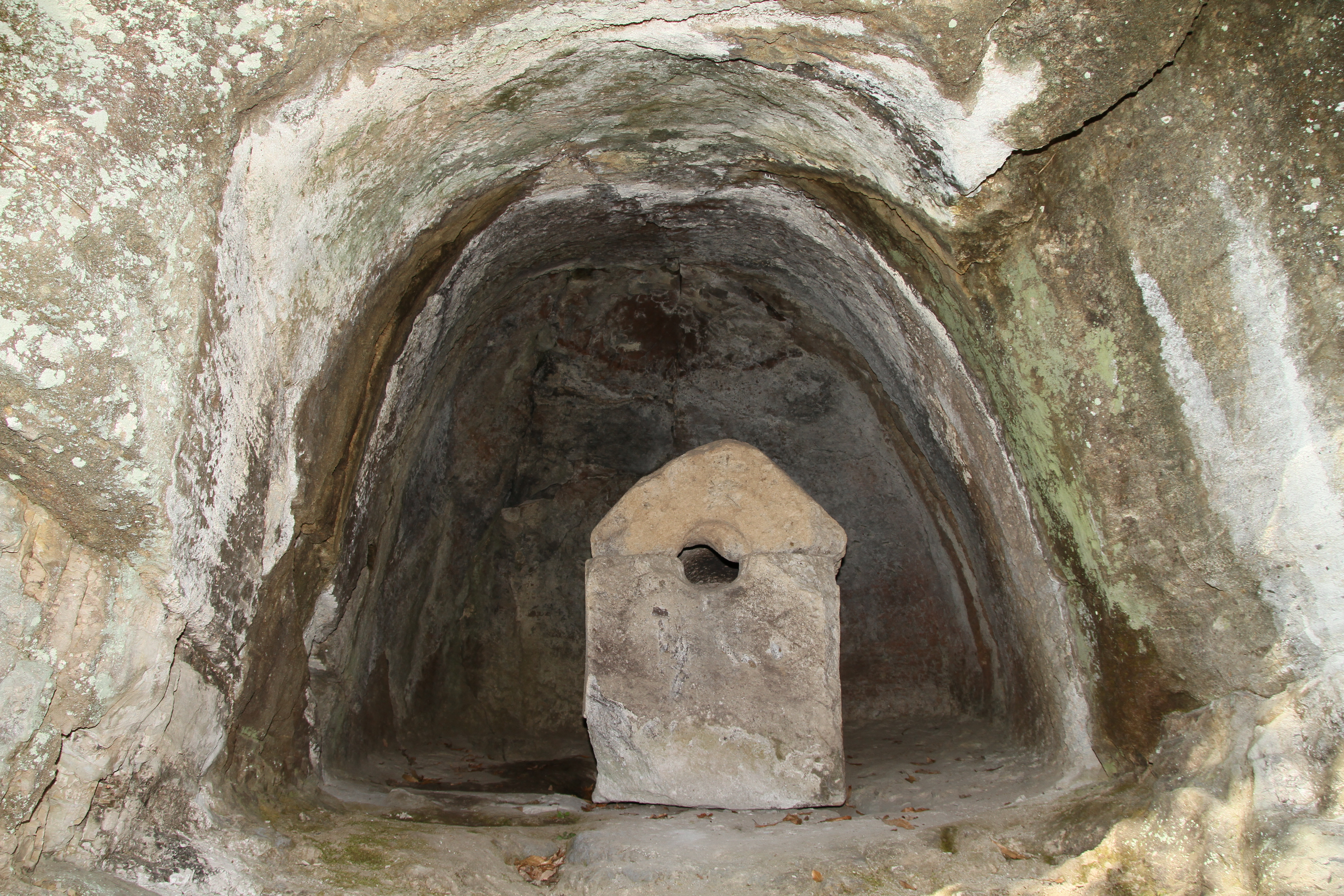
Interior of Cave-tomb No.1

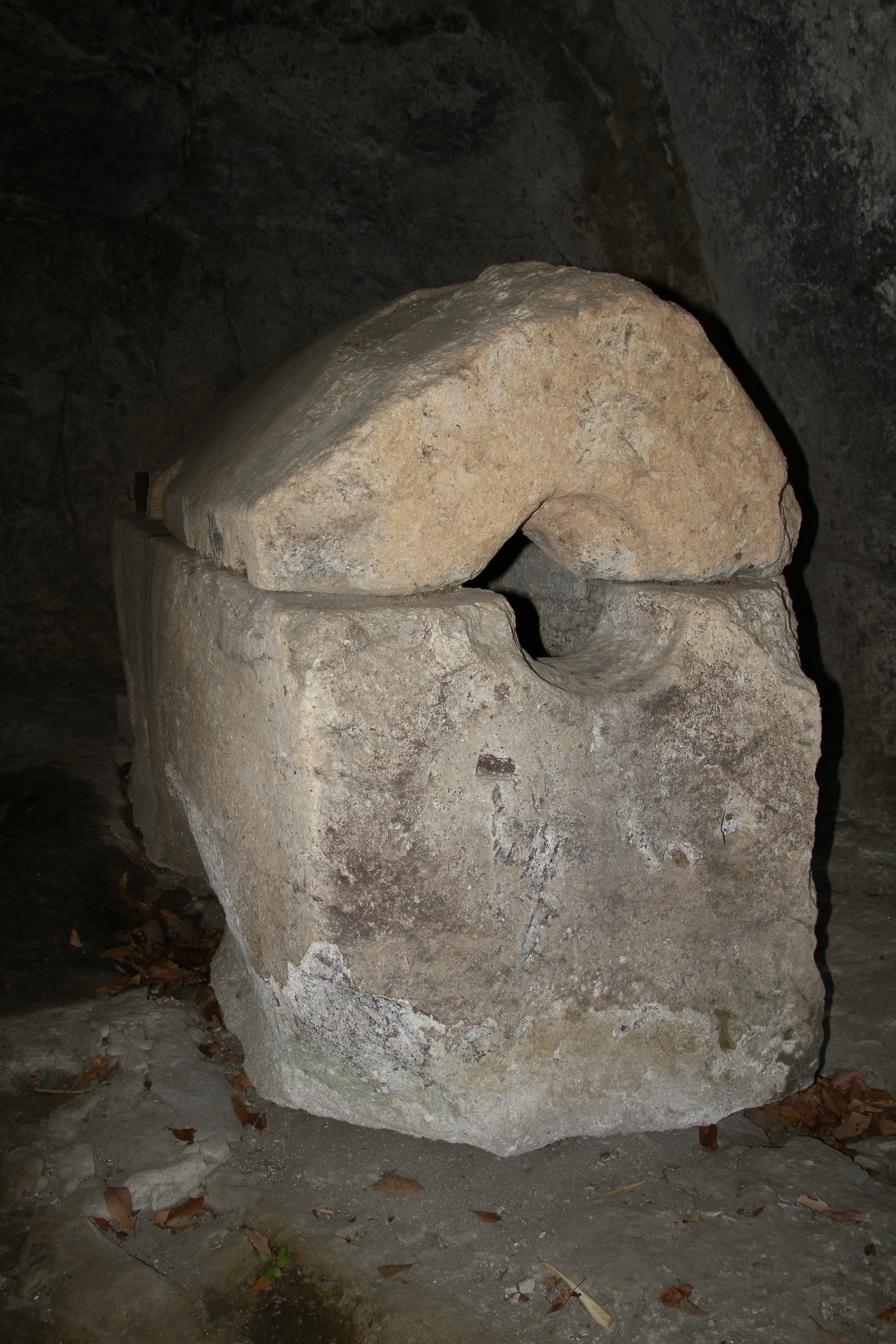
Sarcophagus from Cave-tomb No.1

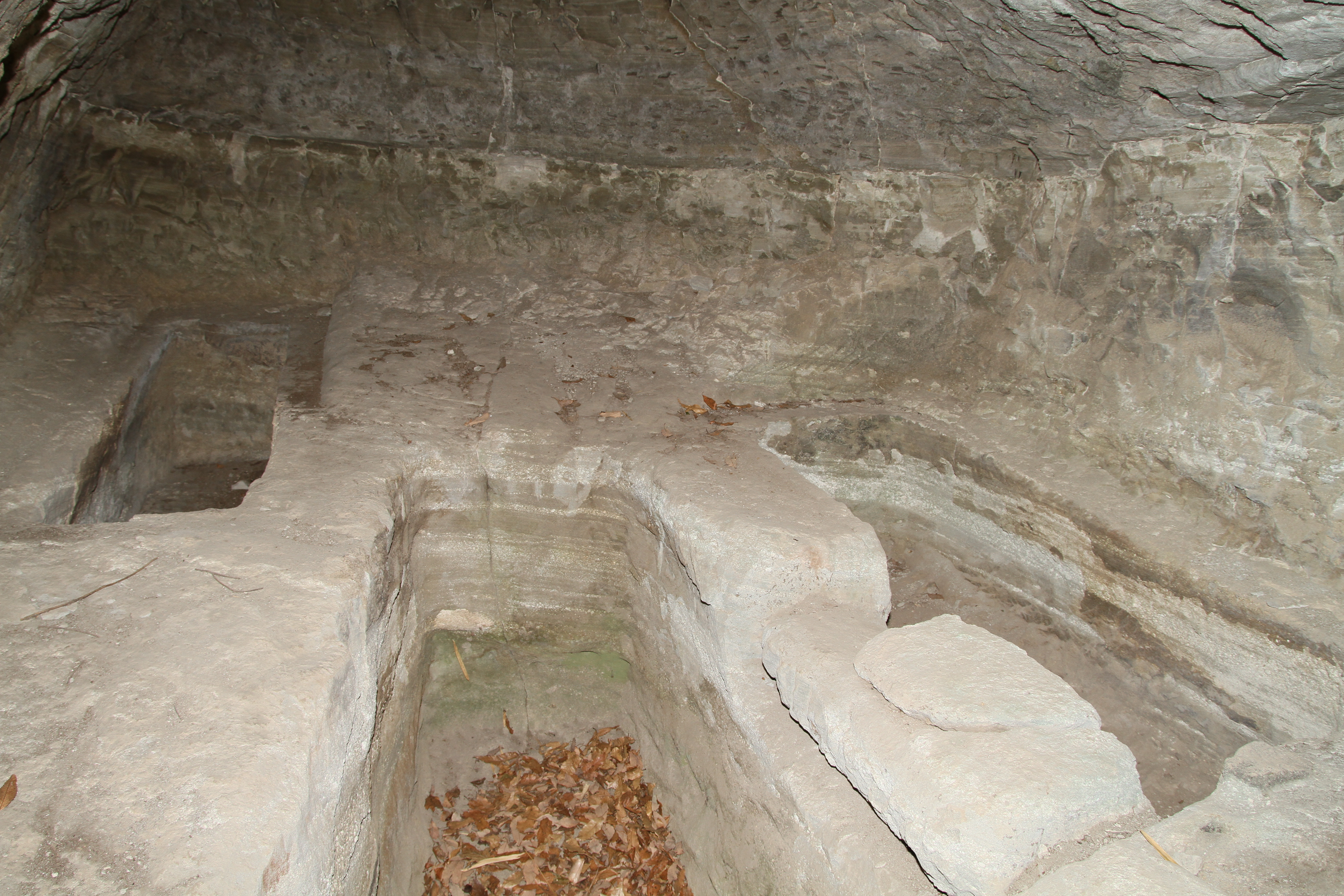
Interior of Cave-tomb No.8

== See also ==
- List of Historic Sites of Japan (Shizuoka)
