= Teradani Chōshizuka Kofun =

Kofun burial mound in Japan

- 寺谷銚子塚古墳 (Japanese)
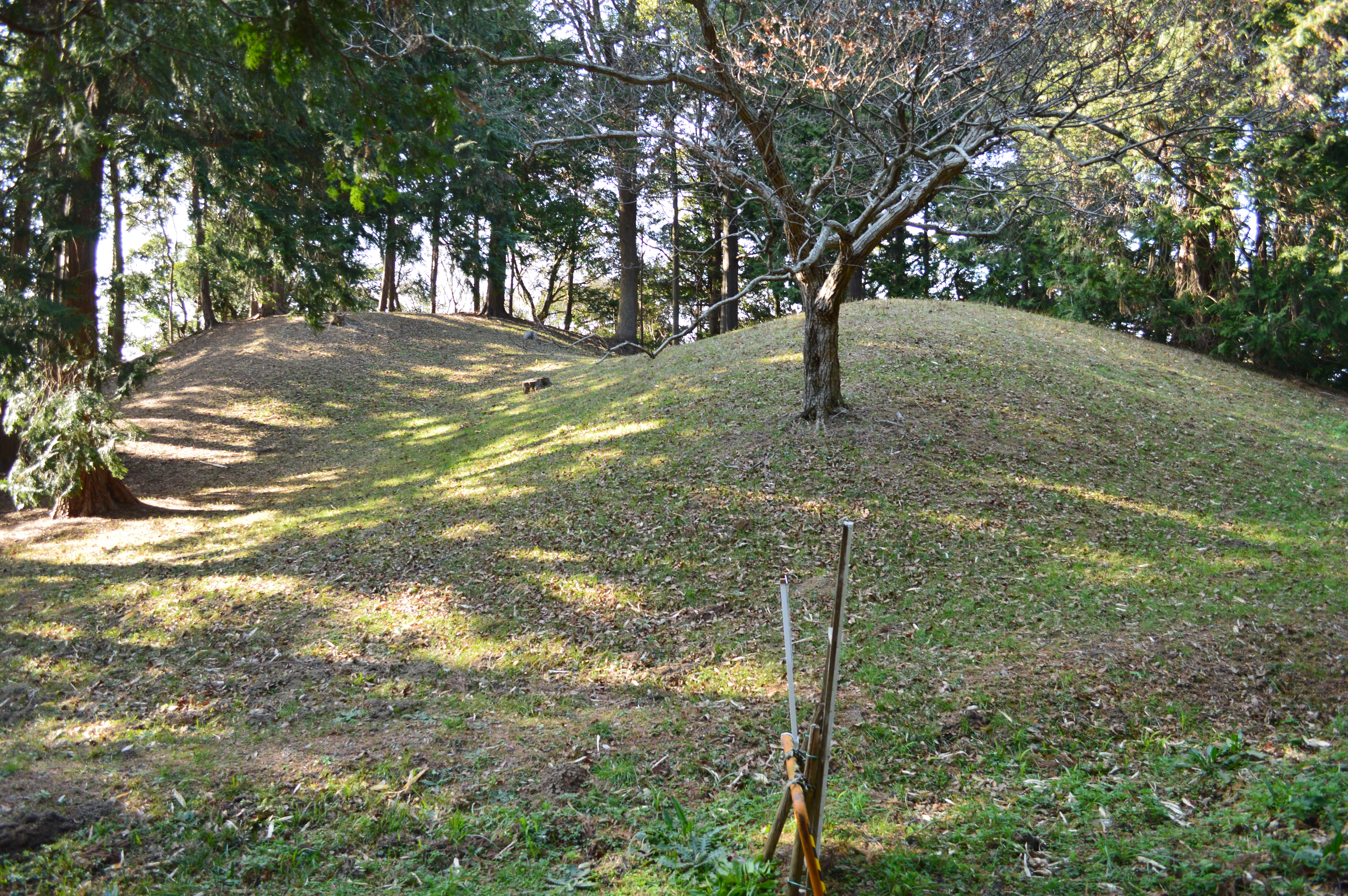
- Kochoshizuka Kofun, adjacent to the Teradani Chōshizuka Kofun

- Teradani Chōshizuka Kofun Teradani Chōshizuka Kofun (Japan)
- 34°46′47″N 137°50′21″E
- Type: kofun
- Periods: Kofun period
- Location: Iwata, Shizuoka, Japan
- Region: Tōkai region

History
- Built: 4th century AD

Site notes
- Public access: Yes (no public facilities)
- National Historic Site of Japan

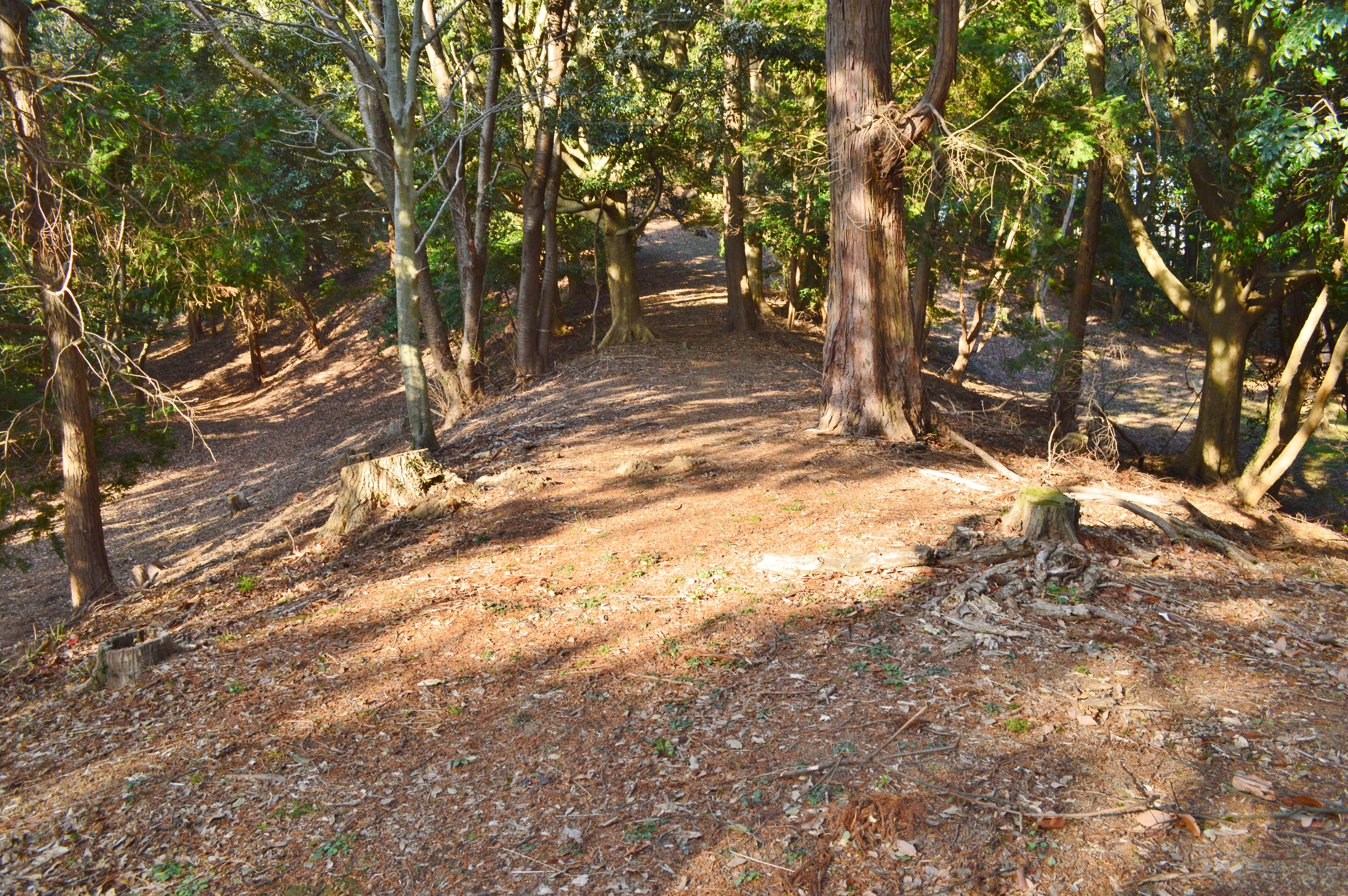
Teradani Chōshizuka Kofun

The Teradani Chōshizuka Kofun (寺谷銚子塚古墳) is a kofun burial mound located in the Teradani neighborhood of the city of Iwata, Shizuoka in the Tōkai region of Japan. The site was designated a National Historic Site of Japan in 1956, with the area under protection enlarged in 1979.

== Overview ==
The Teradani Chōshizuka Kofun is located on the Iwatabara Plateau on the east bank of the Tenryū River. It is a zenpō-kōen-fun (前方後円墳), which is shaped like a keyhole, having one square end and one circular end, when viewed from above. The tumulus is orientated south-south west and has a total length of 108 meters, making it the third largest found in Shizuoka Prefecture. The anterior rectangular portion is 52 meters wide with a height of 4.5 meters, and the posterior domed portion has a diameter of 58 meters and height of eight meters. There are traces of a surrounding ten-meter wide moat and earthen embankment. The slopes of the mound were covered with fukiishi paving stones.

The tumulus was excavated in 1880 and 1898 and was found to contain a vermilion-painted vertical burial chamber with a length of three meters. Grave goods included an ancient triangular-edged Shinju-kyo Bronze mirror with a design of mythical animals, pottery and bronze artifacts, which dated the tomb to the middle to end of the 4th century AD.

The site is a ten-minute walk from the "Choshi Tsukaguchi" bus stop on the Entetsu Bus from Iwata Station on the Tōkaidō Main Line.

Teradani Chōshizuka Kofun

Total length
108 meters:
Anterior rectangular portion
80 meters wide x 4.5 meters high
Posterior circular portion
60 meter diameter x 8 meters high

The surrounding area contains many other ancient kofun, which are not covered by the National Historic Site protection, with the exception of the Kochōzuka Kofun, a smaller "two-conjoined rectangle"-shaped tomb immediately adjacent to the Teradani Chōzuka Kofun. This tomb has a length of 54 meters, orientated east. It also has a ten-meter wide moat, which partly intersects that of the Teradani Chōzuka Kofun. This tumulus has not been excavated, and its interior details is unknown, but it is believed to predate the Teradani Chōzuka Kofun.

Kochōzuka Kofun

Total length
48 meters:
Anterior portion
19 meters x 2.7 meters high
Posterior portion
25 meters square x 5 meters high

== See also ==
- List of Historic Sites of Japan (Shizuoka)
