= Sengen Kofun =

Kofun burial mound in Fuji

- 浅間古墳 (Japanese)
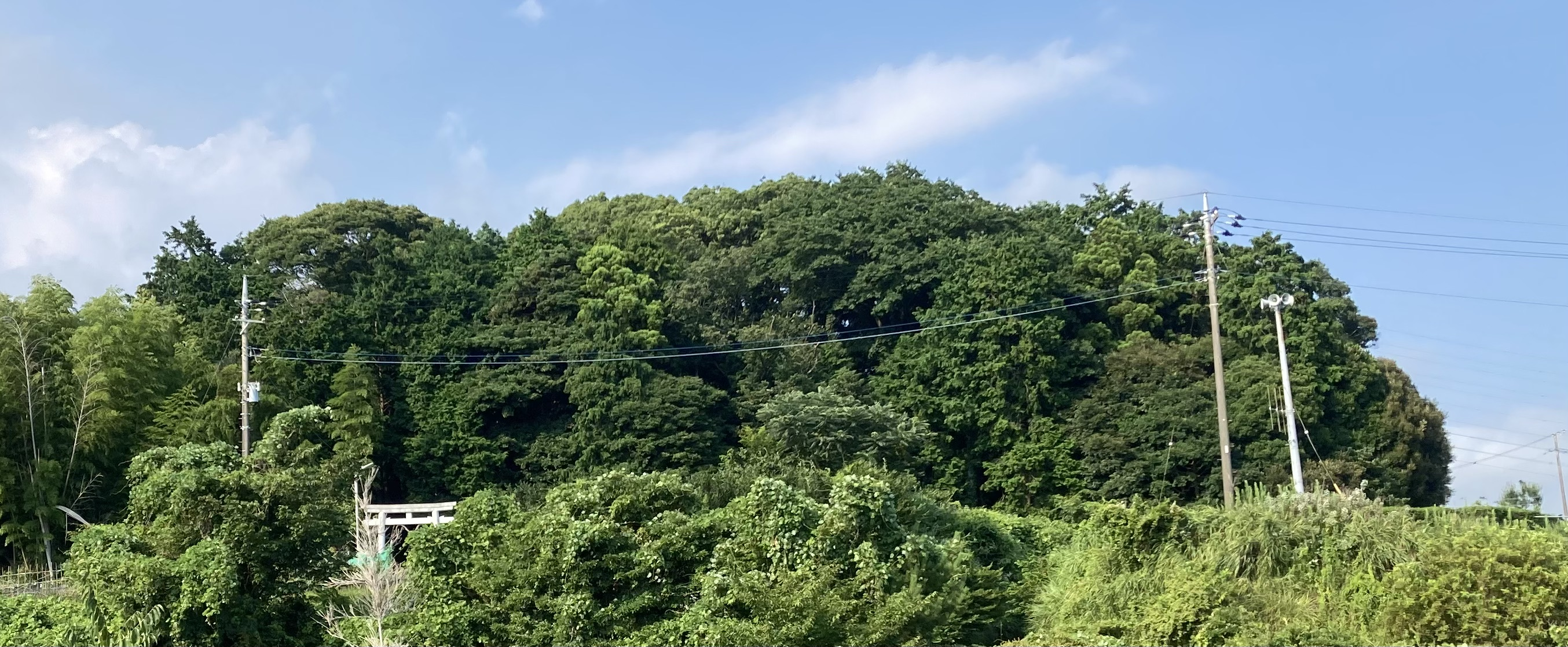
- Sengen Kofun Full view from the south (August 2024) The right side is the front section, and the left side is the rear section.

- Sengen Kofun Sengen Kofun (Japan)
- 35°09′51″N 138°44′48″E
- Type: kofun
- Periods: Kofun period
- Location: Nishimura, Masukawa, Fuji, Shizuoka, Japan
- Region: Tōkai region

History
- Built: late 4th century

Site notes
- Public access: Yes (no facilities)
- National Historic Site of Japan

The Sengen Kofun (浅間古墳) is an early to middle Kofun period burial mound located in the Masukawa neighborhood of the city of Fuji, Shizuoka in the Tōkai region of Japan. It was designated a National Historic Site of Japan in 1957. The name comes from a Sengen Jinja Shinto shrine on its summit. Its official archaeological name is Masukawa I No. 1 Kofun.

== Overview ==
The Sengen Kofun is located on a gently sloping area at the foot of Mount Ashitaka and is part of the larger Suzu Kofun cluster, which consists of more tha 209 known burial mounds. It is a "two conjoined rectangle" type kofun (zenpō-kōhō-fun (前方後方墳)) orientated to the southeast. It was constructed using the natural topography at the 53 meter contour line of the hill, which made it a prominent landmark when viewed from Suruga Bay.

Its total length is 97 meters and maximum width is 60 meters, making it the largest in eastern Shizuoka Prefecture. The tumulus was surrounded by a moat with a width of 10 to 15 meters. While the entire surface of the mound was once covered in fukiishi revetment stones, there are differing opinions on the presence or absence of haniwa clay figures.

Per a Lidar survey conducted in 2020, it was confirmed that the tumulus had two tiers in its posterior and a single tier in its anterior portion. A flat terrace protruding from the posterior portion, which is not visible to the naked eye was also found. The survey also reconfirmed that the height of the tumulus differs significantly between its north side (mountain side) and south side (sea side), making it clear that the tumulus is made to look larger when viewed from the sea side.Because no archaeological excavation has been conducted, the burial facility is unknown, but the Lidar survey suggests the presence of a vertical shaft stone chamber without a ceiling stone or a burial facility resembling a clay sarcophagus.

There are various theories about the person buried there, including the theory that it is the tomb of the king of Surugawa or, the kuni no miyatsuko provincial governor of "Tamagawa Province" (which included what is now the cities of Fuji, Numazu and part of Suntō District. The tumulus is estimated to have been constructed in the mid- or late-4th century to early 5th century.

The Sengen Kofun is located approximately seven minutes on foot from the Gakunan Railway Kamiya Station.

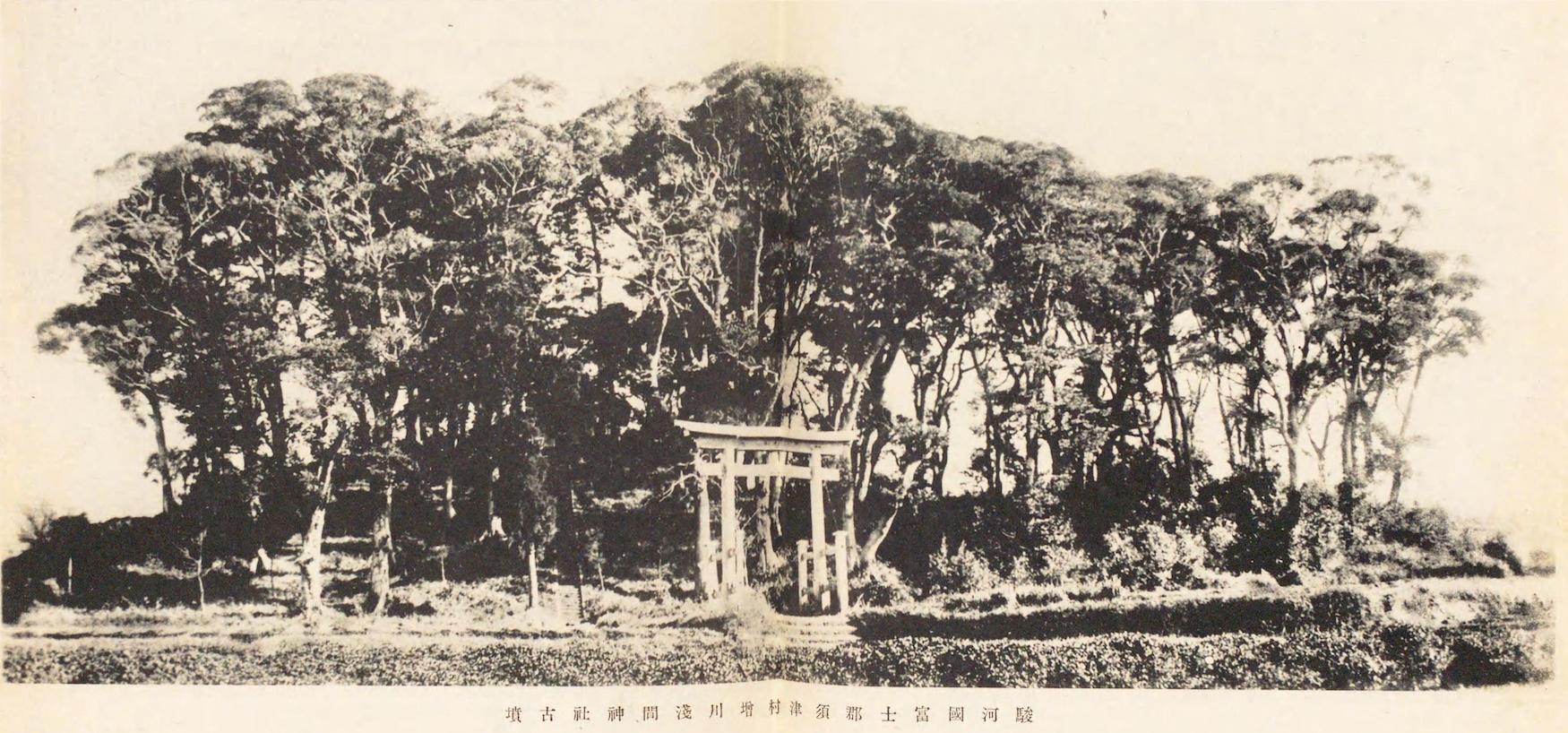
Early 20th century photo

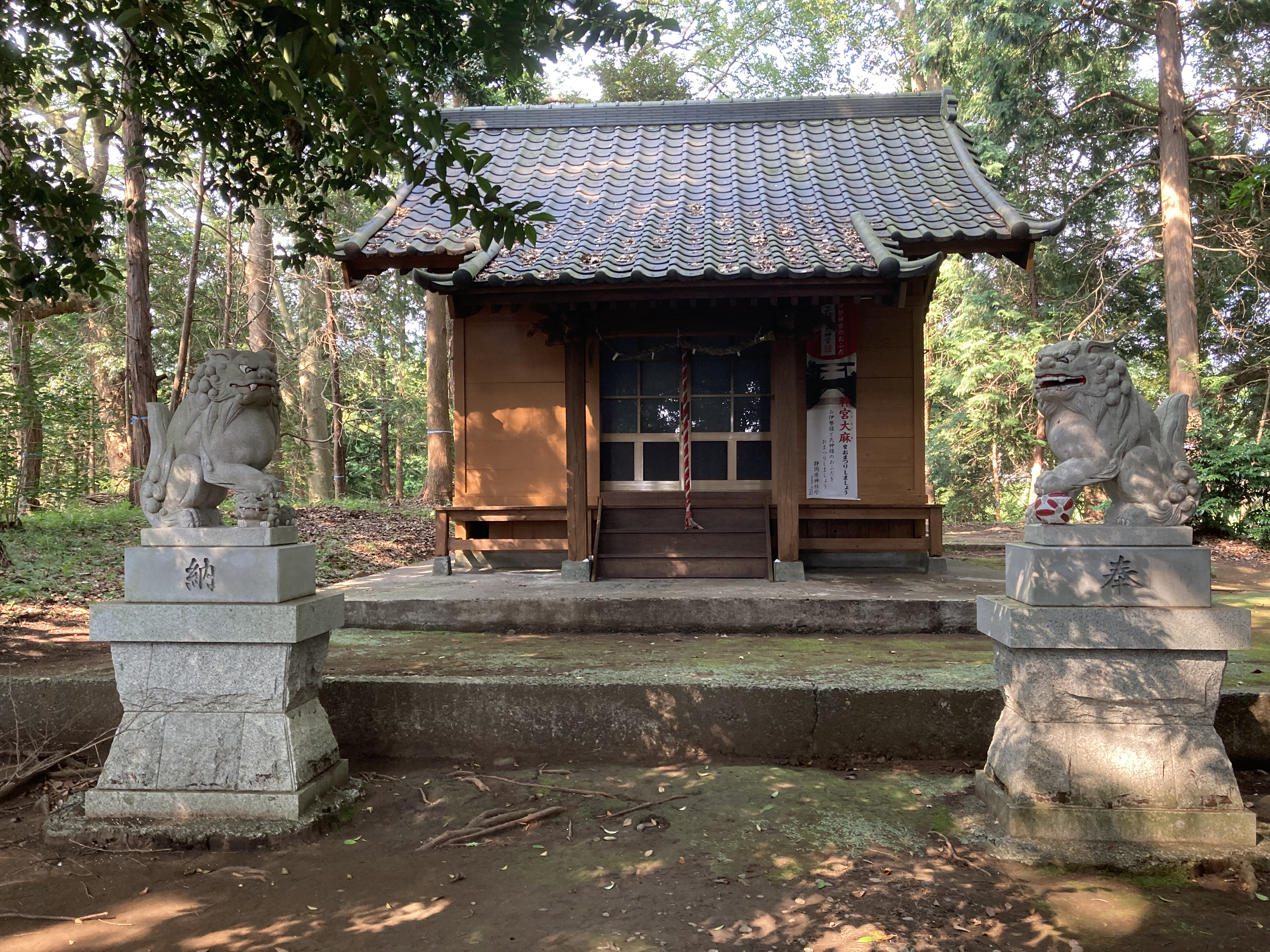
Sengen Jinja

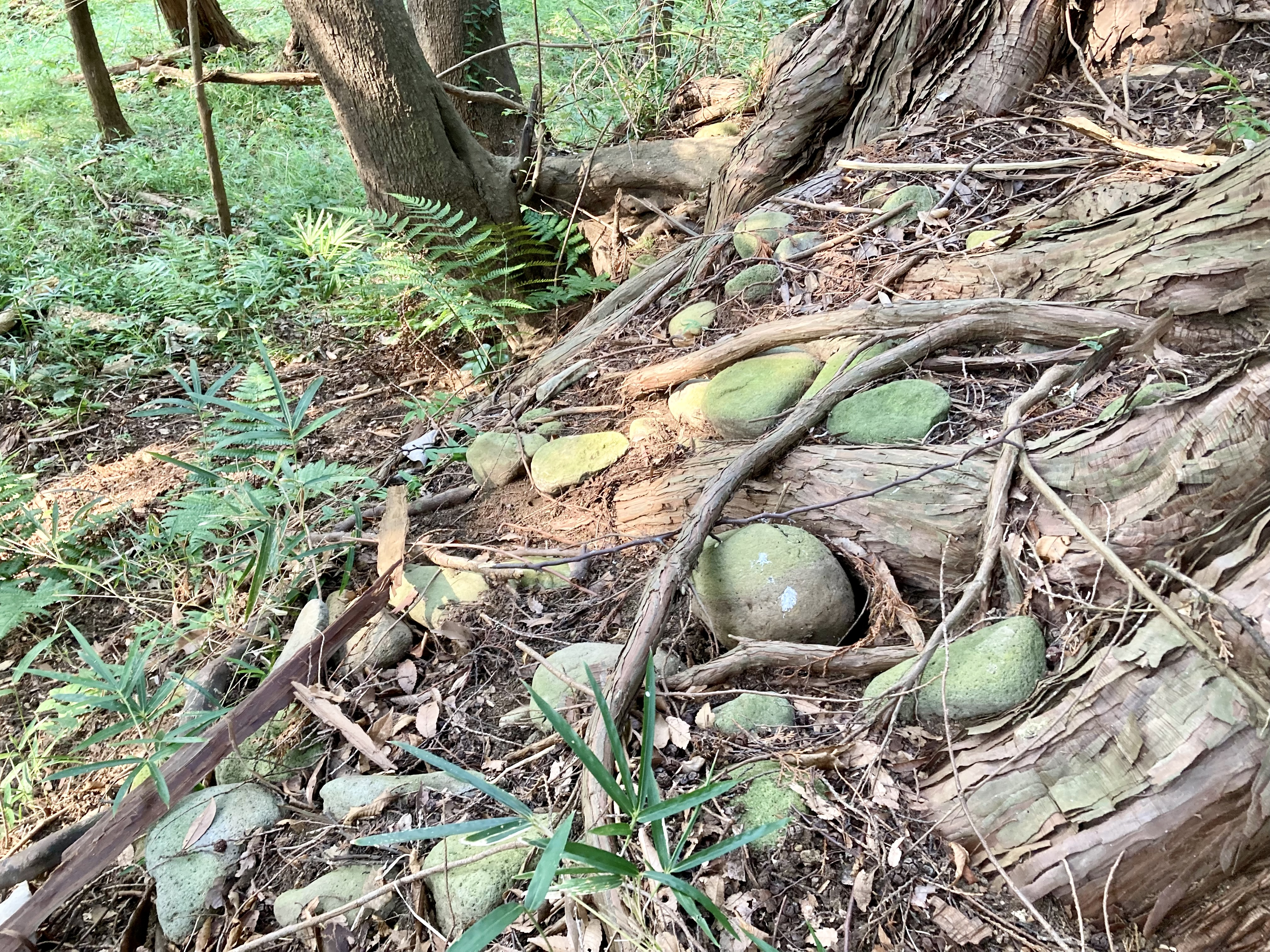
Fukiishi at the Sengen Kofun

== See also ==
- List of Historic Sites of Japan (Shizuoka)
