= Otodome Falls =

- 音止めの滝
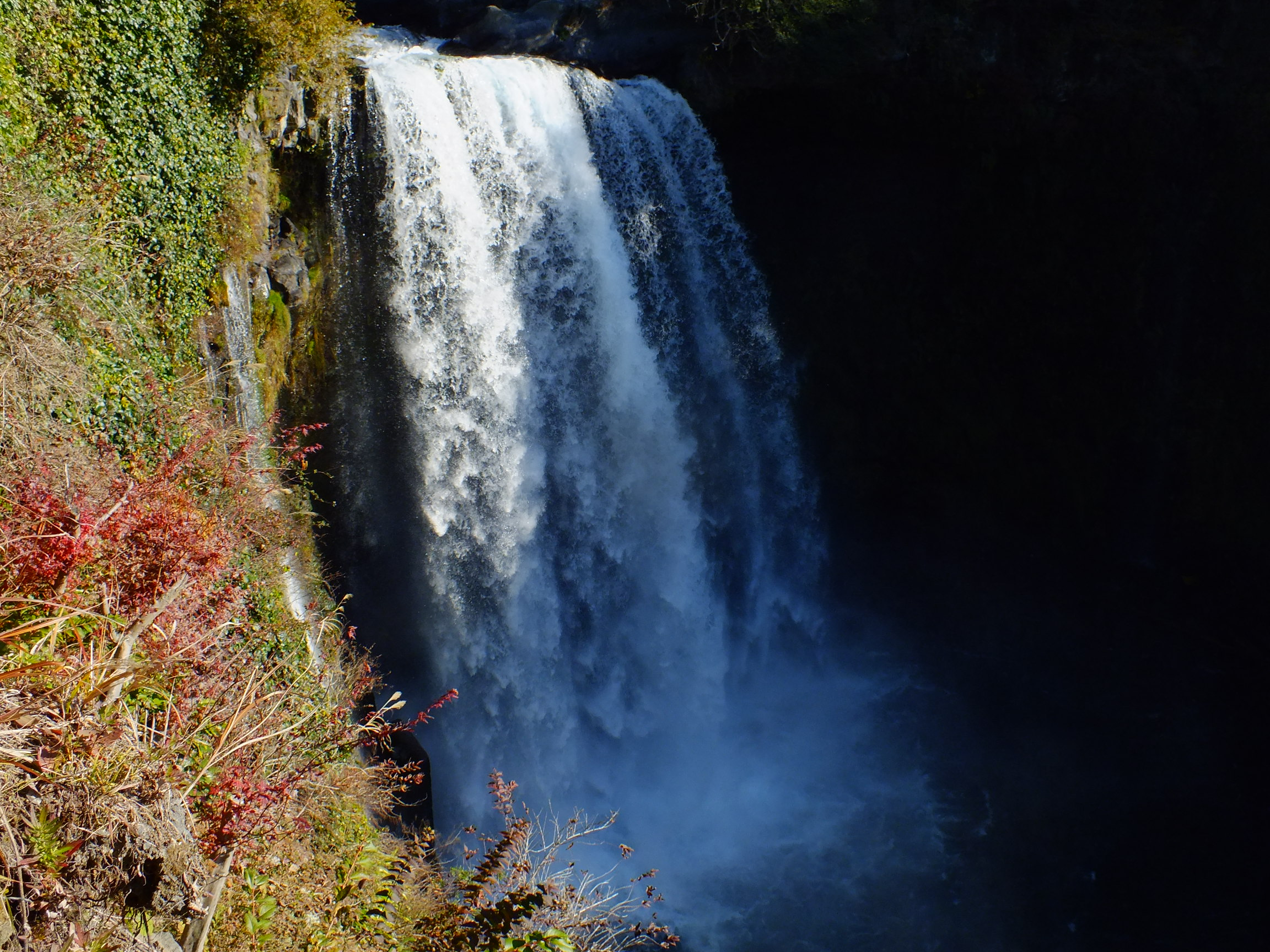

- Location within Japan
- Location: Fujinomiya, Shizuoka Prefecture, Japan
- Coordinates: 35°18′44″N 138°35′21″E
- Type: block
- Total height: 25 m (82 ft)
- Average width: 5 m (16 ft)

Otodome Falls (音止めの滝, Otodome-no-taki) is a waterfall in Fujinomiya, Shizuoka Prefecture, near Mount Fuji, Japan. This waterfall with a height of 25 m (82 ft) is part of the Fuji-Hakone-Izu National Park. Another waterfall, the Shiraito Falls is about a five-minute walk away.

The name "Sound Stopping Waterfall" comes from an episode in the Soga Monogatari story of the Kamakura period. When the Soga brothers accompanied Minamoto no Yoritomo on a hunting expedition to the base of Mount Fuji, they plotted to assassinate one of Yoritomo's retainers, Kudō Tsuketsune, who was the murderer of their father. In order to avoid being overheard, they planned their strategy by the roaring waters of this waterfall.

The Otodome Falls is listed as one of "Japan's Top 100 Waterfalls", in a listing published by the Japanese Ministry of the Environment in 1990.

== See also ==
- List of waterfalls
- List of waterfalls in Japan
