= Ōshikakubo ruins =

Ōshikubo ruins
- 大鹿窪遺跡 (Japanese)
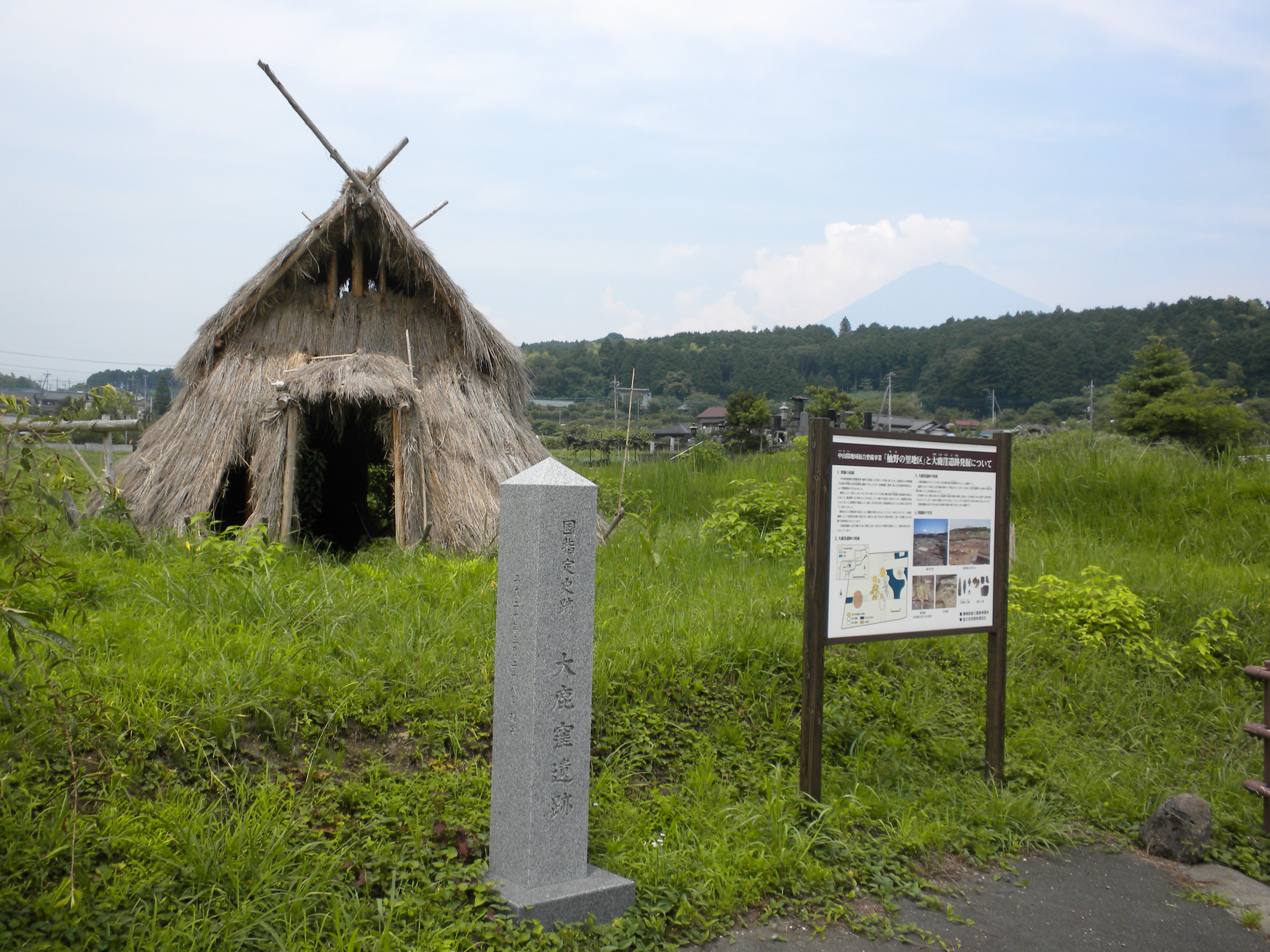
- Ōshikubo ruins

- Ōshikubo ruins Ōshikakubo ruins (Japan)
- 35°14′55.2″N 138°33′43.4″E
- Type: settlement
- Periods: Jōmon period
- Location: Fujinomiya, Shizuoka, Japan
- Region: Tōkai region

Site notes
- Excavation dates: 2001, 2002, 2008, 2016
- Public access: Yes (no public facilities)

The Ōshikubo ruins (大鹿窪遺跡, Ōshikubo iseki) is an archaeological site containing the ruins of an Incipient Jōmon period settlement located in the Oshikakubo neighborhood of the city of Fujinomiya, Shizuoka in the Tōkai region of Japan. The site was designated a National Historic Site of Japan in 2008.

== Overview ==
The Ōshikubo site is located in the former town of Shibakawa, Shizuoka on the gentle slope of the Habuna hill surrounded by lava flows from Mount Fuji. The site was discovered in conjunction with field maintenance on the left bank of the Shiba River, which flows from north to south on the border of the site. The site is located just above the Shibakawa lava flow, which originates from Mount Fuji, and which covers part of the site. This enables a precise dating of the site, as part of the dwellings are built on top of a lava flow which occurred 17,000 years ago, and are covered by a second flow which occurred 13,000 years ago.

The site was found to contain the remnants of 14 pit dwellings, arranged around a horseshoe-shaped plaza. Each dwelling has a hearth pit at the center, some of which were found to contain carbonized grains. The excavated remains included some 26,000 artifacts, centering on shards of Jōmon pottery shards, stone tools for hunting and other and stone implements, such as millstones for grinding grain and nuts.

Although earlier sites have been identified, the Ōshikubo ruins is the oldest Incipient Jōmon period (12,000 to 15,000 years ago) settlement yet discovered with pit dwellings, as other contemporary ruins were typically cave dwellings. This period is at the end of the last ice age when the ecosystem of animals and plants is changing rapidly and significantly due to warming temperatures. The Jōmon population had developed earthenware cooking pots and began to rely more on collecting plants and hunting fish and animals from fixed dwelling settlements. The foundations of some of the pit dwellings at this site overlap, indicating that the site was used over a long period of time.

The site is located about 15 minutes by car from Fujinomiya Station on the JR East Minobu Line. The ruins are currently backfilled and buried about one to two meters below the surface, although the site has a stone marker, information placard and a reconstruction of a faux pit dwelling.

== See also ==
- List of Historic Sites of Japan (Shizuoka)
