= Shiraito Falls =

- 白糸の滝
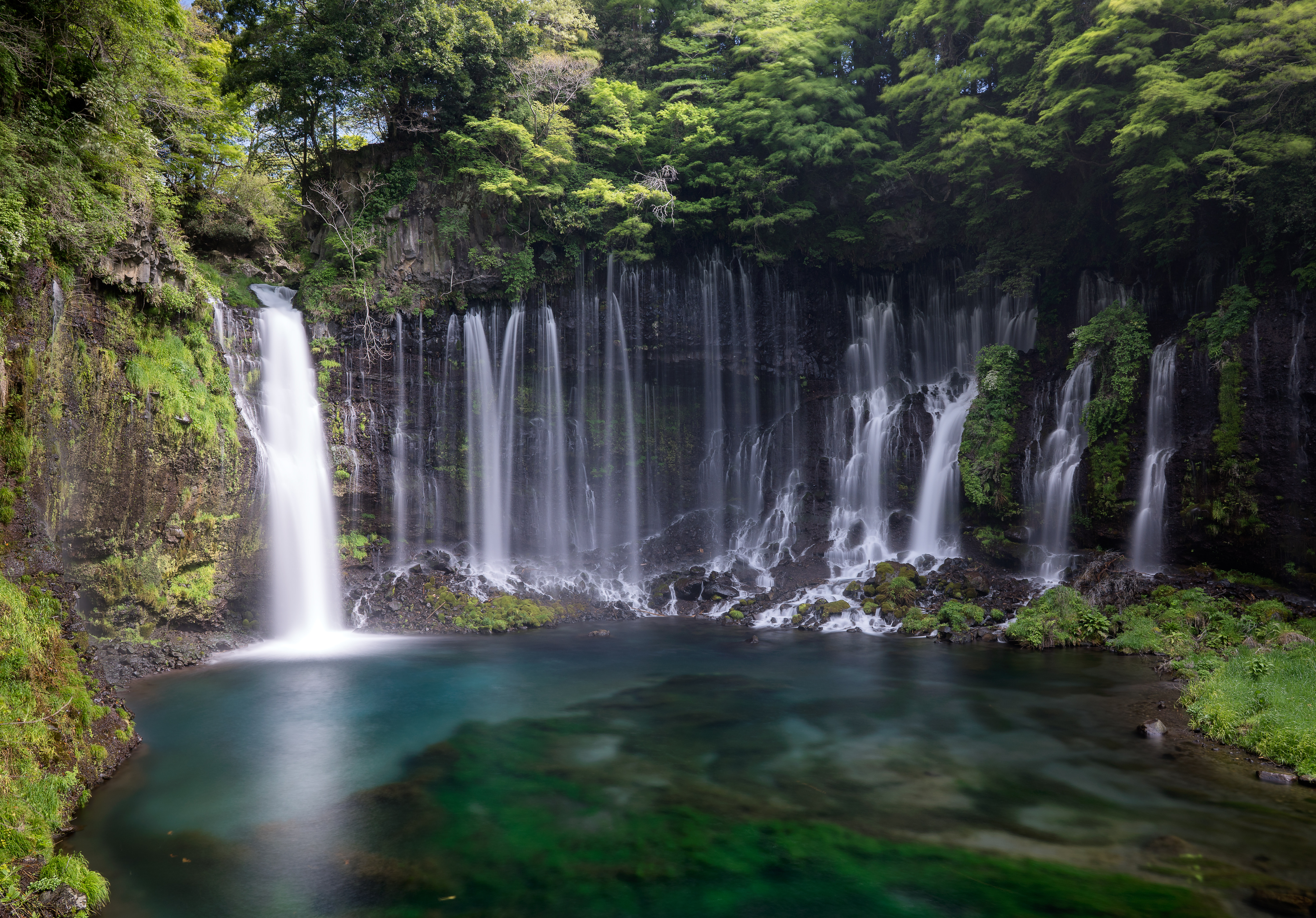

- Location within Shizuoka Prefecture Location within Japan
- Location: Fujinomiya, Shizuoka Prefecture, Japan
- Coordinates: 35°18′45″N 138°35′20″E
- Type: multiple fan
- Total height: 20 m (66 ft)
- Average width: 200 m (660 ft)

Shiraito Falls (白糸の滝, Shiraito-no-taki) is a waterfall in Fujinomiya, Shizuoka Prefecture, near Mount Fuji, Japan.

== History ==
The Shiraito falls are part of Fuji-Hakone-Izu National Park and have been protected since 1936 as a Japanese Natural Monument.

In 2013 the waterfall was added to the World Heritage List as part of the Fujisan Cultural Site.

== Religious significance ==
The falls, with a height of 20 metres (66 ft), were regarded as sacred under the Fuji cult.

== Lists ==
The Shiraito Falls is listed as one of "Japan’s Top 100 Waterfalls", in a listing published by the Japanese Ministry of the Environment in 1990. It was also selected by the Tokyo Nichi Nichi Shimbun and Osaka Mainichi Shimbun as one of the 100 Landscapes of Japan in 1927.

== Surrounding area ==
Another waterfall, the slightly taller Otodome Falls, with a drop of 25 metres (82 ft), is approximately a five-minute walk away.

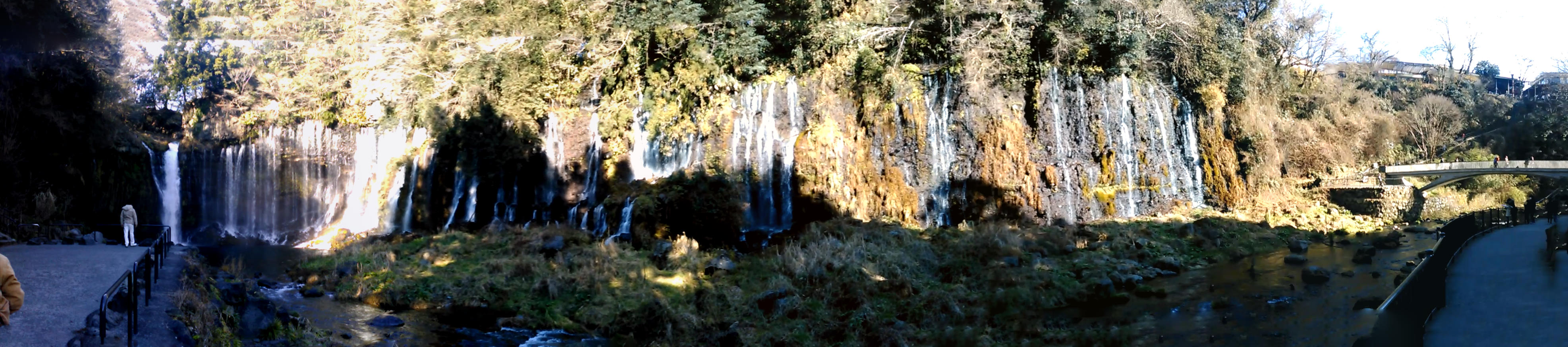

== See also ==
- List of waterfalls
- List of waterfalls in Japan
- List of Places of Scenic Beauty of Japan (Shizuoka)
