= Sengo ruins =

- 千居遺跡 (Japanese)
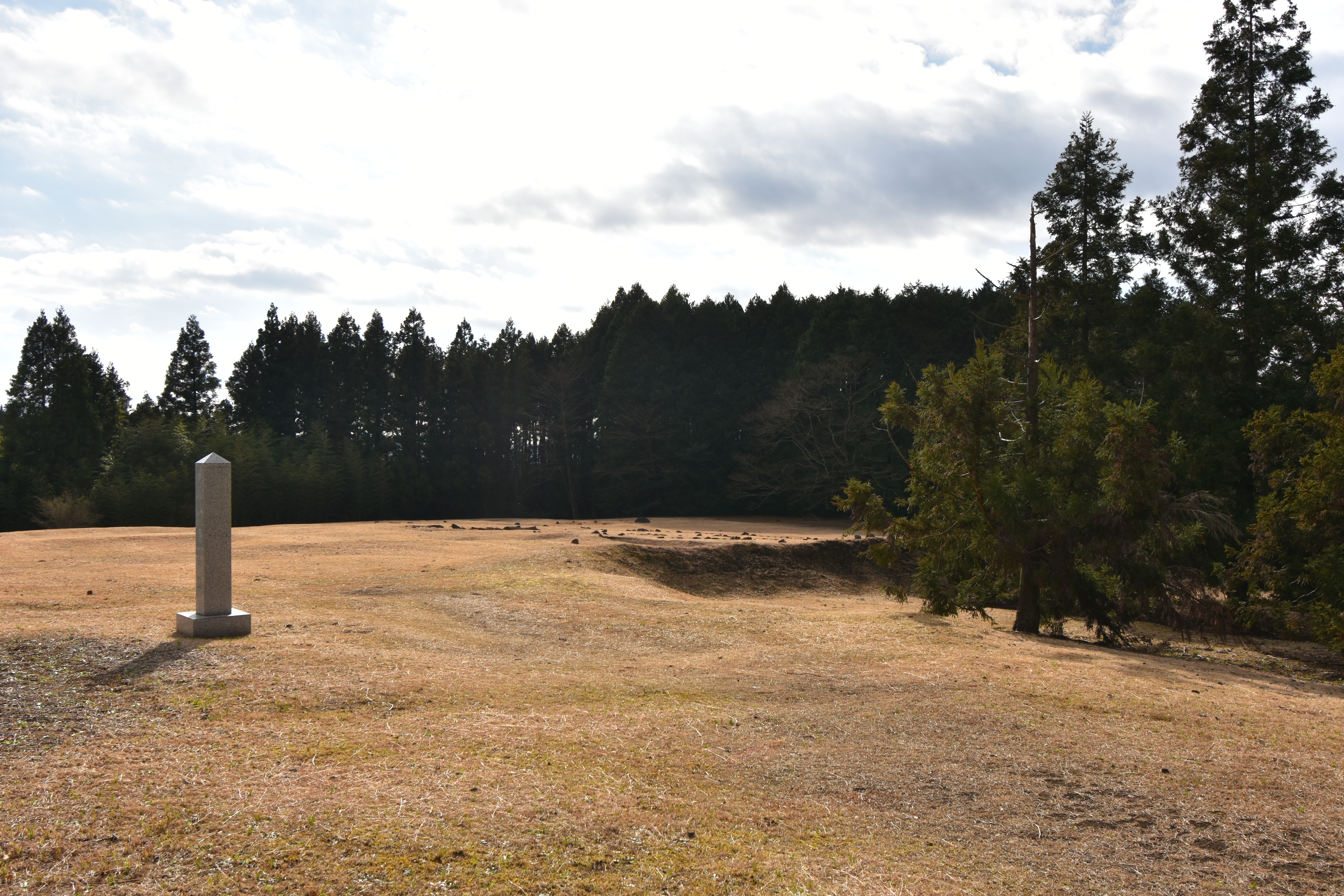
- Sengo ruins

- Sengo ruins Sengo ruins (Japan)
- 35°17′28.5″N 138°35′11.0″E
- Type: settlement
- Periods: Jōmon period
- Location: Fujinomiya, Shizuoka, Japan
- Region: Tōkai region

Site notes
- Public access: No facilities

The Sengo ruins (千居遺跡, Sengo iseki) is an archaeological site containing the ruins of an early through mid-Jōmon period settlement located in the Kamijo neighborhood of the city of Fujinomiya, Shizuoka in the Tōkai region of Japan. The site was designated a National Historic Site of Japan in 1975.

== Overview ==
Sengo site is located at the southeastern foot of Mount Fuji at an altitude of 398 meters along a ridge extending north-to-south. It was discovered before World War II, but was only excavated from the 1970s. The site was found to contain the foundations of twenty pit dwellings arranged in a ring surrounding a 50-meter diameter central plaza. Each pit dwelling was from three to 7.3 meters in diameter, with some of the foundations overlapping, indicating that some buildings had been rebuilt over time. Numerous Jōmon pottery shards were also recovered from the site. The entire site was covered in a layer of ash from the eruptions of Mount Fuji approximately 4000 years ago. Stone circles are placed both within and outside the central plaza. However, early reports of a large stone circle made from piled river stones were later refuted when the monument was found to be an Edo period structure associated with the Fuji cult.

The site is located a short distance from the "Oishiji-mae" bus stop on the Fujikyu Shizuoka Bus from Fujinomiya Station on the JR East Minobu Line.

== See also ==
- List of Historic Sites of Japan (Shizuoka)
