= Shibakawa, Shizuoka =

Shibakawa 芝川町
- Former municipality
- Flag Seal

- Location of Shibakawa in Shizuoka Prefecture

- Location in Japan
- Coordinates: 35°12′N 138°34′E
- Country: Japan
- Region: Chūbu (Tōkai)
- Prefecture: Shizuoka Prefecture
- District: Fuji
- Merged: March 23, 2010 (now part of Fujinomiya)

Area
  - Total: 74.18 km^{2} (28.64 sq mi)

Population (March 31, 2010)
  - Total: 9,238
  - Density: 126/km^{2} (330/sq mi)
- Time zone: UTC+09:00 (JST)
- Website: City of Fujinomiya

Shibakawa (芝川町, Shibakawa-chō) was a town located in Fuji District, Shizuoka Prefecture, Japan.

As of 2009, the town had an estimated population of 9,344 and a density of 126 persons per km^{2}. The total area was 74.18 km^{2}.

On March 23, 2010, Shibakawa was merged into the expanded city of Fujinomiya and thus no longer exists as an independent municipality. Fuji District was dissolved as a result of this merger.

== Geography ==
Shibakawa is located in central Shizuoka Prefecture, in the southwest foothills of Mount Fuji, and is bordered by the Fuji River. The area has a temperate maritime climate with hot, humid summers and mild, cool winters.

=== Surrounding municipalities ===
- Shizuoka Prefecture
  - Shizuoka
  - Fujnomiya
  - Fuji
- Yamanashi Prefecture
  - Nanbu, Yamanashi

== History ==
Shibakawa was located in the far eastern portion of former Suruga Province, and was largely tenryō territory under direct control of the Tokugawa shogunate in the Edo period. During the cadastral reform of the early Meiji period in 1889, the area was reorganized into two villages (Yuzuno, Shibafuji) within Fuji District and one village (Uchibo Village) within Ihara District. Uchibo and Shibafuji merged in 1955 to form Fujihara Village, which was renamed Shibakawa in 1956 after it annexed neighboring Yuzuno Village.

== Economy ==
The economy of Shibakawa is largely based on agriculture, and tourism. The town also serves as a bedroom community for the industrial zones in neighboring Fuji.

== Transportation ==
=== Highways ===
- Japan National Route 52

=== Rail ===
- JR Central - Minobu Line
  - Shibakawa Station, Inako Station
