= Lake Tanuki =

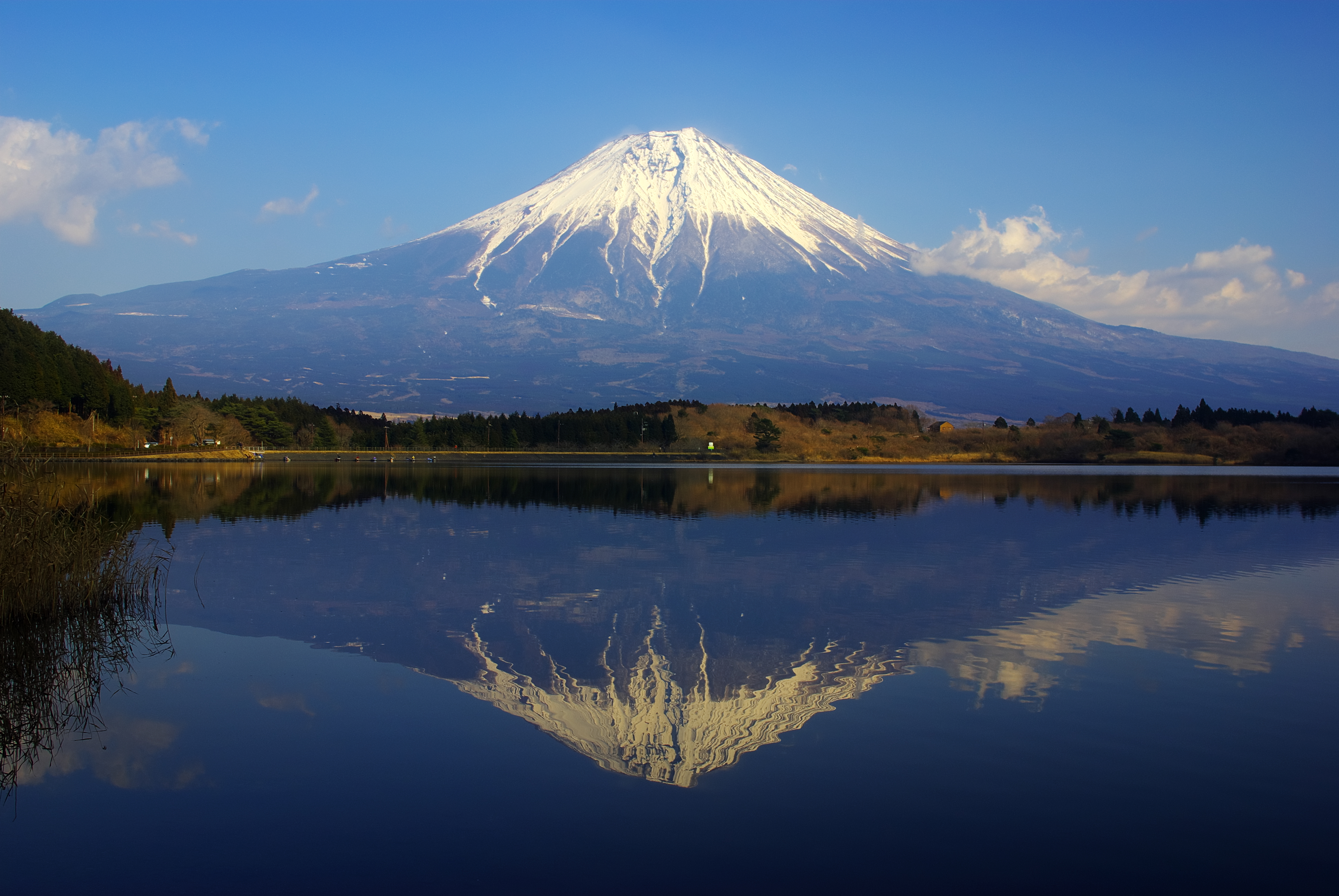

- Location within Shizuoka Prefecture
- Location: Shizuoka Prefecture
- Coordinates: 35°20′37″N 138°33′38″E
- Type: Reservoir
- Basin countries: Japan
- Max. length: 1.0 km (0.62 mi)
- Max. width: 0.5 km (0.31 mi)
- Surface area: 0.312 km^{2} (0.120 sq mi)
- Average depth: 8 m (26 ft)
- Water volume: 0.0012 km^{3} (970 acre⋅ft)
- Surface elevation: 660 m (2,170 ft)
- Settlements: Fujinomiya, Shizuoka

Lake Tanuki (田貫湖, Tanuki-ko) is a lake near Mount Fuji, Japan. It is located in the city of Fujinomiya, Shizuoka Prefecture, and is part of the Fuji-Hakone-Izu National Park.

== History ==
Originally a swampy area, the lake was created in 1935 by diverting the waters of nearby Shiba River to create a reservoir for use in irrigation. The lake is now a popular vacation location, with camp sites, fishing, boating and is noted for its views of Mount Fuji.
