= Yamamiya Sengen Shrine =

Shrine in Japan

Yamamiya Sengen-jinja
- 山宮浅間神社
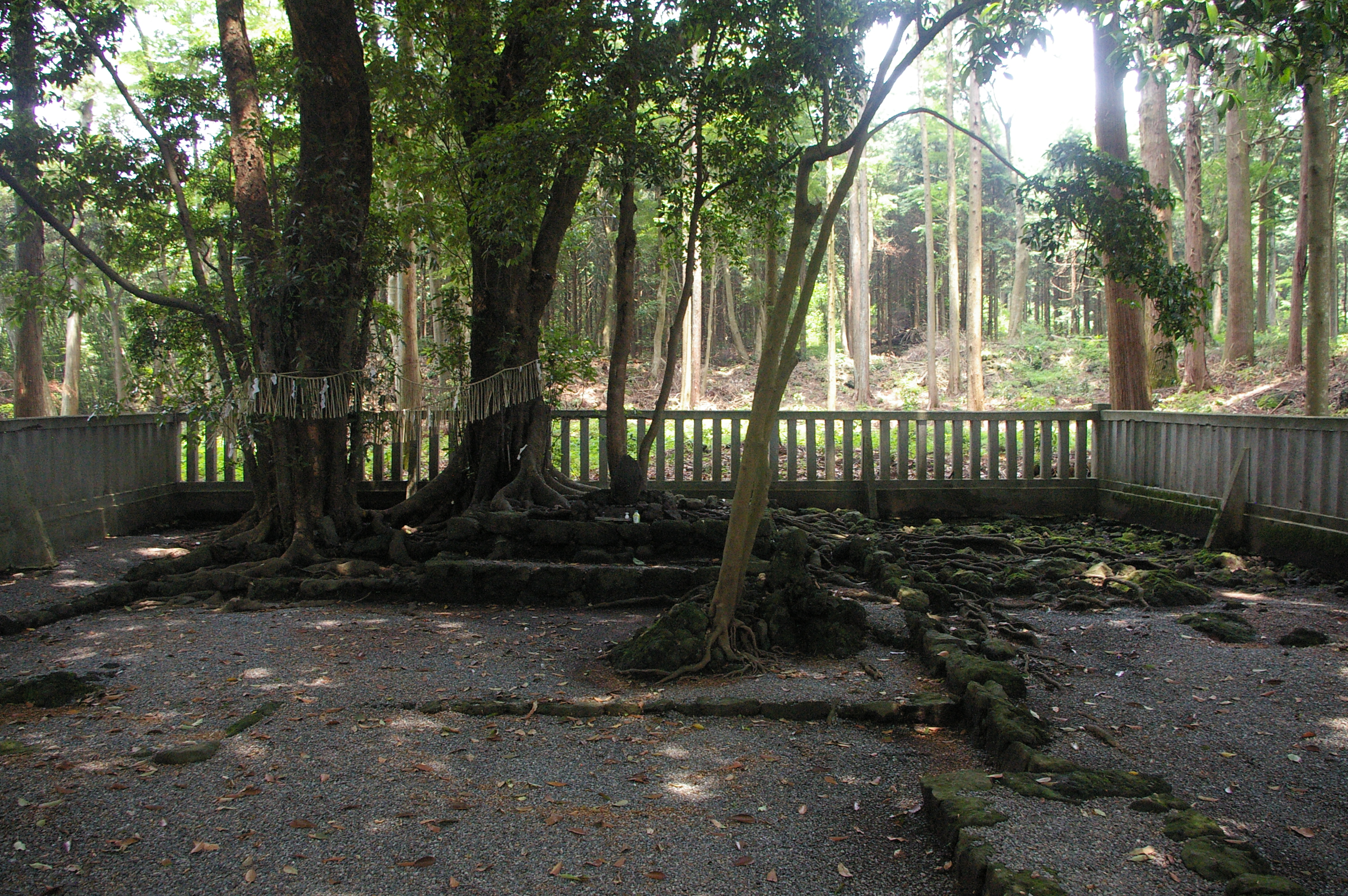

- Location within Japan Location within Shizuoka Prefecture

Religion
- Affiliation: Shinto

Location
- Location: 740 Yamamiya, Fujinomiya, Shizuoka
- Coordinates: 35°16′16″N 138°38′13″E

Architecture
- Inscriptions

UNESCO World Heritage Site
- Part of: Fujisan, sacred place and source of artistic inspiration
- Criteria: Cultural: (iii), (iv)
- Reference: 1418

Yamamiya Sengen-jinja (山宮浅間神社) is a shrine in Fujinomiya, Shizuoka, Japan. The shrine is unique as it lacks a honden and instead only has an altar. It uses a Kannabi instead

In 2013 the shrine was inscribed as part of the World Heritage Site "Fujisan, sacred place and source of artistic inspiration".

== History ==
The shrine's exact construction year is unknown however archaeological digs have found earthenware that dates back to the 12th or 15th century. Historical documents claim that the shrine was the predecessor to the Fujisan Hongū Sengen Taisha. The first "Yamamiya Goshinko" ritual was performed at the two shrines in the 16th century and the last performance of the ritual was in 1874.

In 2013 the shrine was inscribed as part of the World Heritage Site "Fujisan, sacred place and source of artistic inspiration" due to representing Mount Fuji's role as an object of worship.

== Architecture ==
The shrine has a unique layout as it lacks a honden and instead has an altar where one can pray to Mount Fuji. The shrine was built on an axis in order to provide the best views of Mount Fuji.

== Yamamiya Goshinko ==
The "Yamamiya Goshinko" was a biannual ritual performed both among the Yamamiya Sengen-jinja and the Fujisan Hongū Sengen Taisha. It is performed in April and November. During the ritual a round trip is performed between the two shrines is made the priest of the Fujisan Hongū Sengen Taisha. During this trip the priest holds a spear said to be inhabited by the spirit of Asama no Okami, the kami of Mount Fuji. The route that the priest followed was known as the "Goshinkomichi", the route was marked by stones markers erected in 1691. The final "Yamamiya Goshinko" took place during 1874 and the ritual no longer observed.
