= Yoshiwara, Shizuoka =

Yoshiwara 吉原市
- Former municipality
- Location in Japan
- Coordinates: 35.1633°N 138.6866°E
- Country: Japan
- Region: Chūbu region (Tōkai region)
- Prefecture: Shizuoka
- District: FujiDistrict,
- Merged: November 1, 1966 (now part of Fuji)

Area
  - Total: 174.56 km^{2} (67.40 sq mi)

Population (October 1, 2008)
  - Total: 90,224
  - Density: 516.86/km^{2} (1,338.7/sq mi)
- Time zone: UTC+09:00 (JST)

Yoshiwara (吉原市, Yoshiwara-shi) was a city located in eastern Shizuoka Prefecture. On November 1, 1966, Yoshiwara was merged with the city of Fuji.

During the Edo period, Yoshiwara was a post town known as Yoshiwara-juku on the Tōkaidō (road). At the time of its merger, the town had an estimated population of 90,224 and a density of 516.86 persons per km^{2}. The total area was 174.56 km^{2}. The town was served by both the Tōkaidō Main Line and the Gakunan Railway.

== History ==
- April 1, 1889 – Due to the municipal status enforcement, Yoshiwara-juku, Fuji District becomes Yoshiwara Town.
- April 1, 1940 – The village of Shimada (島田村) merged into the city of Yoshiwara
- April 3, 1941 – The village of Denbō (伝法村) merged into the city of Yoshiwara
- June 14, 1942 – Imaizumi Village (今泉村) merged into Yoshiwara.
- April 1, 1948 – The town of Yoshiwara becomes the city of Yoshiwara.
- February 11, 1955 – The city merged with the villages of Motoyoshiwara (元吉原村), Sudo (須津村), Yoshinaga (吉永村), and Harada (原田村) to form the city of Yoshiwara.
- April 1, 1955 – Ōbuchi Village (大淵村) merged into the city of Yoshiwara.
- April 1, 1956 – Funazu, Nishifunazu, and Sakai neighborhoods in the village of Hara in Suntō District merge into the city of Yoshiwara.
- November 1, 1966 – The city merged with the city of Fuji and the town of Takaoka (鷹岡町) to form the city of Fuji.

== See also ==
- List of dissolved municipalities of Japan
