= Fuji District, Shizuoka =

Former district in Shizuoka prefecture, Japan

Coordinates: 35°14′28″N 138°37′05″E

(Japan > Shizuoka Prefecture > Fuji District)

Fuji (富士郡, Fuji-gun) was a district located in Shizuoka Prefecture, Japan. The district covered the entire area of the city of Fujinomiya and parts of the city of Fuji.

Until the day before the dissolution, the district had only one town.

- town of Shibakawa(芝川町; -chō)

== Timeline ==
- April 1, 1889 - Establishment of local municipalities: Ōmiya Town (大宮町), Yoshiwara Town (吉原町) and 20 villages were formed within Fuji District. (2 towns, 20 villages)
- August 1, 1929 - Kajima Village (加島村) was elevated to town status and renamed to become Fuji Town (富士町). (3 towns, 19 villages)
- January 1, 1933 - Takaoka Village (鷹岡村) was elevated to town status to become Takaoka Town (鷹岡町). (4 towns, 18 villages)
- April 1, 1940 - Shimada Village (島田村) was merged into Yoshiwara Town.(4 towns, 17 villages)
- April 3, 1941 - Denbō Village (伝法村) was merged into Yoshiwara Town.(4 towns, 16 villages)
- June 1, 1942 - Ōmiya Town and Tomioka Village (富丘村) were merged to create Fujinomiya City(富士宮市). (3 towns, 15 villages)
- June 14, 1942 - Imaizumi Village (今泉村) was merged into Yoshiwara Town.(3 towns, 14 villages)
- April 1, 1948 - Yoshiwara Town becomes Yoshiwara City(吉原市).(2 towns, 14 villages)
- March 31, 1954 - Fuji Town absorbed Tagoura Village (田子浦村) and Iwamatsu Village (岩松村) to create Fuji City(富士市). (1 town, 12 villages)
- February 11, 1955 - Motoyoshiwara Village (元吉原村), Sudo Village (須津村), Yoshinaga Village (吉永村), and Harada Village (原田村) were merged into Yoshiwara City. (1 town, 8 villages).
- April 1, 1955(1 town, 6 villages)
  - Ōbuchi Village(大淵村) was merged into Yoshiwara City.
  - Fujine Village (富士根村) was merged into Fujinomiya City.
- September 30, 1956 - Shibatomi Village (芝富村) was merged with Utsubusa Village (内房村) and Ihara District, to create the village of Tomihara (富原村).(1 town, 6 villages)
- March 31, 1957 - Yuno Village (柚野村) and Tomihara Village were merged to create the town of Shibakawa (芝川町).(2 towns, 4 villages)
- April 1, 1958 - Kitayama Village (北山村), Kamiide Village (上井出村), Shiraito Village (白糸村), and Ueno Village (上野村) were merged into Fujinomiya City. (2 towns)
- November 1, 1966 - Takaoka Town was merged with the cities of Fuji and Yoshiwara to create the new city of Fuji. (1 town)
- March 23, 2010 - The town of Shibakawa was merged into the expanded city of Fujinomiya. Fuji District was dissolved as a result of this merger.

== Related Article ==
- List of dissolved districts of Japan

List of provinces of Japan > Tōkaidō > Suruga Province > Fuji District

Fuji (富士郡, Fuji-no-kōri) was a district located in Suruga Province.
