= Fujisan Hongū Sengen Taisha =

Shinto shrine in Shizuoka Prefecture, Japan

Fujisan Hongū Sengen Taisha 富士山本宮浅間大社
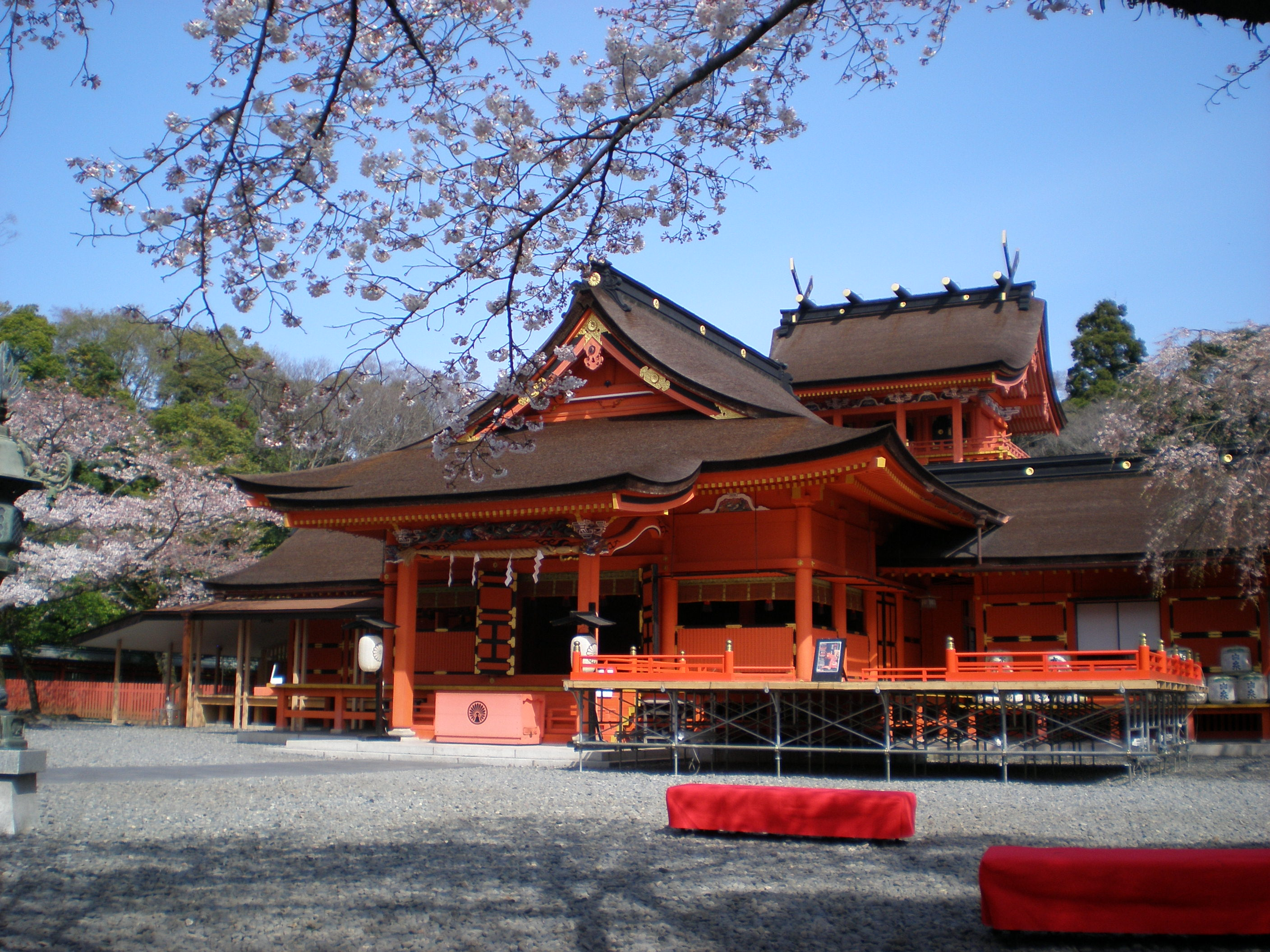
- Honden of Fujisan Hongū Sengen Taisha

- Location within Shizuoka Prefecture Location within Japan

Religion
- Affiliation: Shinto
- Deity: Konohanasakuya-hime
- Festival: May 5
- Type: Asama Shrine

Location
- Location: 1-1 Miya-chō, Fujinomiya, Shizuoka, 418-0067
- Interactive map of Fujisan Hongū Sengen Taisha 富士山本宮浅間大社
- Coordinates: 35°13′39″N 138°36′37″E

Architecture
- Style: Sengen-zukuri
- Established: 806
- UNESCO World Heritage Site
- Type: Cultural
- Criteria: iii, vi
- Designated: 2013
- Reference no.: 1418

Website
- Official website

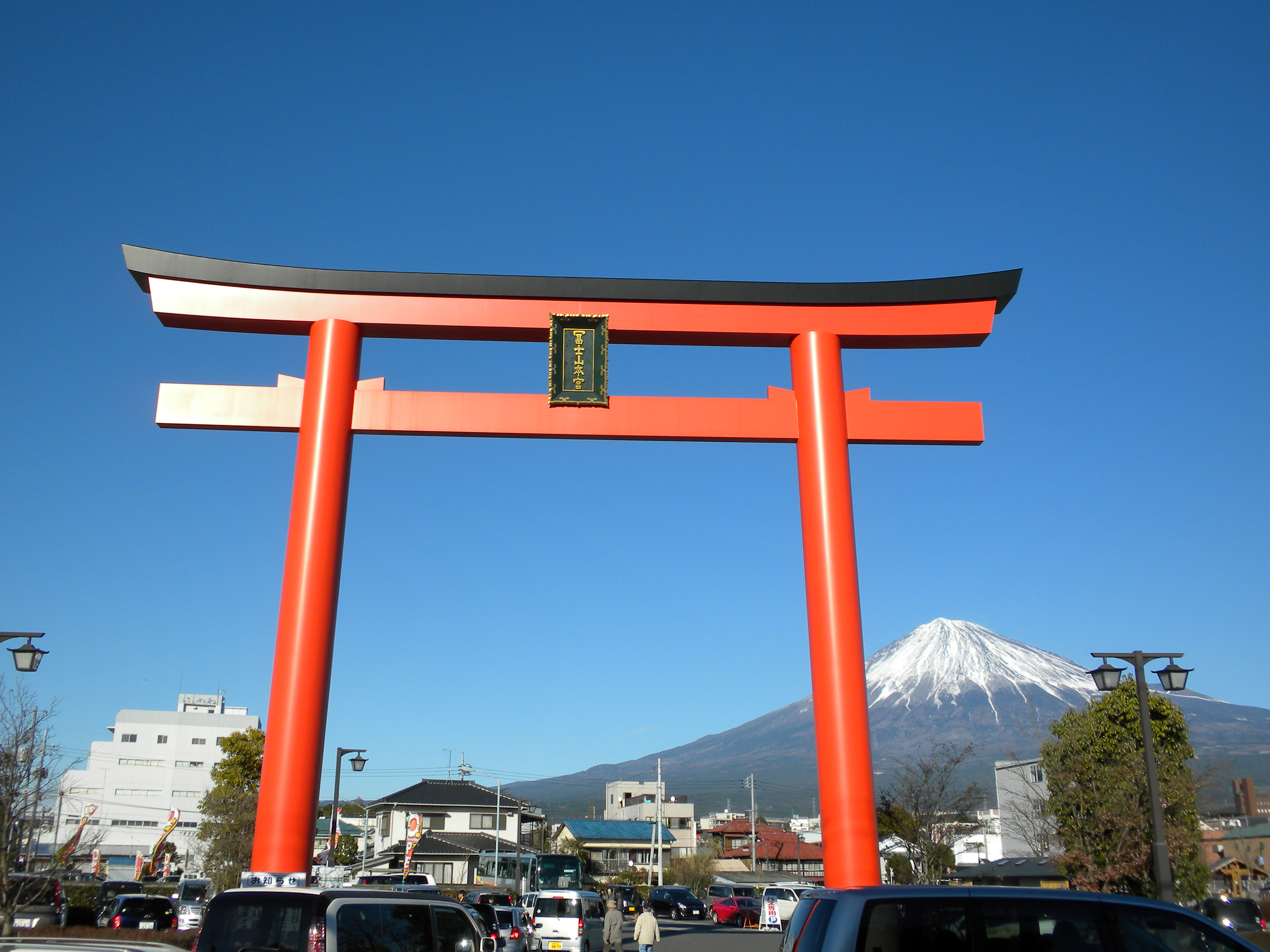
Torii

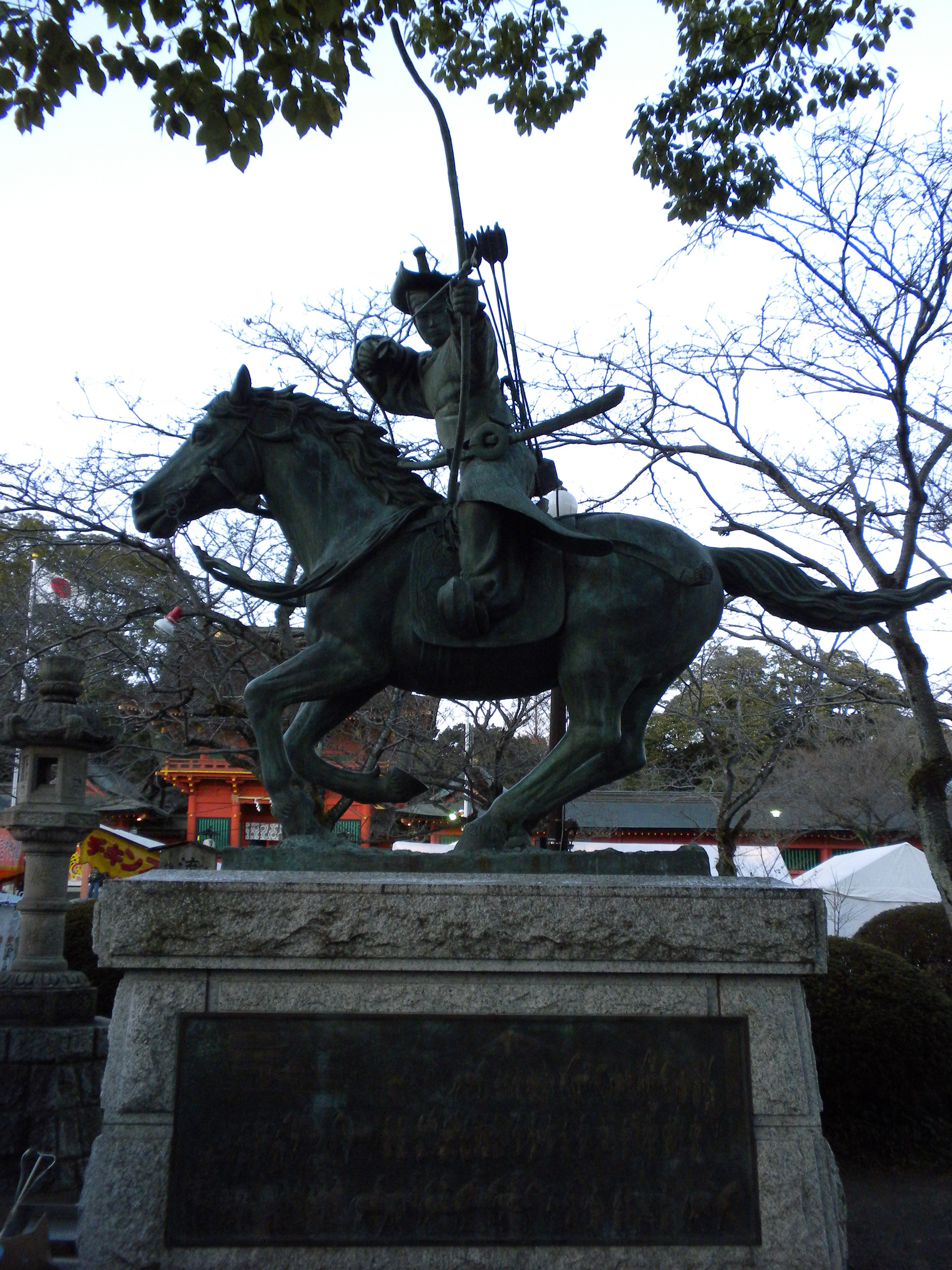
Yabusame

The Fujisan Hongū Sengen Taisha (富士山本宮浅間大社) is a Shintō shrine in the city of Fujinomiya in Shizuoka Prefecture, Japan. It is the ichinomiya of former Suruga Province, and is the head shrine of the approximately 1300 Asama or Sengen shrines in the country. The shrine has an extensive location within downtown Fujinomiya; in addition, the entire top of Mount Fuji from the 8th stage upwards is considered to be part of the shrine grounds.

The main festival of the shrine is held annually on May 5, and features yabusame performances.

In 2013, the shrine was added to the World Heritage List as part of the Fujisan Cultural Site.

It is similar to Chōkaisan Ōmonoimi Shrine at Mount Chōkai.

== Enshrined kami ==
- Konohanasakuya-hime (木花咲耶姫), the daughter of Ōyamatsu-no-mikoto (大山祇命). Mount Fuji was deified and its kami was named Asama no Okami (浅間大神), also known as Asama Daimyōjin (浅間大明神), Asama Gongen (浅間権現) or Sengen Daibōsatsu (浅間大菩薩), and is associated with Konohanasakuya-hime.

=== Secondary kami ===
- Ninigi-no-mikoto (瓊々杵尊), husband of Konohanasakuya-hime
- Ōyamatsumi-no-mikoto (大山祇神), father of Konohanasakuya-hime

== History ==
The foundation of the Fujisan Hongū Sengen Taisha predates the historical period. Per shrine tradition, it was established in the reign of Emperor Suinin, with the shrine first built on its current location during the reign of Emperor Keikō. This was a period of intense volcanic activity on Mount Fuji, and the shrine was built in order to appease the kami of the mountain. The shrine is mentioned in accounts of the legendary hero Yamato Takeru, who prayed to the kami of Mount Fuji to help him escape from danger while in Suruga. During the reign of Emperor Heizei, Sakanoue no Tamuramaro was ordered to rebuild the shrine in its current location.

Historical records, however, only exist as far as the early ninth century. The Shoku Nihongi records that Mount Fuji erupted in 781, and the Nihon Montoku Tennō Jitsuroku indicates that the Asama Jinja had become a third-rank shine by 853. As the kami of the shrine is the goddess of fire, it is logical that a shrine was erected to pray for the end of the eruption between 781 and around 806. The Heian period Engishiki records list the shrine as a myōjin taisha (名神大社) and the ichinomiya of Suruga Province; however, the Shizuoka Sengen Shrine in the city of Shizuoka is located much closer to the provincial capital. For this reason, the shrine in Fujinomiya is styled as the "Hongū" and the shrine in Shizuoka is styled as the Shingū. The entire mountain was off-limits for religious reasons, except for Shugendō monks noted for their asceticism. Pilgrimages to Mount Fuji became common in the ninth century onwards, although women were forbidden from climbing.

During the Kamakura period, the Shōgun Minamoto no Yoritomo was a frequent visitor to the shrine during his hunting expeditions/war games at the base of Mount Fuji, beginning the tradition of yabusame during the shrine's festivals and association with the samurai class. Through the Muromachi period, the Ashikaga clan, Odawara Hōjō, the Imagawa clan, the Takeda clan and the Tokugawa clan were patrons of the shrine. Tokugawa Ieyasu made a large donation after his victory at the Battle of Sekigahara, and subsequent generations of the Tokugawa shogunate kept the shrine in good repair. During the Edo period, the shrine was the center of a cult worshipping Mount Fuji, and drew pilgrims from all over Japan. The Hongū Sengen Taisha was the place at which pilgrims would purify themselves in water before beginning the ascent.

From 1871, under the State Shinto's Modern system of ranked Shinto shrines, the Fuji Hongū Sengen Taisha was officially designated an Imperial shrine, 2nd rank (官幣中社, Kanpei-chusha). It was promoted to an Imperial shrine, 1st rank (官幣大社, Kanpei-taisha) in 1896, meaning that it stood in the first rank of government-supported shrines.

Today, some 400,000 pilgrims climb Mount Fuji every year, and many of them stop at the shrine in order to wish for a safe climb. The shrine celebrated the 1200th anniversary of its foundation in 2006. In 2013, it was included in the World Heritage Site designation for Mount Fuji

The shrine is located about ten-minutes on foot from Fujinomiya Station on the JR Central Minobu Line.

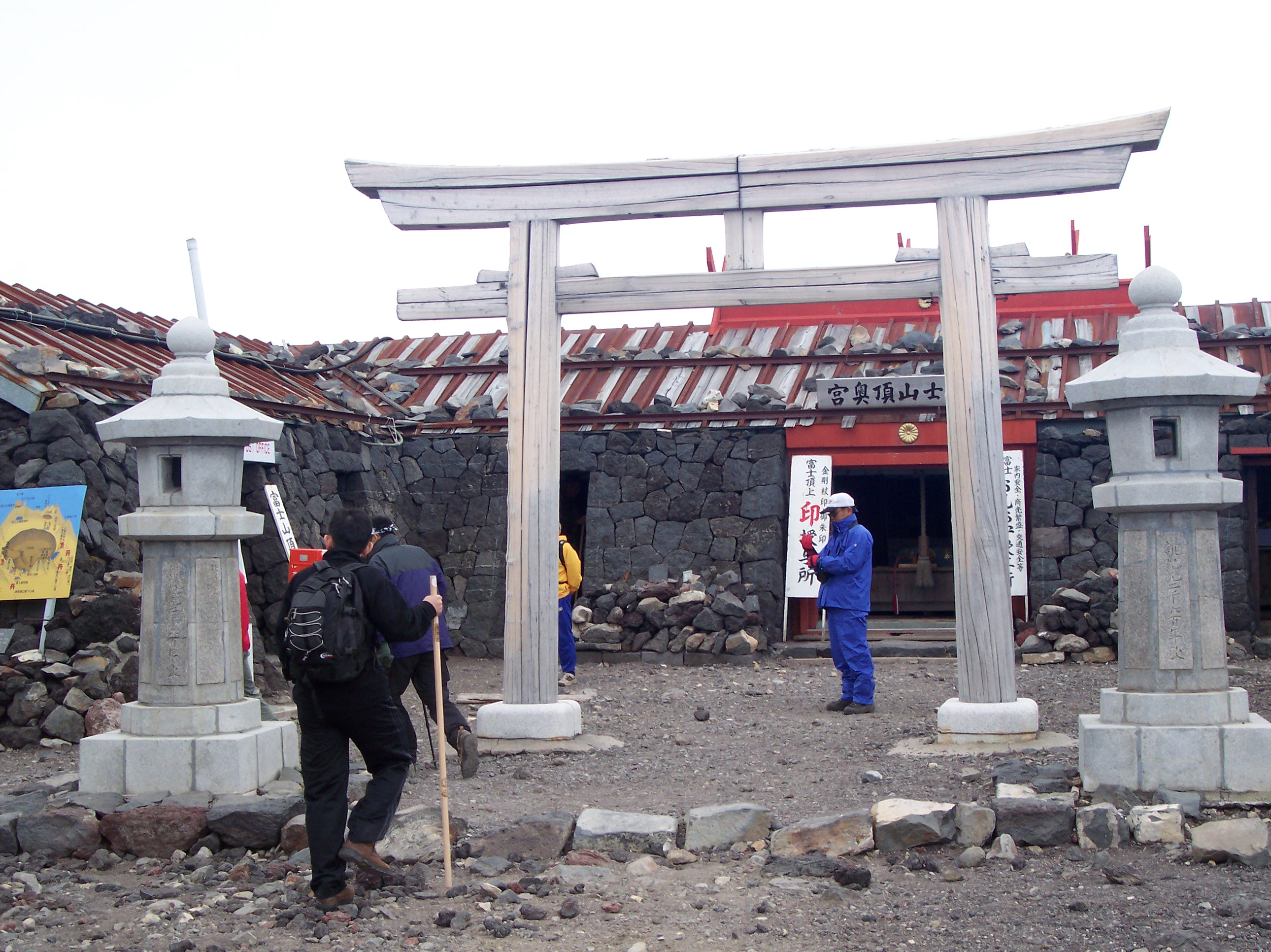
Fujisan Hongū Sengen Taisha Oku-no-miya at summit of Mount Fuji (富士山頂上奥宮)

== Cultural properties ==
=== National Important Cultural Properties ===
- Honden (本殿) Edo period (1604); The Honden of the shrine is in the distinctive sengen-zukuri style with a two-story gate tower. It was built in 1604 per a donation by Tokugawa Ieyasu, but has been repaired several times, most notably after the Ansei Tōkai earthquake of 1854.
- Colored silk painting of Fuji Mandala (絹本著色富士曼荼羅図) Muromachi period; The scroll measures 180.2 x 117.8 cm and depicts an idealized view of Mount Fuji in gold, with three summits, each of which contains the image of divinity. A long line of white robed pilgrims is snaking up the slopes of the mountain, and the sun and moon are depicted to either side of the peak. This scroll was designated a National Important Cultural Property in 1977
- Tachi sword (太刀 銘南无薬師瑠璃光如来) Kamakura period; This sword is claimed to have been a donation from Takeda Shingen. The hilt of the sword is inscribed with the name "Kanemitsu", who was a noted wordsmith from Bizen active from 1306-1334. This sword was designated a National Important Cultural Property in 1912
- Wakizashi dagger (脇指 銘奉富士本宮源式部丞信国) Muromachi period; This dagger is inscribed with the date of 1427 on its hilt and the name of "Nobukuni". It was a donation to the shrine by Anayama Nobutomo, the son-in-law of Takeda Nobutora in 1547. It has been registered as a National Important Cultural Property since 1912.

=== Natural monument ===
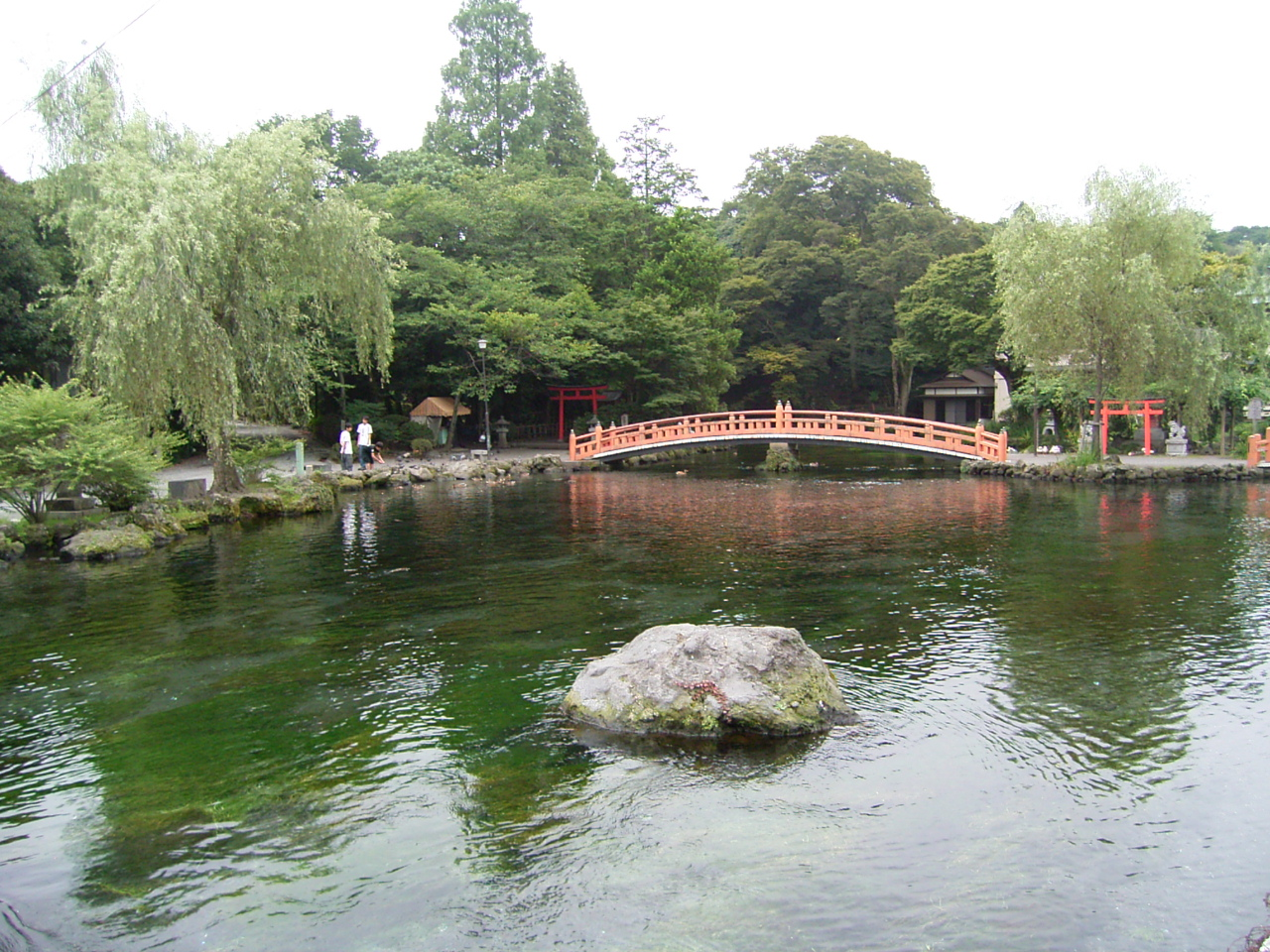
Wakutama Springs (湧玉池)

- Wakutama-ike (湧玉池) is a large pond in the shrine grounds which contains a spring which is the headwaters of the Kanda river, a minor tributary of the Fuji River. It has been protected as a National Natural Monument since 1944.

=== Shizuoka Prefecture Designated Tangible Cultural Properties ===
- Shaden (社殿) Edo period (1611); The main hall is multi-story, with a Sangensha Nagare-zukuri style main hall atop a lower level measuring five bays across and four bays. Due to its unique and distinctive shrine building style, it is known as "Asama-zukuri." This is the only remaining structure in this style. A worship hall with a gabled roof and a gabled roof is located in front of the main hall, and the building between it and the main hall serves as the offering hall. The worship hall was built at the same time as the main hall, but the veranda is thought to have been added later. The tower gate is a three-bay, gabled structure with a cypress bark roof .
- Fujisan Hongu Sengen Taisha Heiden, Haiden, Rōmon and Lattice fence (富士山本宮浅間大社 弊殿、拝殿、樓門、透塀二棟) Edo period (1604); Rōmon is completed in 1614
- Large celadon vase with lotus petal design (青磁浮牡丹文香炉) South Song Dynasty; Height 25.5 cm, diameter of rim 34.0 cm, diameter of base 18.7 cm, diameter of belly 34.0 cm, Longquan Kiln. This is a large jar with a broad shoulder, and the entire body is covered in a series of thin lotus petals in relief, from the shoulder of the rim to the base of the base. The body is grayish-white and is thickly coated on both the inside and outside with the emerald-green glaze characteristic of celadon, but the rim and base are unglazed and have a light brown surface.
- Celadon incense burner with floating peony design (青磁蓮弁文大壺) South Song Dynasty; Height 14.5 cm, diameter of opening 34.0 cm, diameter of body 16.6 cm, diameter of base 7.6 cm, Longquan kiln, Southern Song period. This large, three-legged incense burner, known as a hakama-koshi incense burner, is decorated with elegant floating peonies around the body and has a deep powder-blue glaze.
- Large celadon tea bowl made by hand (人形手青磁大茶碗) Ming Dynasty; Height 9.5 cm, diameter 17.8 cm, base diameter 6.0 cm, Ming Dynasty. This large bowl has a thick rim and a clay-like base. The glaze is a loquat color, and the interior is lined with a thunderbolt band and a stamped pattern around the base. While this bowl does not have the Chinese character for "Tangji" (Chinese dynasty), the interior does have the stamped pattern, and the shape, glaze color, and other characteristics of a "doll-shaped" bowl are striking. The accompanying Tenmoku stand with carved rings is also a product of the Ming Dynasty.
- Red threaded armor (鉄板札紅糸威五枚胴具足) late Muromachi period; Body height 31.0 cm, Kusazuri height 30.0 cm, Body circumference 88.5 cm, Plate height 30.0 cm, Late Muromachi period; This piece belongs to the highest class of armor, and its eleven-ken Kusazuri is rare. It also features striking characteristics of the late Muromachi period, such as a pear-colored ground lacquer around the metal fittings and the eight-pair rivets with red copper four-eye diamond rivets. The four-eye diamond crest is the family crest of the main branch of the Takeda clan, and it is believed to have been donated by Takeda Katsuyori.

== See also ==
- List of Shinto shrines
- Ichinomiya
- Fujiyoshida, Yamanashi
- Chōkaisan Ōmonoimi Shrine
