= Sengen shrine =

Type of Shinto shrine

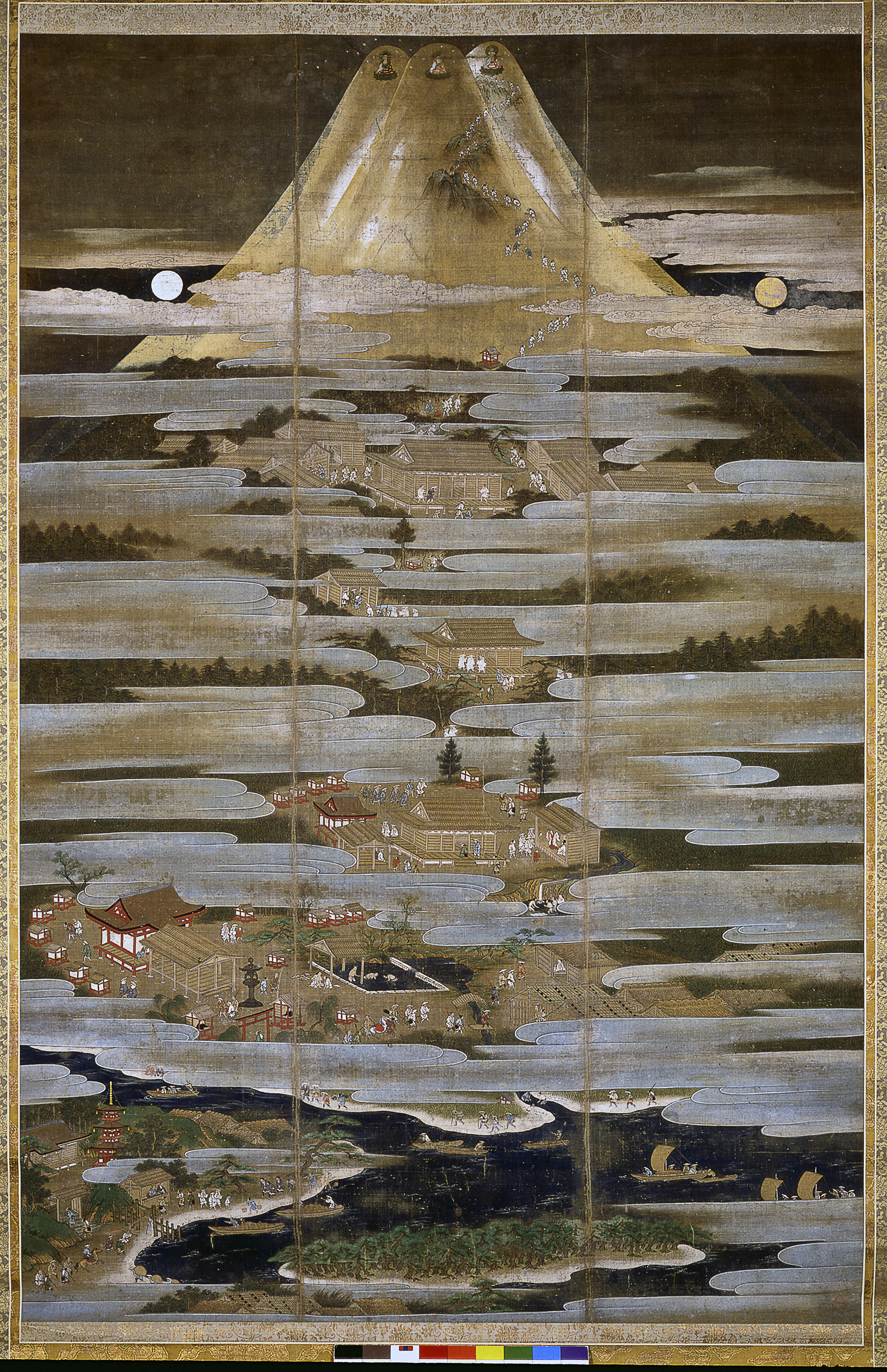
Fuji Mandara from Fujisan Hongu Sengen Jinja

An Asama shrine (浅間神社, Asama jinja, Sengen jinja) is a type of Shinto Shrine in Japan centered on the worship of the kami of volcanos in general, and Mount Fuji in particular.

Per the Jinja Honchō, there are approximately 1300 Asama shrines in the country, centered primarily in Shizuoka Prefecture and Yamanashi Prefecture, and to a lesser extent in the prefectures of the Kantō region and Aichi. Almost all Asama Shrines are within sight of Mount Fuji. Where this is not possible because of distance or obstructions, a miniature replica of Mount Fuji known as a Fujizuka (富士塚) made from rocks from the mountain was often erected within the shrine grounds. The head of all Asama shrines is the Fujisan Hongū Sengen Taisha, located in Fujinomiya, Shizuoka.

In 2013 the Fujisan Hongū Sengen Taisha, Yamamiya Sengen Shrine, Murayama Sengen Shrine, Suyama Sengen Shrine, Fuji Sengen Shrine, Kawaguchi Asama Shrine, and Fuji Omuro Sengen Shrine were added to the World Heritage List as part of the Fujisan Cultural Site.

== Shinto belief ==
The primary kami at Asama shrines is Konohanasakuya-hime, sometimes in combination with her father, Ōyamatsumi-no-Mikoto and/or sister Iwanaga-hime. Konohanasakuya-hime appears in both the Kojiki and Nihonshoki and appears to have originally associated with protection against fire, per the stories which appear in both chronicles. However, there is no specific reference which explains how she came to be associated with Mount Fuji at some point in the Muromachi or Edo period.

== History ==
The derivation of the word "Asama" is subject to considerable uncertainty and debate, but the original meaning of the word appears to be connected with volcanoes or volcanic eruptions, and the presence of water springs in the foothills of such mountains. Mountain-worship based cults centered on Mount Asama (浅間山, Asama-san) in Gunma and Mount Asama (朝熊山, Asama-yama) in Mie appear contemporary with the mountain-cult centered on Mount Fuji, via references in the Man'yōshū. However, worship of Mount Fuji, as the tallest and most famous volcano in Japan came to dominate. Mount Fuji has erupted eighteen times in recorded history. In order to pacify it, the Imperial Court awarded it court rank and venerated it as Sengen Ōkami in the early Heian period

According to shrine tradition from the Fujisan Hongū Sengen Taisha, Sakanoue no Tamuramaro moved an existing shrine from the slopes of Mount Fuji to the lowlands during the reign of Emperor Suinin. Traditions also exist associating Mount Fuji with immortality-seeking wizards, and attribute the legendary mystical powers of En no Gyōja to his training on the mountain.

From the Heian period, the worship of the volcano kami as providers of water combined with Shingon esoteric Buddhism and with Shugendō practices. Yamabushi Matsudai Shōnin is said to have climbed Mount Fuji several hundred times and built a temple, with the retired Emperor Toba as his patron.

By the Muromachi period, pilgrimages to climb Mount Fuji increased in popularity, and mandala were produced both as souvenirs, and to spread the cult. Such mandala typically depicted pilgrims landing at Miho no Matsubara, and the various stages of the ascent of Mount Fuji. The top of the mountain is depicted as having three peaks, about which float various Buddhas and Bosatsu. In the Edo period, the Fuji-kō, a religious confraternity system became extremely popular in the Kantō region, using magico-religious practices with talismans to protect followers from illness and catastrophe, despite efforts by the authorities to discourage it.

After the Meiji Restoration, the cult of Mount Fuji declined precipitously, and the Fuji-ko groups are now subsumed into various of the sect Shintō organizations.

== Related shrines ==
- Ichinomiya Asama Shrine (一宮浅間神社) in Fuefuki, Yamanashi Prefecture
- Omuro Sengen Shrine (小室浅間神社) in Fujiyoshida, Yamanashi Prefecture
- Kitaguchi Hongū Fuji Sengen Shrine (北口本宮冨士浅間神社) in Fujiyoshida, Yamanashi Prefecture
- Fujiomuro Sengen Shrine (冨士御室浅間神社) in Fujikawaguchiko, Yamanashi Prefecture
- Shizuoka Sengen Shrine (静岡淺間神社) in Aoi-ku, Shizuoka, Shizuoka Prefecture
- Fujirokusho Sengen Shrine (富知六所淺間神社) in Fuji, Shizuoka Prefecture
- Asamasha (浅間社) in Nara, a Side Shrine of Naramichi Ten Jinja (奈良町天神社), Nara Prefecture
- Geino Asama Shrine (芸能浅間神社) in Shinjuku, Tokyo
- Naruko Fuji Asama Shrine (成子富士浅間神社) in Shinjuku, Tokyo
- Fuji Asama Ookami (富士浅間大神) in Bunkyō, Tokyo
- Asama Jinja (浅間神社) in Susono, Shizuoka Prefecture (35°13′14.1″N 138°53′10.5″E)
- Sengen Jinja (浅間神社) in Numazu, Shizuoka Prefecture (35°07′26.2″N 138°52′22.4″E)

== See also ==
- List of Shinto shrines
- List of Jingū
- Asama Maru
- Fujiko
