= Inako Station (Shizuoka) =

Railway station in Fujinomiya, Shizuoka Prefecture, Japan

Inako Station 稲子駅
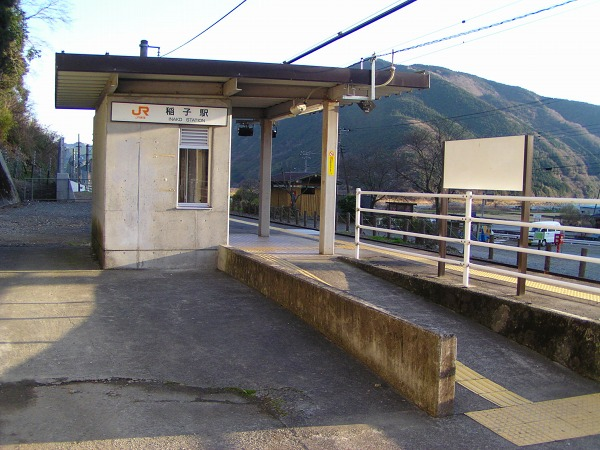
- JR Inako Station in March 2006

General information
- Location: Shibakawa-chō Shimoinako, Fujinomiya-shi, Shizuoka-ken; Japan
- Coordinates: 35°13′51″N 138°32′13″E
- Operator: JR Central
- Line: Minobu Line
- Distance: 24.0 kilometers from Fuji
- Platforms: 1 side platform

Other information
- Status: Unstaffed

History
- Opened: August 15, 1929

Passengers
- FY2017: 8 daily
Location
- Location within Shizuoka Prefecture Location within Japan

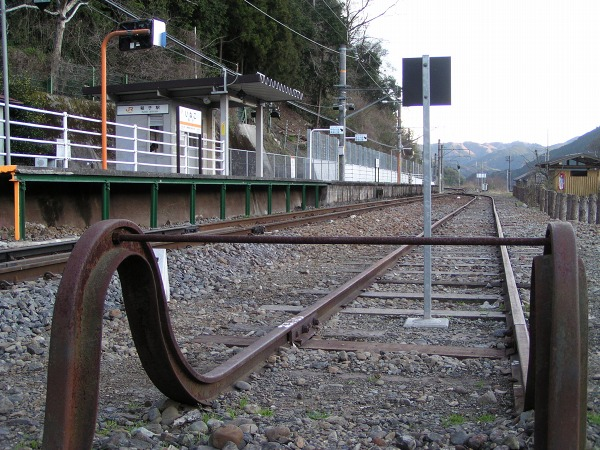
headshunt track at Inako Station

Inako Station (稲子駅, Inako-eki) is a railway station on the Minobu Line of Central Japan Railway Company (JR Central) located in the city of Fujinomiya, Shizuoka Prefecture, Japan.

== Lines ==
Inako Station is served by the Minobu Line and is located 24.0 kilometers from the southern terminus of the line at Fuji Station.

== Layout ==
Inako Station has one side platform serving a single bi-directional track. The track is located on a headshunt to permit passage of express trains. The station is unattended and has automated ticket machines and an automated turnstile.

== Adjacent stations ==
«	Service	»
Minobu Line
Limited Express Fujikawa: Does not stop at this station
Shibakawa	Local	Tōshima

== History ==
Inako Station was opened on August 15, 1929, as part of the original Minobu Line for both passenger and freight services. It came under control of the Japanese Government Railways (JGR) on May 1, 1941. The JGR became the Japan National Railways (JNR) after World War II. Along with the division and privatization of JNR on April 1, 1987, the station came under the control and operation of the Central Japan Railway Company.

== Passenger statistics ==
In fiscal 2017, the station was used by an average of 8 passengers daily (boarding passengers only).

== Surrounding area ==
- Fuji River

== See also ==
- List of railway stations in Japan
