= Fujinomiya, Shizuoka =

Fujinomiya 富士宮市
- City
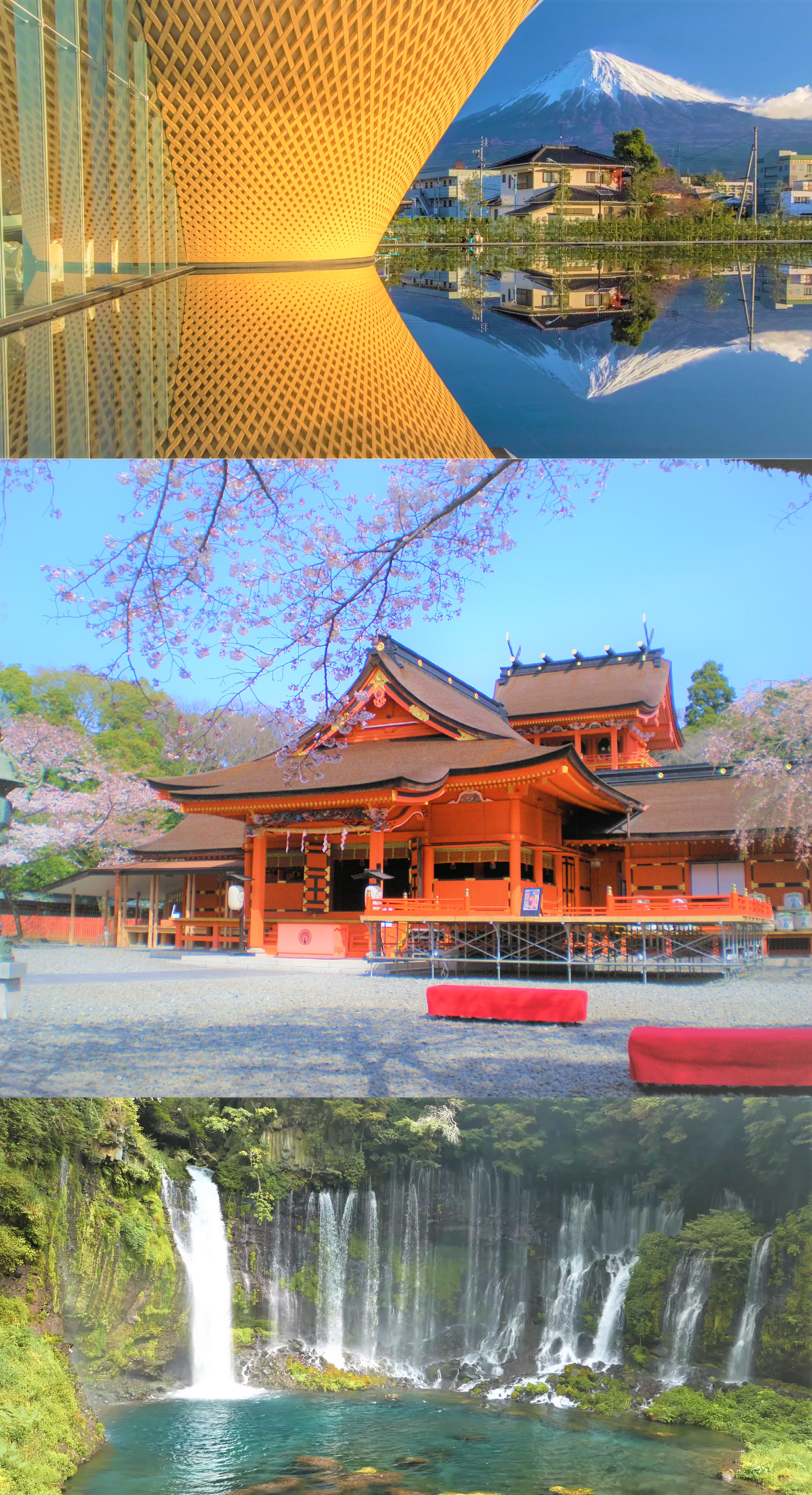
- Mount Fuji, Fujisan Hongū Sengen Taisha, Shiraito Falls

- Flag Emblem

- Location of Fujinomiya in Shizuoka Prefecture

- Coordinates: 35°13′19.6″N 138°37′17.8″E
- Country: Japan
- Region: Chūbu (Tōkai)
- Prefecture: Shizuoka
- City settled: June 1, 1942

Government
  - Mayor: Hidetada Sudo

Area
  - Total: 389.08 km^{2} (150.22 sq mi)

Population (September 2017)
  - Total: 132,507
  - Density: 340.56/km^{2} (882.06/sq mi)
- Time zone: UTC+9 (Japan Standard Time)
- Tree: Maple
- Flower: Fujizakura
- Bird: Eurasian skylark
- Fish: Rainbow trout
- Phone number: 0544-22-1119
- Address: 150 Yumizawachō, Fujinomiya-shi, Shizuoka-ken 418-8601
- Website: Official website

Fujinomiya (富士宮市, Fujinomiya-shi) is a city located in central Shizuoka Prefecture, Japan. As of 1 July 2019, the city had an estimated population of 132,507 in 56,655 households, and a population density of 340 persons per km^{2}. The total area of the city is 388.99 square kilometres (150.19 sq mi).

== History ==
The city name comes from the former shrine name of Fujisan Hongū Sengen Taisha, "Fujinomiya". It is an ancient settlement that developed as a prosperous toriimae-machi (town in front of torii) of Fujisan Hongū Sengen Taisha, where the Fuji clan served as the high priest of the shrine. Nearby is the sanctuary of Taiseki-ji temple, founded in 1290 by Nikkō Shōnin as the headquarters of Nichiren Shōshū Buddhism.

Fujinomiya is closely related to Mount Fuji, and was located in the crossroad of Ōmiya and Murayamaguchi mountain pilgrimage trails. During the Kamakura period, the hunting event Fuji no Makigari arranged by shogun Minamoto no Yoritomo was held in the ancient region of Fujino, where the Revenge of the Soga Brothers incident also took place. These events were disseminated as historical materials such as Ōrai Mono (historical primary education textbooks created mainly in the form of letters), and as the subject of entertainment such as kabuki, noh, and jōruri.

Fujinomiya was a post town (fortified during the Sengoku period) on the primary route connecting Suruga with Kai Province. During the Edo period, the area was tenryō territory under direct control of the Tokugawa shogunate. British consul Sir Rutherford Alcock made the first recorded ascent on Mount Fuji by a non-Japanese person from Fujinomiya in 1860. During the cadastral reform of the early Meiji period in 1889, the area was reorganized into Omiya Town and eight villages with Fuji District, Shizuoka.

On 1 June 1942, the modern city was established with the merger of Omiya town with neighboring Fujioka village. The city expanded by annexing neighboring Fujine village in 1955, and Kitayama, Shiraito, Kamiide and Ueno villages in 1956.

The most recent merger was on 23 March 2010, when the town of Shibakawa (from Fuji District) was merged into Fujinomiya.

== Geography ==
Fujinomiya is located in central Shizuoka Prefecture on an upland plateau on the foothills and lower slopes of Mount Fuji, with an altitude ranging from 35 to 3,336 m (115 to 10,945 ft). The average temperature is 15.6 °C (60.1 °F). Much of the city lies within the borders of Fuji-Hakone-Izu National Park. Fujinomiya is known as one of the main starting points for climbing trips to Mount Fuji, the summit of which is partly within the borders of the city. As with most of Shizuoka Prefecture, the area enjoys a warm maritime climate with hot, humid summers and mild, cool winters.

=== Surrounding municipalities ===
- Shizuoka Prefecture
  - Fuji
  - Gotemba
  - Shimizu-ku, Shizuoka
  - Oyama
- Yamanashi Prefecture
  - Fujikawaguchiko
  - Fujiyoshida
  - Minobu
  - Nanbu
  - Narusawa

=== Climate ===
The city has a climate characterized by hot and humid summers, and relatively mild winters (Köppen climate classification Cfa). The average annual temperature in Fujinomiya is 14.9 °C. The average annual rainfall is 1881 mm with September as the wettest month. The temperatures are highest on average in August, at around 26.1 °C, and lowest in January, at around 4.4 °C.

== Demographics ==
Per Japanese census data, the population of Fujinomiya has recently plateaued after a long period of growth.

Historical population
Year	Pop.	±%
1940	65,378	—
1950	86,447	+32.2%
1960	88,719	+2.6%
1970	99,021	+11.6%
1980	118,214	+19.4%
1990	127,127	+7.5%
2000	130,372	+2.6%
2010	132,001	+1.2%
2020	128,105	−3.0%

== Government ==
Fujinomiya has a mayor-council form of government with a directly elected mayor and a unicameral city legislature of 22 members.

== Economy ==
Fujinomiya is an industrial center within Shizuoka Prefecture, traditionally with a heavy emphasis on the paper industry. Other manufacturing industries include rotating equipment, automotive parts, chemicals and pharmaceuticals.

== Education ==
Fujinomiya has 21 public elementary schools and 13 public junior high schools operated by the city government. The city has four public high schools operated by the Shizuoka Prefectural Board of Education. The city also has one private junior school, and two private high schools. The prefectural Shizuoka Prefectural Agriculture and Forestry College is also located in Fujinomiya.

== Transportation ==
=== Railway ===
- Central Japan Railway Company - Minobu Line
  - Gendōji - Fujinomiya - Nishi-Fujinomiya - Numakubo - Shibakawa - Inako

=== Highway ===
- Nishi-Fuji Road (connects to Tōmei Expressway)
- National Route 52
- National Route 139
- National Route 469

=== Bus ===
- Fuji Kyūkō
- Fuji-Kyū Shizuoka Bus
- Sankō town coach
- Fujinomiya Station - Tokyo International Airport Express Bus
- Fujinomiya Station - Tokyo Station Express Bus
- Kyoto/Osaka line Express Bus

== Sister cities ==
- Santa Monica, California, United States, since July 21, 1975
- Shaoxing, Zhejiang Province, China, since November 11, 1997

== Local attractions ==
- Fujinomiya is famous for yakisoba noodles (富士宮やきそば, Fujinomiya yakisoba)
- Mount Fuji
- Taisekiji Temple
- Fujisan Hongū Sengen Taisha
- Shiraito Falls
- Asagiri Plateau
- Lake Tanuki
- Sengo ruins
- Ōshikakubo ruins
- Yamamiya Sengen-jinja

=== Festivals ===
- Hatsumōde (Fujisan Hongū Sengen Taisha)
- Yabusame (Horseback archery) Festival (May 4, 5, 6)
- Oyamabiraki (opening of climbing season) July 1
- Gojinka-festival (August)
- Fujinomiya Autumn Festival (November 3, 4, 5)

=== Events ===
- The 13th World Scout Jamboree was held August 2–10, 1971 on Asagiri Heights on the western side of Mount Fuji.
- The 9th ISF Women's World Championship was held in Fujinomiya, in 1998.

== Noted people from Fujinomiya ==
- Kumiko Akiyoshi - actress
- Mizuki Sano - singer
- Kōtarō Satomi - actor
- Kaori Shimizu - singer
- Takahiro Yamada (Asian Kung-Fu Generation)
- Masaaki Sawanobori - professional soccer player
- Shinsuke Tayama - Olympic athlete
- Toshie Uematsu - professional wrestler
- Yasuhiro Hiraoka - professional soccer player
- Yutaka Yoshida - professional soccer player
- Hirotsugu Akaike - statistician

== Gallery ==
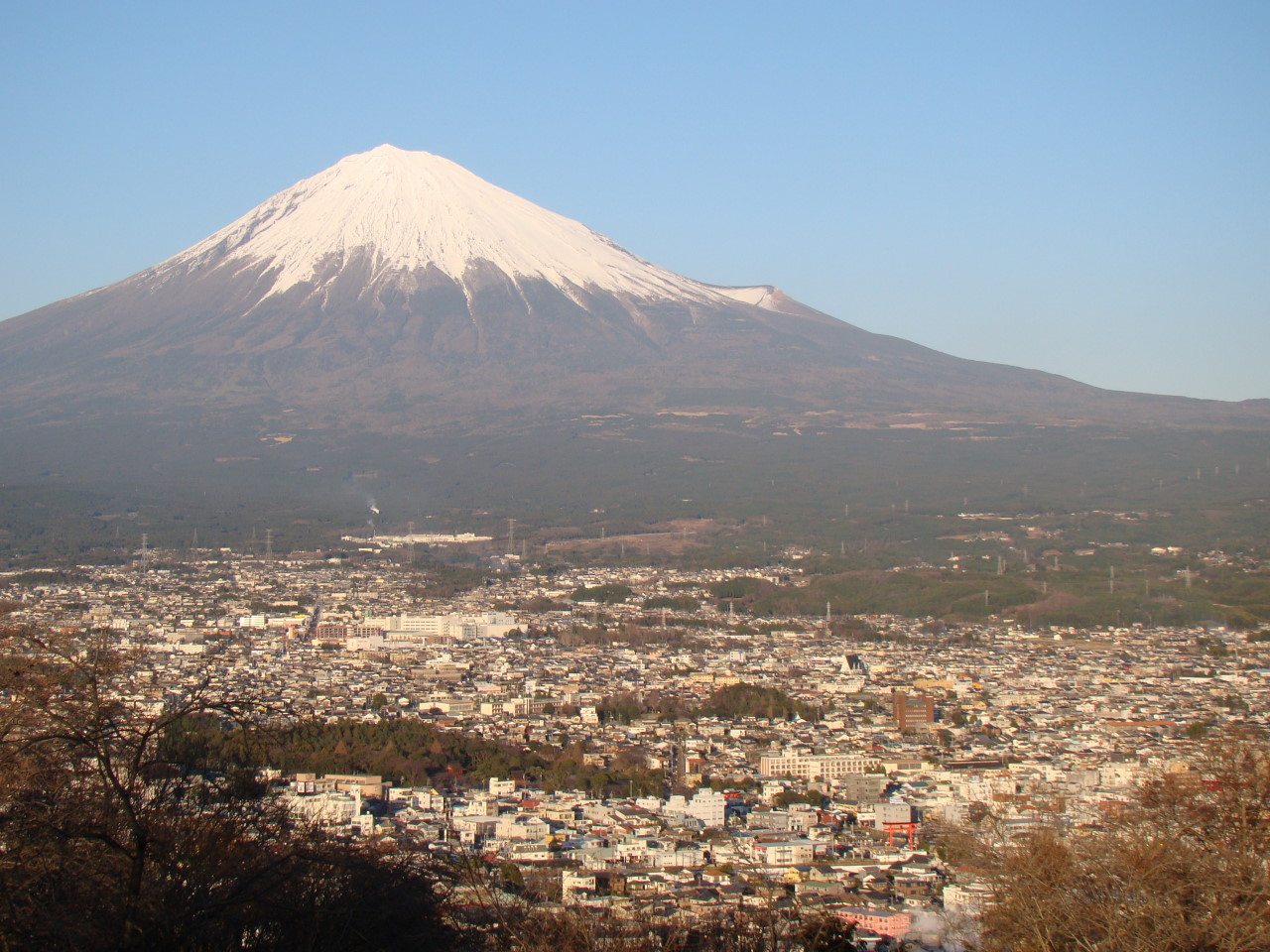
Fujinomiya City

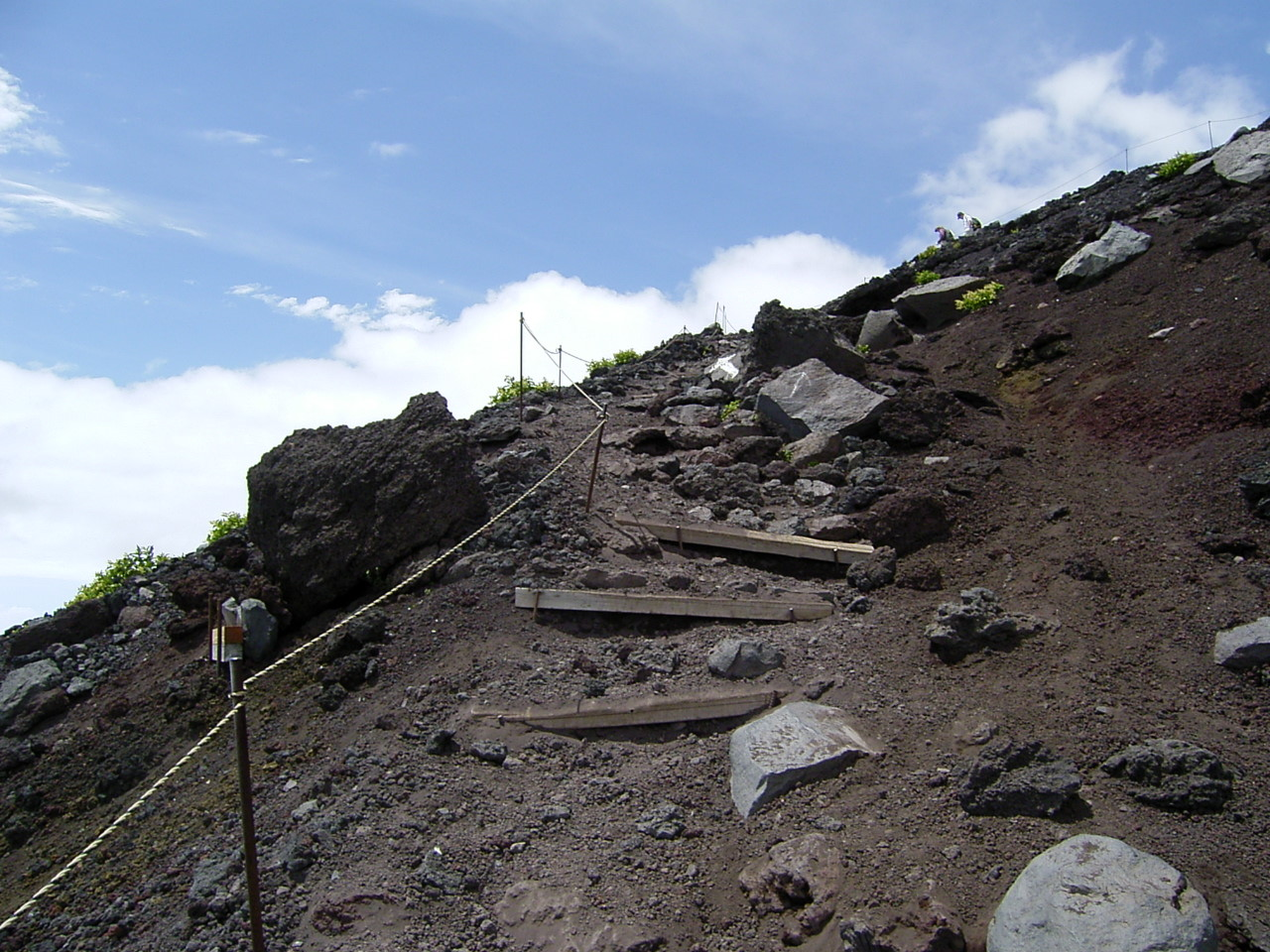
Climbing Mount Fuji-Fujinomiya routes

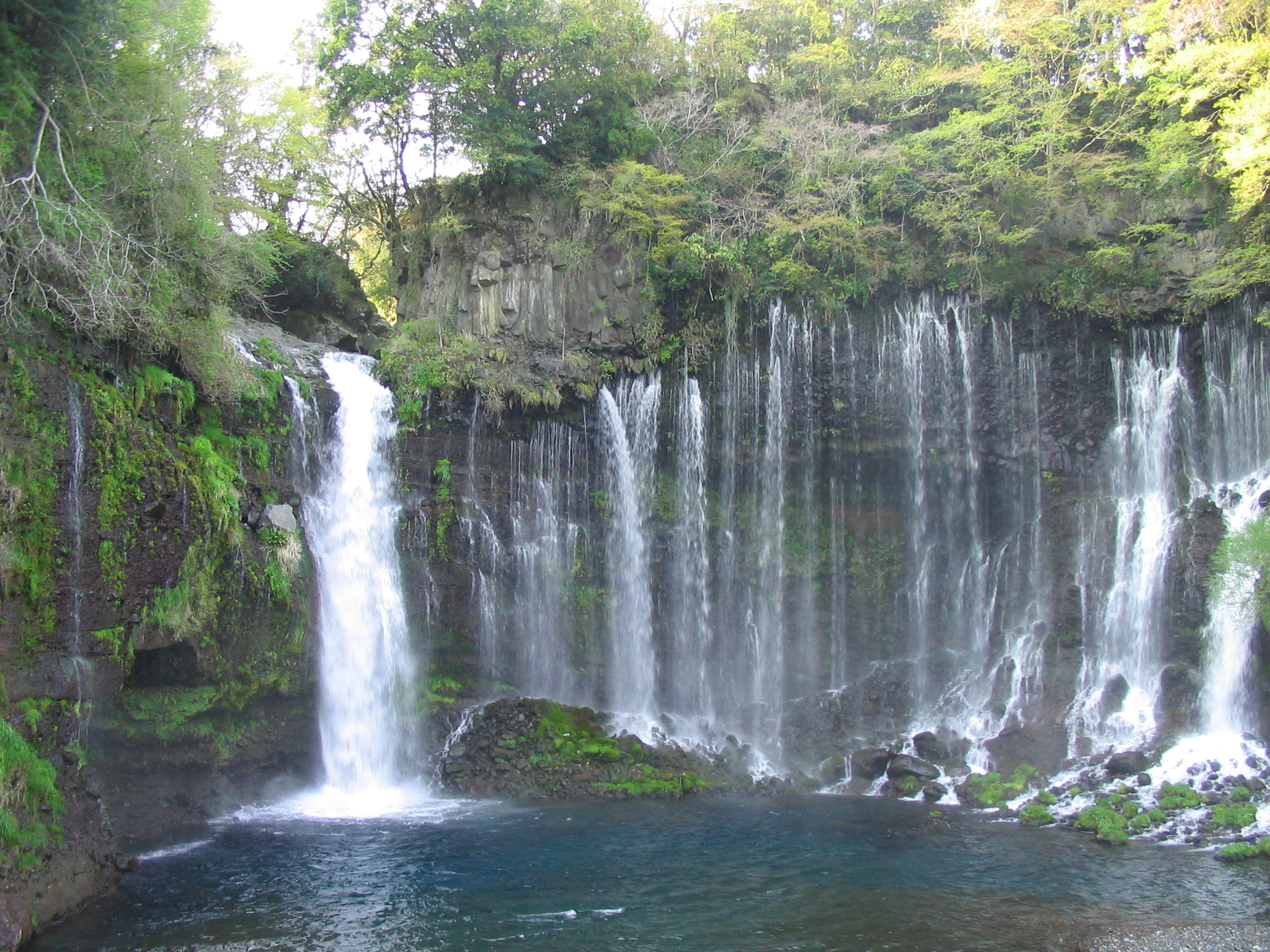
Shiraito Falls

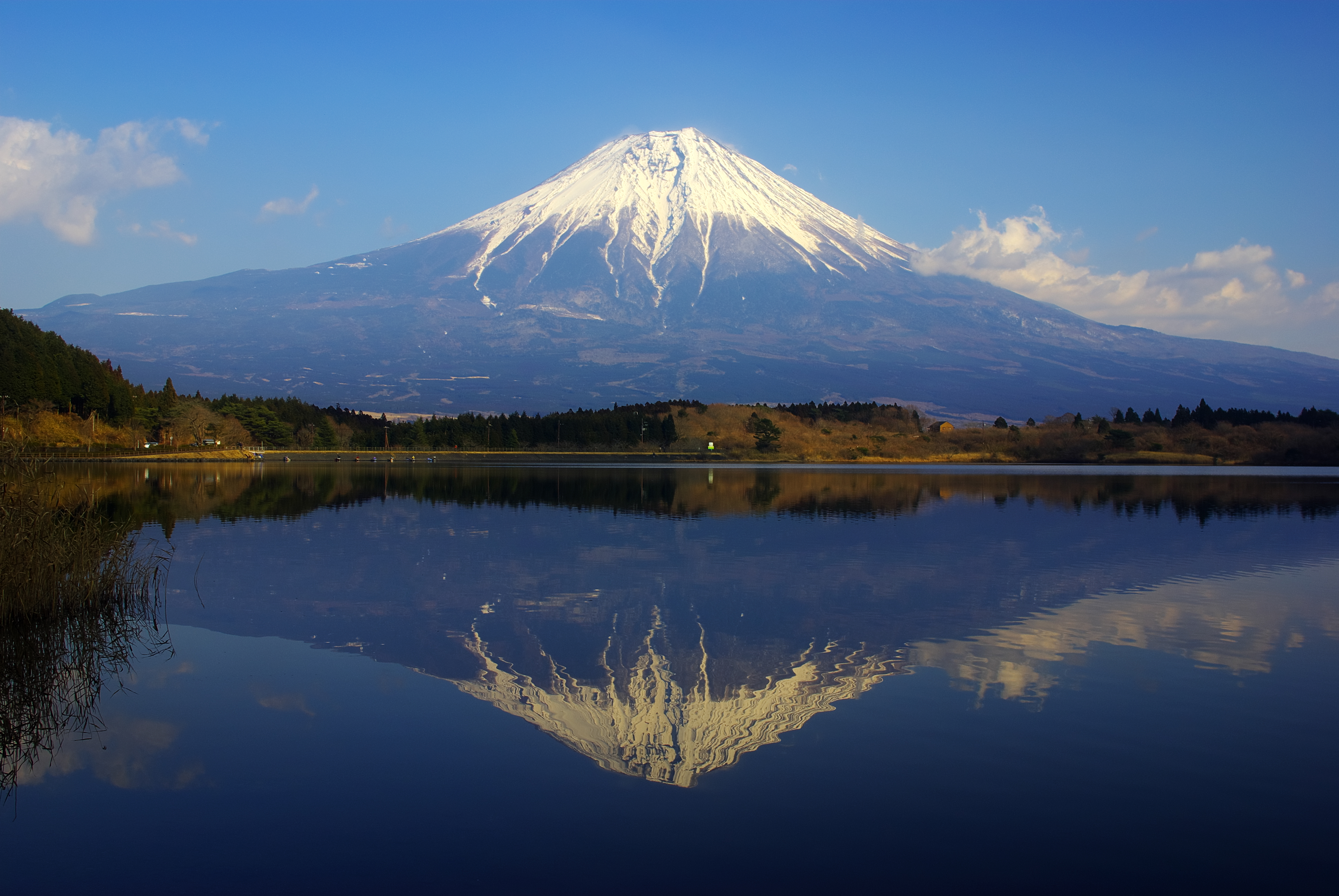
Lake Tanuki

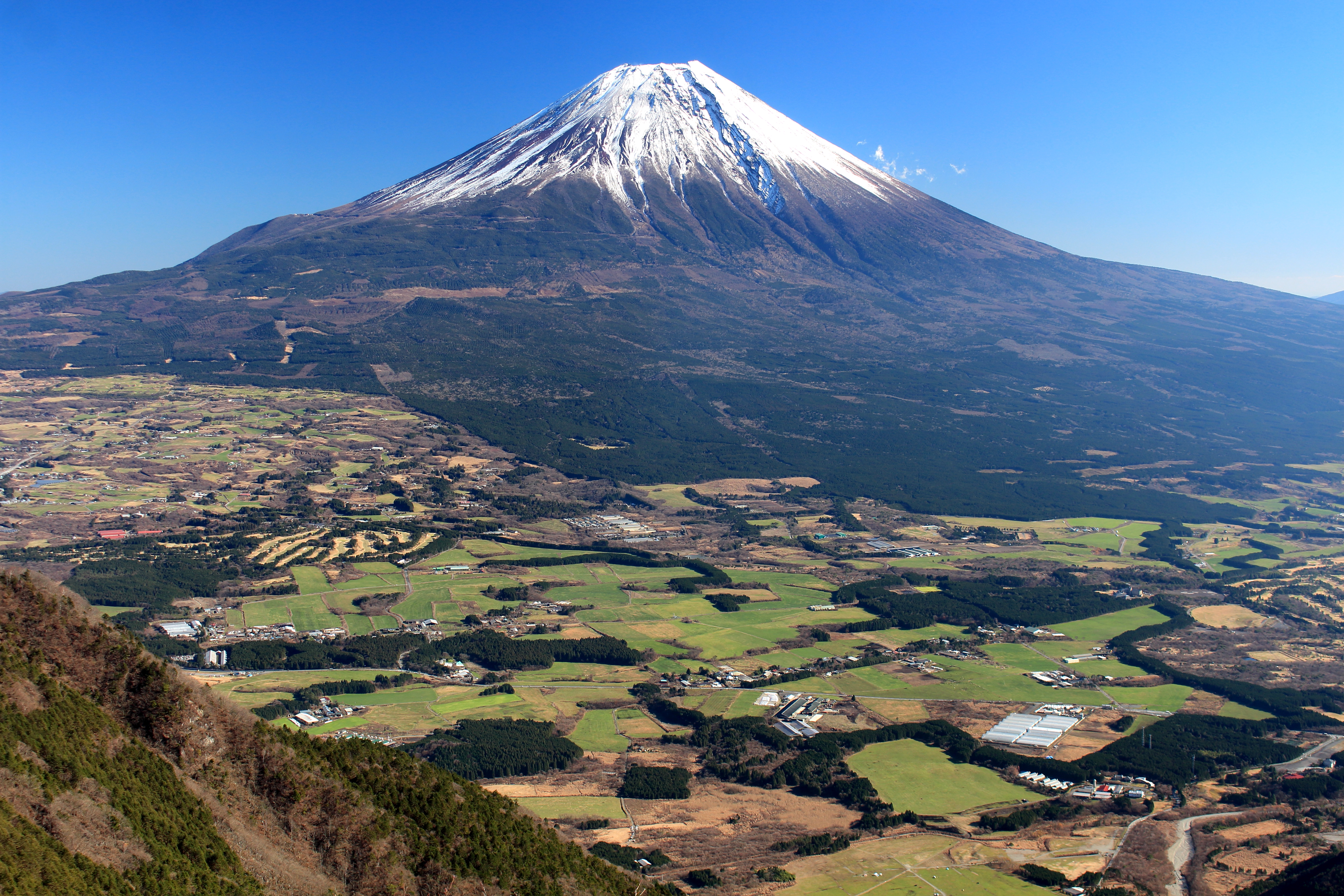
Asagiri Plateau

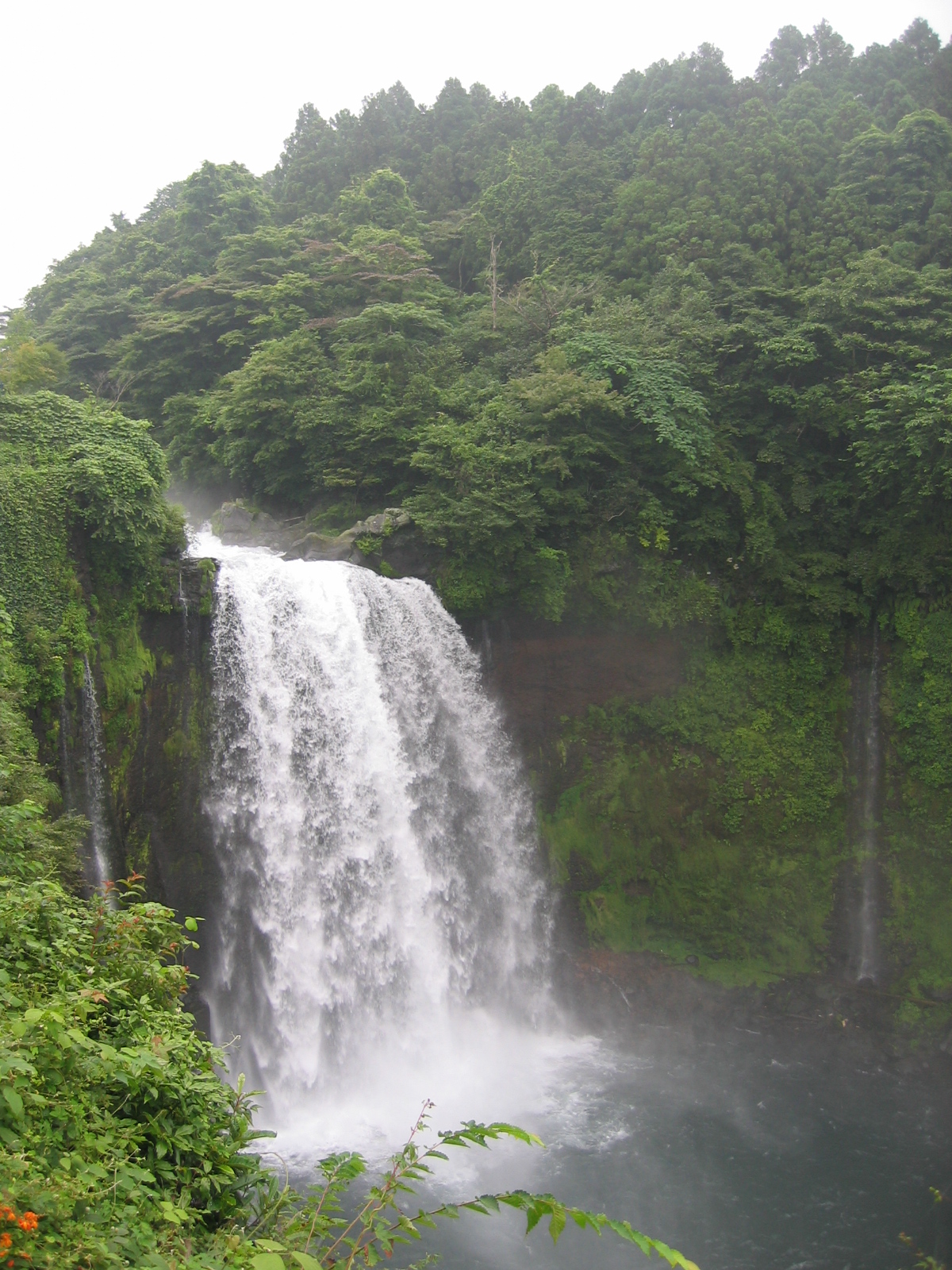
Otodome Falls

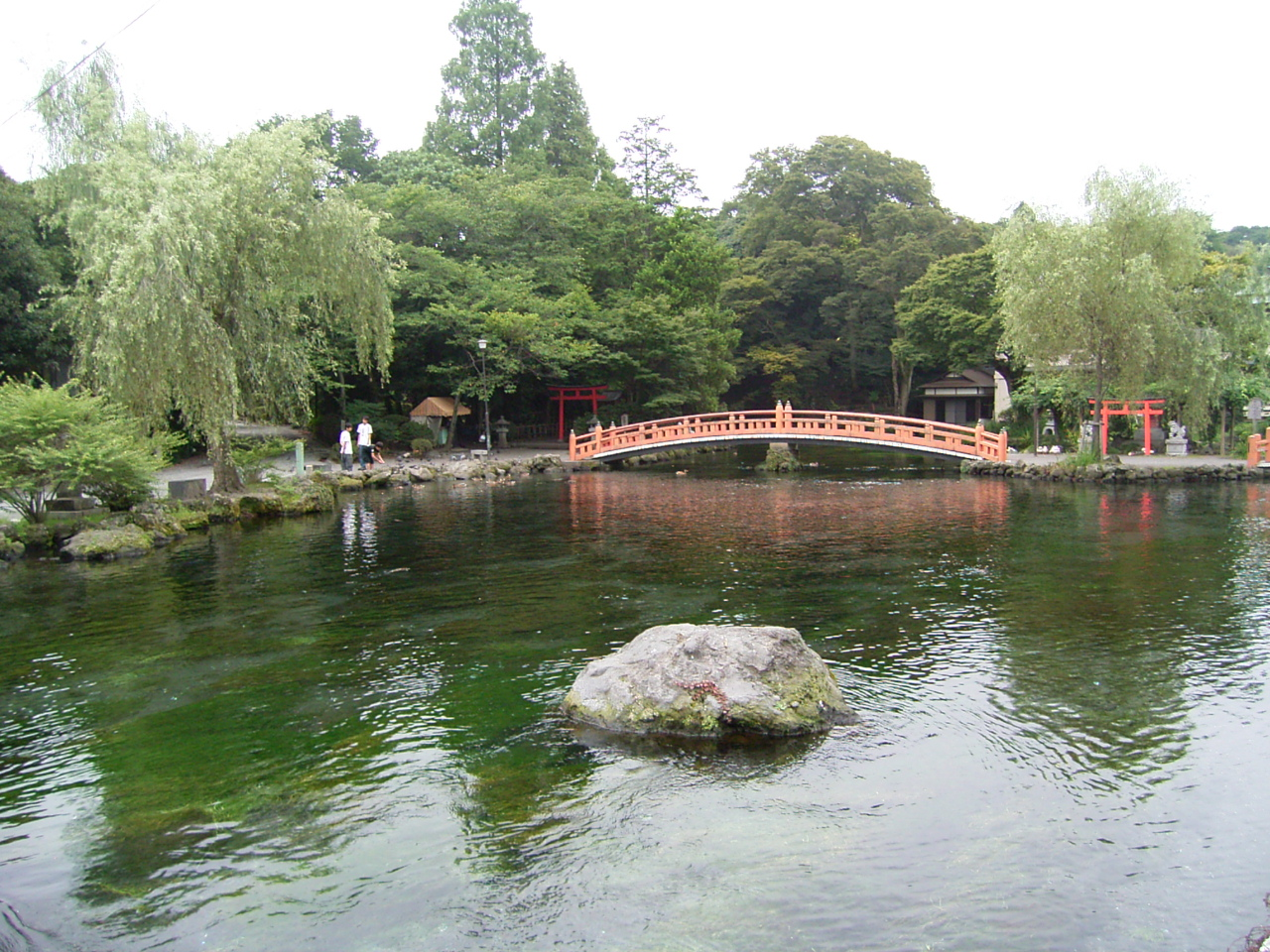
Wakutama Springs of Mount Fuji

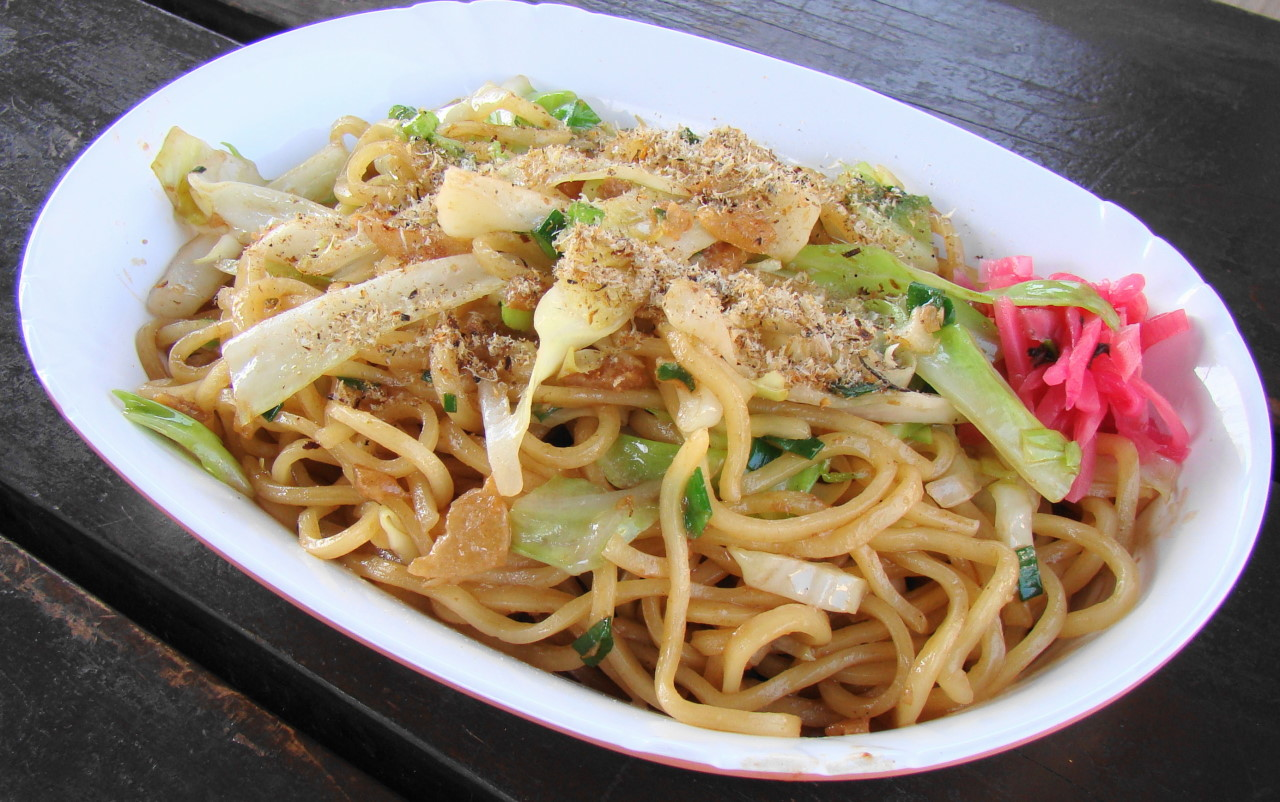
Fujinomiya yakisoba
