= List of cultural properties of Japan – paintings (Okayama) =

This list is of the cultural properties of Japan designated in the category of paintings (絵画, kaiga) for the Prefecture of Okayama.

== National Cultural Properties ==
As of 1 June 2020, twenty-nine Important Cultural Properties (including two *National Treasures) have been designated, being of national significance.

Property	Date	Municipality	Ownership	Comments	Image	Dimensions	Coordinates	Ref.
*Court Lady, colour on silk 絹本著色宮女図〈／伝桓野王図〉 kenpon chakushoku kyūjo zu (den-Kanya ō zu)	Yuan dynasty	Kurashiki	private	wearing a red gown and diaphanous black headdress, and with a flute tucked in her girdle; sometimes identified as the Eastern Jin Prince Huan Ye, known for his flute playing, based on a paper slip on a copy of the painting by Kanō Seisen'in Osanobu (狩野養信) in Tokyo National Museum; however labels by Kanō Tan'yū and Kanō Yasunobu and a document by Osanobu identify the subject as a court lady; the authenticity of the imprint "seal of Qian Xuan" (錢選之印) is uncertain		86.1 centimetres (33.9 in) by 29.9 centimetres (11.8 in)		
*Landscape, ink and light colour on paper, by Sesshū 紙本墨画淡彩山水図〈雪舟筆／〉 shihon bokuga tansai sansui zu (Sesshū hitsu)	Muromachi period	Kurashiki	private			118.0 centimetres (46.5 in) by 35.5 centimetres (14.0 in)		
N Family, oil on hemp cloth, by Koide Narashige; Nの家族（小出楢重筆 一九一九／油絵 麻布） enu no kazoku (Koide Narashige hitsu 1919 abura-e mafu)	1919	Kurashiki	Ohara Museum of Art			79.0 centimetres (31.1 in) by 91.0 centimetres (35.8 in)	34°35′46″N 133°46′14″E	
Aizen Myōō, colour on silk 絹本著色愛染明王像 kenpon chakushoku Aizen Myōō zō	Nanboku-chō period	Okayama	Hōtaku-ji (捧沢寺) (kept at Okayama Prefectural Museum)			109.4 centimetres (43.1 in) by 41.0 centimetres (16.1 in)	34°40′06″N 133°56′02″E	
Aizen Myōō, colour on silk 絹本著色愛染明王像 kenpon chakushoku Aizen Myōō zō	Nanboku-chō period	Okayama	Hōtaku-ji (捧沢寺) (kept at Okayama Prefectural Museum)			88 centimetres (35 in) by 40 centimetres (16 in)	34°40′06″N 133°56′02″E	
Ukita Yoshie, colour on silk 絹本著色宇喜多能家像 kenpon chakushoku Ukita Yoshie zō	1524	Okayama	Okayama Prefectural Museum				34°40′06″N 133°56′02″E	
Shaka Triad, colour on silk 絹本著色釈迦三尊像 kenpon chakushoku Shakan sanzon zō	Kamakura period	Nara	Raikyū-ji (kept at Nara National Museum)				34°41′01″N 135°50′11″E	
Ten Kings of Hell, colour on silk 絹本著色十王像 kenpon chakushoku jūō zu	Yuan dynasty	Okayama	Hōfuku-ji (宝福寺) (kept at Okayama Prefectural Museum)	ten scrolls		98.8 centimetres (38.9 in) by 41.5 centimetres (16.3 in)	34°40′06″N 133°56′02″E	
Twelve Deities, colour on silk, attributed to Zōun 絹本著色十二天像〈（伝増吽筆）／〉 kenpon chakushoku jūniten zō (den-Zōun hitsu)	Kamakura period	Mimasaka	Chōfuku-ji (長福寺)	twelve scrolls			34°55′36″N 134°09′02″E	
Along the River During the Qingming Festival, colour on silk 絹本著色清明上河図〈趙浙筆／萬暦五年十月の年記がある〉 kenpon chakushoku seimei jōga zu	Ming dynasty	Okayama	Hayashibara Museum of Art	one emakimono		28.7 centimetres (11.3 in) by 576 centimetres (18 ft 11 in)	34°39′49″N 133°56′00″E	
Jizō with the Ten Kings of Hell, colour on silk 絹本著色地蔵十王像 kenpon chakushoku Jizō jūō zu	late Goryeo	Kasaoka	Nikkō-ji (日光寺)	Goryeo Buddhist painting		117.1 centimetres (46.1 in) by 59.2 centimetres (23.3 in)	34°27′08″N 133°30′41″E	
Jizō Bosatsu, colour on silk 絹本著色地蔵菩薩像 kenpon chakushoku Jizō Bosatsu zō	Yuan dynasty	Okayama	Hōfuku-ji (宝福寺) (kept at Okayama Prefectural Museum)			111.0 centimetres (43.7 in) by 58.5 centimetres (23.0 in)	34°40′06″N 133°56′02″E	
Jizō Bosatsu, colour on silk 絹本著色地蔵菩薩像 kenpon chakushoku Jizō Bosatsu zō	Nanboku-chō period	Okayama	Hōtaku-ji (捧沢寺) (kept at Okayama Prefectural Museum)			91.6 centimetres (36.1 in) by 36.2 centimetres (14.3 in)	34°40′06″N 133°56′02″E	
Fudō with Three Attendants flanked by the Mandala of the Two Realms, colour on silk 絹本著色中不動三十六童子左右両界曼荼羅図 kenpon chakushoku Fudō sanjūroku dōji sayū ryōkai mandara zu	Nanboku-chō period	Okayama	Hōkō-ji (宝光寺) (kept at Okayama Prefectural Museum)	three scrolls			34°40′06″N 133°56′02″E	
Fudō Myōō, colour on silk 絹本著色不動明王像 kenpon chakushoku Fudō Myōō zō	Kamakura period	Okayama	Chōfuku-ji (長福寺) (kept at Okayama Prefectural Museum)				34°40′06″N 133°56′02″E	
Nirvana painting, colour on silk 絹本著色仏涅槃図 kenpon chakushoku Butsu nehan zu	Kamakura period	Okayama	Anyō-in (安養院) (kept at Okayama Prefectural Museum)				34°40′06″N 133°56′02″E	
Nirvana painting, colour on silk 絹本著色仏涅槃図 kenpon chakushoku Butsu nehan zu	Kamakura period	Kyoto	Henmyō-in (遍明院) (kept at Kyoto National Museum)				34°59′24″N 135°46′23″E	
Descent of Amida with Twenty-Five Bodhisattvas, colour on silk 絹本著色弥陀二十五菩薩来迎図 kenpon chakushoku Mida nijūgo bosatsu raigō zu	Kamakura period	Okayama	Henmyō-in (遍明院) (kept at Okayama Prefectural Museum)				34°40′06″N 133°56′02″E	
Mandala of the Two Realms, colour on silk 絹本著色弥陀二十五菩薩来迎図 kenpon chakushoku ryōkai mandara zu	Nanboku-chō period	Mimasaka	Chōfuku-ji (長福寺)				34°55′33″N 134°09′00″E	
Mount Lu, ink on silk, by Yujian 絹本墨画廬山図〈玉澗筆／自賛がある〉 kenpon bokuga rosan zu (Gyokkan hitsu)	Southern Song	Okayama	Okayama Prefectural Museum of Art				34°40′04″N 133°55′47″E	
Scenes in and around the Capital, colour on paper with gold ground, six-panel byōbu 紙本金地著色洛中洛外図〈／六曲屏風〉 shihon kinji chakushoku rakuchū rakugai zu (rokkyoku byōbu)	Edo period	Okayama	Hayashibara Museum of Art	pair of screens		159.1 centimetres (62.6 in) by 362.9 centimetres (142.9 in)	34°39′49″N 133°56′00″E	
Mountains clad in rain, light colour on paper, by Uragami Gyokudō 紙本淡彩山雨染衣図〈浦上玉堂筆／〉 shihon tansai sanu seni zu (Uragami Gyokudō hitsu)	Edo period	Kurashiki	private					
Flowers and Birds, colour on paper, by Hasegawa Tōhaku, six-panel byōbu 紙本著色花鳥図〈長谷川信春筆／六曲屏風〉 shihon chakushoku kachō zu (rokkyoku byōbu)	Momoyama period	Okayama	Myōkaku-ji (妙覚寺) (kept at Okayama Prefectural Museum)	pair of screens		149.5 centimetres (58.9 in) by 360 centimetres (140 in)	34°40′06″N 133°56′02″E	
Illustrated Sutra of Cause and Effect, colour on paper 紙本著色絵過去現在因果経〈残闕／〉 shihon chakushoku e-kako genzai inga-kyō	Nara period	Kurashiki	Ohara Museum of Art				34°35′46″N 133°46′14″E	
Morning View of the Uji River, colour on paper, by Aoki Mokubei 紙本著色兎道朝暾図〈青木木米筆／〉 shihon chakushoku Uji chōton zu (Aoki Mokubei hitsu)	Edo period	Kurashiki						
Landscape, ink on paper, by Sesshū 紙本墨画山水図〈雪舟筆／（仿玉澗）〉 shihon bokuga sansui zu (Sesshū hitsu)	Muromachi period	Okayama	Okayama Prefectural Museum of Art			30.3 centimetres (11.9 in) by 31.5 centimetres (12.4 in)	34°40′04″N 133°55′47″E	
Dragon, colour on paper, by Aoki Mokubei 紙本墨画騰竜図〈青木木米筆／癸未（文政六年）の款記がある〉 shihon chakushoku tōryū zu (Aoki Mokubei hitsu)	Edo period	Kurashiki						
Sorrow of Faith, oil on hemp cloth, by Sekine Shōji 信仰の悲しみ（関根正二筆 一九一八年／油絵 麻布） shinkō no kanashimi (Sekine Shōji hitsu 1918 abura-e mafu)	1918	Kurashiki	Ohara Museum of Art			73.0 centimetres (28.7 in) by 100.0 centimetres (39.4 in)	34°35′46″N 133°46′14″E	
Laozi, ink on paper, by Mokkei 紙本墨画老子像 牧𧮾筆 shihon bokuga Rōshi zu (Mōkkei hitsu)	C13	Okayama	Okayama Prefectural Museum of Art				34°40′04″N 133°55′47″E	

== Prefectural Cultural Properties ==
As of 22 January 2020, twenty-six properties have been designated at a prefectural level.

Property	Date	Municipality	Ownership	Comments	Image	Dimensions	Coordinates	Ref.
Thirteen Buddhas, colour on silk 絹本著色十三仏図 kenpon chakushoku jūsan Butsu zu	Nanboku-chō period	Okayama	Okayama Prefectural Museum			95.3 centimetres (37.5 in) by 38.1 centimetres (15.0 in)	34°40′06″N 133°56′02″E	
Portrait of the Temple Founder, colour on silk 絹本著色開山別峰国師頂相 kenpon chakushoku kaizan beppō kokushi chinzō	Muromachi period	Okayama	Shōrin-ji (松林寺)			94.5 centimetres (37.2 in) by 56.5 centimetres (22.2 in)	34°38′42″N 133°51′03″E	
Saidai-ji Engi, colour on paper 紙本著色金陵山古本縁起（西大寺縁起） ［二帖 附一帖］ shihon chakushoku Kinryōzan furuhon engi (Saidaiji engi)	1507	Okayama	Saidai-ji (西大寺) (kept at Okayama Prefectural Museum)	two scrolls, with supplementary designation of a scroll dating from after 1661			34°40′06″N 133°56′02″E	
Map of the World, light colour on paper, six-panel byōbu 紙本淡彩世界図屏風［六曲一双］ shihon tansai sekai zu byōbu (rokkyoku issō)	early Edo period	Okayama	Myōkaku-ji (妙覚寺) (kept at Okayama Prefectural Museum)	pair of screens		97 centimetres (38 in) by 270 centimetres (110 in)	34°40′06″N 133°56′02″E	
Along the River During the Qingming Festival, ink on paper, emaki 紙本墨画清明上河図巻 shihon bokuga seimei jōga zu maki	late Edo period	Okayama	Myōkaku-ji (妙覚寺) (kept at Okayama Prefectural Museum)			30.3 centimetres (11.9 in) by 571.2 centimetres (18 ft 8.9 in)	34°40′06″N 133°56′02″E	
Chrysanthemum Boy, six-panel byōbu 菊慈童図屏風［六曲一雙］ kiku jidō zu byōbu	early Edo period	Kurashiki	Rendai-ji (蓮台寺)	pair of screens		152.6 centimetres (60.1 in) by 351 centimetres (138 in)	34°30′20″N 133°51′02″E	
Myōkōni 妙向尼画像附妙向尼消息; Myōkōni gazō tsuketari Myōkōni shōzō	Momoyama period	Tsuyama	private	designation includes a related document		96.8 centimetres (38.1 in) by 39.5 centimetres (15.6 in)		
View of Edo, ink on paper, byōbu 紙本墨画淡彩江戸一目図屏風 shihon bokuga tansai Edo hitome zu byōbu	1809	Tsuyama	Tsuyama City Museum (津山郷土博物館)			176.0 centimetres (69.3 in) by 352.8 centimetres (138.9 in)	35°03′39″N 134°00′20″E	
Fudō Myōō with two attendants, ink on silk 絹本墨画不動明王二童子像 kenpon bokuga Fudō Myōō ni dōji zō	Nanboku-chō period	Tamano	Renge-an (蓮華庵)			75.0 centimetres (29.5 in) by 35.7 centimetres (14.1 in)	34°31′26″N 133°56′39″E	
Mandala of the Two Realms, ink on silk 絹本著色両界曼荼羅図 kenpon chakushoku ryōkai mandara zu	Kamakura period	Okayama	Jihō-in (持宝院) (kept at Okayama Prefectural Museum)	two scrolls		140.0 centimetres (55.1 in) by 124.2 centimetres (48.9 in)	34°40′06″N 133°56′02″E	
Fugen Bosatsu, ink on silk Monju Bosatsu, ink on silk 絹本著色普賢菩薩像 絹本著色文殊菩薩像 kenpon chakushoku Fugen Bosatsu zō kenpon chakushoku Monju Bosatsu zō	Kamakura period	Okayama	Chishō-in (智勝院) (kept at Okayama Prefectural Museum)	two scrolls		133 centimetres (52 in) by 53 centimetres (21 in)	34°40′06″N 133°56′02″E	
Parinirvana of the Buddha, ink on silk 絹本著色仏涅槃図 kenpon chakushoku Butsu nehan zu	Nanboku-chō period	Okayama	Hōfuku-ji (寳福寺) (kept at Okayama Prefectural Museum)				34°40′06″N 133°56′02″E	
Jakushitsu Genkō, ink on silk 絹本著色寂室元光頂相 kenpon chakushoku Jakushitsu Genkō chinzō	C14	Takahashi	Raikyū-ji (kept at Takahashi History and Art Museum (高梁市歴史美術館))				34°40′06″N 133°56′02″E	
Shaka Triad, colour on silk 絹本著色釈迦三尊像 kenpon chakushoku Shaka sanzon zō	Nanboku-chō period	Okayama	Jōmyō-ji (浄明寺) (kept at Okayama Prefectural Museum)			108 centimetres (43 in) by 64 centimetres (25 in)	34°40′06″N 133°56′02″E	
White-Robed Kannon, ink on silk 絹本墨画白衣観音図 kenpon bokuga Byakue Kannon zu	Muromachi period	Bizen	Senju-in (千手院)				34°45′39″N 134°15′23″E	
Sixteen Arhats, colour on silk 絹本著色十六羅漢像 kenpon chakushoku jūroku Rakan zō	C14	Okayama	Chōbō-ji (長法寺) (kept at Okayama Prefectural Museum)	sixteen scrolls		131.4 centimetres (51.7 in) by 53.8 centimetres (21.2 in)	34°40′06″N 133°56′02″E	
Western-style Ema from Wakamiya Hachimangū 若宮八幡宮欧風絵馬; Wakamiya Hachimangū ōfū ema	1792	Okayama	Wakamiya Hachimangū (若宮八幡宮) (kept at Okayama Prefectural Museum)	depicts Gan Jiang and Mo Ye, with western perspective; the inscription 暁嶽国綱 to the left is a nom de plume of Akita ranga artist Tashiro Tadakuni		109.5 centimetres (43.1 in) by 198.5 centimetres (78.1 in)	34°40′06″N 133°56′02″E	
Fugen Bosatsu, white drawing on silk 絹本白描普賢菩薩像 kenpon hakubyō Fugen Bosatsu zō	Yuan	Okayama	Kiyama-ji (木山寺) (kept at Okayama Prefectural Museum)			78.6 centimetres (30.9 in) by 36.4 centimetres (14.3 in)	34°40′06″N 133°56′02″E	
Ten Kings and Ten Buddhas, colour on silk 絹本著色遣迎二尊十王十仏図 kenpon chakushoku kengō ni son jū ō jū Butsu zu	Kamakura period	Okayama	Kiyama-ji (木山寺) (kept at Okayama Prefectural Museum)			121.2 centimetres (47.7 in) by 56.0 centimetres (22.0 in)	34°40′06″N 133°56′02″E	
Descent of the Amida Triad with Ten Buddhas, colour on silk 絹本著色阿弥陀三尊十仏来迎図 kenpon chakushoku Amida sanzon jū Butsu raigō zu	Nanboku-chō period	Okayama	Kiyama-ji (木山寺) (kept at Okayama Prefectural Museum)			105 centimetres (41 in) by 40 centimetres (16 in)	34°40′06″N 133°56′02″E	
Thirteen Buddhas, colour on silk 絹本著色十三仏図 kenpon chakushoku jūsan Butsu zu	C15	Okayama	Kiyama-ji (木山寺) (kept at Okayama Prefectural Museum)			93.0 centimetres (36.6 in) by 37.8 centimetres (14.9 in)	34°40′06″N 133°56′02″E	
Parinirvana of the Buddha, colour on silk 絹本著色仏涅槃図 kenpon chakushoku Butsu nehan zu	C15	Asakuchi	Myōō-in (明王院)			188.0 centimetres (74.0 in) by 161.1 centimetres (63.4 in)	34°31′10″N 133°35′32″E	
Descent of the Amida Triad, colour on silk 絹本著色阿弥陀三尊来迎図 kenpon chakushoku Amida sanzon raigō zu	C14	Okayama	Gion-ji (元恩寺) (kept at Okayama Prefectural Museum)				34°40′06″N 133°56′02″E	
Descent of the Amida Triad, embroidered silk 繍帳阿弥陀三尊来迎図 shūchō Amida sanzon raigō zu	early Muromachi period	Kumenan	Tanjō-ji (誕生寺)			64 centimetres (25 in) by 27 centimetres (11 in)	34°57′19″N 133°57′11″E	
Mandala of the Two Realms, colour on silk 絹本著色両界曼荼羅図 kenpon chakushoku ryōkai mandara zu	Kamakura period	Okayama	Honsan-ji (本山寺) (kept at Okayama Prefectural Museum)	two scrolls		150.2 centimetres (59.1 in) by 136.8 centimetres (53.9 in) and 148.2 centimetres (58.3 in) by 136.7 centimetres (53.8 in)	34°40′06″N 133°56′02″E	
Thirty-Three Forms of Kannon Bosatsu, Fudō Myōō, Bishamon, painted wooden panels 板絵観世音菩薩三十三身応現図及び板絵不動・毘沙門図 ita-e Kanzeon Bosatsu sanjūsanshin ōgen zu oyobi ita-e Fudō Bishamon zu	early Muromachi period	Okayama	Honsan-ji (本山寺) (kept at Okayama Prefectural Museum)	thirty-five painted panels; restored in 1690 according to an ink inscription on the reverse			34°40′06″N 133°56′02″E	

== See also ==
- Cultural Properties of Japan
- List of National Treasures of Japan (paintings)
- Japanese painting
- List of Historic Sites of Japan (Okayama)
- List of Cultural Properties of Japan - historical materials (Okayama)
