= Fukuzen-ji =

Buddhist temple in Hiroshima Prefecture, Japan

- 福禅寺
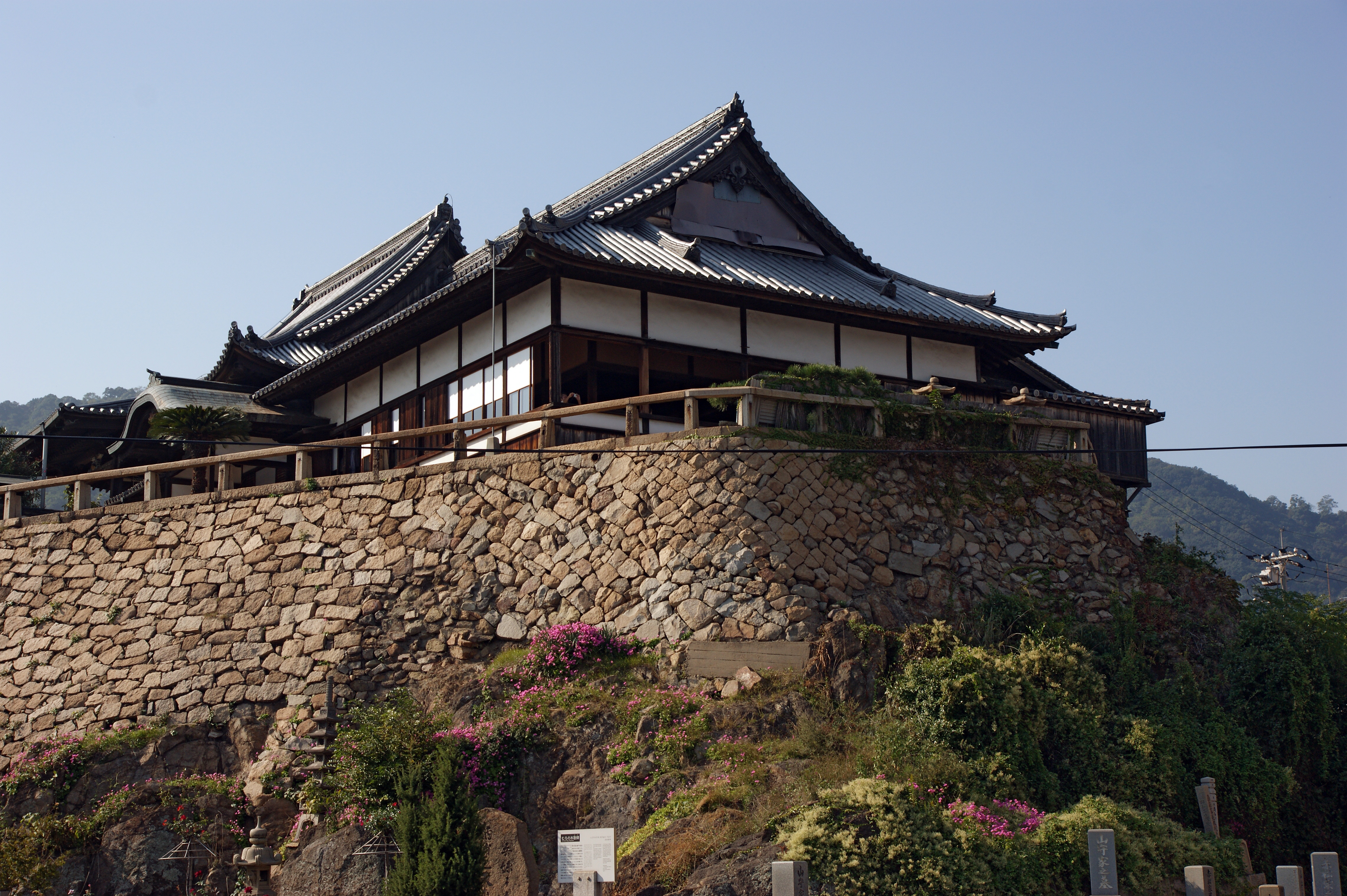
- Fukuzen-ji

- Location within Hiroshima Prefecture Location within Japan

Religion
- Affiliation: Buddhist
- Rite: Shingon-shu
- Status: functional

Location
- Location: 2 Tomo-machi, Fukuyama-shi, Hiroshima-ken
- Country: Japan
- Interactive map of Fukuzen-ji
- Coordinates: 34°22′59.08″N 133°23′0.1″E

Architecture
- Founder: c.Kūya
- Completed: c.950

Fukuzen-ji (福禅寺) is a Buddhist temple located in the Tomo-machi neighborhood of the city of Fukuyama, Hiroshima Prefecture, Japan. The temple's full name is Kaigan-zan Senjū-in Fukuzen-ji (海岸山 千手院 福禅寺), and it belongs Daikaku-ji branch of the Shingon-shu of Japanese Buddhism.

== History ==
The temple was founded around 950 in the Heian period by the itinerant monk Kūya, although the early history of the temple's largely conjectural. The oldest existing structure is the Reception Hall, which was constructed in the Genroku era, around 1650, of then Edo Period. The temple is noted primarily for its role as a guest house for Korean envoys, and it became a place of interaction with Japanese scholars of Chinese medicine and Chinese calligraphy. In 1711 Lee Seon-young, an official in charge of the Korean delegation, praised the view from the Reception Hall as the best scenic beauty in Japan, and in 1748 Chief envoy Hong Gye-hee named the Reception Hall 'Taichōrō'.

=== Joseon missions to Japan ===
Since ancient times, Tomo prospered as a port on the Seto Inland Sea, where ships shelter while for waiting for winds and tides. These included the official diplomatic envoys from Korea to Japan, who were sent twelve times during the Edo period. These missions consisted of several hundred people, led by three ambassadors. The delegation traveled 2,200 kilometers each way from Hanyang to Edo, taking eight months to a year to make the round trip. The route was fixed: Busan to Tsushima, Iki, Ainoshima, Akama, via the Seto Inland Sea, Kaminoseki, Shimokamagari, Tomo, Ushimado, Murotsu, Hyōgo, Osaka. The delegation's boats then anchored, and the delegation transferred to river barges and headed up the Yodo River. After passing through Kyoto, Ōtsu, and Kusatsu the delegation left the Nakasendō at Koshinohara in Yasu and passes through the Chōsenjin Kaidō. After Hikone, it returned to the Nakasendō again at Toriimoto, and headed for Edo via the Tōkaidō via Ōgaki and Nagoya. Of these sites relations to this journey, three locations were designated National Historic Sites in 1994: Fukuzen-ji in Fukuyama, Hiroshima, Honren-ji in Ushimado, and Seiken-ji in Okitsu. At the three temples mentioned above, artifacts such as plaques and Chinese poems left by delegation have been preserved.

The scenery of Tomo was already appreciated by Koreans even before Taichōrō was built, and Lee Kyeong-seop, who was an official in charge in 1617, wrote, "When you reach Jilpo, it is the most beautiful and strange." In addition, the "Fuso Diary" by the chief envoy, Cho Seo, in 1655, the "Fuso Roku" by Nan Long Yi, the "Tojo Nikroku" by the translator, Kim Seon-nam, and other diaries and records, give high praise for the temple's location and scenery. However, after 1711, both the temple and Taichoro fell into disrepair, though not uninhabited, and when the next embassy visited the site in 1748, another facility was designated as a lodging. The party was indignant at this situation, and after staying overnight on the ship in protest instead of the new lodgings, Hong Qixi, who was the chief envoy, went to Fukuzen-ji by force, comforting the monks and demanding its return as the officially-designated lodgings. He wrote an inscription renaming the Reception Hall as "Taichōrō", had it copied by his son Hong Jinghai, who was also a military officer, and gave it to the monks. The letters on the extant flat plaque at the temple is a copy of this. When the next embassy visited in 1763, the delegation described with deep emotion their pleasure that the temple had been restored as the official lodgings.

The temple briefly played role in the Bakumatsu period when it served as a place of negotiation between Sakamoto Ryoma's Kaientai and Kishū Domain of compensation for the accidental sinking of the Kaientai's steamship Iroha-maru en route to Tosa Domain with a cargo of western weaponry.

The temple is approximately 30 minutes by bus from Fukuyama Station.

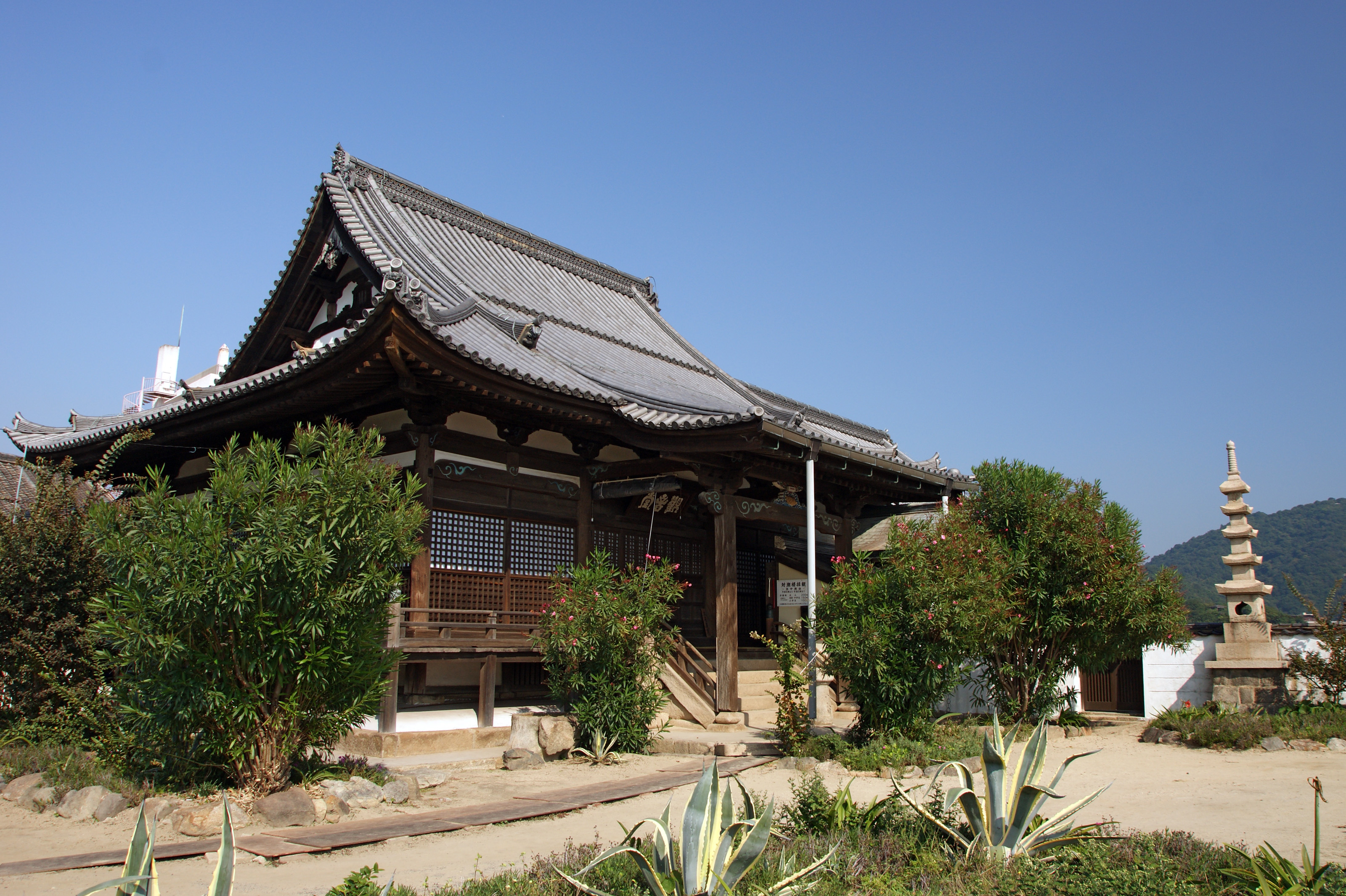
Hondō

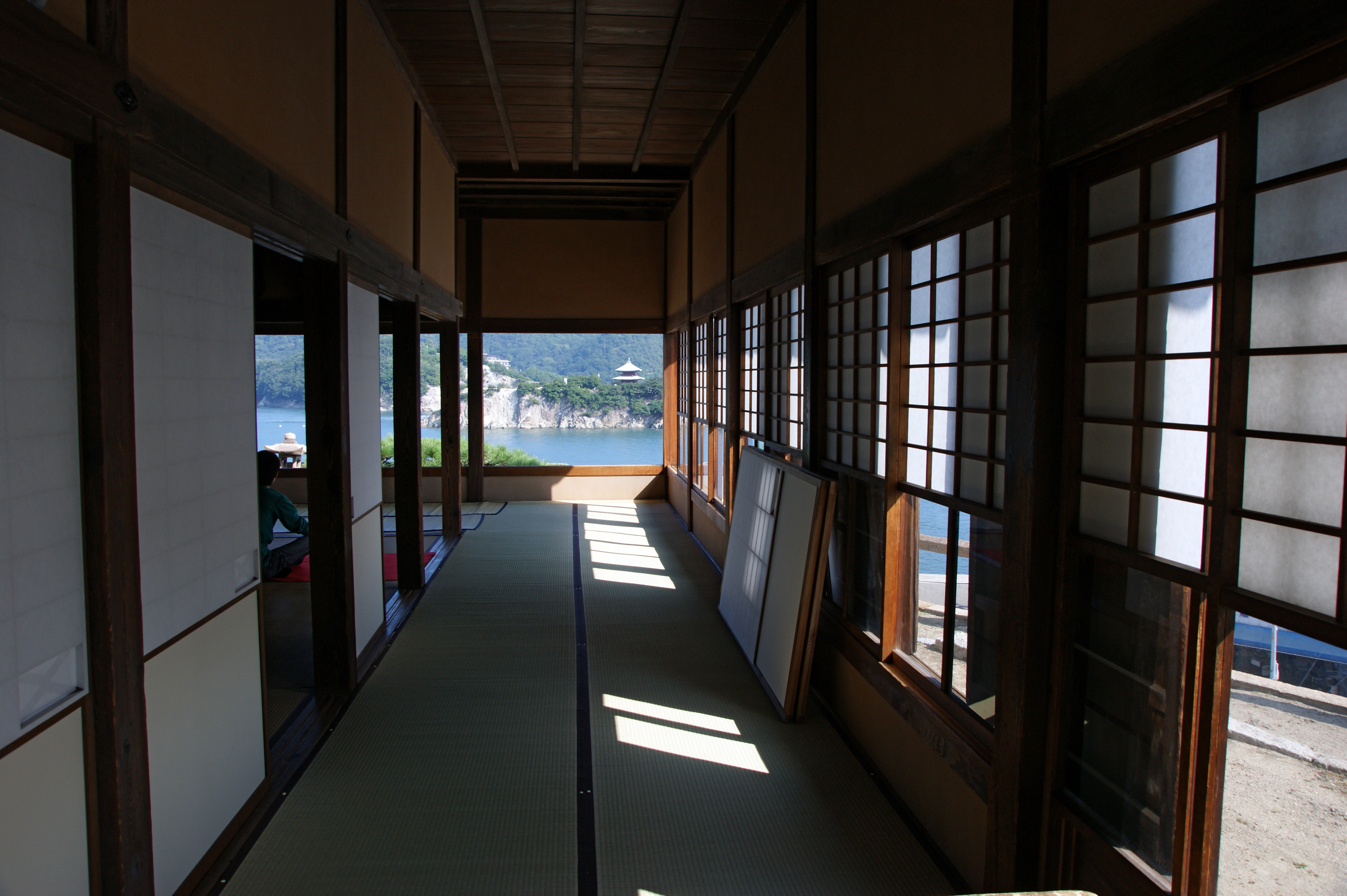
Interior of Reception Hall

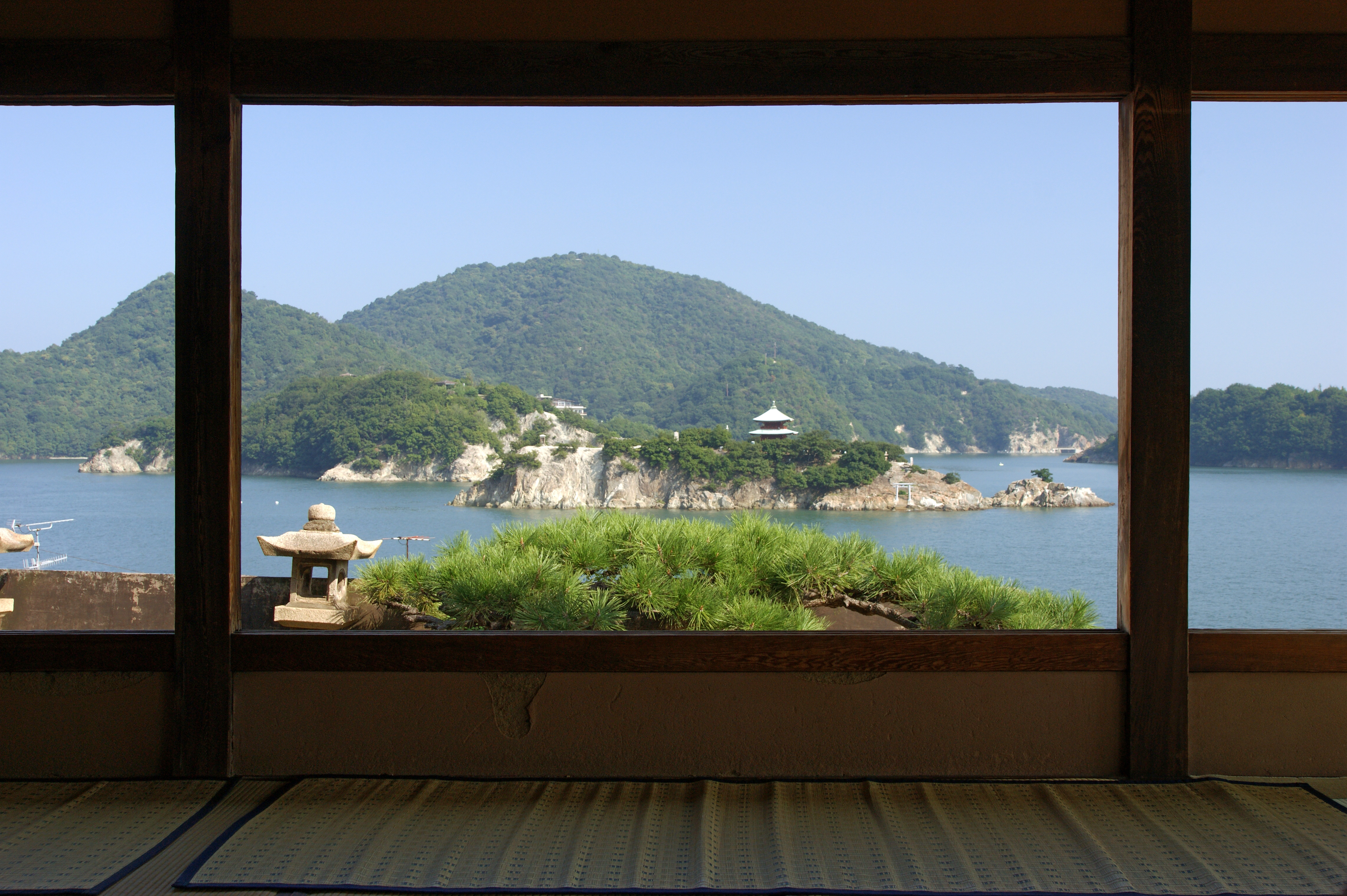
View from Reception Hall

== See also ==
- List of Historic Sites of Japan (Hiroshima)
- Joseon missions to Japan
