= Honren-ji =

Buddhist temple in Okayama Prefecture, Japan

- 本蓮寺
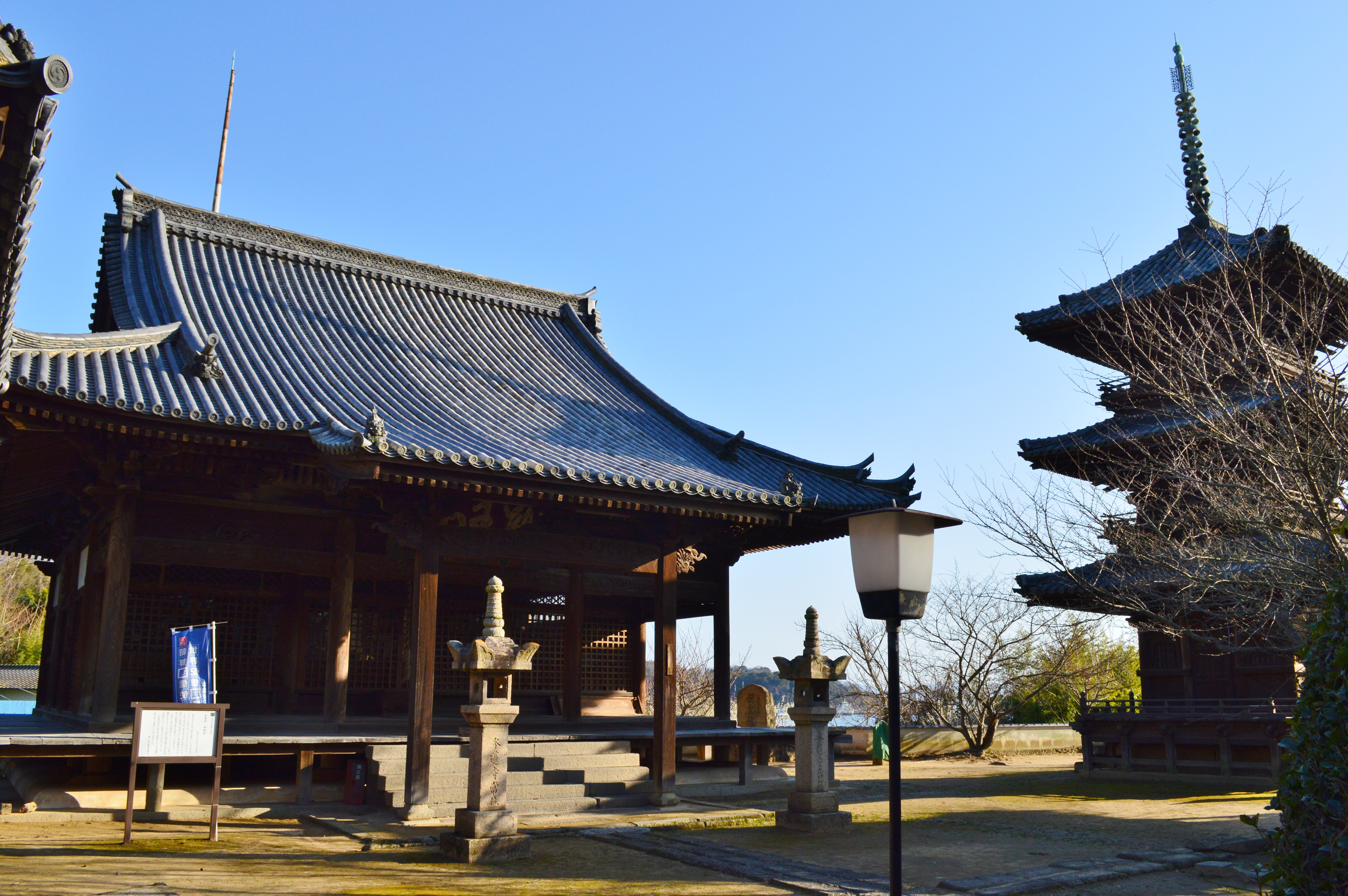
- Honren-ji Hondō, 3-story Pagoda

- Location within Okayama Prefecture Location within Japan

Religion
- Affiliation: Buddhist
- Rite: Nichiren-shū
- Status: functional

Location
- Location: 3194 Ushimadocho Ushimado, Setouchi-shi, Okayama-ken 701-4302
- Country: Japan
- Interactive map of Honren-ji
- Coordinates: 34°37′0.23″N 134°9′50.63″E

Architecture
- Founder: Daikaku Daisōjō
- Completed: c.1328 or 1347
- National Historic Site of Japan

Honren-ji (本蓮寺) is a Buddhist temple located in the Ushimado neighborhood of the city of Setouchi, Okayama Prefecture, Japan. The temple's full name is Kyōōsan Honren-ji (経王山 本蓮寺), and it belongs jointly to the Hokkeshū Honmonryū branch of the Nichiren-shu of Japanese Buddhism.

== History ==
The temple was founded in either 1338 or 1347 by Daikaku Daisōjō, the head priest of Myokenji Temple in Kyoto, who instructed Ishihara Sado-no-kami (who was of the local ruling family of Ushimado) on the Lotus Sutra). It appears in historical documents only from 1450, where it is styled the "Ushimado-ura Hokke-dō". The current Main Hall was reconstructed in 1492, and is a National Important Cultural Property, as are the Middle Gate and the East and West Banjin-dō chapels. The temple gardens were designed by Kobori Enshū.

=== Joseon missions to Japan ===
Since ancient times, Ushimado prospered as a port on the Seto Inland Sea, where ships shelter while for waiting for winds and tides. These included the official diplomatic envoys from Korea to Japan, who were sent twelve times during the Edo period, and which, through interaction between the delegation and Japanese writers and scholars, which had a great impact on culture. The mission consisted of several hundred people, led by three ambassadors. The delegation traveled 2,200 kilometers each way from Hanyang to Edo, taking eight months to a year to make the round trip. The route was fixed: Busan to Tsushima, Iki, Ainoshima, Akama, via the Seto Inland Sea, Kaminoseki, Shimokamagari, Tomo, Ushimado, Murotsu, Hyōgo, Osaka. The delegation's boat then anchored, and the delegation transferred to river barges and headed up the Yodo River. After passing through Kyoto, Ōtsu, and Kusatsu the delegation left the Nakasendō at Koshinohara in Yasu and passes through the Chōsenjin Kaidō. After Hikone, it returned to the Nakasendō again at Toriimoto, and headed for Edo via the Tōkaidō via Ōgaki and Nagoya. Of these sites relations to this journey, three locations were designated National Historic Sites in 1994: Fukuzen-ji in Fukuyama, Honren-ji in Ushimado, and Seiken-ji in Okitsu. At the three temples mentioned above, artifacts such as plaques and Chinese poems left by delegation have been preserved.

Ushimado only provided water and food during the first and second missions. For the third to the sixth missions, Honren-ji was a place of lodging for the three Korean envoys. The lodging place was moved to a teahouse from the seventh mission, but the temple continued to be used by lesser members of the mission and for meetings with dignitaries from Okayama Domain. Nine scrolls of historical documents related to Korean envoys retained at the temple are designated as Okayama Prefectural Important Cultural Properties. In addition, Ushimado has a tradition of Karako Odori, a folk dance which is said to have originated from the Korean envoys.

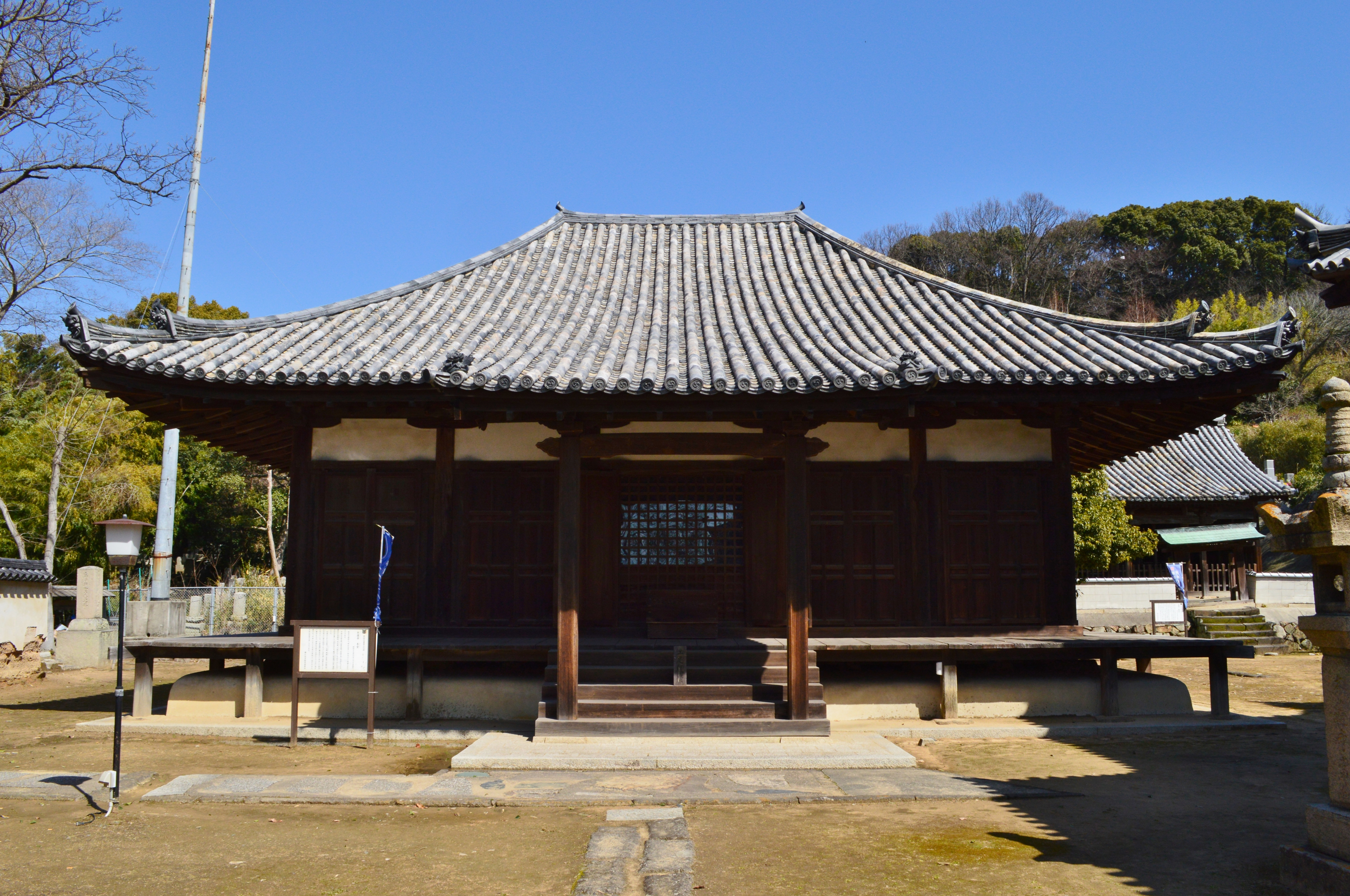
Hondō (ICP)

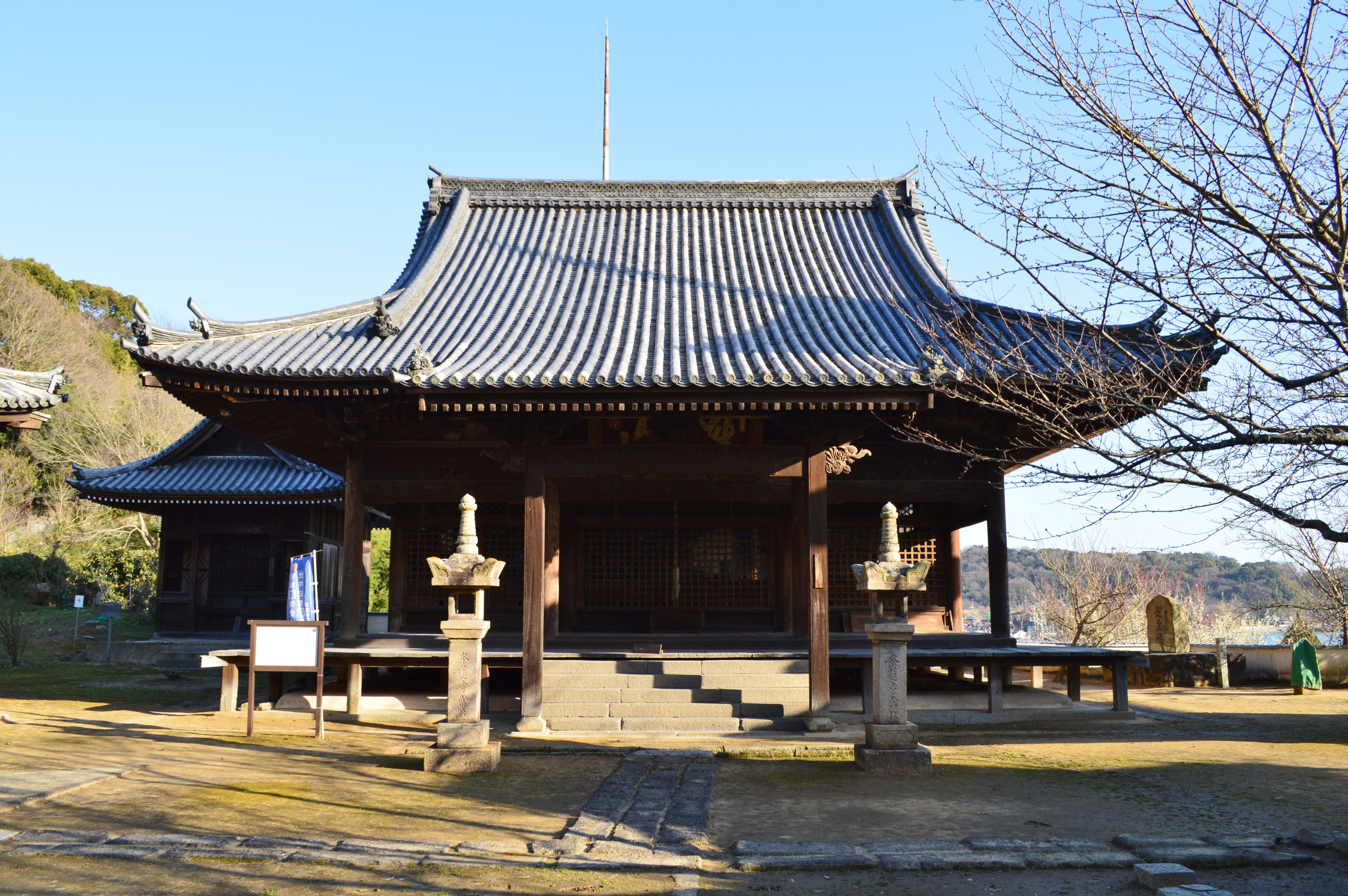
Soshi-dō (Okayama Prefectural ICP)

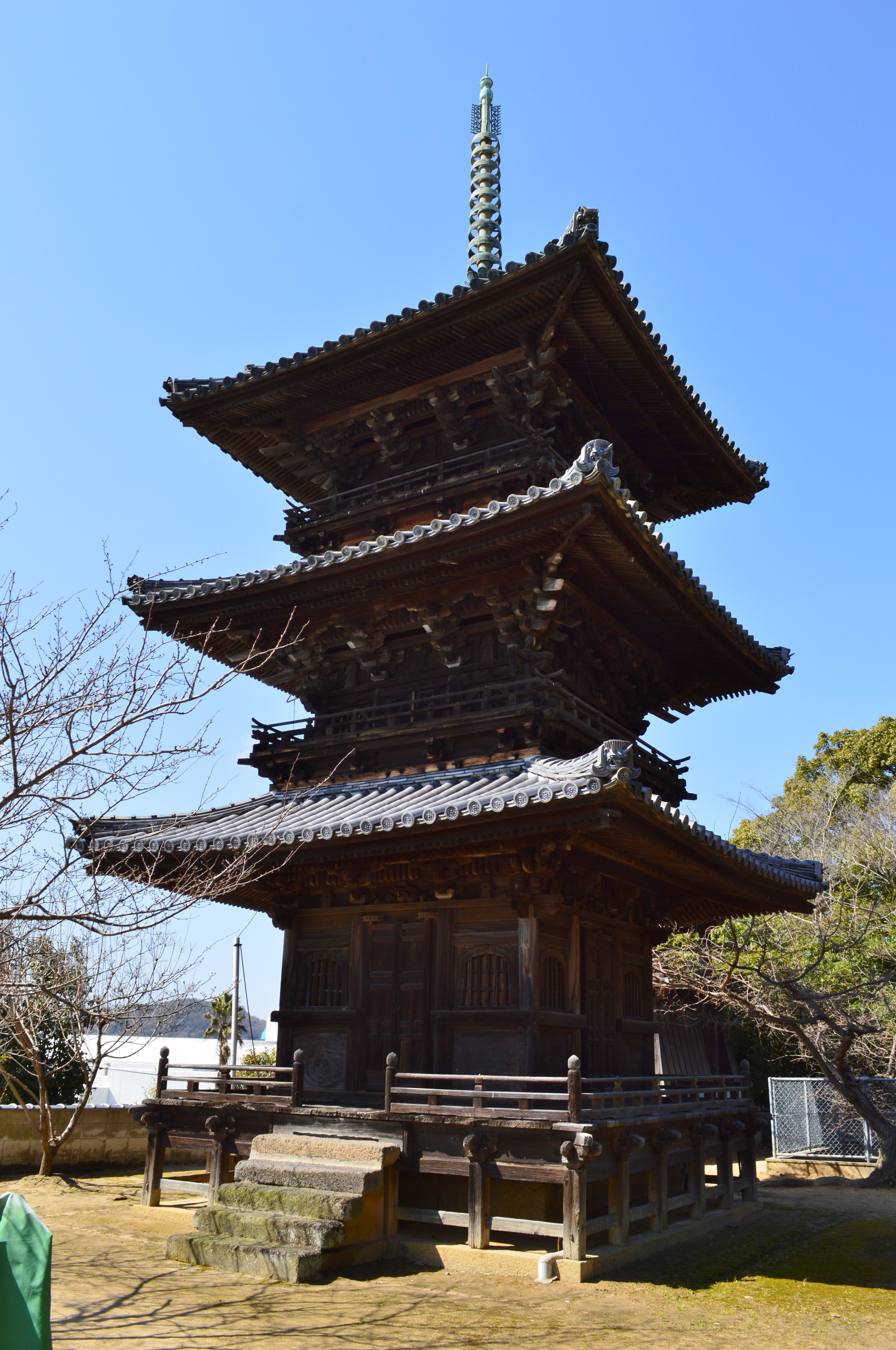
Three-story Pagoda (Okayama Prefectural ICP)

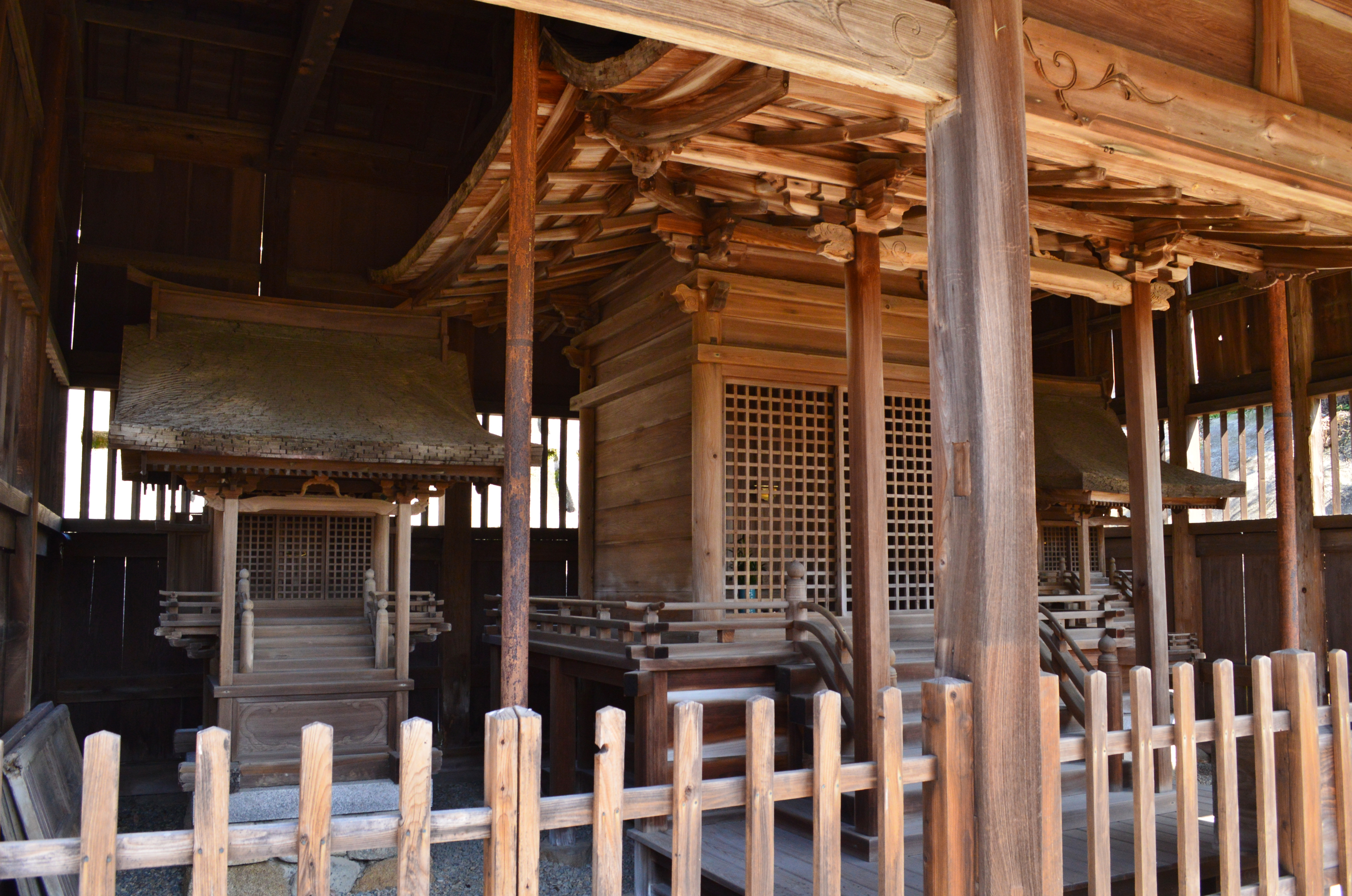
Banshin-dō (ICP)

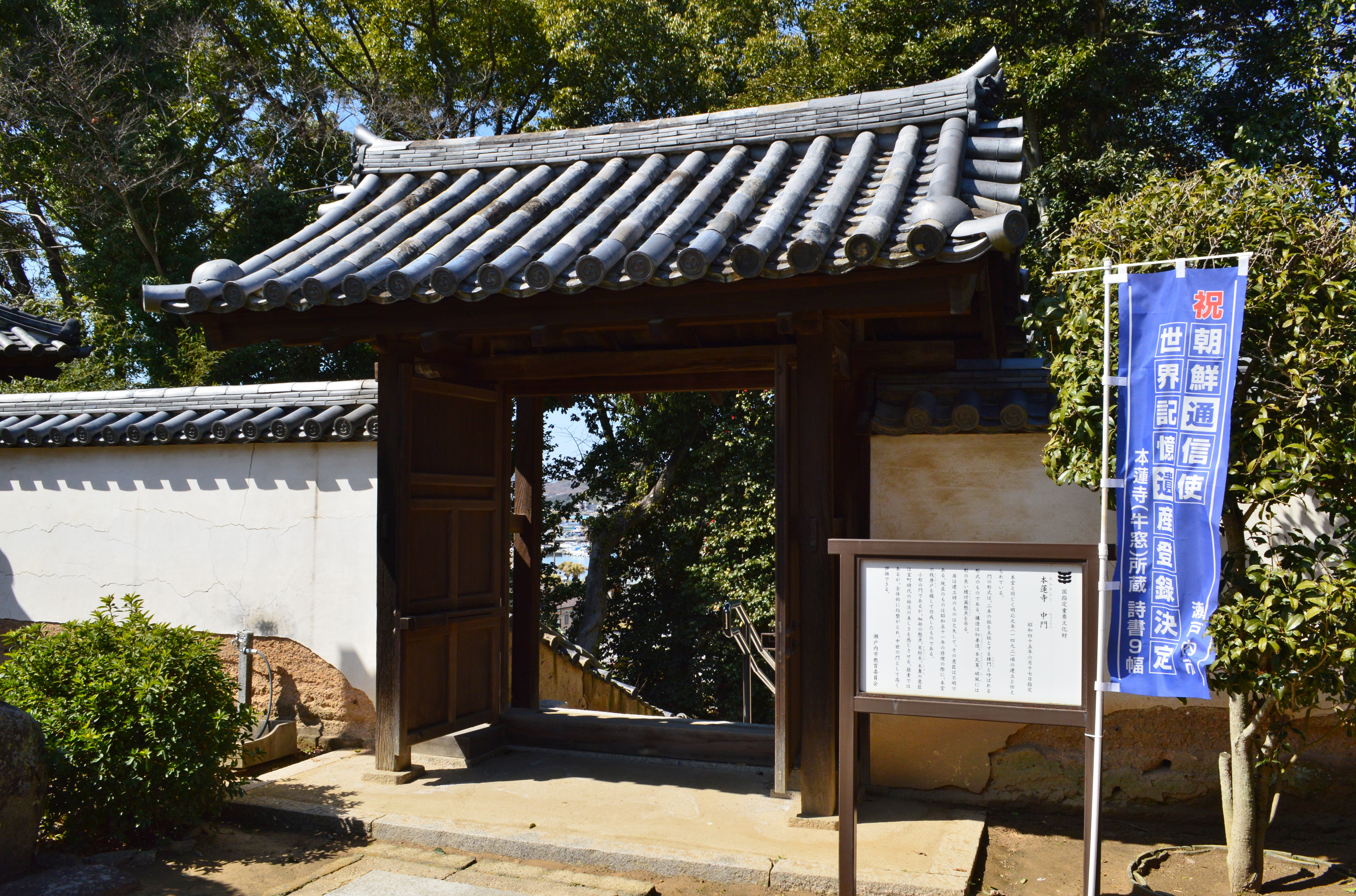
Middle Gate (ICP)

== See also ==
- List of Historic Sites of Japan (Okayama)
- List of Cultural Properties of Japan - historical materials (Okayama)
- Joseon missions to Japan
