= List of cultural properties of Japan – historical materials (Okayama) =

This list is of the cultural properties of Japan designated in the category of historical materials (歴史資料, rekishi shiryō) for the prefecture of Okayama.

== National Cultural Properties ==
As of 1 February 2017, two Important Cultural Properties have been designated, being of national significance.

Property	Date	Municipality	Ownership	Comments	Image	Coordinates	Ref.
Nautical chart of Asia, colour on parchment アジア航海図<（羊皮紙著色）／> Ajia kōkai-zu (yōhishi chakushoku)>	Momoyama period	Okayama	Hayashibara Museum of Art			34°39′49″N 133°56′00″E	
Materials relating to the Shizutani School 閑谷学校関係資料; Shizutani gakkō kankei shiryō	Edo period	Okayama	Okayama Prefecture (kept at Okayama Prefectural Museum)	4,041 items		34°40′06″N 133°56′02″E	

== Prefectural Cultural Properties ==
As of 29 November 2016, eight properties have been designated at a prefectural level.

Property	Date	Municipality	Ownership	Comments	Image	Coordinates	Ref.
Okayama Domain School and Shizutani School wooden plaques, with original calligraphy for the Shizutani School Taiseiden and Hōretsu Shrine wooden plaques 岡山藩学校及び閑谷学校扁額類 ２枚 ３幅 附閑谷学校大成殿及び芳烈祠扁額本紙２幅; Okayama-han gakkō oyobi Shizutani gakkō hengaku-rui tsuketari Shizutani gakkō Taiseiden oyobi Hōretsu hokora hengaku honshi	Edo period	Okayama	Hayashibara Museum of Art	7 items		34°39′49″N 133°56′00″E	for all refs see
Manuscripts, favourite books, and historical materials relating to Jakugon 寂厳筆写・手沢本及び関係史料; Jakugon hissha shutakubon oyobi kankei shiryō	C18	Kurashiki	Hōtō-ji (宝島寺)	585 items		34°33′19″N 133°43′43″E	
Spear coverings 大身槍 熊毛槍鞘付 附 黒熊毛鞘; Ōmi yari kumage yarizaya-tsuki tsuketari kuro kumage zaya	C19	Tsuyama	Tsuyama City (kept at Tsuyama City Museum (津山郷土博物館))	6 items		35°03′39″N 134°00′21″E	
Documents from the Bitchū-Matsuyama Domain School collection 備中松山藩校有終館蔵書; Bitchū-Matsuyama han-kō yūshūkan zōsho	Edo to Meiji period	Takahashi	Takahashi City (kept at Takahashi Folk Museum (高梁市郷土資料館))	4,003 items		34°47′41″N 133°37′04″E	
Historical materials relating to the Shizutani Junior High School 閑谷中学校関係歴史資料; Shizutani chūgakkō kankei rekishi shiryō	C20	Bizen	Okayama Prefecture	3,002 items		34°47′49″N 134°13′05″E	
Materials relating to the Joseon Missions 朝鮮通信使関係資料; Chōsen tsūshinshi kankei shiryō	Edo period	Okayama	Honren-ji (本蓮寺) (kept at Okayama Prefectural Museum)	9 scrolls		34°40′06″N 133°56′02″E	
Kamogata Domain gun carriage 鴨方藩の砲車; Kamogata han no hōsha	C19	Okayama	Ōura Jinja (大浦神社) (kept at Okayama Prefectural Museum)			34°40′06″N 133°56′02″E	
Lantern clock 櫓時計; Yagura-dokei	Edo period	Kumenan	Tanjō-ji (誕生寺)			34°57′20″N 133°57′10″E	

== See also ==
- Cultural Properties of Japan
- List of National Treasures of Japan (historical materials)
- List of Historic Sites of Japan (Okayama)
- Okayama Prefectural Museum
