= Hayashibara =

Hayashibara may refer to:

== Places ==
- Hayashibara Museum of Art, in Japan, housing the collection of Ichiro Hayashibara
- Hayashibara Co., Ltd.

== People ==
- Megumi Hayashibara (林原 めぐみ; born 1967), Japanese voice actress and singer
