= Okayama Prefectural Museum of Art =

Art museum in Okayama, Japan

Okayama Prefectural Museum of Art 岡山県立美術館
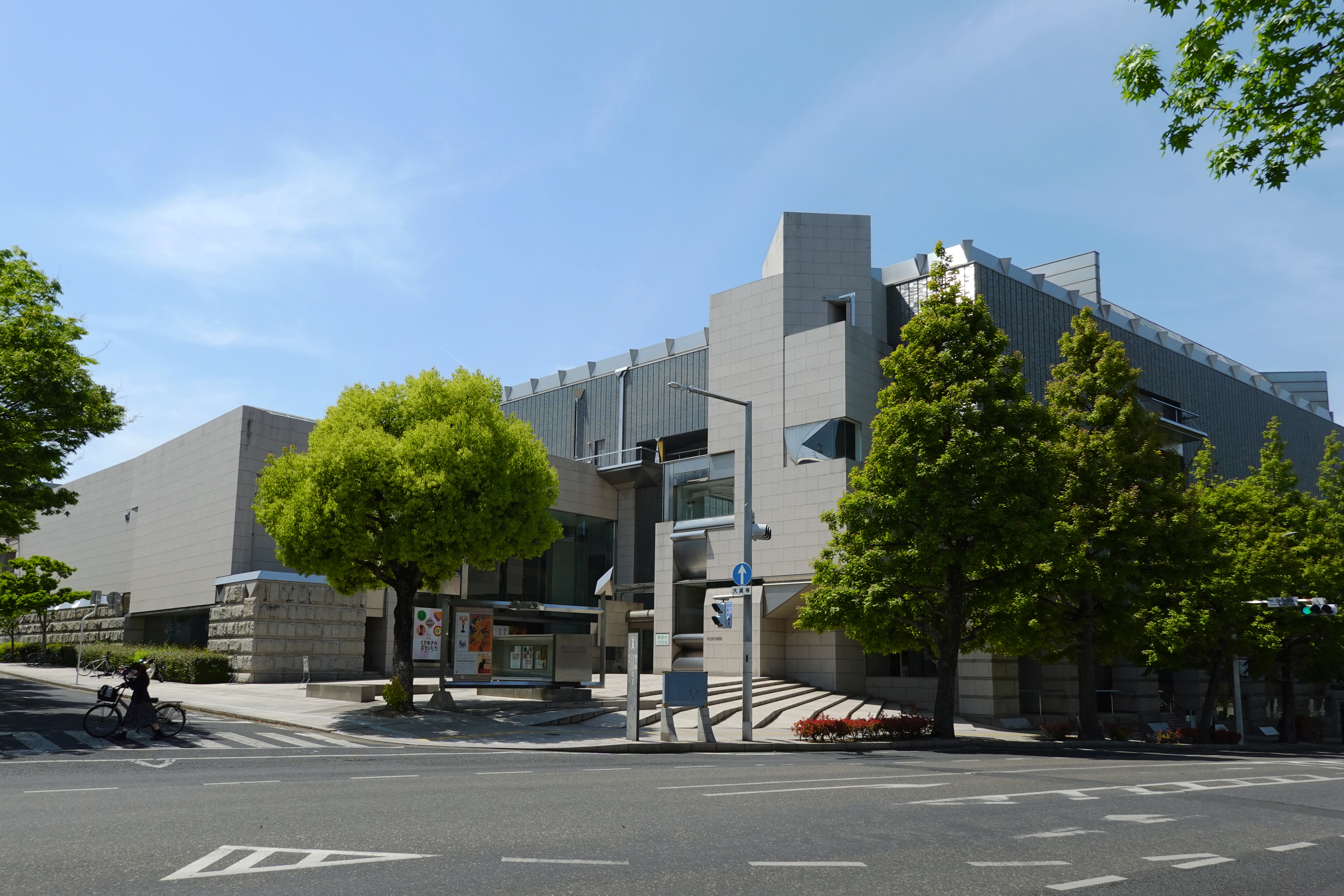
- Interactive map of the Okayama Prefectural Museum of Art 岡山県立美術館 area

General information
- Location: 8-48 Tenjin-chō, Kita-ku, Okayama, Okayama, Japan
- Coordinates: 34°40′4″N 133°55′48″E
- Opened: 18 March 1988

Design and construction
- Architecture firm: Okada & Associates

Website
- okayama-kenbi.info/en

The Okayama Prefectural Museum of Art (岡山県立美術館, Okayama Kenritsu Bijutsukan) is located in Okayama, Okayama Prefecture, Japan. It is one of Japan's many museums which are supported by a prefecture.

The museum, by architects Okada & Associates, opened in 1988 and has a collection of around two thousand works.

== See also ==
- Okayama Prefectural Museum
- Okayama Orient Museum
- Hayashibara Museum of Art
- Okayama Symphony Hall
- Kōraku-en
- Bizen City Museum of Art
- Prefectural museum
