= Moriyama-juku =

Pre-modern Japan post-station along highway

Moriyama-juku 守山宿
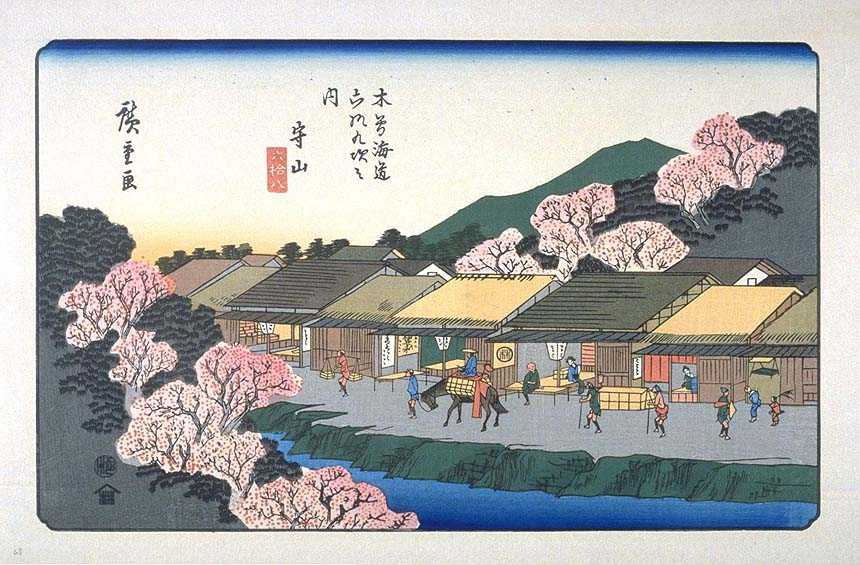
- Hiroshige's print of Moriyama-juku, part of the Sixty-nine Stations of the Kiso Kaidō series

General information
- Location: Moriyama, Shiga (former Yasu District, Ōmi Province); Japan
- Coordinates: 35°03′20.3″N 135°59′33.24″E
- Elevation: 100 m (330 ft)
- System: post station
- Line: Nakasendō
- Distance: 502 km from Edo
Location
- Location within Shiga Prefecture Location within Japan

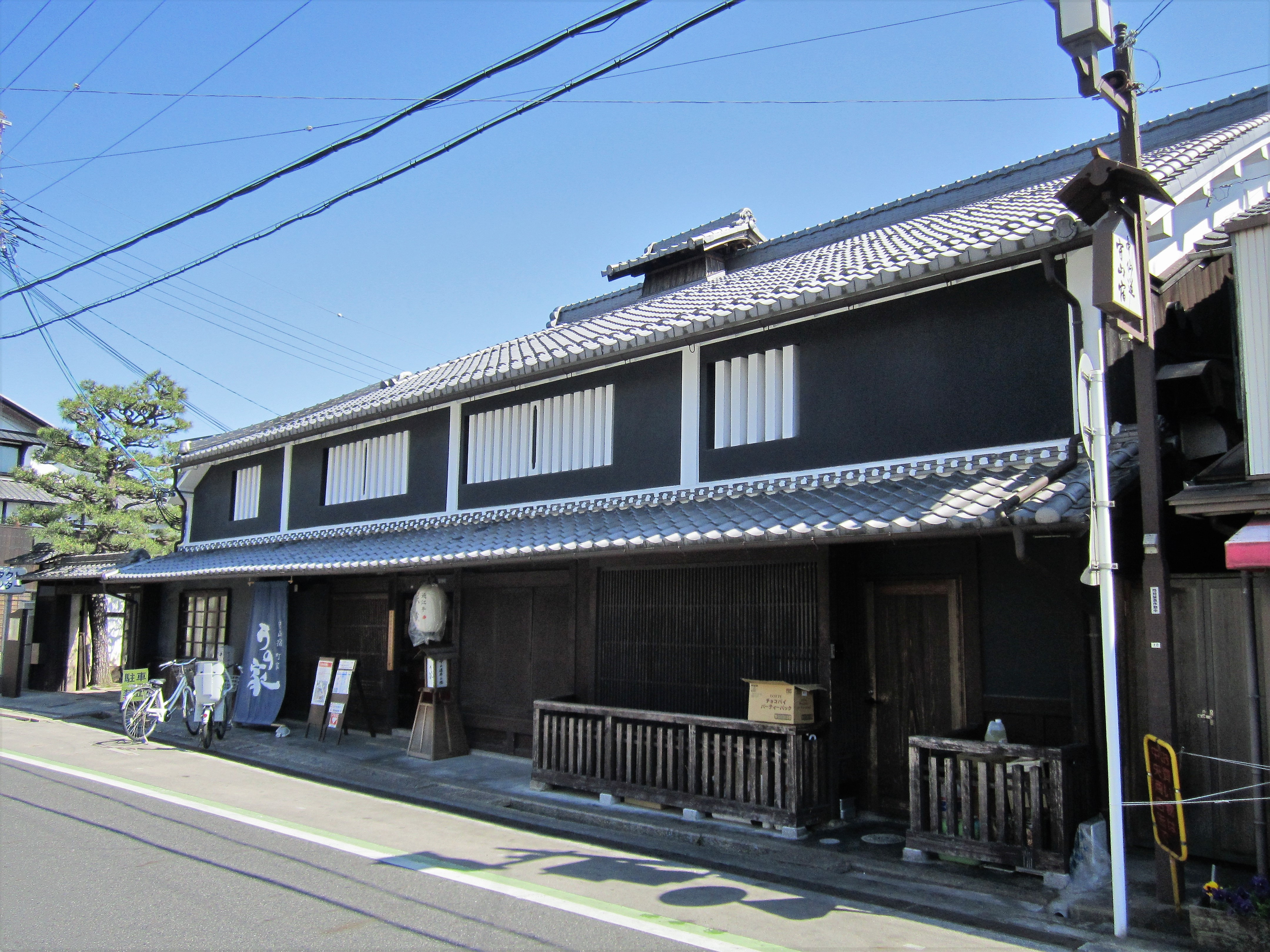
Uno house museum in Moriyama-juku

Moriyama-juku (守山宿) was the sixty-seventh of the sixty-nine stations of the Nakasendō highway connecting Edo with Kyoto in Edo period Japan. It was located in the present-day city of Moriyama, Shiga Prefecture, Japan.

== History ==
Moriyama-juku was one of the original staging points on the ancient Tōsandō highway connecting the capital of Heian-kyō with the provinces of eastern Japan from the end of the Nara period onwards. Its name means "protecting mountain", and refers to Mount Hiei which contains the temple of Enryaku-ji, the head temple of the Tendai sect. At its height, Enryaku-ji was a huge complex with over 3,000 temples and a strong army of warrior-monks. Its head abbot was usually an Imperial prince, and the temple was a powerful political force, often intervening in the politics of the court. The temple was largely destroyed by Oda Nobunaga in 1580, but was gradually rebuilt under Toyotomi Hideyoshi and the Tokugawa shogunate.

In the early Edo period, the system of post stations on the Nakasendō was formalized by the Tokugawa shogunate in 1602. Moriyama-juku was a popular stopping point for pilgrims on their way to the temple from the east. It was also on the sankin-kōtai route by the Kishū Tokugawa clan and other western daimyō to-and-from the Shogun's court in Edo.

Per the 1843 "中山道宿村大概帳" (Nakasendō Shukuson Taigaichō) guidebook issued by the Inspector of Highways (道中奉行, Dōchu-būgyō), the town had a population of 1700 in 415 houses, including two honjin, one waki-honjin, and 30 hatago. Moriyama-juku is 502 kilometers from Edo and was often the first stop on the route for travelers departing Kyoto. Many travelers preferred Moriyama-juku over Kusatsu-juku, which tended to be much more crowded as it was on a juncture of the Nakasendō with the Tōkaidō.

Between Moriyama-juku and neighboring Musa-juku was the starting point for Chōsenjin Kaidō (朝鮮人街道; "Korean Road") a branch route which ran close to the shore of Lake Biwa, bypassing the next three stations of the Nakasendō to rejoin the main route at Toriimoto-juku. It was so-named because it was the designated route for use by Korean envoys during the Joseon missions to Japan.

During the Bakumatsu period, Princess Kazu-no-miya stayed at Moriyama-juku on her way to marry Shogun Tokugawa Iemochi in Edo.

== Modern Moriyama-juku ==
Moriyama-juku forms the "old town" of modern Moriyama city, and still retains several old buildings; however the honjin was demolished in 2004. One of the surviving buildings is the Uno house, formerly a sake brewery operating from the end of the Edo period to the beginning of the Meiji era. It is also the house where former Prime Minister Sosuke Uno was born and raised.

== Moriyama-juku in The Sixty-nine Stations of the Kiso Kaidō ==
Utagawa Hiroshige's ukiyo-e print of Moriyama-juku dates from 1835 -1838. The print depicts a placid scene in the post station with several open-fronted buildings facing the Yasugawa River. Mount Mikami is shown in the background, as the setting in spring, with many sakura trees in full bloom. Each building has a different style of roof. On the right, a waitress tries to entice travelers into a tea house, but a peddler, man on a packhorse, and porters with a kago (palanquin) pass by. The middle tea house appears marginally more successful, as one person is seated on the verandah.

== Neighboring post towns ==
Nakasendō
Musa-juku - Moriyama-juku - Kusatsu-juku
