= Bizen City Museum of Art =

Museum of art in Bizen, Okayama, Japan

- 備前市美術館
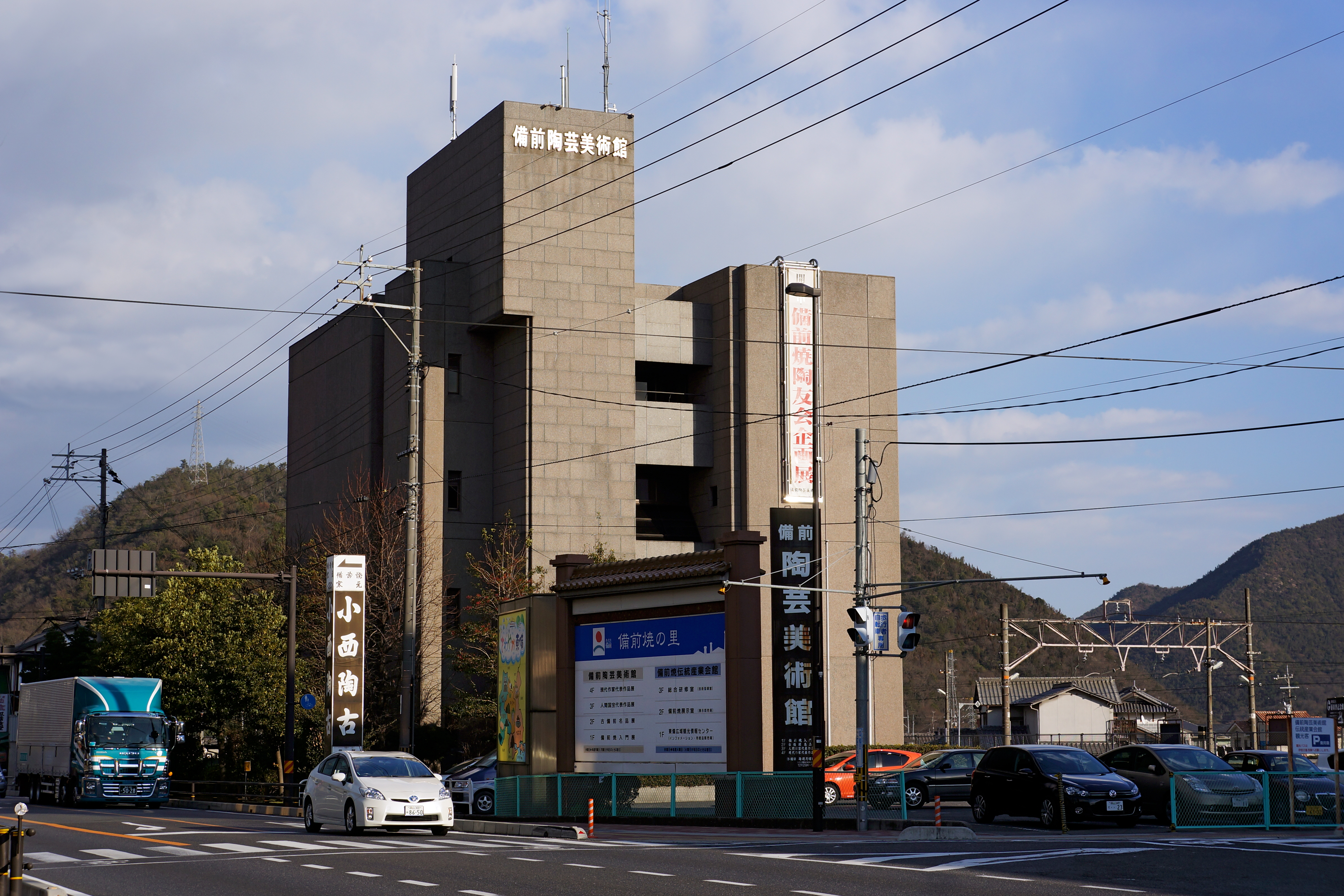
- the former museum prior to reconstruction
- Interactive map of the Bizen City Museum of Art area

General information
- Location: 1659-6 Inbe, Bizen, Okayama Prefecture, Japan
- Coordinates: 34°44′21″N 134°09′40″E
- Opened: 2025

Website
- Official website (ja)

Bizen City Museum of Art (備前市美術館, Bizen-shi Bijutsukan) is an art museum in Bizen, Okayama Prefecture, Japan. It opened on 12 July 2025, replacing the former Bizen Pottery Museum. The displays highlight contemporary ceramics, crafts, art, architecture, and design, alongside more traditional Bizen ware.

== See also ==
- Okayama Prefectural Museum of Art
- Bizen pottery kiln ruins
