= Toriimoto-juku =

Pre-modern-Japan post-station along highway

Toriimoto-juku 鳥居本宿
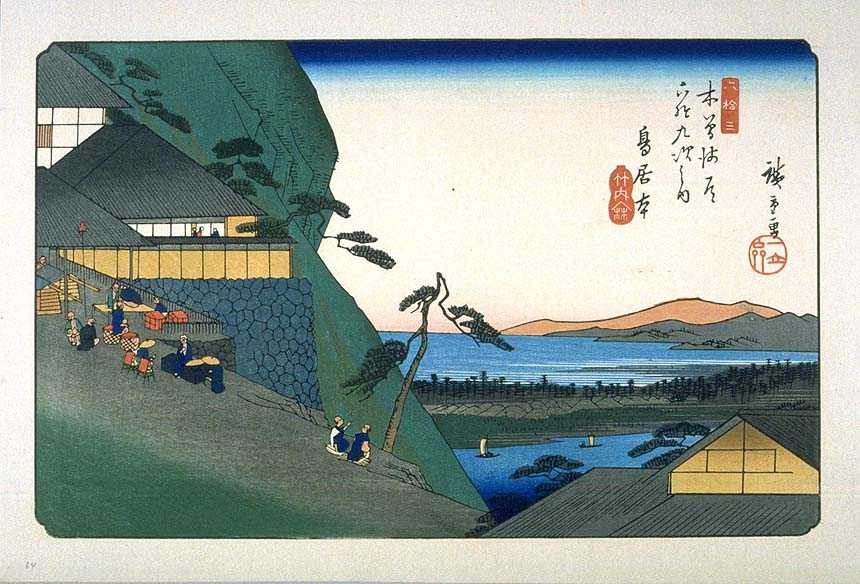
- Hiroshige's print of Toriimoto-juku, part of the Sixty-nine Stations of the Kiso Kaidō series

General information
- Location: Hikone, Shiga (former Ōmi Province); Japan
- Coordinates: 35°17′02″N 136°17′03″E
- Elevation: 105 m (344 ft)
- System: post station
- Line: Nakasendō
- Distance: 465 km from Edo
Location
- Location within Shiga Prefecture Location within Japan

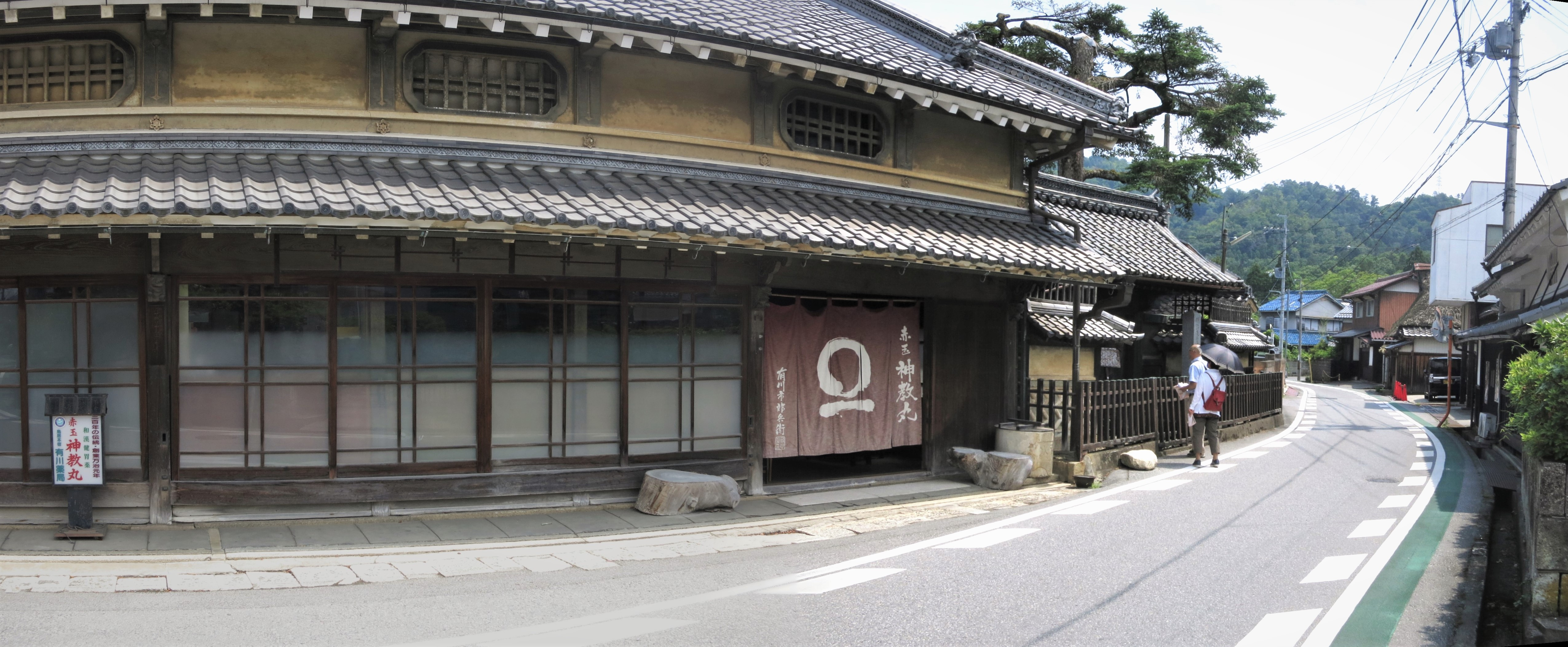
Arikawa Akadama Jinkyokan in Toriimoto-juku (ICP)

Toriimoto-juku (鳥居本宿) was the sixty-third of the sixty-nine stations of the Nakasendō highway connecting Edo with Kyoto in Edo period Japan. It was located in the present-day city of Hikone, Shiga Prefecture, Japan, overlooking Lake Biwa.

== History ==
Toriimoto-juku has a very long history, and was a market town in front of the gates of the Shinto shrine of Taga Taisha from the end of the Nara period onwards. It was located on the ancient Tōsandō highway connecting the capital of Heian-kyō with the provinces of eastern Japan and from the early Sengoku period was a popular stopping point for pilgrims. In the early Edo period, the system of post stations on the Nakasendō was formalized by the Tokugawa shogunate in 1602, and it was a stopping place for traveling merchants (Ōmi shōnin (近江商人)) who originated from Ōmi Province. A noted local speciality was an herbal stomach medicine called Akadama Shinkyo-gan (赤玉神教丸), which was effective against diarrhea and food poisoning. The medicine continued to be made today by the Arikawa Seiyaku Corporation in modern Toriimoto. Another traditional local speciality of Toriimoto-juku was the kappa, or straw raincoat, used by travelers on the highway. Stores selling kappa advertised with wooden kappa-shaped signboards.

Toriimoto-juku was also the location where the Chōsenjin Kaidō (朝鮮人街道; "Korean Road") branched off the Nakasendō. This sub-route was originally constructed by Oda Nobunaga to reach Azuchi Castle and ran close to the shore of Lake Biwa, bypassing three stations of the Nakasendō to rejoin the main route at Yasu village (between Musa-juku and Moriyama-juku). It was so-named because it was the designated route for use by Korean envoys during the Joseon missions to Japan.

It was also on the sankin-kōtai route to-and-from the Shogun's court in Edo and was the favored stopping place for Kii Domain, Hiroshima Domain, Kurume Domain, Tokushima Domain, Matsue Domain, Hagi Domain, Tsuyama Domain and the Iyo-Matsuyama Domain. Per records kept by the Teramura family who owned the honjin, the number of guests for typical daimyō procession could be as many as 200 to 300 people, although come were much smaller. Between 1829 and 1841, the honjin recorded a total of 161 processions with a total of 3,594 individuals.

Per an 1843 the "中山道宿村大概帳" (Nakasendō Shukuson Taigaichō) guidebook issued by the Inspector of Highways (道中奉行, Dōchu-būgyō), the town had a population of 1448 people in 293 houses, including one honjin, two waki-honjin, and 35 hatago, and was thus this largest of the stations in Ōmi Province. Toriimot-juku is 465 kilometers from Edo and 55 kilometers from Kyoto.

== Modern Toriimoto-juku ==
Even today, there are remnants of the former post town around. If you enter from the north, you pass by a pine colonnade that leads to the still-standing buildings with a lattice structures on sleeve walls that extends for about 2 kilometer.

The two teahouses depicted in the Hiroshige print no longer exist, with Rinkodo burning to the ground in 1991. But the town has several old buildings, warehouses, inns and shops dating from 19th century. One of these buildings is the famous pharmacy Akadama-Jinkyokan where herbal medicines against several types of illness are prepared since the 17th century. The complex of buildings is known as at the Arikawa family residence, and five of its structures are protected as Important Cultural Properties.

== Toriimoto-juku in The Sixty-nine Stations of the Kiso Kaidō ==
Utagawa Hiroshige's ukiyo-e print of Toriimoto-juku dates from 1835 -1838. The print depicts the portion of the Nakasendō between Tanba-juku and Toriimoto-juku where the road goes through the Surihachi-toge Pass. There were two teahouses in the pass, the Bokodo (depicted on the left) and the Rinkodo (depicted on the right). These teahouses had good views overlooking Lake Biwa and were considered suitable for high-ranking travelers, as indicated by the kago (palanquin) depicted in front of the Bokodo, which is supported by a massive stone foundation, similar to that of a castle. Porters are resting outside while presumably their customers are inside. In the distance, a fishing village and pine trees can be seen on the shore of Lake Biwa, with the island of Chikubushima in the distance. The composition was plagiarized by Hiroshige from an illustrated guide to the Nakasendō called the "Kisoji Meisho Zue", published in 1805.

== Neighboring post towns ==
Nakasendō
Banba-juku - Toriimoto-juku - Takamiya-juku
