= Musa-juku =

Pre-modern Japan post-station along highway

Musa-juku 武佐宿
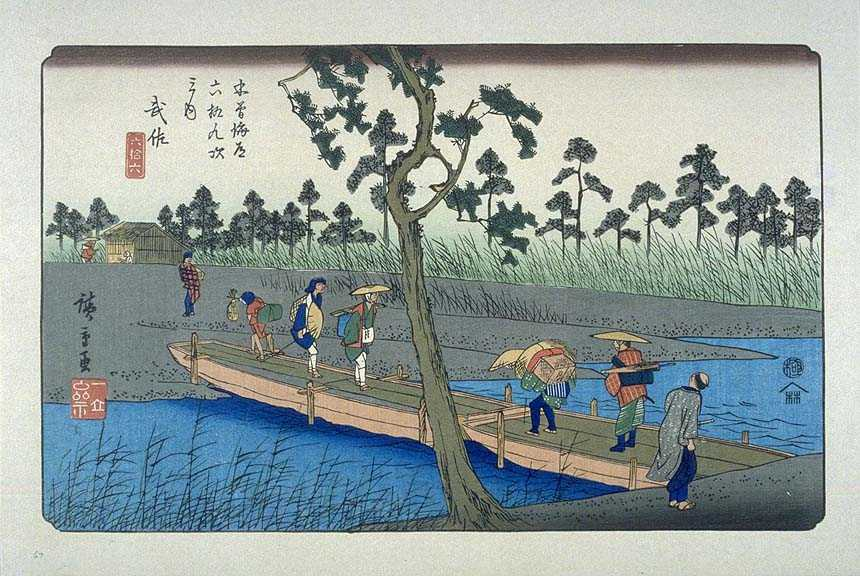
- Hiroshige's print of Musa-shuku, part of the Sixty-nine Stations of the Kiso Kaidō series

General information
- Location: Ōmihachiman, Shiga (former Ōmi Province); Japan
- Coordinates: 35°07′00.1″N 136°08′04.2″E
- System: post station
- Line: Nakasendō
- Distance: 488.1 km from Edo
Location
- Location within Shiga Prefecture Location within Japan

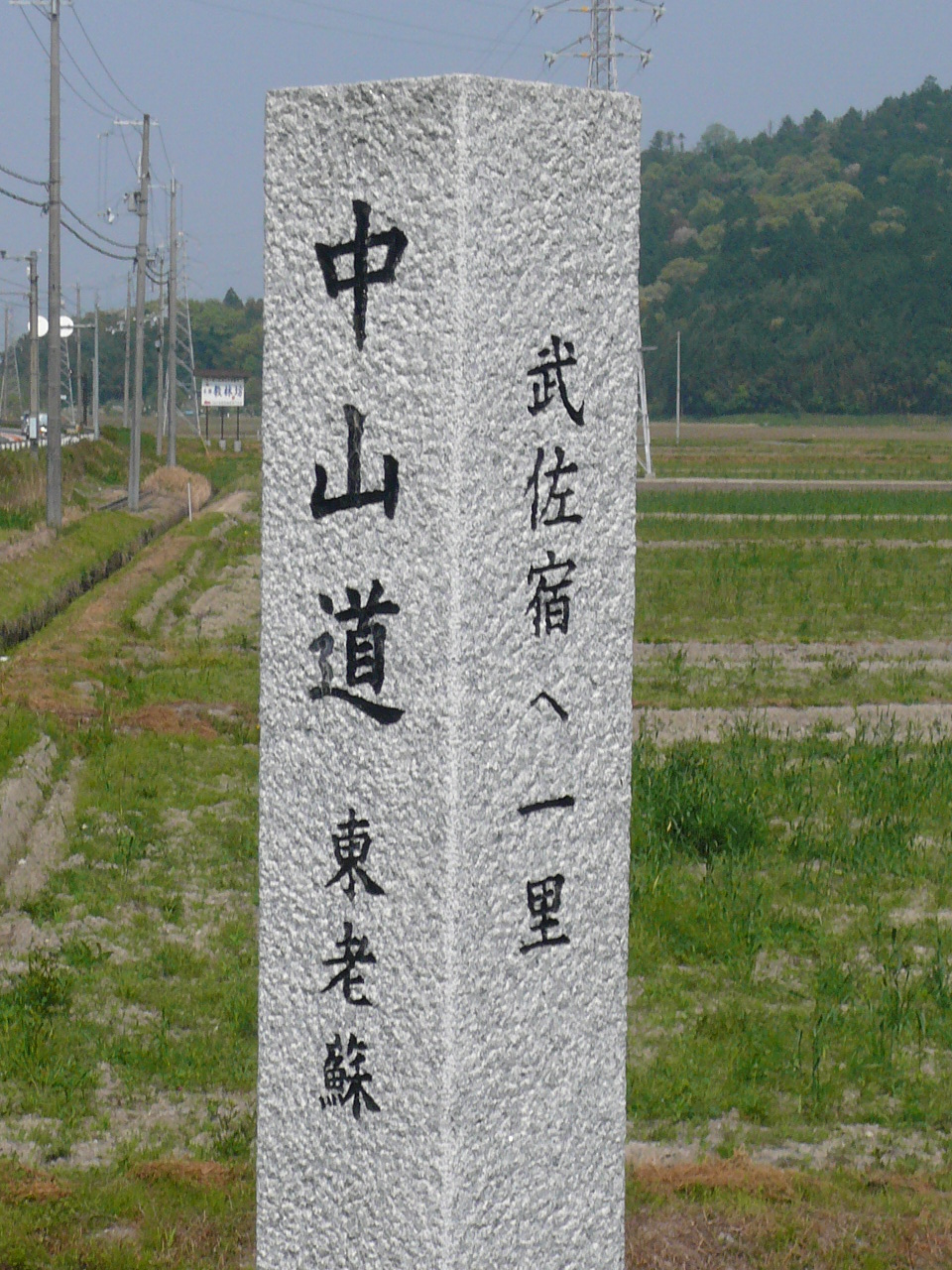
A marker giving the distance to Musa-juku

Musa-juku (武佐宿) was the sixty-sixth of the sixty-nine stations of the Nakasendō highway connecting Edo with Kyoto in Edo period Japan. It was located in the present-day city of Ōmihachiman, Shiga Prefecture, Japan. Other kanji used to write "Musa" included 牟佐 and 身狭, but 武佐 became the official kanji in the Edo period.

== History ==
Musa-juku was one of the original staging points on the ancient Tōsandō highway connecting the capital of Heian-kyō with the provinces of eastern Japan from the end of the Nara period onwards. During the Sengoku period, the nearby jōkamachi of Ōmihachiman was developed by Toyotomi Hidetsugu, and many traveling merchants (Ōmi shōnin (近江商人)) relocated to this area from the ruins of Azuchi Castle. A road from Musa-juku extended towards Ise Province via Eigen-ji temple and the town of Yōkaichi, which was used by the Ōmi shōnin for transport of seafood, paper and cloth. The speciality product of Musa-juku was the Musa-masu, (also known as the Ōmi-masu) a square wooden of fixed dimensions traditionally used to measure rice. However, this product fell out of favor when Toyotomi Hideyoshi unified the country's measurement system on the Kyō-masu which was used in Kyoto. Another local speciality was Inkstick made from bamboo ashes.

In the early Edo period, the system of post stations on the Nakasendō was formalized by the Tokugawa shogunate in 1602. Musa-juku was on the sankin-kōtai route by the Kishū Tokugawa clan and other western daimyō en route to-and-from the Shogun's court in Edo; however, due to its proximity to the much-larger Otsu-juku and the fact that it was not on the marginally shorter Chōsenjin Kaidō (朝鮮人街道; "Korean Road") which ran closer to the shore of Lake Biwa, bypassing three stations of the Nakasendō including Musa-juku, meant that it attracted less traffic. The area around Musa-juku was prosperous, with fertile, well-watered soil, and the area was noted for its production of rice, hemp and linen.

Per an 1843 the "中山道宿村大概帳" (Nakasendō Shukuson Taigaichō) guidebook issued by the Inspector of Highways (道中奉行, Dōchu-būgyō), the town had a population of 537 in 183 houses, including one honjin, one waki-honjin, and 23 hatago. Musa-juku is 488.1 kilometers from Edo.

== Modern Musa-juku ==
Following the Meiji restoration and the construction of the Tōkaidō Main Line railway, Musa-juku fell into rapid decline, since a railway station was not constructed in the vicinity. As a result, a number of buildings are well-preserved; however, the Nakamura-ya hatago, built over 200 years ago, was destroyed in a fire in 2010.

== Musa-juku in The Sixty-nine Stations of the Kiso Kaidō ==
Utagawa Hiroshige's ukiyo-e print of Musa-juku dates from 1835 -1838. The print depicts travelers crossing a pontoon bridge across the Hinogawa River rather than the post station itself. The area around Musa-juku was flat, but travelers had to cross a number of rivers. In the print, a samurai waits on the river bank while a man with a heavy burden and a traveller in a plaid jacket are crossing, while two pilgrims are crossing from the opposite side. A women, her lower legs exposed is hurrying after a man on the far bank. A small building, possibly a tea house, is on the far bank in the distance, and a seated figure can be seen in silhouette.

== Neighboring post towns ==
Nakasendō
Echigawa-juku - Musa-juku - Moriyama-juku
