= Seiken-ji =

Buddhist temple in Shizuoka, Japan

- 清見寺
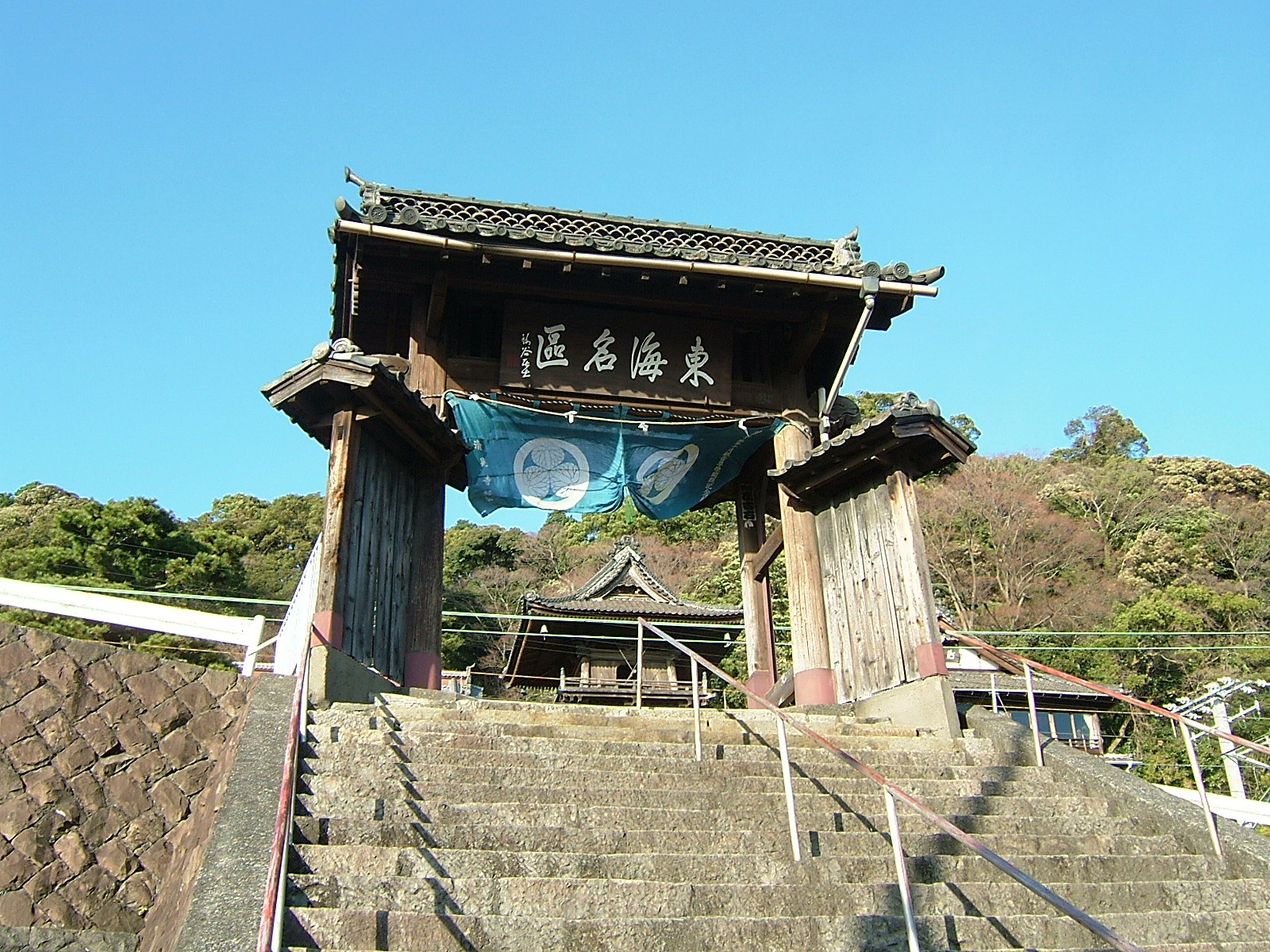
- Seiken-ji gate

- Seiken-ji Seiken-ji (Japan)

Religion
- Affiliation: Buddhism
- Deity: Shaka Nyōrai
- Rite: Rinzai school

Location
- Location: 418-1 Seikenji-cho, Shimizu-ku, Shizuoka-shi, Shizuoka-ken
- Country: Japan
- Coordinates: 35°2′51.45″N 138°30′47.15″E

Architecture
- Founder: unknown
- Completed: c. Nara period

Website
- seikenji.com

Seiken-ji (清見寺), is a Buddhist temple belonging to the Myōshin-ji branch of the Rinzai school of Japanese Zen, located in the Okitsu neighborhood of Shimizu-ku ward of the city of Shizuoka, Shizuoka, Japan. Its main image is a statue of Shaka Nyōrai. It is also called Kiyomi-dera.

== History ==
The temple claims to have been founded in the Hakuchi era of the Nara period as a Tendai sect temple to protect the Kiyomi-seki (清見関), a natural barrier on the ancient Tōkaidō highway connecting the capital with eastern Japan, where the path of the road was a narrow ledge between cliffs and the Pacific Ocean. The temple subsequently fell into disrepair and was revived and converted to the Rinzai school by the monk Enni in 1262 AD. The temple flourished during the Muromachi period and was named one of the Jissetsu temples in 1343. It is where Ashikaga Takauji and Imagawa Yoshimoto took the tonsure. In the Sengoku period, when the young Tokugawa Ieyasu was held hostage in Sunpu by the Imagawa clan, he was sent to Seiken-ji to be tutored by the abbot Sessai Chōrō. During the invasion of Suruga Province by the Takeda clan, Imagawa Ujizane established his headquarters at this temple.

During the Edo period, the temple continued to flourish due to its connection with Tokugawa Ieyasu, and its location on the Tōkaidō highway linking Edo with Kyoto. It was selected by the Tokugawa shogunate as one of the lodging spots for the Joseon missions to Japan and the delegations from the Ryukyu Kingdom. Due to these connections it was designated a National Historic Site of Japan in 1994. Surviving Edo period structures include the Sanmon (1651) and entrance to the Main Hall (1616).

During the early Meiji period, the tracks of the Tōkaidō Main Line railway were laid across the front of the temple, which lost much of its properties. However, due to its scenic location overlooking Suruga Bay, the temple drew the attention of poets and writers, including Shimazaki Tōson, Takayama Chogyū and Natsume Sōseki.

The temple was also the location of an important conference held by the leadership of the fledgling Imperial Japanese Navy in June 1887, with the participants discussing various tactics and fleet maneuvers, which would then be tested in practice by the fleet in nearby Shimizu harbor.

== Cultural properties ==
=== National Important Cultural Properties ===
==== Diary of Ye Mengde ====
Diary of Ye Mengde (Chinese: 葉夢得; Wade–Giles: Yeh Meng-te; 1077–1148), a Song dynasty Chinese scholar, poet, and government minister, dated summer of 1149 AD

=== National Place of Scenic Beauty ===
==== Seiken-ji gardens ====
The Japanese garden at Seiken-ji dates from the early Edo period and contains ponds and tree arrangements. It became a nationally designated Place of Scenic Beauty in 1936.

== Gallery ==
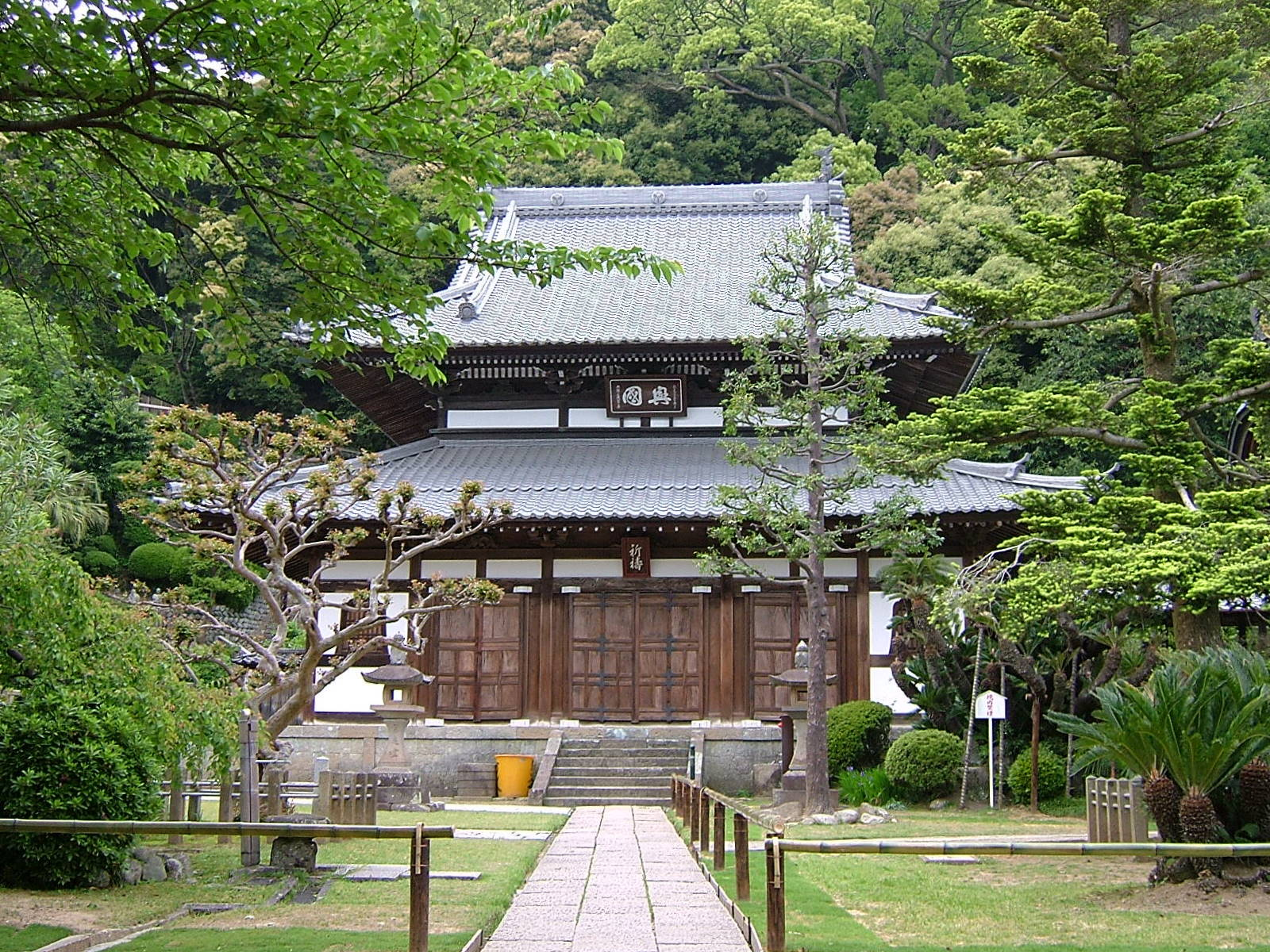
Butsuden

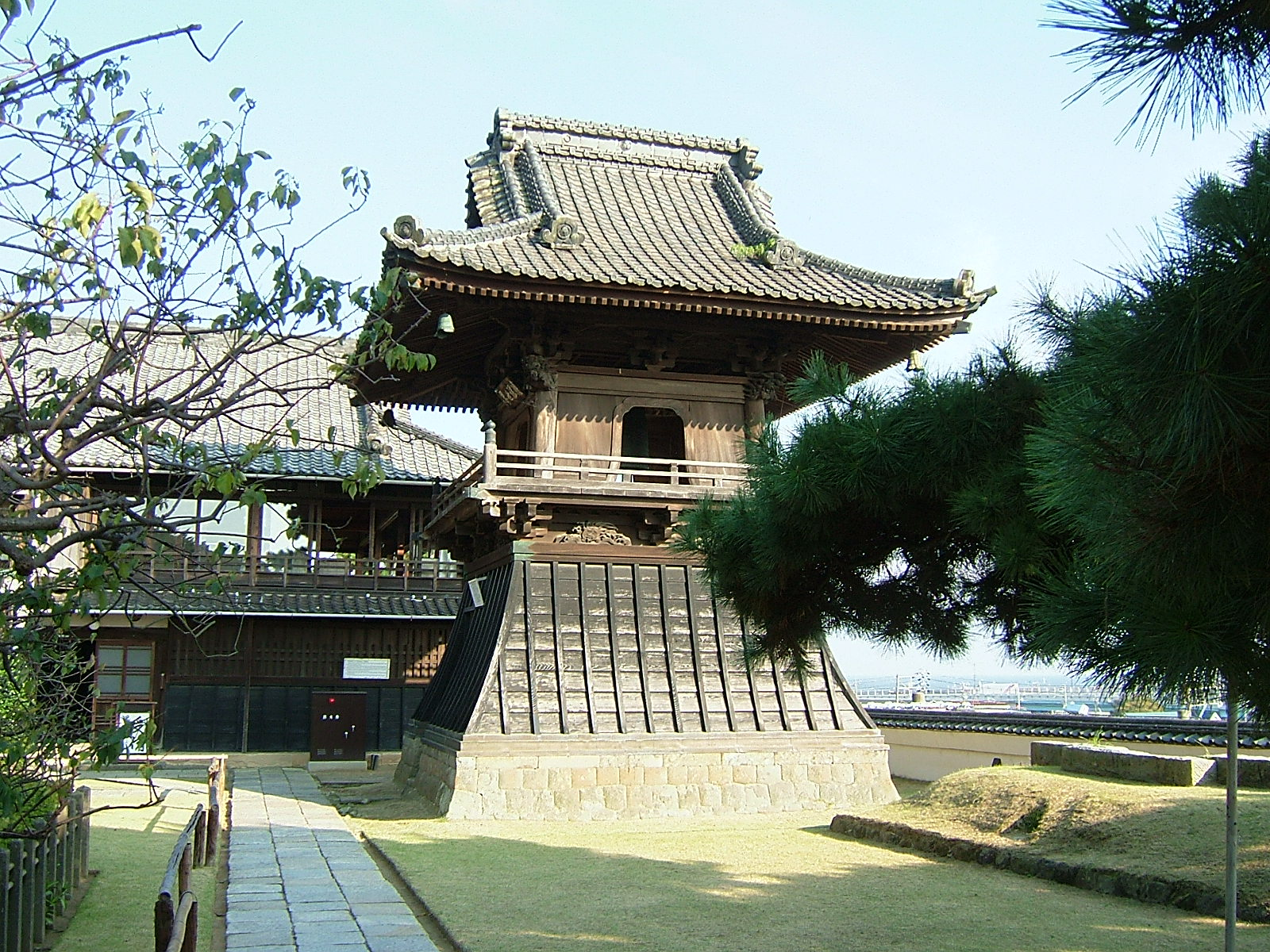
Belfry

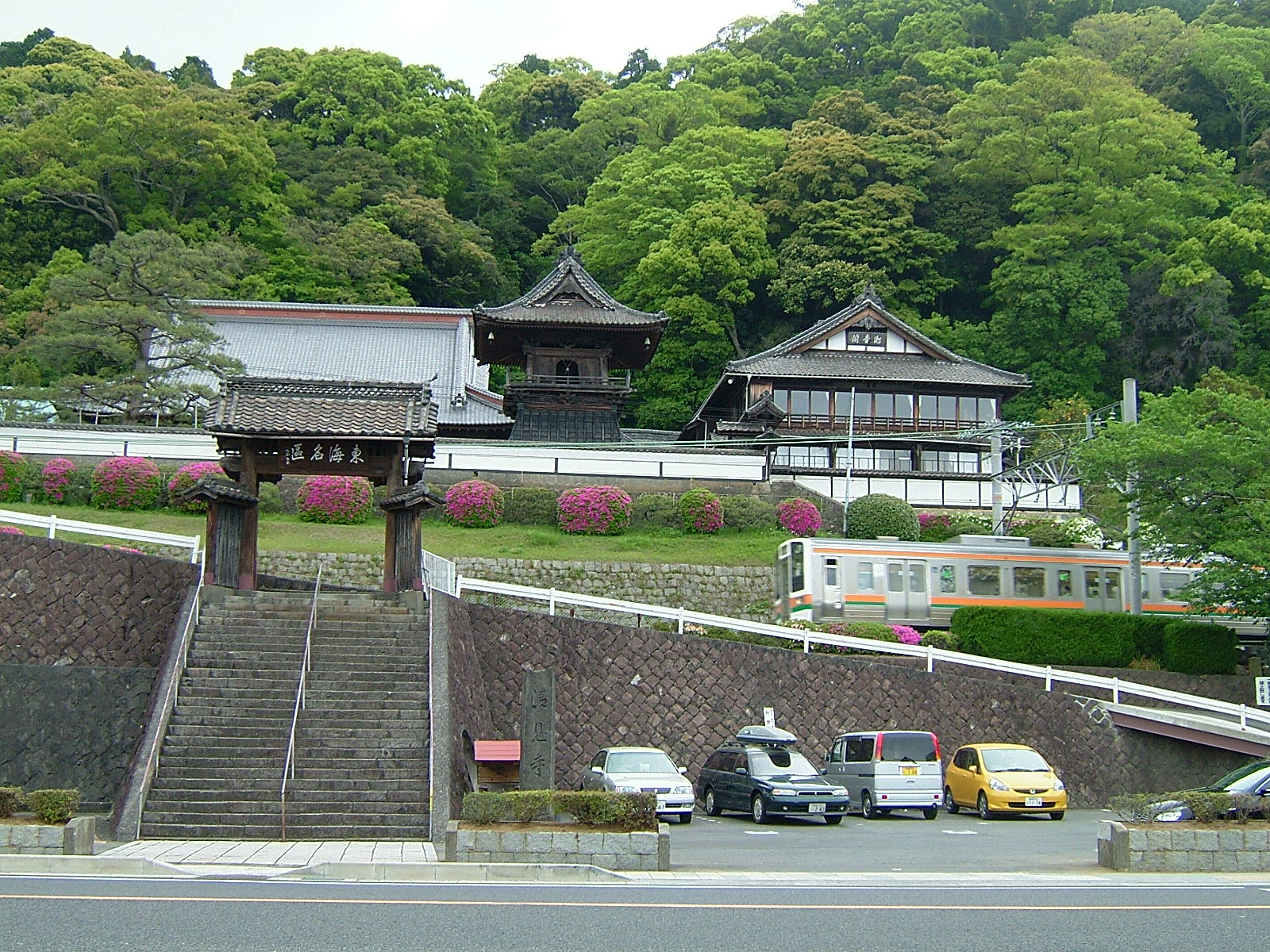
Seiken-ji from Tōkaidō Line tracks

== See also ==
- List of Historic Sites of Japan (Shizuoka)
- List of Places of Scenic Beauty of Japan (Shizuoka)
