= Chōsenjin Kaidō =

Travel route during the Edo period in Ōmi Province, Japan

The Chōsenjin Kaidō (朝鮮人街道, "Korean People Road") was a travel route during the Edo period in Ōmi Province, Japan. It received its name because it was used about 12 times by representatives of the Joseon (朝鮮) Dynasty in modern-day Korea during the Joseon missions to Japan. It was also called the Hikone Road (彦根道 Hikone-michi), the Kyō Road (京道 Kyō-michi) and the Hachiman Road (八幡道 Hachiman-michi).

It was originally built by Oda Nobunaga to join Azuchi Castle to Kyoto. After the Battle of Sekigahara, Tokugawa Ieyasu used it for going to Kyoto, so it was considered an auspicious road. It served as a sub-route of the Nakasendō, connecting Toriimoto-juku with Yasu village (between Musa-juku and Moriyama-juku). At 41 km (25 mi), the route only skipped over three other post stations. Staying closer to Lake Biwa, the route went through the present day municipalities of Hikone, Azuchi, Ōmihachiman and Yasu in Shiga Prefecture.

Joseon representatives had luncheon at Omihachiman and stayed at Hikone. They left traces of their stay, such as handwritten documents and portraits, at the temples in Omihachiman and Hikone.
