= Okayama Prefectural Museum =

Museum in Japan

- 岡山県立博物館
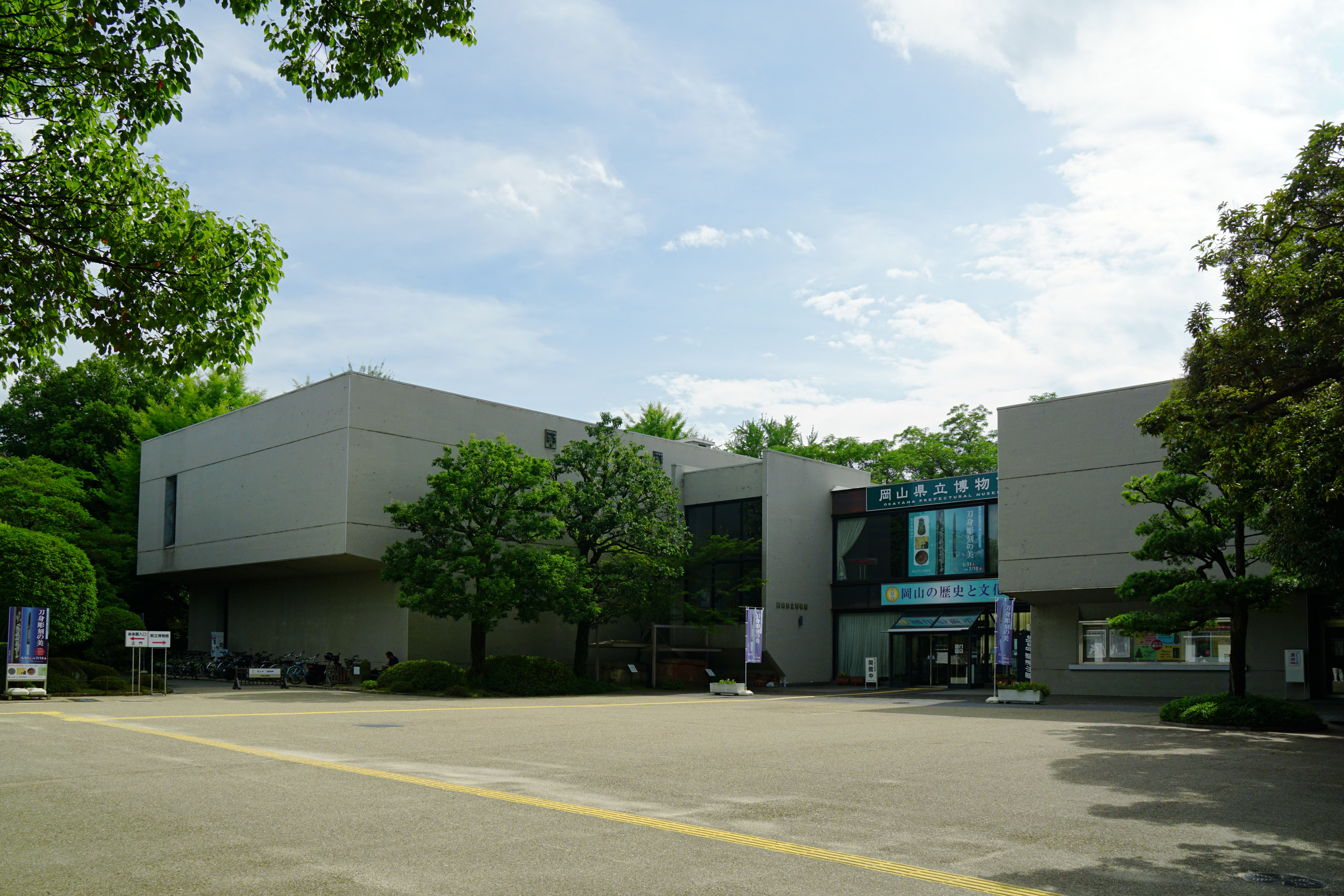
- Okayama Prefectural Museum, July 2016
- Established: August 1971
- Location: 1-5 Korakuen, Kita-ku, Okayama-shi, Okayama, Japan
- Coordinates: 34°40′6″N 133°56′2″E

Okayama Prefectural Museum (岡山県立博物館, Okayama kenritsu hakubutsukan) is a museum in Kita-ku, Okayama, Japan. It was built to house important artifacts from the prefecture dating from prehistory through modern times.

== Notable exhibits ==
The museum houses one National Treasure, red-laced yoroi armor from the 12th century. Although documents about red-dyed armor lacing exist, the museum's armor is the only known example of this type of armor.

The museums also houses two important tachi swords, one a National Important Cultural Property and the other an Important Cultural Property of Okayama Prefecture.

== See also ==
- Prefectural museum
