= Hayashibara Museum of Art =

Art museum in Japan

Coordinates: 34°39′49″N 133°56′00″E

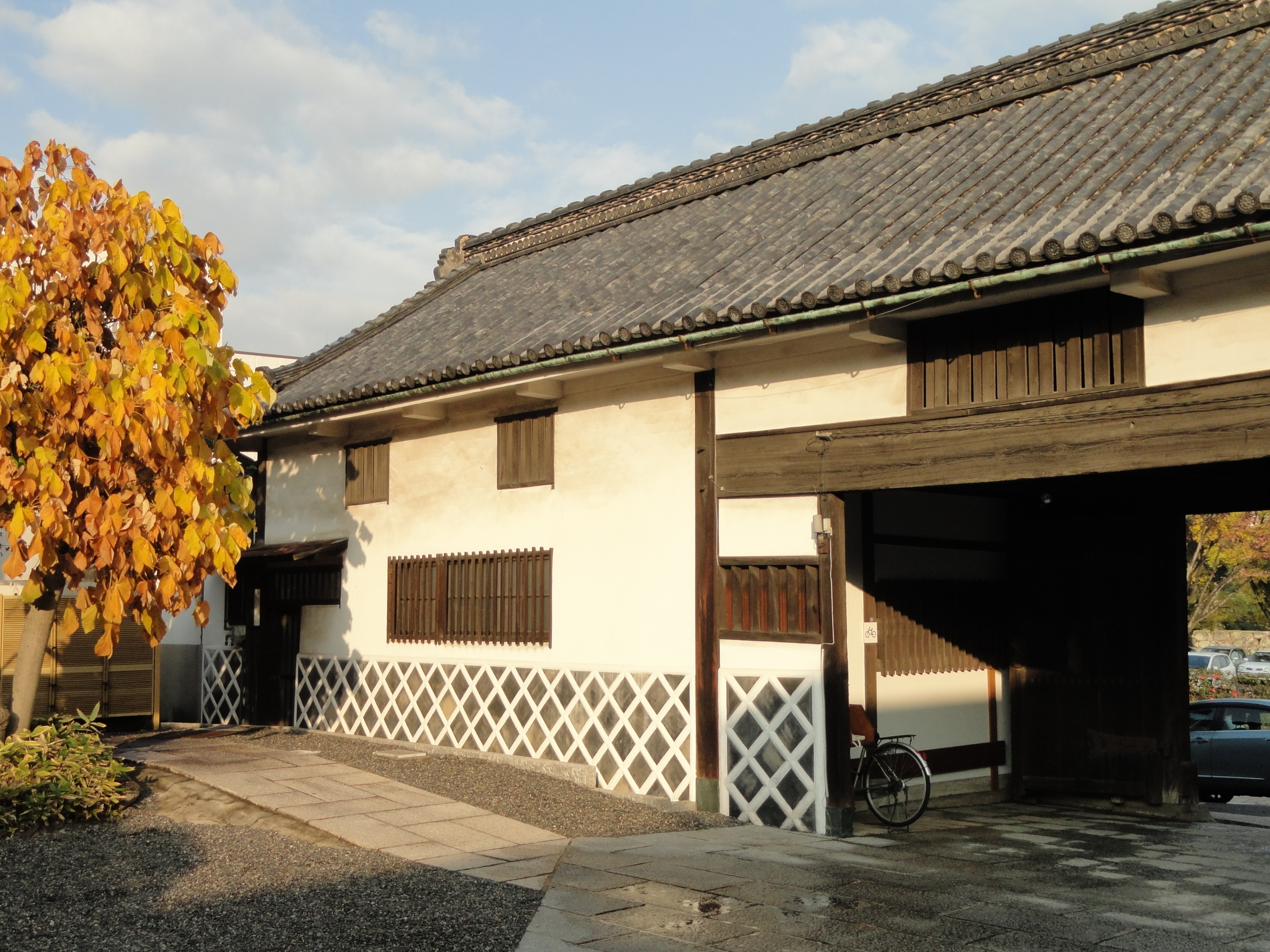
Hayashibara Museum of Art gateway

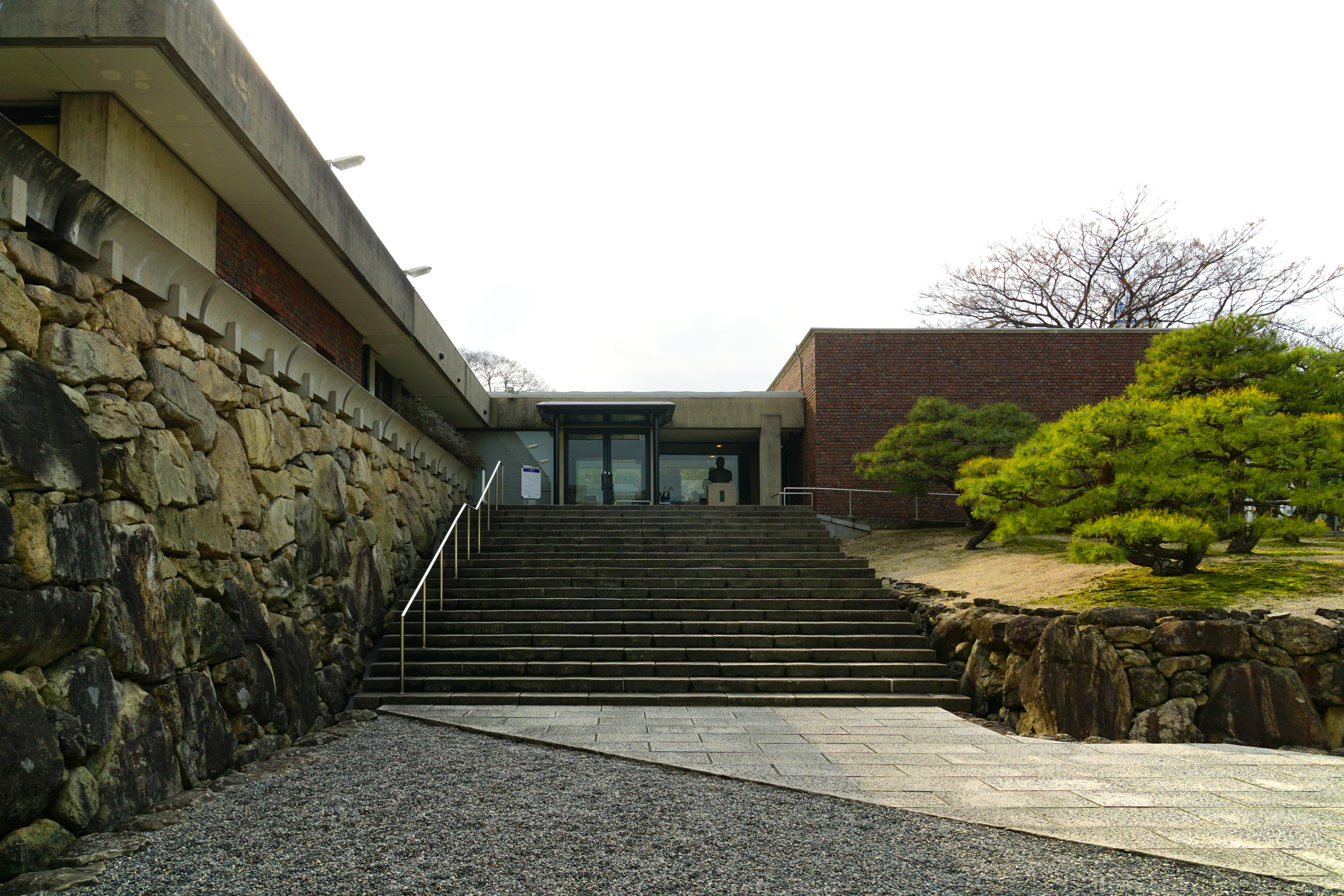
Main Hall

The Hayashibara Museum of Art (林原美術館, Hayashibara Bijutsukan) is an art museum owned by the Hayashibara Group, and located at 2-7-15 Marunouchi, Kita-ku, Okayama, Japan. It is on the site of a former guesthouse beside the inner moat of Okayama Castle. Its 6,832 square meter interior was designed by Kunio Maekawa.

The owner of the collection was Ichiro Hayashibara, and the museum was opened in 1964, to honor his final wishes to display his collection to the public after his death. The museum owns approximately 10,000 artifacts from Hayashibara's personal collection, including swords, armor, and pottery collected by Mr. Hayashibara, and Noh costumes, furniture, paintings, and Japanese lacquer from the Ikeda clan. The museum itself has limited space, so exhibits are rotated four to five times per year.

== Collection ==
The museum houses 26 Important Cultural Properties and three National Treasures, including the 14th century indigo Dō-Maru samurai armor used by high-ranking samurai. Many of the Bizen swords and pottery are also National Treasures.
