= List of urban rail systems in Japan =

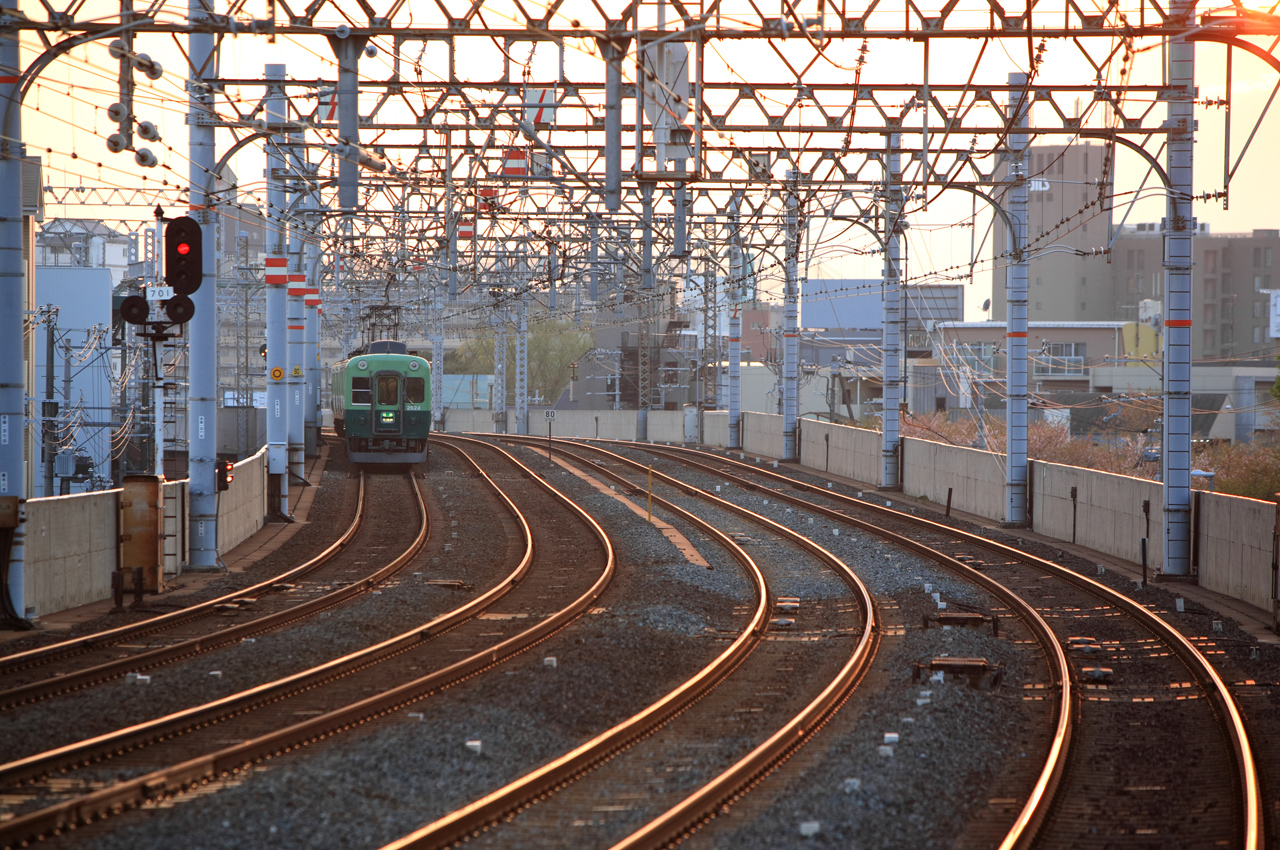
The 12.5 km quadruple-track section of the Keihan Main Line between Tenmabashi and the Neyagawa Signal Box is branded entirely as the "Keihan Main Line", and is counted only once in this list.

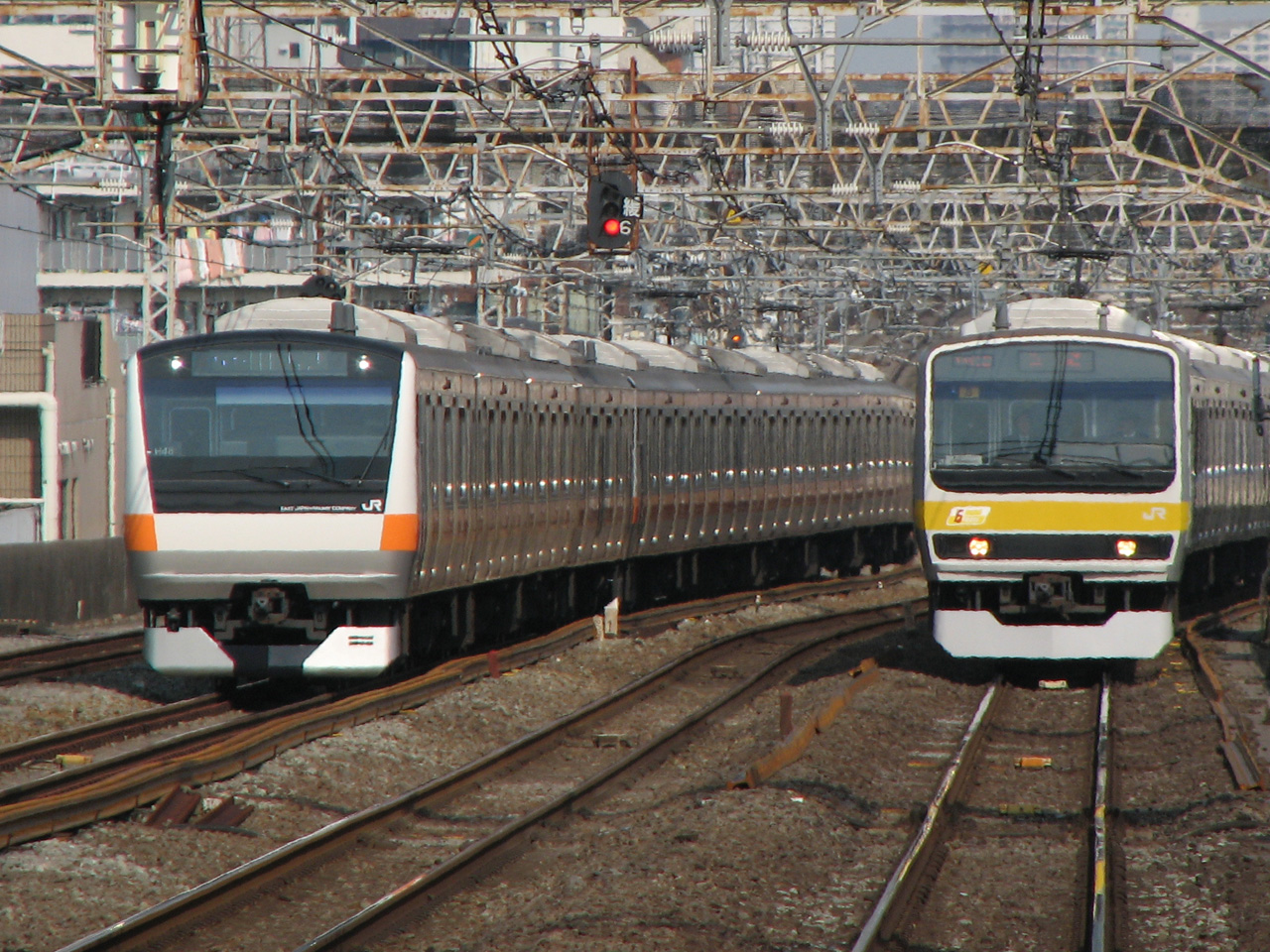
East of Mitaka, rapid and local services on the Chūō Main Line in the Greater Tokyo Area are segregated from each other, with each provided a dedicated pair of tracks and distinctive branding (orange for the rapid services and yellow for the local services).

The list of urban rail systems in Japan lists urban rail transit systems in Japan, organized by metropolitan area (都市圏), including number of stations, length (km), and average daily and annual ridership volume. Data is shown only for those areas designated as major metropolitan areas (大都市圏) by the Statistics Bureau of the Ministry of Internal Affairs and Communications.

== Considerations ==
There are several considerations for the data presented in this list.

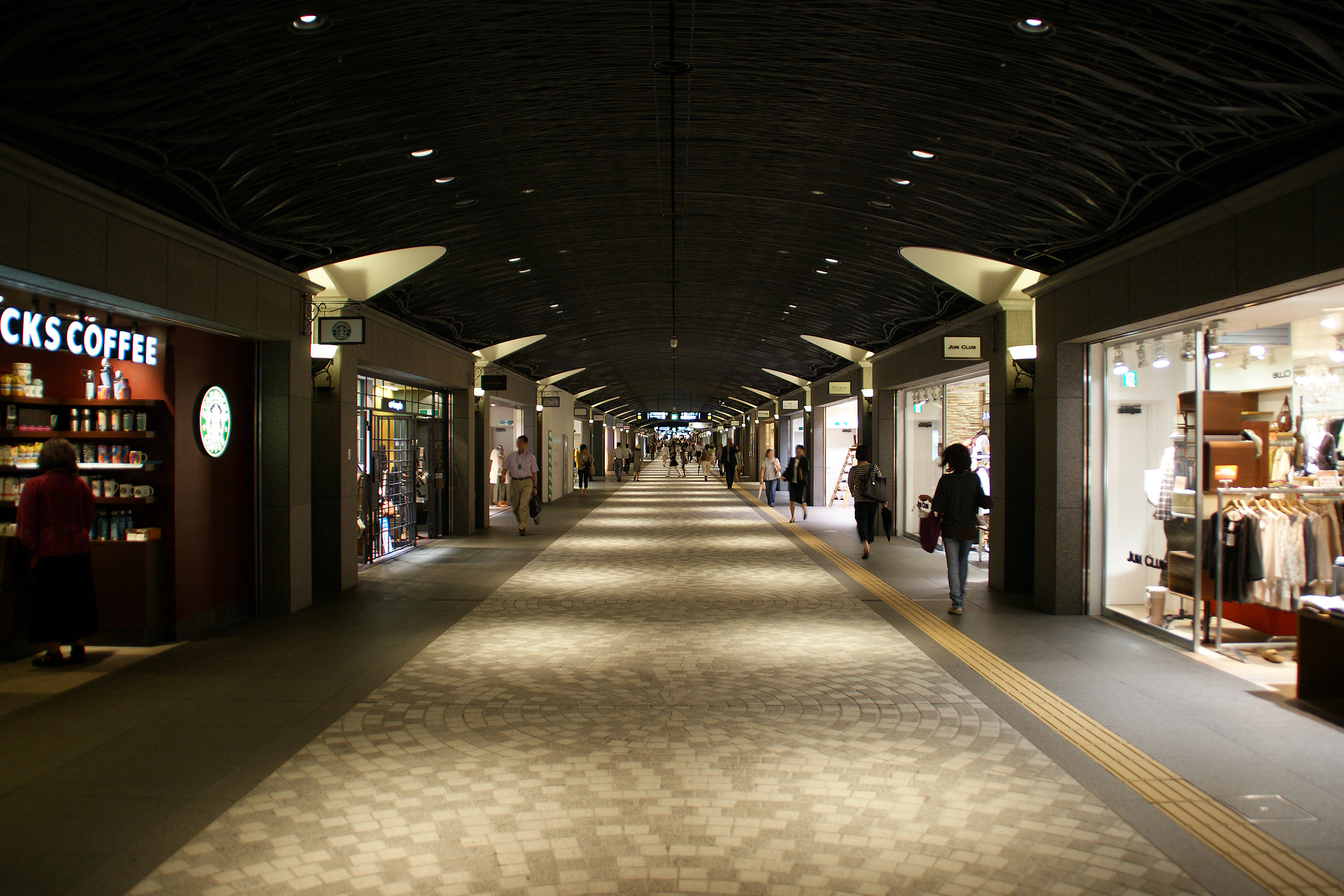
The Tenjin Underground Mall connects Tenjin and Tenjin-Minami on the Fukuoka City Subway. Together, these two stations are considered an interchange station, but because they are given distinct station names, they are counted as separate stations in this list.

=== Station count ===
Data is broken down at the line level, then rolled up for each specific railway operator. The total station count for each operator is a "unique station" count—an interchange or transfer station between two lines operated by the same company is counted as a single station. As a result, summing together the station counts for all of the lines under a single railway operator will generally yield a value greater than the total station count cited for the operator.

Some station pairs are officially considered interchanges by their respective railway operators despite having different names (e.g., Tameike-Sannō and Kokkai-gijidō-mae on the Tokyo Metro and Tenjin and Tenjin-Minami on the Fukuoka City Subway). As such stations have different names, however, they are counted as separate stations in this list.

=== Length ===
In a similar fashion to the station count, length is counted as route kilometers, but only considers "unique" segments. The following considerations are relevant for the lengths referenced in the tables.

==== Intra-company considerations ====
Generally, multiple-track sections classified under the same line name and without operational segregation into separate lines are only counted once, not twice. Examples include the quadruple-track sections of the Keihan Main Line and Tōbu Isesaki Line, which are only counted once because fast (i.e., limited-stop) and slow (i.e., local or all-stop) services are branded together as a single line, not separately as distinct lines.

Other cases include double junctions where a double-track branch line ties into a double-track main line, permitting interlining of the branch line with the main line. Examples include Keiō Sagamihara Line trains that continue past Chōfu Station onto the Keiō Line. In this situation, the trackage of the Keiō Sagamihara Line is counted as only the section between Chōfu and Hashimoto Station, while the double-track section east of Chōfu is counted under the Keiō Line, following traditional conventions for railway line nomenclature in Japan.

Likewise, double-track segments shared by lines under the same operator are only counted once. Examples include the Yamanote Freight Line between Ikebukuro and Ōsaki, a segment shared by the Saikyō Line and Shōnan-Shinjuku Line. In this situation, the trackage is counted only once, under the Saikyō Line. Similarly, tabulations for the larger tram systems with a high degree of interlining, such as Hiroshima Electric Railway, also consider only unique segments, and sections where multiple routes overlap are only counted once.

However, if there is some reasonable segregation of operations or distinction between lines, the trackage is counted more than once. Examples include the various quadruple-track sections of East Japan Railway Company (JR East) that provide segregated local and rapid services (e.g., Chūō Rapid Line vs. Chūō-Sōbu Line). Here, the route-kilometers are counted twice, once under the Chūō Rapid Line and again under the local Chūō-Sōbu Line.

Other situations include quadruple-track sections at the confluence of two distinct double-track lines, such as the Ōsaka Uehommachi – Fuse quadruple-track section of the Kintetsu network in central Ōsaka, officially designated as part of the Osaka Line but actually two lines (the Osaka Line and Nara Line) sharing a single right-of-way west of Fuse. A similar situation applies for many JR East lines—the Yamanote Line and Keihin-Tōhoku Line officially use tracks classified as part of the Tōkaidō Main Line and Tōhoku Main Line, but that are fully segregated from the tracks used by the respective services operating under the names "Tōkaidō Line" and "Utsunomiya Line" / "Takasaki Line".

==== Cross-company considerations ====
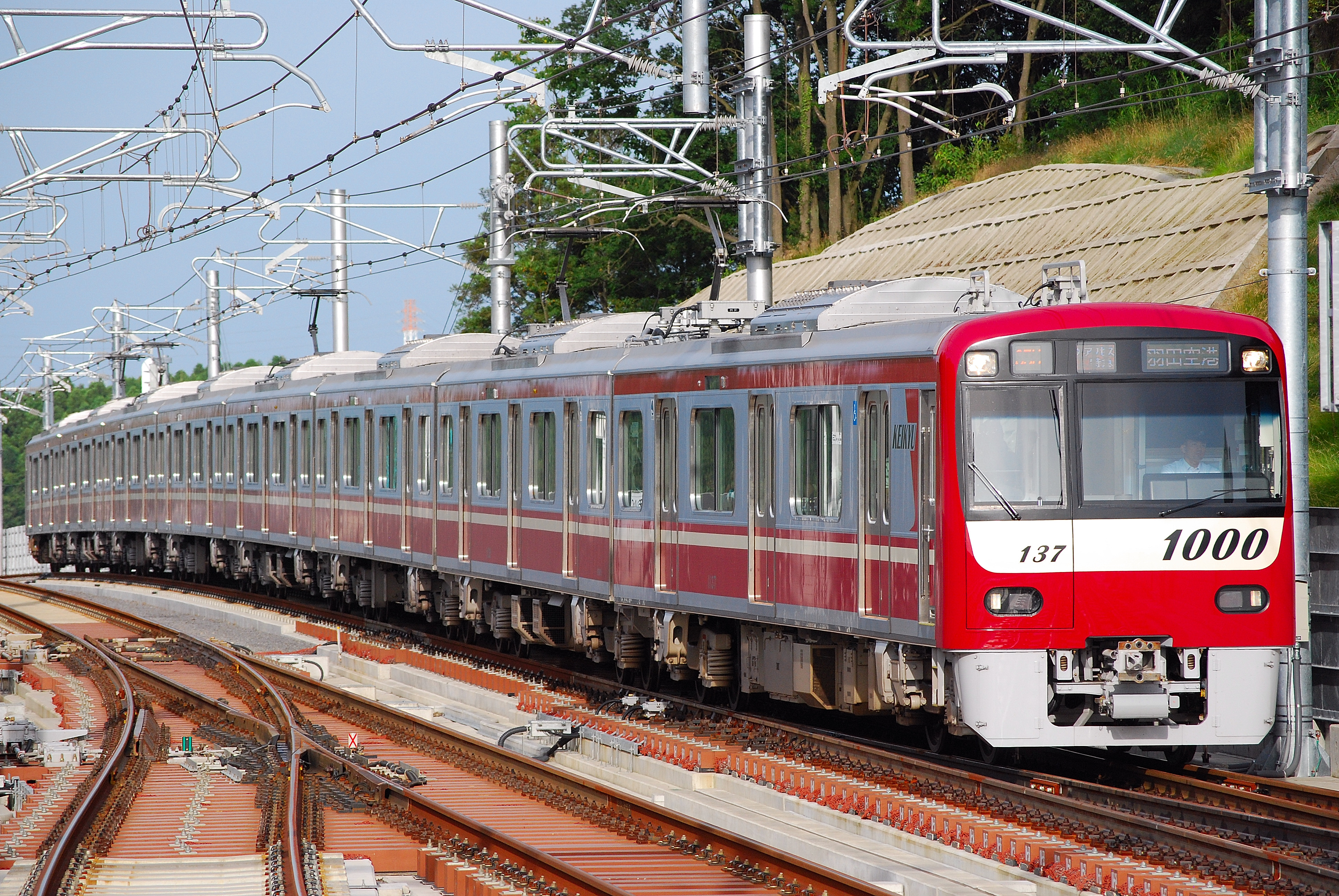
Extensive through-service arrangements in Japan allow trains owned by one railway to operate far out into other parts of the metropolitan area. This Keikyu train is arriving at Narita Yukawa Station on the Keisei Narita Airport Line in far eastern Tokyo, bound for Haneda Airport and traditional Keikyu territory in southwestern Tokyo via the Hokusō Line, Keisei Oshiage Line, and Toei Asakusa Line. This non-Keikyu trackage is not included as part of Keikyu's network length.

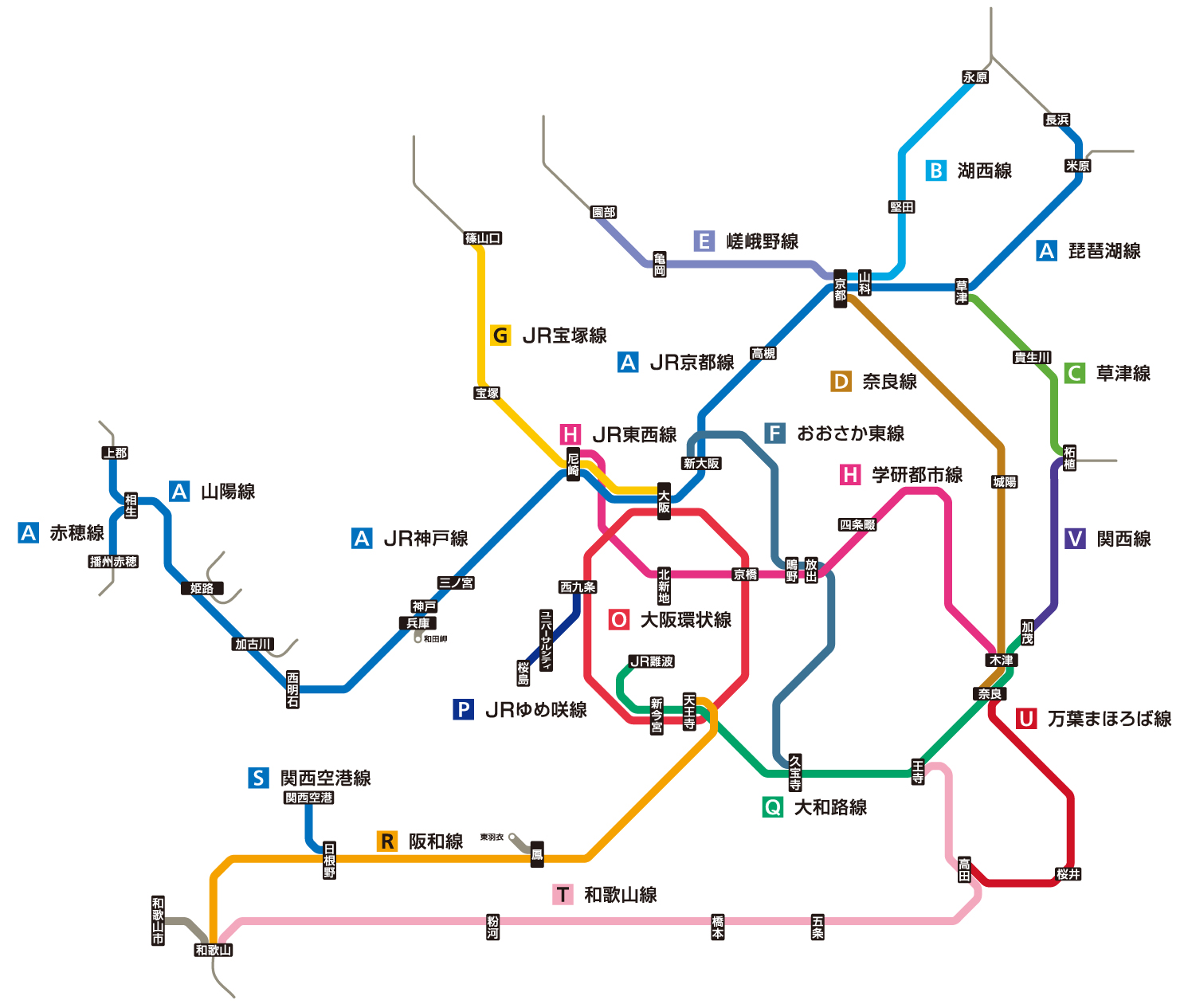
JR West's "Urban Network" in the Osaka-Kobe-Kyoto area provides an extensive web of fast urban and suburban rail service connecting primary and secondary cities in the metropolitan area.

As a general rule, trackage used by one company but owned by another company as part of a trackage rights or Through Train (直通運転) (often translated as through-service) agreement is not counted under the first company. For example, trackage on the Toei Asakusa Line is not counted under Keikyu Corporation, Keisei Electric Railway, or the Hokusō Railway, despite the fact that all three operate their trains on the Asakusa Line. However, this list makes some exceptions to this rule, the most notable being the Keisei-Takasago – Inba-Nihon-Idai section of the Keisei Narita Airport Line, which is shared with trains operated by Hokusō Railway but owned partially by Hokusō Railway (Keisei-Takasago – Komuro) and Chiba New Town Railway (Komuro – Inba-Nihon-Idai). This shared trackage is counted once under Hokusō Railway and again under Keisei Electric Railway.

Similar exceptions include trackage owned by third-sector railways that do not own any of their own rolling stock and instead contract out train operations to through-servicing operators. Notable examples include the double-track approach into Narita Airport, which is owned by the third-sector Narita Airport Rapid Railway. All trains on this railway, however, are operated by either JR East or Keisei Electric Railway, with each operator getting dedicated usage of one of the two tracks into the Airport. In this situation, the JR East single-track section is counted in the JR total, while the Keisei single-track section is counted in the Keisei total.

=== Ridership ===
Both average daily and annual ridership are included, because only average daily ridership or annual ridership (not both) is available for some operators. In cases where data for only one of the two is available, care has been taken to not extrapolate the passenger volume to obtain the other, as there is a potential margin of error when attempting to derive average daily ridership from annual ridership (which is usually rounded to the nearest thousand passengers) and natural disasters or other unforeseen situations may force some operators to shut down for extended periods of time, as happened with the Sendai Subway in the days following the 2011 Tōhoku earthquake and tsunami.

=== Categories ===
For readability and ease of comparison across metropolitan areas, systems within each metropolitan area are broken down into the following categories:

- Subways are divided into two types: publicly operated and privately owned, and are grouped together with each other regardless of ownership. See 日本の地下鉄 for more details.
  - Publicly operated subways (公営地下鉄): Systems generally considered "subways" and operated directly by government agencies at the city (e.g., Kobe Municipal Subway) or prefecture (e.g., Toei Subway) level.
  - Privately owned subways (民営地下鉄): Systems generally considered "subways" that are owned by private operators (e.g., Tokyo Metro), as well as third-sector (semi-public) subways (e.g., Minatomirai Line).
- Major private railways (大手私鉄): Any of the 15 private railways (excluding subways) considered by the Ministry of Land, Infrastructure, Transport and Tourism and others to be the largest private railways in Japan (by network length, ridership volume, and other metrics), providing critical urban rail service in the Greater Tokyo, Greater Nagoya, Osaka-Kobe-Kyoto, and Fukuoka-Kitakyūshū areas. Japan Railways Group operators such as JR East or West Japan Railway Company (JR West) are generally not considered major private railways because they are descended from the government-owned Japanese National Railways (JNR), despite their size and their status now as private, for-profit railways, following the dissolution of JNR in 1984.
- Semi-major private railways (準大手私鉄): Any of the eight private railways considered by the Ministry of Land, Infrastructure, Transport and Tourism and others to be intermediate in size, smaller than the major private railways but larger in scale than the medium and small private railways (中小私鉄). Examples include Kita-Osaka Kyuko Railway and Sanyo Electric Railway. Like the major private railways, they provide critical urban rail service in the metropolitan areas.
- Japan Rail metropolitan network: Urban rail services operated by Japan Rail Group companies. While JR Group companies administer networks spanning multiple regions and operate various long-distance and intercity services such as limited expresses and Shinkansen high-speed rail, services in metropolitan areas are often focused on providing urban and suburban transit. JR East, for example, is the largest single urban rail operator in the world, carrying around 14 million passengers daily on its extensive rail network in Greater Tokyo.
- Other major railways: Any other major railways not fitting any of the above four categories. Examples include the Tsukuba Express and the Enoshima Electric Railway.
- Other minor railways: Any other systems which provide rail service in the metropolitan area but do not fall into the above categories. Examples include tourist-heavy lines like the Disney Resort Line (a monorail line primarily serving the Tokyo Disney Resort), local people mover systems such as the Yamaman Yūkarigaoka Line (a small automated guideway transit system primarily serving to connect a new town development with a major suburban railway station), or other minor systems like the Mizuma Railway (a minor private railway in suburban Osaka).

== List ==
- Fukuoka
- Hiroshima
- Keihanshin (Osaka-Kobe-Kyoto)
- Nagoya
- Niigata
- Okayama
- Sapporo
- Sendai
- Shizuoka
- Tokyo

=== Fukuoka‒Kitakyushu ===
Urban rail systems in Fukuoka-Kitakyushu
Cat.	Operator	Icon	Line	Stations	Length (km)	Average daily ridership	Fiscal year	Annual ridership	Fiscal year
S	Fukuoka City Subway		Airport Line	13	13.1				
S	Fukuoka City Subway		Hakozaki Line	7	4.7				
S	Fukuoka City Subway		Nanakuma Line	16	12.0	62,917	2010		
S	Fukuoka City Subway	Total		35	29.8	348,319	2010	127,136,349	2010
P	Nishi-Nippon Railroad (Nishitetsu)		Tenjin Ōmuta Line	49	74.8				
P	Nishi-Nippon Railroad (Nishitetsu)		Dazaifu Line	3	2.4				
P	Nishi-Nippon Railroad (Nishitetsu)		Amagi Line	12	17.9				
P	Nishi-Nippon Railroad (Nishitetsu)		Kaizuka Line	10	11.0	33,484	2010		
P	Nishi-Nippon Railroad (Nishitetsu)	Total		72	106.1	542,994	2010	103,209,000	2010
J	Kyūshū Railway Company (JR Kyūshū) (Note: Defined as shown by JR Kyushu (as of 5 August 2019).)	JK	Chikuhi Line (Meinohama ‒ Karatsu)	19	42.6				
J	Kyūshū Railway Company (JR Kyūshū)	JC	Fukuhoku Yutaka Line (Hakata ‒ Kurosaki)	27	66.6				
J	Kyūshū Railway Company (JR Kyūshū)	JJ	Gotōji Line (Tagawa-Gotōji ‒ Shin-Iizuka)	6	13.3				
J	Kyūshū Railway Company (JR Kyūshū)	JG	Haruda Line (Chikuhō Line) (Keisen ‒ Haruda)	5	20.8				
J	Kyūshū Railway Company (JR Kyūshū)	JI	Hita-Hikosan Line (Jōno ‒ Tagawa-Gotōji)	11	30.0				
J	Kyūshū Railway Company (JR Kyūshū)	JA; JB	Kagoshima Main Line (Mojikō ‒ Arao)	60	151.6				
J	Kyūshū Railway Company (JR Kyūshū)	JK	Karatsu Line (Karatsu ‒ Nishi-Karatsu)	2	2.2				
J	Kyūshū Railway Company (JR Kyūshū)	JD	Kashii Line (Saitozaki ‒ Umi)	16	25.4				
J	Kyūshū Railway Company (JR Kyūshū)	JH	Nagasaki Main Line (Tosu ‒ Saga)	8	25.0				
J	Kyūshū Railway Company (JR Kyūshū)	JF	Nippō Main Line (Kokura ‒ Yukuhashi)	10	25.0				
J	Kyūshū Railway Company (JR Kyūshū)	JA	San'yō Main Line (Moji ‒ Shimonoseki)	2	6.3				
J	Kyūshū Railway Company (JR Kyūshū)	JG	Wakamatsu Line (Chikuhō Line) (Wakamatsu ‒ Orio)	6	10.8				
J	Kyūshū Railway Company (JR Kyūshū)	Total		157	491.1				
M	Kitakyushu Monorail		Kitakyushu Monorail	13	8.8	30,260	2010	11,044,879	2010
O	Amagi Railway		Amagi Railway Amagi Line	11	13.7	3,700	2008	1,348,000	2008
O	Chikuhō Electric Railroad		Chikuhō Electric Railroad Line	21	16.0	13,549	2010		
O	Heisei Chikuhō Railway		Heisei Chikuhō Railway Ita Line	15	16.1				
O	Heisei Chikuhō Railway		Heisei Chikuhō Railway Itoda Line	6	6.8				
O	Heisei Chikuhō Railway		Heisei Chikuhō Railway Tagawa Line	16	26.3				
O	Heisei Chikuhō Railway	Total		35	49.2			1,915,683	2010

=== Hiroshima ===
Urban rail systems in Hiroshima
Cat.	Operator	Icon	Line	Stations	Length (km)	Average daily ridership	Fiscal year	Annual ridership	Fiscal year
J	West Japan Railway Company (JR West) (Note: JR West's Hiroshima Urban Network (as of 31 July 2019).)	P	Geibi Line (Hiroshima ‒ Karuga)	9	20.6				
J	West Japan Railway Company (JR West)	B	Kabe Line (Yokogawa ‒ Aki-Kameyama)	14	15.6				
J	West Japan Railway Company (JR West)	Y	Kure Line (Hiro ‒ Kaitaichi)	11	26.8				
J	West Japan Railway Company (JR West)	G R	San'yō Main Line (Iwakuni ‒ Shiraichi)	27	82.2				
J	West Japan Railway Company (JR West)	Total		58	145.2				
M	Hiroshima Electric Railway (Hiroden)		Hiroden Main Line	20	5.4				
M	Hiroshima Electric Railway (Hiroden)		Hiroden Ujina Line	20	5.7				
M	Hiroshima Electric Railway (Hiroden)		Hiroden Eba Line	7	2.6				
M	Hiroshima Electric Railway (Hiroden)		Hiroden Hakushima Line	5	1.2				
M	Hiroshima Electric Railway (Hiroden)		Hiroden Minami Line (Hijiyama Line)	7	2.5				
M	Hiroshima Electric Railway (Hiroden)		Hiroden Yokogawa Line	5	1.4				
M	Hiroshima Electric Railway (Hiroden)		Hiroden Miyajima Line	22	16.1				
M	Hiroshima Electric Railway (Hiroden)	Total		78	34.9	101,000	2010	36,852,000	2010
M	Hiroshima Rapid Transit		Astram Line	21	18.4	50,708	2010	18,508,279	2010
O	Nishikigawa Railway		Nishikigawa Railway Nishikigawa Seiryū Line	12	32.7			514,000	2009
O	Skyrail Service		Skyrail Midorizaka Line	3	1.3			514,000	2009

=== Nagoya (Chūkyō) ===
Urban rail systems in Greater Nagoya
Cat.	Operator	Icon	Line	Stations	Length (km)	Average daily ridership	Fiscal year	Annual ridership	Fiscal year
S	Nagoya Municipal Subway		Higashiyama Line	22	20.6				
S	Nagoya Municipal Subway		Meijō Line	28	26.4				
S	Nagoya Municipal Subway		Meikō Line	7	6.0				
S	Nagoya Municipal Subway		Tsurumai Line	20	20.4				
S	Nagoya Municipal Subway		Sakura-dōri Line	21	19.1				
S	Nagoya Municipal Subway		Kami-iida Line	2	0.8				
S	Nagoya Municipal Subway	Total		87	93.3			421,584,815	2010
P	Kintetsu Railway (Kintetsu) (Note: Defined here as Kintetsu's network in the Greater Nagoya Area (Nagoya Line, Yunoyama Line, Suzuka Line, Yamada Line, Toba Line, and Shima Line).)	E	Nagoya Line	44	78.8				
P	Kintetsu Railway (Kintetsu)	K	Yunoyama Line	10	15.4				
P	Kintetsu Railway (Kintetsu)	L	Suzuka Line	5	8.2				
P	Kintetsu Railway (Kintetsu)	M	Yamada Line	14	28.3				
P	Kintetsu Railway (Kintetsu)	M	Toba Line	5	13.2				
P	Kintetsu Railway (Kintetsu)	M	Shima Line	16	24.5				
P	Kintetsu Railway (Kintetsu)	Total		89	168.4				
P	Nagoya Railroad (Meitetsu)	NH	Meitetsu Nagoya Main Line	60	99.8				
P	Nagoya Railroad (Meitetsu)	TH	Meitetsu Takehana Line	9	10.3				
P	Nagoya Railroad (Meitetsu)	TH	Meitetsu Hashima Line	2	1.3				
P	Nagoya Railroad (Meitetsu)	BS	Meitetsu Bisai Line	22	30.9				
P	Nagoya Railroad (Meitetsu)	TB	Meitetsu Tsushima Line	8	11.8				
P	Nagoya Railroad (Meitetsu)	KG	Meitetsu Kakamigahara Line	18	17.6				
P	Nagoya Railroad (Meitetsu)	IY	Meitetsu Inuyama Line	17	26.8				
P	Nagoya Railroad (Meitetsu)	HM	Meitetsu Hiromi Line	11	22.3				
P	Nagoya Railroad (Meitetsu)	KM	Meitetsu Komaki Line	14	20.6				
P	Nagoya Railroad (Meitetsu)	CH	Meitetsu Chikkō Line	2	1.5				
P	Nagoya Railroad (Meitetsu)	TA	Meitetsu Tokoname Line	23	31.5				
P	Nagoya Railroad (Meitetsu)	TA	Meitetsu Airport Line	3	4.2				
P	Nagoya Railroad (Meitetsu)	KC	Meitetsu Kōwa Line	19	28.8				
P	Nagoya Railroad (Meitetsu)	KC	Meitetsu Chita New Line	6	13.9				
P	Nagoya Railroad (Meitetsu)	TT	Meitetsu Toyota Line	8	15.2				
P	Nagoya Railroad (Meitetsu)	MY	Meitetsu Mikawa Line (Sanage ‒ Chiryū)	23	39.8				
P	Nagoya Railroad (Meitetsu)	MU	Meitetsu Mikawa Line (Chiryū ‒ Hekinan)	23	39.8				
P	Nagoya Railroad (Meitetsu)	GN	Meitetsu Nishio Line	14	24.7				
P	Nagoya Railroad (Meitetsu)	GN	Meitetsu Gamagōri Line	10	17.6				
P	Nagoya Railroad (Meitetsu)	TK	Meitetsu Toyokawa Line	5	7.2				
P	Nagoya Railroad (Meitetsu)	ST	Meitetsu Seto Line	20	20.6				
P	Nagoya Railroad (Meitetsu)	Total		275	444.9			344,382,000	2011
J	Central Japan Railway Company (JR Central) (Note: Defined here as the TOICA coverage area (as of 2012.05.30), together with the Sekigahara ‒ Maibara and Ōgaki ‒ Mino-Akasaka sections of the Tōkaidō Main Line; the Yokkaichi ‒ Kameyama section of the Kansai Main Line; the Kameyama ‒ Taki section of the Kisei Main Line; the Sangū Line; and the Toyokawa ‒ Hon-Nagashino section of the Iida Line. Unlike Greater Tokyo and Osaka‒Kobe‒Kyoto, JR Central has no suburban area (近郊区間) defined for the Greater Nagoya area for fare calculation purposes, and the TOICA coverage area is limited, with some trains continuing beyond the boundaries of the current coverage area. Line colors and letters are from JR Central (as of 31 July 2019).)	CF	Chūō Main Line (Nagoya ‒ Nakatsugawa)	20	79.9				
J	Central Japan Railway Company (JR Central)	CD	Iida Line (Toyohashi ‒ Hon-Nagashino)	19	32.1				
J	Central Japan Railway Company (JR Central)	CJ	Kansai Main Line (Nagoya ‒ Kameyama)	18	59.9				
J	Central Japan Railway Company (JR Central)		Kisei Main Line (Kameyama ‒ Taki)	10	42.5				
J	Central Japan Railway Company (JR Central)		Sangū Line (Taki ‒ Toba)	11	29.1				
J	Central Japan Railway Company (JR Central)	CI	Taita Line (Tajimi ‒ Mino Ōta)	8	17.8				
J	Central Japan Railway Company (JR Central)	CG	Takayama Main Line (Gifu ‒ Mino Ōta)	8	27.3				
J	Central Japan Railway Company (JR Central)	CE	Taketoyo Line (Ōbu ‒ Taketoyo)	10	19.3				
J	Central Japan Railway Company (JR Central)	CA	Tōkaidō Main Line (Toyohashi ‒ Maibara)	42	152.3				
J	Central Japan Railway Company (JR Central)		Tōkaidō Main Line (Ōgaki ‒ Mino-Akasaka)	3	5.0				
J	Central Japan Railway Company (JR Central)	Total		138	465.2				
M	Aichi Loop Railway		Aichi Loop Line	23	45.3	38,759	2010	14,140,000	2010
M	Aichi Rapid Transit		Linimo (Tōbu Kyūryō Line)	9	8.9	18,500	2011	6,772,000	2011
M	Nagoya Guideway Bus (Note: Operated with buses, but also classified as a railway.)		Yutorito Line	9	6.5			3,578,785	2010
M	Nagoya Rinkai Rapid Transit		Aonami Line	11	15.2			10,244,154	2010
M	Toyohashi Railroad		Toyohashi Railroad Atsumi Line	16	18.0			7,504,000	2010
M	Toyohashi Railroad		Toyohashi Railroad Azumada Main Line	14	5.4			2,811,000	2010
M	Toyohashi Railroad	Total		30	23.4				
O	Akechi Railroad		Akechi Railroad Akechi Line	11	25.1			439,954	2010
O	Ise Railway		Ise Railway Ise Line	10	22.3	4,314	2010	1,574,743	2010
O	JR-Central Transport Service Company		JR-Central Transport Service Jōhoku Line	6	11.2			400,513	2009
O	Nagaragawa Railway		Nagaragawa Railway Etsumi-Nan Line	38	72.1			776,714	2010
O	Sangi Railway		Sangi Railway Sangi Line	15	26.6				
O	Sangi Railway		Sangi Railway Hokusei Line	13	20.4				
O	Sangi Railway	Total		28	47.0	15,066	2010	5,499,068	2010
O	Tarumi Railway		Tarumi Railway Tarumi Line	19	34.5			602,383	2010
O	Yokkaichi Asunarou Railway		Hachiōji Line	2	1.3				
O	Yokkaichi Asunarou Railway		Utsube Line	8	5.7				
O	Yokkaichi Asunarou Railway	Total		9	7.0				
O	Yōrō Railway		Yōrō Railway Yōrō Line	27	57.5			6,423,850	2010

=== Niigata ===
Urban rail systems in Niigata
Cat.	Operator	Icon	Line	Stations	Length (km)	Average daily ridership	Fiscal year	Annual ridership	Fiscal year
J	East Japan Railway Company (JR East) (Note: Defined here as the Suica coverage area (as of 2012.05.31) in the Niigata area, omitting the Jōetsu Shinkansen. The Suica coverage area is identical in scope to JR East's Niigata Suburban Area (新潟近郊区間))		Ban'etsu West Line (Gosen ‒ Niitsu)	5	9.9				
J	East Japan Railway Company (JR East)		Echigo Line (Yoshida ‒ Niigata)	15	34.0				
J	East Japan Railway Company (JR East)		Hakushin Line (Niigata ‒ Shibata)	10	27.3				
J	East Japan Railway Company (JR East)		Shin'etsu Main Line (Nagaoka ‒ Niigata)	20	63.3				
J	East Japan Railway Company (JR East)		Uetsu Main Line (Niitsu ‒ Shibata)	7	26.0				
J	East Japan Railway Company (JR East)		Yahiko Line (Yahiko ‒ Higashi-Sanjō)	8	17.4				
J	East Japan Railway Company (JR East)	Total		58	177.9				

=== Okayama ===
Urban rail systems in Okayama
Cat.	Operator	Icon	Line	Stations	Length (km)	Average daily ridership	Fiscal year	Annual ridership	Fiscal year
J	West Japan Railway Company (JR West) (Note: As defined by JR West (as of 31 July 2019).)	N	Akō Line (Sōgo ‒ Higashi-Okayama)	13	37.8				
J	West Japan Railway Company (JR West)	Z	Fukuen Line (Fukuyama ‒ Fuchū)	15	23.6				
J	West Japan Railway Company (JR West)	V	Hakubi Line (Kurashiki ‒ Niimi)	14	64.4				
J	West Japan Railway Company (JR West)	U	Kibi Line (Okayama ‒ Sōja)	10	20.4				
J	West Japan Railway Company (JR West)	S W X	San'yō Main Line (Mitsuishi ‒ Itozaki)	29	128.5				
J	West Japan Railway Company (JR West)	M	Seto Ōhashi Line (Okayama ‒ Kojima)	12	27.8				
J	West Japan Railway Company (JR West)	T	Tsuyama Line (Okayama ‒ Tsuyama)	17	58.7				
J	West Japan Railway Company (JR West)	L	Uno Line (Chayamachi ‒ Uno)	8	17.9				
J	West Japan Railway Company (JR West)	Total		110	379.1				
M	Okayama Electric Tramway		Okaden Higashiyama Line	10	3.1				
M	Okayama Electric Tramway		Okaden Seikibashi Line	7	1.6				
M	Okayama Electric Tramway	Total		16	4.7			3,332,791	2010
O	Ibara Railway		Ibara Railway Ibara Line	15	41.7			1,017,000	2009
O	Mizushima Rinkai Railway		Mizushima Main Line	10	10.4			1,593,220	2010

=== Osaka‒Kobe‒Kyoto (Keihanshin) ===
Urban rail systems in Keihanshin
Cat.	Operator	Icon	Line	Stations	Length (km)	Average daily ridership	Fiscal year	Annual ridership	Fiscal year
S	Osaka Metro (Private) (Note: The Osaka Metro is the only subway system in Japan to be legally classified as a tramway despite having characteristics of a heavy rail metro system.)		Midosuji Line	20	24.5				
S	Osaka Metro (Private)		Tanimachi Line	26	28.1				
S	Osaka Metro (Private)		Yotsubashi Line	11	11.4				
S	Osaka Metro (Private)		Chuo Line	15	21.1				
S	Osaka Metro (Private)		Sennichimae Line	14	12.6				
S	Osaka Metro (Private)		Sakaisuji Line	10	8.5				
S	Osaka Metro (Private)		Nagahori Tsurumi-ryokuchi Line	17	15.0				
S	Osaka Metro (Private)		Imazatosuji Line	11	11.9				
S	Osaka Metro (Private)		Nankō Port Town Line	10	7.9	71,071	2010		
S	Osaka Metro (Private)	Total		109	141.0			...	2010
S	Kobe Municipal Subway (Public)		Seishin-Yamate Line	16	22.7			95,479,000	2010
S	Kobe Municipal Subway (Public)		Kaigan Line	10	7.9			15,575,000	2010
S	Kobe Municipal Subway (Public)		Hokushin Line	2	7.5	25,501	2010	9,308,000	2010
S	Kobe Municipal Subway (Public)	Total		28	38.1			120,362,000	2010
S	Kyoto Municipal Subway (Public)		Kyoto Municipal Subway Karasuma Line	15	13.7				
S	Kyoto Municipal Subway (Public)		Kyoto Municipal Subway Tozai Line	17	17.5				
S	Kyoto Municipal Subway (Public)	Total		31	31.2	330,191	2010	120,519,560	2010
P	Hankyū Corporation (Hankyū)		Hankyū Kōbe Main Line	16	32.3				
P	Hankyū Corporation (Hankyū)		Hankyū Kōbe Rapid Line	4	2.8				
P	Hankyū Corporation (Hankyū)		Hankyū Itami Line	4	3.1				
P	Hankyū Corporation (Hankyū)		Hankyū Imazu Line	10	9.3				
P	Hankyū Corporation (Hankyū)		Hankyū Kōyō Line	3	2.2				
P	Hankyū Corporation (Hankyū)		Hankyū Takarazuka Main Line	19	24.5				
P	Hankyū Corporation (Hankyū)		Hankyū Minoo Line	4	4.0				
P	Hankyū Corporation (Hankyū)		Hankyū Kyōto Main Line	27	47.7				
P	Hankyū Corporation (Hankyū)		Hankyū Senri Line	11	13.6				
P	Hankyū Corporation (Hankyū)		Hankyū Arashiyama Line	4	4.1				
P	Hankyū Corporation (Hankyū)	Total		89	143.6			608,632,000	2011
P	Hanshin Electric Railway (Hanshin)		Hanshin Main Line	33	32.1				
P	Hanshin Electric Railway (Hanshin)		Hanshin Namba Line	11	10.1				
P	Hanshin Electric Railway (Hanshin)		Hanshin Mukogawa Line	4	1.7				
P	Hanshin Electric Railway (Hanshin)		Hanshin Kōbe Rapid Line	7	5.0				
P	Hanshin Electric Railway (Hanshin)	Total		50	48.9			218,560,000	2011
P	Keihan Electric Railway (Keihan)		Keihan Main Line	40	49.3				
P	Keihan Electric Railway (Keihan)		Keihan Ōtō Line	3	2.3				
P	Keihan Electric Railway (Keihan)		Keihan Nakanoshima Line	5	3.0				
P	Keihan Electric Railway (Keihan)		Keihan Katano Line	8	6.9				
P	Keihan Electric Railway (Keihan)		Keihan Uji Line	8	7.6				
P	Keihan Electric Railway (Keihan)		Keihan Keishin Line	7	7.5				
P	Keihan Electric Railway (Keihan)		Keihan Ishiyama Sakamoto Line	21	14.1				
P	Keihan Electric Railway (Keihan)	Total		87	90.7			279,394,000	2011
P	Kintetsu Railway (Kintetsu) (Note: Defined here as Kintetsu's network in the Osaka‒Kobe‒Kyoto area, comprising the Nara / Kyoto group (Namba Line, Nara Line, Ikoma Line, Keihanna Line, Kyoto Line, Kashihara Line, Tenri Line, and Tawaramoto Line), the Minami-Osaka group (Minami Osaka Line, Domyoji Line, Nagano Line, Gose Line, and Yoshino Line), and two lines of the Osaka / Nagoya group (the Shigi Line and the Ōsaka Uehommachi ‒ Aoyamachō section of the Osaka Line).)	D	Osaka Line	40	77.9				
P	Kintetsu Railway (Kintetsu)	J	Shigi Line	3	2.8				
P	Kintetsu Railway (Kintetsu)	A	Namba Line	3	2.0				
P	Kintetsu Railway (Kintetsu)	A	Nara Line	22	30.8				
P	Kintetsu Railway (Kintetsu)	G	Ikoma Line	12	12.4				
P	Kintetsu Railway (Kintetsu)	C	Keihanna Line	8	18.8				
P	Kintetsu Railway (Kintetsu)	B	Kyoto Line	26	34.6				
P	Kintetsu Railway (Kintetsu)	B	Kashihara Line	17	23.8				
P	Kintetsu Railway (Kintetsu)	H	Tenri Line	4	4.5				
P	Kintetsu Railway (Kintetsu)	I	Tawaramoto Line	8	10.1				
P	Kintetsu Railway (Kintetsu)	F	Minami Osaka Line	28	39.7				
P	Kintetsu Railway (Kintetsu)	N	Domyoji Line	3	2.2				
P	Kintetsu Railway (Kintetsu)	O	Nagano Line	8	12.5				
P	Kintetsu Railway (Kintetsu)	P	Gose Line	4	5.2				
P	Kintetsu Railway (Kintetsu)	F	Yoshino Line	16	25.2				
P	Kintetsu Railway (Kintetsu)	Total		185	302.5			566,061,000	2011 (Note: Annual ridership for Kintetsu includes passengers on lines outside of the Osaka‒Kobe‒Kyoto area, including lines in the Greater Nagoya area.)
P	Nankai Electric Railway (Nankai)		Nankai Main Line	43	64.2				
P	Nankai Electric Railway (Nankai)		Takashinohama Line	3	1.5				
P	Nankai Electric Railway (Nankai)		Tanagawa Line	4	2.6				
P	Nankai Electric Railway (Nankai)		Kada Line	8	9.6				
P	Nankai Electric Railway (Nankai)		Wakayamako Line	2	2.8				
P	Nankai Electric Railway (Nankai)		Nankai Airport Line	3	8.8				
P	Nankai Electric Railway (Nankai)		Koya Line	42	63.8				
P	Nankai Electric Railway (Nankai)		Shiomibashi Line	6	4.6				
P	Nankai Electric Railway (Nankai)	Total		99	157.9	586,866	2010	223,484,000	2011
P	Kita-Osaka Kyūkō Railway		Kita-Osaka Kyūkō Railway Namboku Line	4	5.9			54,586,000	2010
P	Kōbe Rapid Transit Railway		Hankyū Kōbe Kōsoku Line	See Tōzai Line (Kobe)					
P	Kōbe Rapid Transit Railway		Hanshin Kōbe Kōsoku Line	See Tōzai Line (Kobe)					
P	Kōbe Rapid Transit Railway		Shintetsu Kōbe Kōsoku Line	See Shintetsu Kobe Kosoku Line					
P	Nakanoshima Rapid Railway	See Keihan Nakanoshima Line							
P	Nara Ikoma Rapid Railway	See Kintetsu Keihanna Line							
P	Semboku Rapid Railway		Semboku Rapid Railway	6	14.3	135,450	2011	49,368,000	2010
P	Sanyo Electric Railway		Sanyo Electric Railway Main Line	43	54.7				
P	Sanyo Electric Railway		Sanyo Electric Railway Aboshi Line	7	8.5				
P	Sanyo Electric Railway	Total		49	63.2			53,144,000	2011
J	West Japan Railway Company (JR West) (Note: Defined as the JR West Osaka Suburban Area for fare calculation purposes, omitting Shinkansen sections, all within JR West's Urban Network (アーバンネットワーク) (as of 31 July 2019).)	A	Akō Line (Aioi ‒ Banshū Akō)	4	10.5				
J	West Japan Railway Company (JR West)	A	Biwako Line (Kyōto ‒ Nagahama)	23	75.4				
J	West Japan Railway Company (JR West)	H	Gakkentoshi Line (Kyōbashi ‒ Kizu)	24	55.4				
J	West Japan Railway Company (JR West)		Hagoromo Line (Ōtori ‒ Higashi-Hagoromo)	2	1.7				
J	West Japan Railway Company (JR West)	R	Hanwa Line (Tennōji ‒ Wakayama)	35	61.3				
J	West Japan Railway Company (JR West)	A	Hokuriku Main Line (Nagahama ‒ Ōmi-Shiotsu)	7	18.6				
J	West Japan Railway Company (JR West)	A	JR Kōbe Line (Ōsaka ‒ Himeji)	39	87.9				
J	West Japan Railway Company (JR West)	A	JR Kyōto Line (Ōsaka ‒ Kyōto)	17	42.8				
J	West Japan Railway Company (JR West)	G	JR Takarazuka Line / Fukuchiyama Line (Ōsaka ‒ Tanikawa)	24	73.0				
J	West Japan Railway Company (JR West)	H	JR Tōzai Line (Kyōbashi ‒ Amagasaki)	9	12.5				
J	West Japan Railway Company (JR West)	P	JR Yumesaki Line (Nishi-Kujō ‒ Sakurajima)	4	4.1				
J	West Japan Railway Company (JR West)	I	Kakogawa Line (Kakogawa ‒ Tanikawa)	21	48.5				
J	West Japan Railway Company (JR West)	V	Kansai Main Line (Kamo ‒ Tsuge)	9	41.0				
J	West Japan Railway Company (JR West)	S	Kansai Airport Line (Hineno ‒ Kansai Airport)	3	11.1				
J	West Japan Railway Company (JR West)	B	Kosei Line (Yamashina ‒ Ōmi-Shiotsu)	21	74.1				
J	West Japan Railway Company (JR West)	C	Kusatsu Line (Kusatsu ‒ Tsuge)	11	36.7				
J	West Japan Railway Company (JR West)	U	Man-yo Mahoroba Line (Nara ‒ Takada)	14	29.4				
J	West Japan Railway Company (JR West)	D	Nara Line (Kyōto ‒ Kizu)	19	34.7				
J	West Japan Railway Company (JR West)	F	Osaka Higashi Line (Shin-Osaka ‒ Kyūhōji)	14	20.2				
J	West Japan Railway Company (JR West)	O	Osaka Loop Line (Ōsaka ‒ Ōsaka)	19	21.7				
J	West Japan Railway Company (JR West)	E	Sagano Line (Kyōto ‒ Sonobe)	16	34.2				
J	West Japan Railway Company (JR West)	Q	Yamatoji Line (JR Namba ‒ Kamo)	22	54.0				
J	West Japan Railway Company (JR West)		Wadamisaki Line (Hyōgo ‒ Wadamisaki)	2	2.7				
J	West Japan Railway Company (JR West)	T	Wakayama Line (Ōji ‒ Wakayama)	36	87.5				
J	West Japan Railway Company (JR West)	Total		378	993.0				
M	Eizan Electric Railway		Eizan Electric Railway Eizan Main Line	8	5.6				
M	Eizan Electric Railway		Eizan Electric Railway Kurama Line	10	8.8				
M	Eizan Electric Railway	Total		17	14.4			6,537,000	2010
M	Hankai Tramway		Hankai Line	30	14.1				
M	Hankai Tramway		Hankai Uemachi Line	11	4.6				
M	Hankai Tramway	Total		40	18.7			7,571,000	2008
M	Keifuku Electric Railroad		Keifuku Electric Railroad Arashiyama Main Line	13	7.2				
M	Keifuku Electric Railroad		Keifuku Electric Railroad Kitano Line	9	3.8				
M	Keifuku Electric Railroad	Total		21	11.0			6,842,000	2011
M	Kōbe Electric Railway (Shintetsu)		Shintetsu Arima Line	15	22.5			42,146,000	2011
M	Kōbe Electric Railway (Shintetsu)		Shintetsu Sanda Line	10	12.0			42,146,000	2011
M	Kōbe Electric Railway (Shintetsu)		Shintetsu Kōen-Toshi Line	4	5.5			42,146,000	2011
M	Kōbe Electric Railway (Shintetsu)		Shintetsu Ao Line	20	29.2			42,146,000	2011
M	Kōbe Electric Railway (Shintetsu)		Shintetsu Kōbe Rapid Line	2	0.4			16,343,000	2011
M	Kōbe Electric Railway (Shintetsu)	Total		47	69.6				
M	Kobe New Transit		Port Island Line	12	10.8			21,363,000	2010
M	Kobe New Transit		Rokkō Island Line	6	4.5			11,956,000	2010
M	Kobe New Transit	Total		18	15.3			33,318,000	2010
M	Nose Electric Railway		Nose Electric Railway Myōken Line	14	12.2				
M	Nose Electric Railway		Nose Electric Railway Nissei Line	2	2.6				
M	Nose Electric Railway	Total		15	14.8			21,860,154	2010
M	Osaka Monorail		Osaka Monorail Main Line	14	21.2				
M	Osaka Monorail		Osaka Monorail Saito Line	5	6.8				
M	Osaka Monorail	Total		18	28.0	99,721	2010	36,398,058	2010
O	Chizu Express		Chizu Express Chizu Line	14	56.1			1,050,890	2010
O	Hōjō Railway		Hōjō Railway Hōjō Line	8	13.6			307,000	2010
O	Iga Railway		Iga Railway Iga Line	14	16.6	5,010	2010	1,828,695	2010
O	Mizuma Railway		Mizuma Railway Mizuma Line	10	5.5			2,030,000	2009
O	Ohmi Railway		Ohmi Railway Main Line	25	47.7				
O	Ohmi Railway		Ohmi Railway Taga Line	3	2.5				
O	Ohmi Railway		Ohmi Railway Yōkaichi Line	7	9.3				
O	Ohmi Railway	Total		33	59.5	12,571	2010	4,588,327	2010
O	Shigaraki Kōgen Railway		Shigaraki Kōgen Railway Shigaraki Kōgen Line	6	14.7	1,345	2010	491,015	2010
O	Wakayama Electric Railway		Kishigawa Line	14	14.3			2,170,102	2010

=== Sapporo ===
Urban rail systems in Sapporo
Cat.	Operator	Icon	Line	Stations	Length (km)	Average daily ridership	Fiscal year	Annual ridership	Fiscal year
S	Sapporo City Transportation Bureau		Namboku Line	16	14.3				
S	Sapporo City Transportation Bureau		Tōzai Line	19	20.1				
S	Sapporo City Transportation Bureau		Tōhō Line	14	13.6				
S	Sapporo City Transportation Bureau	Total		46	48.0	561,262	2010	204,860,548	2010
J	Hokkaidō Railway Company (JR Hokkaidō) (Note: Defined here as JR Hokkaidō's Sapporo suburban area network (as of 2012.05.31).)		Chitose Line (Shiroishi ‒ New Chitose Airport)	13	40.8				
J	Hokkaidō Railway Company (JR Hokkaidō)		Chitose Line (Minami-Chitose ‒ Tomakomai)	4	27.2				
J	Hokkaidō Railway Company (JR Hokkaidō)		Hakodate Main Line (Otaru ‒ Iwamizawa)	27	74.4				
J	Hokkaidō Railway Company (JR Hokkaidō)		Sasshō Line (Sapporo ‒ Hokkaidō-Iryōdaigaku)	14	30.5				
J	Hokkaidō Railway Company (JR Hokkaidō)	Total		55	172.9				
M	Sapporo City Transportation Bureau		Sapporo Streetcar	23	8.4	20,074	2010	7,327,120	2010

=== Sendai ===
Urban rail systems in Sendai
Cat.	Operator	Icon	Line	Stations	Length (km)	Average daily ridership	Fiscal year	Annual ridership	Fiscal year
S	Sendai Subway		Namboku Line	17	14.8	150,410	2010	54,448,485	2010
S	Sendai Subway		Tōzai Line	13	13.9	?	?	?	?
S	Sendai Subway	Total		30	28.7	150,410	2010	54,448,485	2010
J	East Japan Railway Company (JR East) (Note: Defined here as the Suica coverage area (as of 2012.05.31) in the Sendai area, omitting the Tōhoku Main Line south of Shiroishi Station and the Tōhoku Shinkansen.)		Jōban Line (Haranomachi ‒ Iwanuma)	17	56.2				
J	East Japan Railway Company (JR East)		Senseki Line (Aoba-dōri ‒ Ishinomaki)	31	50.2				
J	East Japan Railway Company (JR East)		Senzan Line (Sendai ‒ Ayashi)	9	15.2				
J	East Japan Railway Company (JR East)		Tōhoku Main Line (Shiroishi ‒ Kogota)	24	88.2				
J	East Japan Railway Company (JR East)		Tōhoku Main Line (Iwakiri ‒ Rifu)	3	4.2				
J	East Japan Railway Company (JR East)	Total		75	214.0				
M	Sendai Airport Transit		Sendai Airport Access Line	4	7.1	6,670	2010	2,294,400	2010

=== Shizuoka‒Hamamatsu ===
Urban rail systems in Shizuoka-Hamamatsu
Cat.	Operator	Icon	Line	Stations	Length (km)	Average daily ridership	Fiscal year	Annual ridership	Fiscal year
J	Central Japan Railway Company (JR Central) (Note: Defined here as the TOICA coverage area (as of 2012.05.30) east of Toyohashi, together with the Kannami ‒ Atami section of the Tōkaidō Main Line and the Nishi-Fujinomiya ‒ Shibakawa section of the Minobu Line. JR Central has no suburban area (近郊区間) defined for the Shizuoka‒Hamamatsu area for fare calculation purposes, and the TOICA coverage area is limited, with many trains continuing beyond the boundaries of the current coverage area.)	CB	Gotemba Line (Gotemba ‒ Numazu)	9	24.7				
J	Central Japan Railway Company (JR Central)	CC	Minobu Line (Fuji ‒ Shibakawa)	10	19.2				
J	Central Japan Railway Company (JR Central)	CA	Tōkaidō Main Line (Atami ‒ Toyohashi)	42	189.0				
J	Central Japan Railway Company (JR Central)	Total		59	232.9				
M	Enshū Railway		Enshū Railway Line	18	17.8	24,968	2010	9,113,428	2010
M	Izuhakone Railway		Izuhakone Railway Sunzu Line	13	19.8	28,033	2010		
M	Shizuoka Railway		Shizuoka Railway Shizuoka-Shimizu Line	15	11.0	28,332	2010	10,341,000	2010
O	Gakunan Railway		Gakunan Railway Line	10	9.2			773,000	2010
O	Ōigawa Railway		Ōigawa Railway Ōigawa Main Line	19	39.5			777,604	2010
O	Ōigawa Railway		Ōigawa Railway Ikawa Line	14	25.5			777,604	2010
O	Ōigawa Railway	Total		32	65.0			777,604	2010
O	Tenryū Hamanako Railroad		Tenryū Hamanako Railroad Tenryū Hamanako Line	38	67.7			1,549,704	2010
O	Tenryū Hamanako Railroad	Total		38	67.7			1,549,704	2010

=== Tokyo (Kantō) ===
Urban rail systems in Greater Tokyo
Cat.	Operator	Icon	Line	Stations	Length (km)	Average daily ridership	Fiscal year	Annual ridership	Fiscal year
S	Tokyo Metro (Private)		Tokyo Metro Ginza Line	19	14.3	943,606	2017		
S	Tokyo Metro (Private)		Tokyo Metro Marunouchi Line	28	27.4	1,159,898	2017		
S	Tokyo Metro (Private)		Tokyo Metro Hibiya Line	21	20.3	1,213,492	2017		
S	Tokyo Metro (Private)		Tokyo Metro Tōzai Line	23	30.8	1,642,378	2017		
S	Tokyo Metro (Private)		Tokyo Metro Chiyoda Line	20	24	1,447,730	2017		
S	Tokyo Metro (Private)		Tokyo Metro Yūrakuchō Line	24	28.3	1,124,478	2017		
S	Tokyo Metro (Private)		Tokyo Metro Hanzōmon Line	14	16.8	1,006,682	2017		
S	Tokyo Metro (Private)		Tokyo Metro Namboku Line	19	21.3	522,736	2017		
S	Tokyo Metro (Private)		Tokyo Metro Fukutoshin Line	16	11.9	363,654	2017		
S	Tokyo Metro (Private)	Total		143 (Note: Tokyo Metro officially counts Tameike-Sannō (Tokyo Metro Ginza Line and Tokyo Metro Namboku Line) and Kokkai-gijidō-mae (Tokyo Metro Marunouchi Line and Tokyo Metro Chiyoda Line) as a single station with four lines, yielding a total of 142 unique stations.)	195.1	9,424,654	2017	2,277,595,000	2011
S	Toei Subway (Public)		Toei Asakusa Line	20	18.3	718,885	2016		
S	Toei Subway (Public)		Toei Mita Line	27	26.5	638,365	2016		
S	Toei Subway (Public)		Toei Shinjuku Line	21	23.5	745,889	2016		
S	Toei Subway (Public)		Toei Ōedo Line	38	40.7	993,621	2016		
S	Toei Subway (Public)	Total		99	109.0	3,036,760	2016	848,668,000	2010
S	Yokohama Municipal Subway (Public)		Blue Line	32	40.4	492,435	2010		
S	Yokohama Municipal Subway (Public)		Green Line	10	13.0	104,089	2010		
S	Yokohama Municipal Subway (Public)	Total		40	53.4			209,983,726	2010
S	Yokohama Minatomirai Railway (Third-sector)	MM	Minatomirai Line	6	4.1	162,818	2010		
P	Keihin Electric Express Railway (Keikyū)		Keikyū Main Line	50	56.7	1,129,320	2010		
P	Keihin Electric Express Railway (Keikyū)		Keikyū Airport Line	7	6.5	154,727	2010		
P	Keihin Electric Express Railway (Keikyū)		Keikyū Daishi Line	7	4.5	67,676	2010		
P	Keihin Electric Express Railway (Keikyū)		Keikyū Zushi Line	4	5.9	42,788	2010		
P	Keihin Electric Express Railway (Keikyū)		Keikyū Kurihama Line	9	13.4	123,536	2010		
P	Keihin Electric Express Railway (Keikyū)	Total		73	87.0	1,207,565	2010	431,046,000	2011
P	Keiō Corporation (Keiō)		Keiō Line	32	37.9				
P	Keiō Corporation (Keiō)		Keiō New Line	4	3.6				
P	Keiō Corporation (Keiō)		Keiō Sagamihara Line	12	22.6				
P	Keiō Corporation (Keiō)		Keiō Keibajō Line	2	0.9				
P	Keiō Corporation (Keiō)		Keiō Dōbutsuen Line	2	2.0				
P	Keiō Corporation (Keiō)		Keiō Takao Line	7	8.6				
P	Keiō Corporation (Keiō)		Keiō Inokashira Line	17	12.7	547,845	2010		
P	Keiō Corporation (Keiō)	Total		70	88.3	1,727,355	2010	619,063,000	2011
P	Keisei Electric Railway (Keisei)	Icon for the Keisei Main Line.	Keisei Main Line	42	69.3				
P	Keisei Electric Railway (Keisei)	Icon for the Keisei Higashi-Narita Line.	Keisei Higashi-Narita Line	2	1.1				
P	Keisei Electric Railway (Keisei)	Icon for the Keisei Oshiage Line.	Keisei Oshiage Line	6	5.7				
P	Keisei Electric Railway (Keisei)	Icon for the Keisei Kanamachi Line.	Keisei Kanamachi Line	3	2.5				
P	Keisei Electric Railway (Keisei)	Icon for the Keisei Chiba Line.	Keisei Chiba Line	10	12.9				
P	Keisei Electric Railway (Keisei)	Icon for the Keisei Chihara Line.	Keisei Chihara Line	6	10.9				
P	Keisei Electric Railway (Keisei)	Icon for the Narita Sky Access Line.	Keisei Narita Airport Line	8	50.4				
P	Keisei Electric Railway (Keisei)	Total		69	152.8	712,426	2010	255,590,000	2011
P	Odakyū Electric Railway (Odakyū)		Odakyū Odawara Line	47	82.5				
P	Odakyū Electric Railway (Odakyū)		Odakyū Enoshima Line	17	27.6				
P	Odakyū Electric Railway (Odakyū)		Odakyū Tama Line	8	10.6				
P	Odakyū Electric Railway (Odakyū)	Total		70	120.7	1,946,313	2010	708,685,000	2010
P	Sagami Railway (Sōtetsu)		Sōtetsu Main Line	18	24.6				
P	Sagami Railway (Sōtetsu)		Sōtetsu Izumino Line	8	11.3				
P	Sagami Railway (Sōtetsu)		Sōtetsu Shin-yokohama Line	3	6.3				
P	Sagami Railway (Sōtetsu)	Total		28	42.2	614,236	2011	224,810,000	2011
P	Seibu Railway (Seibu)		Seibu Ikebukuro Line	31	57.8				
P	Seibu Railway (Seibu)		Seibu Chichibu Line	6	19.0				
P	Seibu Railway (Seibu)		Seibu Yūrakuchō Line	3	2.6				
P	Seibu Railway (Seibu)		Seibu Toshima Line	2	1.0				
P	Seibu Railway (Seibu)		Seibu Sayama Line	3	4.2				
P	Seibu Railway (Seibu)		Seibu Yamaguchi Line	3	2.8				
P	Seibu Railway (Seibu)		Seibu Shinjuku Line	29	47.5				
P	Seibu Railway (Seibu)		Seibu Seibuen Line	2	2.4				
P	Seibu Railway (Seibu)		Seibu Haijima Line	8	14.3				
P	Seibu Railway (Seibu)		Seibu Tamako Line	7	9.2				
P	Seibu Railway (Seibu)		Seibu Kokubunji Line	5	7.8				
P	Seibu Railway (Seibu)		Seibu Tamagawa Line	6	8.0				
P	Seibu Railway (Seibu)	Total		92	176.6	1,692,523	2010	610,325,000	2010
P	Tōbu Railway (Tōbu)	Tobu Skytree Line	Tōbu Skytree Line	30	41		2010		2011
P	Tōbu Railway (Tōbu)	Tobu Skytree Line	Tōbu Kameido Line	5	3.4		2010		2011
P	Tōbu Railway (Tōbu)	Tobu Skytree Line	Tōbu Daishi Line	2	1.0		2010		2011
P	Tōbu Railway (Tōbu)	Tobu Isesaki Line	Tōbu Isesaki Line	26	75.1		2010		2011
P	Tōbu Railway (Tōbu)	Tobu Isesaki Line	Tōbu Isesaki Line (Oshiage Branch)	2	1.3		2010		2011
P	Tōbu Railway (Tōbu)	Tobu Isesaki Line	Tōbu Sano Line	10	22.1		2010		2011
P	Tōbu Railway (Tōbu)	Tobu Isesaki Line	Tōbu Kiryū Line	8	20.3		2010		2011
P	Tōbu Railway (Tōbu)	Tobu Isesaki Line	Tōbu Koizumi Line	9	18.4		2010		2011
P	Tōbu Railway (Tōbu)		Tōbu Nikkō Line	26	94.5		2010		2011
P	Tōbu Railway (Tōbu)	Tōbu Nikkō Line	Tōbu Utsunomiya Line	11	24.3		2010		2011
P	Tōbu Railway (Tōbu)	Tōbu Nikkō Line	Tōbu Kinugawa Line	8	16.2		2010		2011
P	Tōbu Railway (Tōbu)	Tōbu Urban Park Line	Tobu Urban Park Line	35	62.7		2010		2011
P	Tōbu Railway (Tōbu)		Tōbu Tōjō Line	38	75.0		2010		2011
P	Tōbu Railway (Tōbu)	Tōbu Tōjō Line	Tōbu Ogose Line	8	10.9		2010		2011
P	Tōbu Railway (Tōbu)	Total		204	464.6	2,364,626	2010	855,714,000	2011
P	Tōkyū Corporation (Tōkyū)		Tōkyū Tōyoko Line	21	24.2	1,114,571	2011		2011
P	Tōkyū Corporation (Tōkyū)		Tōkyū Meguro Line	13	11.9	324,052	2011		2011
P	Tōkyū Corporation (Tōkyū)		Tōkyū Den-en-toshi Line	27	31.5	1,162,575	2011		2011
P	Tōkyū Corporation (Tōkyū)		Tōkyū Ōimachi Line	18	12.4	438,979	2011		2011
P	Tōkyū Corporation (Tōkyū)		Tōkyū Ikegami Line	15	10.9	216,844	2011		2011
P	Tōkyū Corporation (Tōkyū)		Tōkyū Tamagawa Line	7	5.6	141,311	2011		2011
P	Tōkyū Corporation (Tōkyū)	Tokyu Corporation	Tōkyū Kodomonokuni Line	3	3.4	11,573	2011		2011
P	Tōkyū Corporation (Tōkyū)		Tōkyū Setagaya Line	10	5.0	53,509	2011		2011
P	Tōkyū Corporation (Tōkyū)		Tōkyū Shin-yokohama Line	3	5.8				
P	Tōkyū Corporation (Tōkyū)	Total		99	110.7			1,065,364,000	2011
M	Shin-Keisei Electric Railway	Icon for the Keisei Matsudo Line.	Shin-Keisei Line	24	26.5	276,495	2010		
J	East Japan Railway Company (JR East) (Note: Defined here as JR East's Tokyo Suburban Area (東京近郊区間) for fare calculation purposes, and roughly correlating with the Suica coverage area (as of 2012.03.17). However, Suica coverage does not extend to the Karasuyama Line, Kashima Line, and Kururi Line, which are considered part of the Tokyo Suburban Area.)								
J	East Japan Railway Company (JR East)		Chūō Main Line (Takao ‒ Nirasaki)	23	93.9				
J	East Japan Railway Company (JR East)	Chūō Line (Rapid)	Chūō Rapid Line (Tōkyō ‒ Takao)	24	53.1				
J	East Japan Railway Company (JR East)	Chūō–Sōbu Line	Chūō-Sōbu Line (Mitaka ‒ Chiba)	39	60.2				
J	East Japan Railway Company (JR East)		Hachikō Line (Hachiōji ‒ Kuragano)	23	92.0				
J	East Japan Railway Company (JR East)	Tōkaidō Line (JR East)	Itō Line (Atami ‒ Itō)	6	16.9				
J	East Japan Railway Company (JR East)	Chūō Line (Rapid)	Itsukaichi Line (Haijima ‒ Musashi Itsukaichi)	7	11.1				
J	East Japan Railway Company (JR East)		Jōban Line (Ueno ‒ Iwaki)	44	211.6				
J	East Japan Railway Company (JR East)	Jōban Line	Jōban Rapid Line	44	211.6				
J	East Japan Railway Company (JR East)	Jōban Line (Local)	Jōban Local Line (Ayase ‒ Toride)	14	29.7				
J	East Japan Railway Company (JR East)		Jōetsu Line (Takasaki ‒ Minakami)	14	59.1				
J	East Japan Railway Company (JR East)		Karasuyama Line (Hōshakuji ‒ Karasuyama)	8	20.4				
J	East Japan Railway Company (JR East)		Kashima Line (Katori ‒ Kashima Soccer Stadium)	6	17.4				
J	East Japan Railway Company (JR East)		Kawagoe Line (Ōmiya ‒ Kawagoe)	6	16.1				
J	East Japan Railway Company (JR East)		Kawagoe Line (Kawagoe ‒ Komagawa)	6	14.5				
J	East Japan Railway Company (JR East)	Keihin–Tōhoku Line	Keihin-Tōhoku Line (Ōmiya ‒ Yokohama)	36	59.1				
J	East Japan Railway Company (JR East)		Keiyō Line (Tōkyō ‒ Soga)	18	54.3				
J	East Japan Railway Company (JR East)		Kururi Line (Kisarazu ‒ Kazusa-Kameyama)	14	32.2				
J	East Japan Railway Company (JR East)		Mito Line (Oyama ‒ Tomobe)	16	50.2				
J	East Japan Railway Company (JR East)		Musashino Line (Fuchū-Honmachi ‒ Nishi-Funabashi)	26	71.8				
J	East Japan Railway Company (JR East)		Nambu Line (Tachikawa ‒ Kawasaki)	26	35.5				
J	East Japan Railway Company (JR East)		Nambu Line Branch (Shitte ‒ Hama-Kawasaki)	4	4.1				
J	East Japan Railway Company (JR East)		Narita Line (Sakura ‒ Narita Airport)	5	23.9				
J	East Japan Railway Company (JR East)		Narita Line (Narita Airport Junction ‒ Matsugishi)	13	60.2				
J	East Japan Railway Company (JR East)		Narita Line (Abiko ‒ Narita)	10	32.9				
J	East Japan Railway Company (JR East)	Keihin–Tōhoku Line	Negishi Line (Yokohama ‒ Ōfuna)	12	22.1				
J	East Japan Railway Company (JR East)		Nikkō Line (Utsunomiya ‒ Nikkō)	7	40.5				
J	East Japan Railway Company (JR East)	Chūō Line (Rapid)	Ōme Line (Tachikawa ‒ Oku-Tama)	25	37.2				
J	East Japan Railway Company (JR East)		Ryōmō Line (Oyama ‒ Shin-Maebashi)	18	84.4				
J	East Japan Railway Company (JR East)		Sagami Line (Chigasaki ‒ Hashimoto)	18	33.3				
J	East Japan Railway Company (JR East)		Saikyō Line (Ōsaki ‒ Ōmiya)	19	36.9				
J	East Japan Railway Company (JR East)		Shin'etsu Main Line (Takasaki ‒ Yokokawa)	8	29.7				
J	East Japan Railway Company (JR East)	Shōnan–Shinjuku Line	Shōnan-Shinjuku Line (Ōmiya ‒ Ikebukuro and Ōsaki ‒ Hebikubo Junction)		28.6				
J	East Japan Railway Company (JR East)		Sōbu Main Line (Chiba ‒ Chōshi)	22	81.3				
J	East Japan Railway Company (JR East)	Yokosuka Line	Sōbu Line (Rapid) (Tōkyō ‒ Chiba)	10	39.2				
J	East Japan Railway Company (JR East)		Sotobō Line (Chiba ‒ Awa-Kamogawa)	27	93.3				
J	East Japan Railway Company (JR East)	Utsunomiya Line	Takasaki Line (Ōmiya ‒ Takasaki)	19	74.7				
J	East Japan Railway Company (JR East)		Tōgane Line (Ōami ‒ Narutō)	5	13.8				
J	East Japan Railway Company (JR East)	Tōkaidō Line (JR East)	Tōkaidō Main Line (Tōkyō ‒ Atami)	21	104.6				
J	East Japan Railway Company (JR East)		Tsurumi Line (Tsurumi ‒ Ōgimachi, Asano ‒ Umi-Shibaura, and Anzen ‒ Ōkawa)	13	9.7				
J	East Japan Railway Company (JR East)		Uchibō Line (Soga ‒ Awa-Kamogawa)	30	119.4				
J	East Japan Railway Company (JR East)		Ueno-Tōkyō Line (Ueno ‒ Tōkyō)	2	3.6				
J	East Japan Railway Company (JR East)		Utsunomiya Line (Ueno ‒ Kuroiso)	33	159.9				
J	East Japan Railway Company (JR East)		Yamanote Line (Shinagawa ‒ Shinagawa)	30	34.5	4,098,582	2015		
J	East Japan Railway Company (JR East)		Yokosuka Line (Tōkyō ‒ Kurihama)	19	73.3				
J	East Japan Railway Company (JR East)		Yokohama Line (Higashi-Kanagawa ‒ Hachiōji)	20	42.6				
J	East Japan Railway Company (JR East)	Total		623	2,282.8				
M	Chiba Urban Monorail		Chiba Urban Monorail Line 1	6	3.2		2009		2010
M	Chiba Urban Monorail		Chiba Urban Monorail Line 2	13	12.0		2009		2010
M	Chiba Urban Monorail	Total		18	15.2	45,571	2009	16,526,000	2010
M	Enoshima Electric Railway	EN	Enoshima Electric Railway Line	15	10.0	42,856	2009		
M	Hokusō Railway		Hokusō Line	15	32.3			37,951,000	2010
M	Kantō Railway		Jōsō Line	25	51.1	26,206	2010	9,458,398	2010
M	Kantō Railway		Ryūgasaki Line	3	4.5	2,400	2010	869,275	2010
M	Kantō Railway	Total		28	55.6	28,606	2010	10,327,673	2010
M	Metropolitan Intercity Railway Company		Tsukuba Express	20	58.3	283,000	2010	102,220,000	2010
M	Saitama New Urban Transit		New Shuttle	13	12.7	43,700	2010	15,719,338	2010
M	Saitama Railway		Saitama Rapid Railway Line	8	14.6	85,100	2010	31,051,286	2010
M	Shonan Monorail		Shōnan Monorail Enoshima Line	8	6.6	27,678	2009	9,949,000	2010
M	Tama Urban Monorail		Tama Urban Monorail	19	16.0	124,678	2010	45,507,620	2010
M	Tokyo Metropolitan Bureau of Transportation		Nippori-Toneri Liner	13	9.7	59,034	2010	21,488,000	2010
M	Tokyo Metropolitan Bureau of Transportation		Toden Arakawa Line	30	12.2	49,517	2010	18,074,000	2010
M	Tokyo Monorail		Tokyo Monorail	11	17.8			45,842,000	2010
M	Tokyo Waterfront Area Rapid Transit (TWR)		Rinkai Line	8	12.2	200,200	2010	73,099,000	2010
M	Tōyō Rapid Railway		Tōyō Rapid Line	9	16.2	133,000	2010	48,054,000	2010
M	Utsunomiya Light Rail		Utsunomiya Haga Light Rail Line	19	14.6				
M	Yokohama New Transit		Kanazawa Seaside Line	14	10.6	47,542	2011	17,228,408	2011
M	Yurikamome		Yurikamome	16	14.7			31,794,000	2010
O	Chichibu Railway		Chichibu Main Line	35	71.7			8,070,000	2011
O	Chōshi Electric Railway		Chōshi Electric Railway Line	10	6.4	1,952	2009	712,255	2009
O	Fuji Kyuko		Fujikyuko Line	18	26.6			2,947,110	2009
O	Hakone Tozan Railway		Hakone Tozan Line	11	15.0	22,408	2009	15,908,872	2010
O	Hitachinaka Kaihin Railway		Minato Line	9	14.3			786,210	2010
O	Isumi Railway		Isumi Line	14	26.8	1,111	2009	405,669	2009
O	Izuhakone Railway		Izuhakone Railway Daiyūzan Line	12	9.6	20,895	2010		
O	Izukyū Corporation		Izu Kyūkō Line	16	45.7			5,114,496	2010
O	Jōmō Electric Railway		Jōmō Line	23	25.4			1,619,915	2009
O	Jōshin Electric Railway		Jōshin Dentetsu Jōshin Line	20	33.7			2,210,000	2009
O	Kashima Rinkai Railway		Ōarai Kashima Line	15	53.0			2,374,000	2009
O	Kominato Railway		Kominato Line	18	39.1	3,807	2010		
O	Maihama Resort Line		Disney Resort Line	4	5.0	45,754	2009		
O	Mooka Railway		Mooka Railway Mooka Line	17	41.9			1,065,190	2010
O	Ryutetsu		Ryutetsu Nagareyama Line	6	5.7	7,961	2010	2,905,649	2010
O	Shibayama Railway		Shibayama Railway Line	2	2.2	2,048	2010	747,677	2010
O	Watarase Keikoku Railway		Watarase Keikoku Line	17	44.1			488,795	2009
O	Yagan Railway		Yagan Railway Aizu Kinugawa Line	9	30.7			489,385	2009
O	Yamaman		Yamaman Yūkarigaoka Line	6	5.0	1,763	2009		

== See also ==
- Rail transport in Japan
- List of railway companies in Japan
- List of railway lines in Japan
- List of railway stations in Japan
- List of through trains in Japan
