= Yunoki Station =

Yunoki Station (柚木駅) is the name of two train stations in Japan:

- Yunoki Station (Shizuoka, Shizuoka)
- Yunoki Station (Fuji, Shizuoka)
