= Tatebori Station =

Railway station in Fuji, Shizuoka Prefecture, Japan

CC02 Tatebori Station 竪堀駅
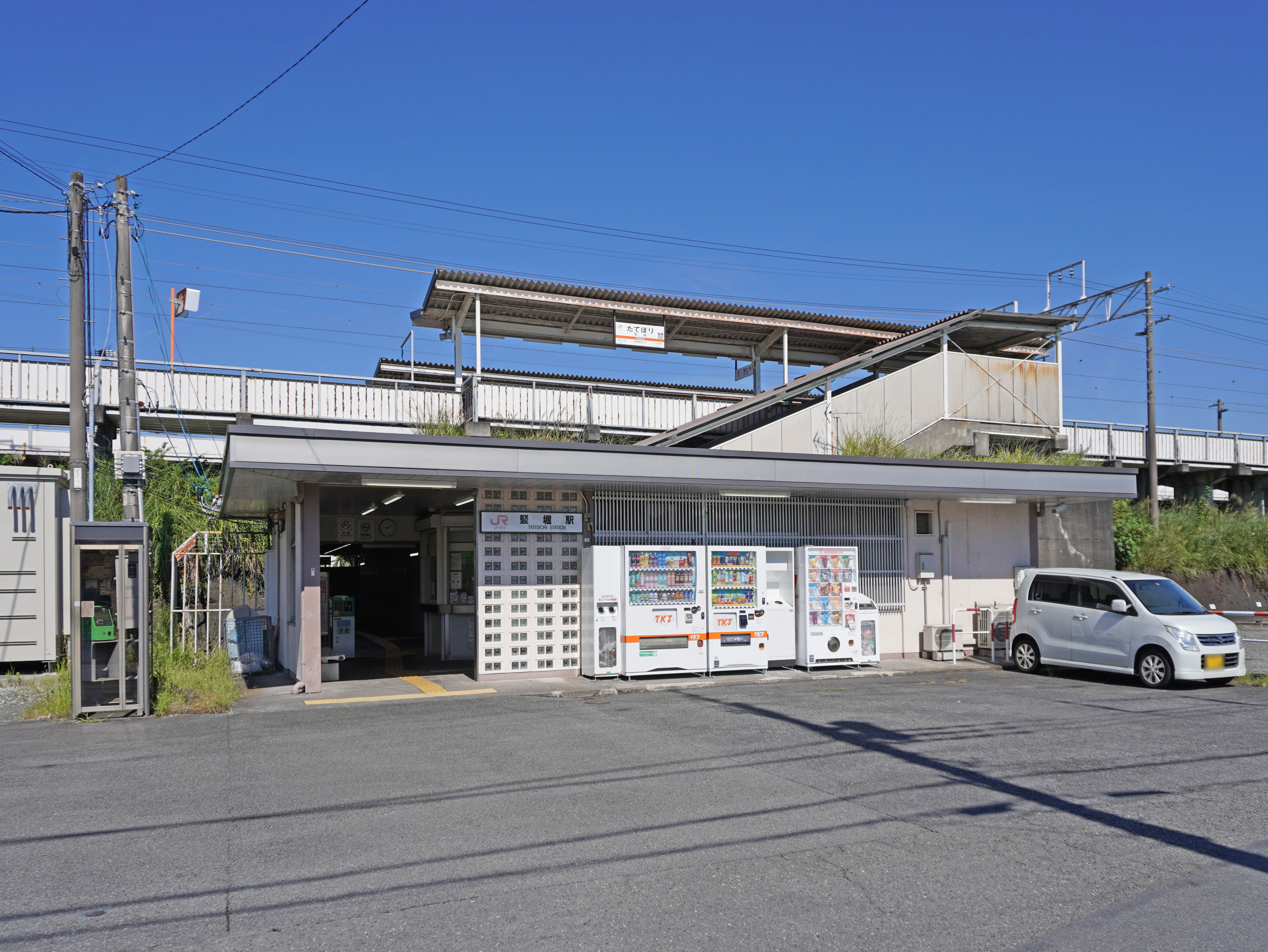
- Tatebori Station in September 2022

General information
- Location: Nakajima 3, Fuji-shi, Shizuoka-ken; Japan
- Coordinates: 35°10′5″N 138°38′45″E
- Operator: JR Central
- Line: Minobu Line
- Distance: 2.8 kilometers from Fuji
- Platforms: 1 island platform

Construction
- Accessible: None

Other information
- Status: Staffed

History
- Opened: November 5, 1927

Passengers
- FY2017: 1078 daily
Location
- Location within Shizuoka Prefecture Location within Japan

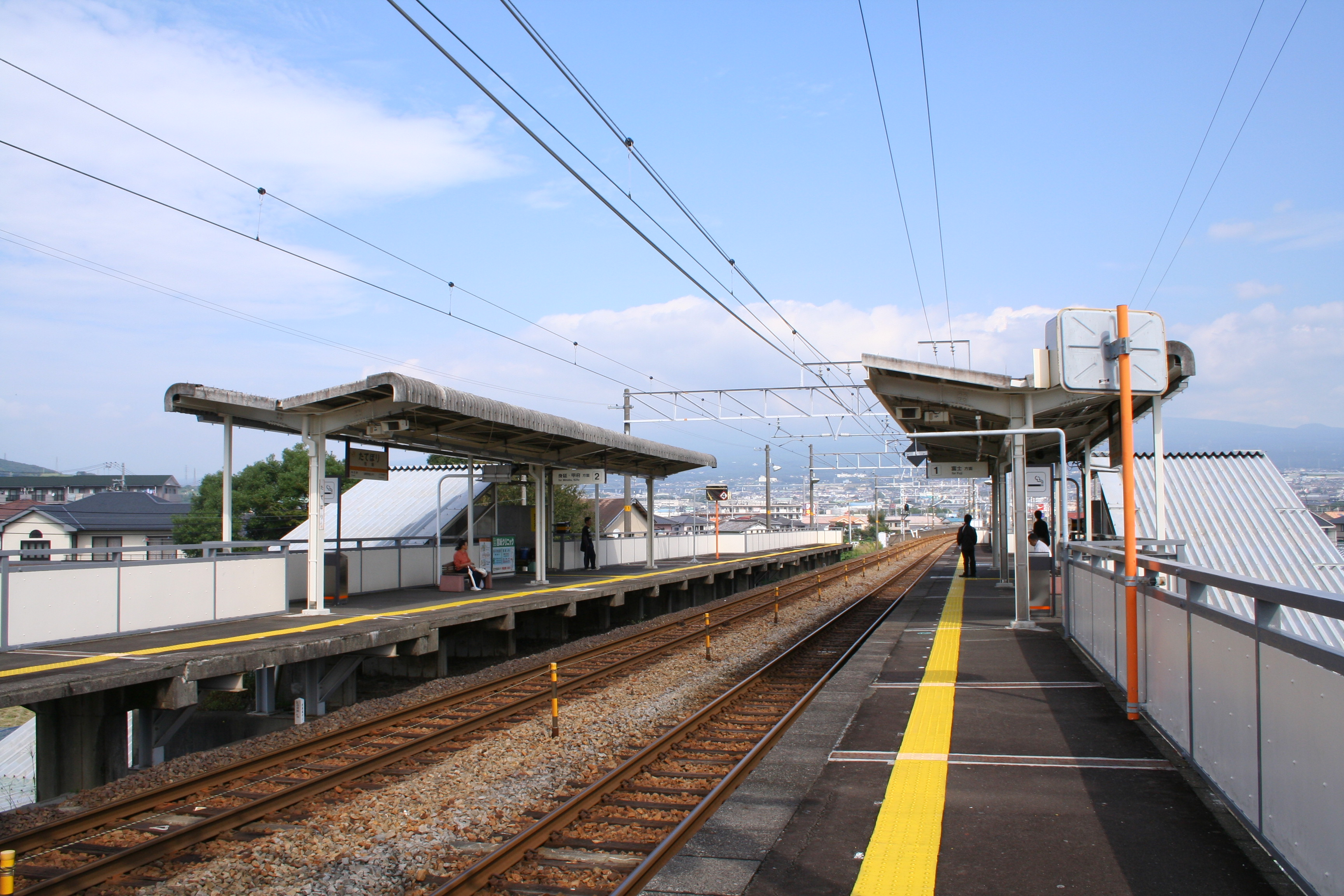
Platform

Tatebori Station (竪堀駅, Tatebori-eki) is a railway station on the Minobu Line of Central Japan Railway Company (JR Central) located in the city of Fuji, Shizuoka Prefecture, Japan.

== Lines ==
Tatebori Station is served by the Minobu Line and is located 2.8 kilometers from the southern terminus of the line at Fuji Station.

== Layout ==
Tatebori Station consists of elevated dual opposing side platforms. The ground-level station building has automated ticket machines, automated turnstiles and a staffed service counter.

=== Platform ===
| 1 | ■ Minobu Line | For Fujinomiya, Minobu, Kōfu |
| 2 | ■ Minobu Line | For Fuji |

== Adjacent stations ==
| « | Service | » |
Minobu Line
Limited Express Fujikawa: Does not stop at this station
| Yunoki | Local | Iriyamase |

== History ==
Tatebori Station was opened on March 8, 1926 as the Tatehori Signal Depot (竪堀停留場, Tatehori singoba). It was elevated to full station status on November 5, 1927 for both passenger and freight services. When the Minobu Line was leased to the national government from October 1, 1938, the station was renamed “Tatebori”. It came under control of the Japanese Government Railways (JGR) on May 1, 1941. The JGR become the JNR (Japan National Railways) after World War II. Freight services were discontinued in 1969. The same year, the tracks from Fuji to Tatebori were double tracked, and the Tatebori Station building was demolished and relocated 400 meters to the east of its former site. Along with its division and privatization of JNR on April 1, 1987, the station came under the control and operation of the Central Japan Railway Company.

Station numbering was introduced to the Minobu Line in March 2018; Tatebori Station was assigned station number CC02.

== Passenger statistics ==
In fiscal 2017, the station was used by an average of 1078 passengers daily (boarding passengers only).

== Surrounding area ==
- Fuji High School

== See also ==
- List of railway stations in Japan
