= Gendōji Station =

Railway station in Fujinomiya, Shizuoka Prefecture, Japan

CC05 Gendōji Station 源道寺駅
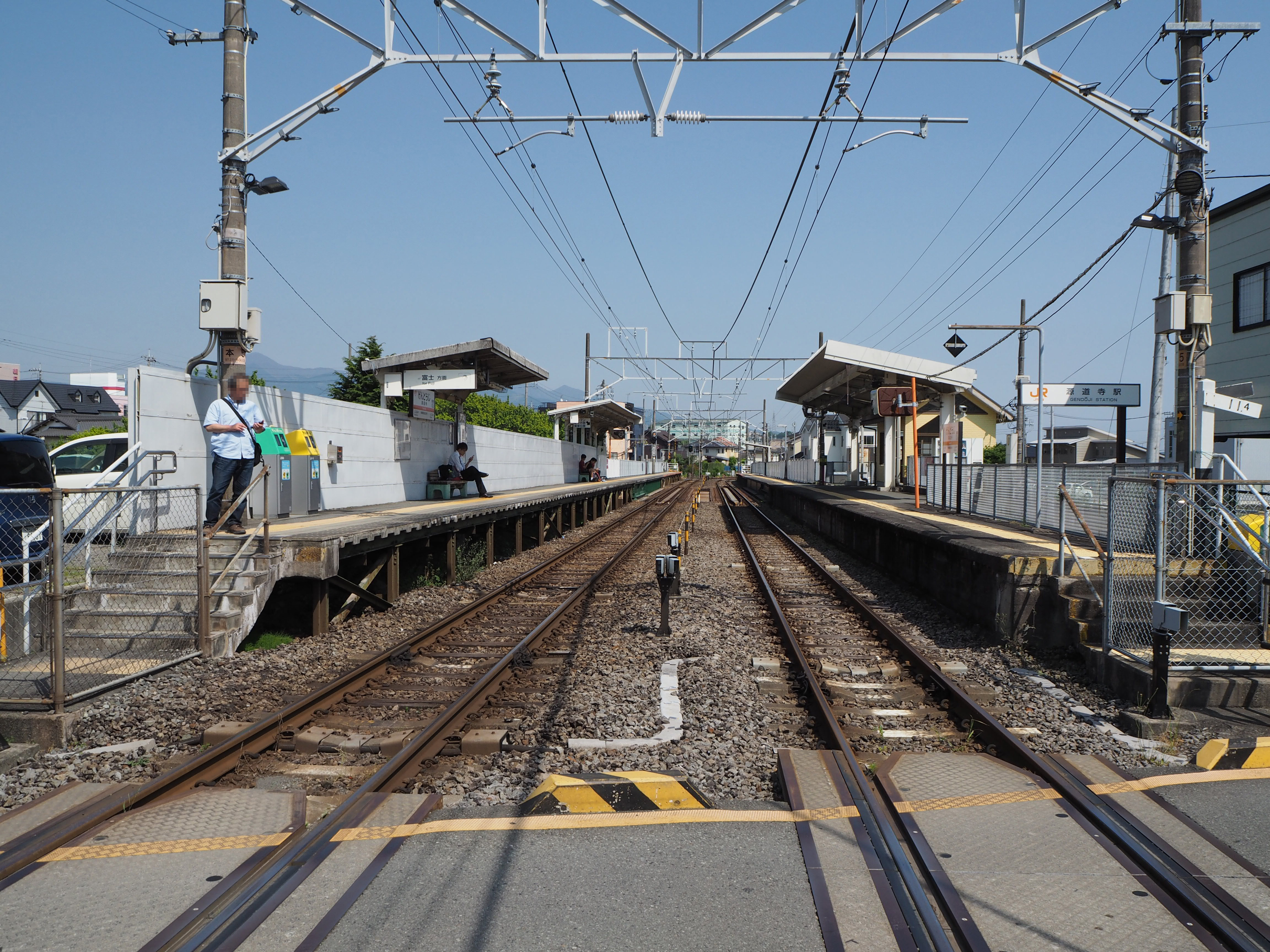
- Gendōji Station in April 2018

General information
- Location: Gendōji-cho, Fujinomiya-shi, Shizuoka-ken; Japan
- Coordinates: 35°12′52″N 138°37′38″E
- Operator: JR Central
- Line: Minobu Line
- Distance: 9.3 kilometers from Fuji
- Platforms: 2 side platforms

Other information
- Status: Unstaffed

History
- Opened: October 1, 1938

Passengers
- FY2017: 823 daily
Location
- Location within Shizuoka Prefecture Location within Japan

Gendōji Station (源道寺駅, Gendōji-eki) is a railway station on the Minobu Line of Central Japan Railway Company (JR Central) located in the city of Fujinomiya, Shizuoka Prefecture, Japan.

== Lines ==
Gendōji Station is served by the Minobu Line and is located 9.3 kilometers from the southern terminus of the line at Fuji Station.

== Layout ==
Gendōji Station has two opposed ground-level island platforms serving two tracks connected by a level crossing at the end of the platforms. The station building has automated ticket machines, automated turnstiles and is unattended.

=== Platforms ===
1	■ Minobu Line	For Fujinomiya, Minobu, Kōfu
2	■ Minobu Line	For Fuji

== Adjacent stations ==
«	Service	»
Minobu Line
Limited Express Fujikawa: Does not stop at this station
Fujine	Local	Fujinomiya

== History ==
Gendōji Station began as Gendōji Signaling Depot (源道寺停留場, Gendōji singoba) on December 25, 1930, as part of the original Minobu Line. When the line was leased to the national government from October 1, 1938, it was elevated to Gendōji Station for both passenger and freight services. It came under control of the Japanese Government Railways (JGR) on May 1, 1941. The JGR became the JNR (Japan National Railway) after the end of World War II. Freight services were discontinued in 1971, the same year that the tracks from Fuji to Fujinomiya were expanded to a double track system. Along with the division and privatization of JNR on April 1, 1987, the station came under the control and operation of the Central Japan Railway Company.

Station numbering was introduced to the Minobu Line in March 2018; Gendōji Station was assigned station number CC05.

== Passenger statistics ==
In fiscal 2017, the station was used by an average of 823 passengers daily (boarding passengers only).

== Surrounding area ==
The station is located in a suburban residential area of Fujinomiya.

== See also ==
- List of railway stations in Japan
