= Yunoki Station (Fuji) =

Railway station in Fuji, Shizuoka Prefecture, Japan

CC01 Yunoki Station 柚木駅
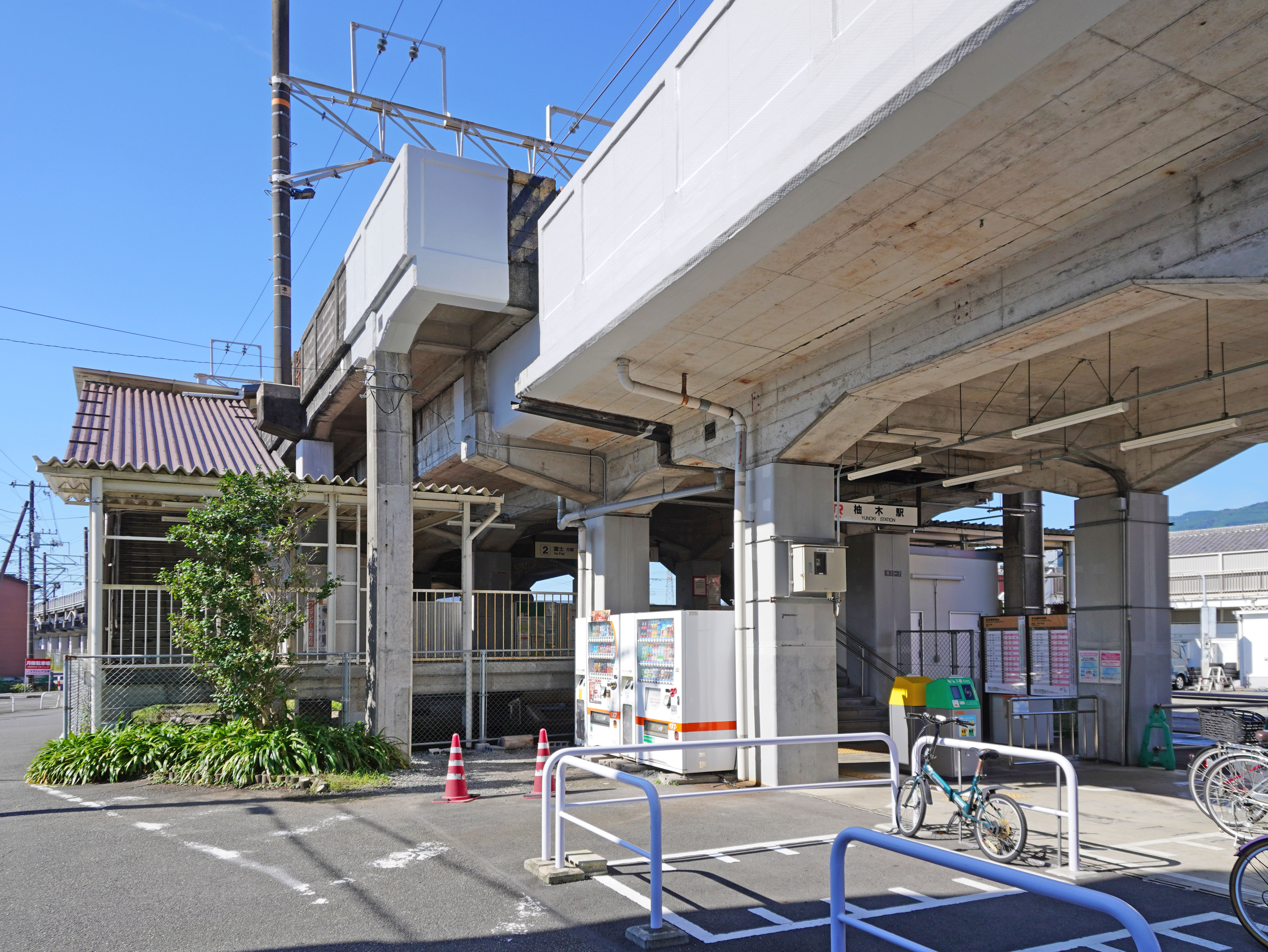
- Yunoki Station in September 2022

General information
- Location: Yunoki 213, Fuji-shi, Shizuoka-ken; Japan
- Coordinates: 35°9′26″N 138°38′21″E
- Operator: JR Central
- Line: Minobu Line
- Distance: 2.8 kilometers from Fuji
- Platforms: 1 island platform

Construction
- Structure type: Elevated
- Cycle facilities: Yes
- Accessible: None

Other information
- Status: Unstaffed
- Station code: CC01

History
- Opened: October 1, 1938
- Former names: Motoichiba (to 1961)

Passengers
- FY2017: 437 daily
Location
- Location within Shizuoka Prefecture Location within Japan

Yunoki Station (柚木駅, Yunoki-eki) is a railway station on the Minobu Line of Central Japan Railway Company (JR Central) located in the city of Fuji, Shizuoka Prefecture, Japan.

== Lines ==
Yunoki Station is served by the Minobu Line and is located 1.5 kilometers from the southern terminus of the line at Fuji Station.

== Layout ==
Yunoki Station consists of dual opposing elevated side platforms. The unstaffed station building is located underneath the platforms, and has automated ticket machines and automated turnstiles.

=== Platform ===
1	■ Minobu Line	For Fujinomiya, Minobu, Kōfu
2	■ Minobu Line	For Fuji

== Adjacent stations ==
«	Service	»
Minobu Line
Limited Express Fujikawa: Does not stop at this station
Fuji	Local	Tatebori

== History ==
Yunoki Station was opened on July 1, 1931, as the Motoichiba Signal Depot (本市場停留場, Motoichiba Singoba). It was elevated to full station status as the Motoichiba Station (本市場駅, Motoichiba-eki) on October 1, 1938, when the Minobu Line was leased to the national government. It came under control of the Japanese Government Railways (JGR) on May 1, 1941. The JGR became the Japan National Railway (JNR) after World War II. In September 1961, the tracks from Fuji to Tatebori were double tracked, and the Motoichi Station building was demolished and relocated 1.5 kilometers to the east of its former site, at which time it was given its present name. Along with its division and privatization of JNR on April 1, 1987, the station came under the control and operation of the Central Japan Railway Company.

Station numbering was introduced to the Minobu Line in March 2018; Yunoki Station was assigned station number CC01.

== Passenger statistics ==
In fiscal 2017, the station was used by an average of 437 passengers daily (boarding passengers only).

== Surrounding area ==
- Fujimi Junior High School
- Fujimi High School

== See also ==
- List of railway stations in Japan
