= Fujine Station =

Fujine Station is the name of multiple train stations in Japan.

- Fujine Station (Iwate) - (藤根駅) in Iwate Prefecture
- Fujine Station (Shizuoka) - (富士根駅) in Shizuoka Prefecture
