= Numakubo Station =

Railway station in Fujinomiya, Shizuoka Prefecture, Japan

Numakubo Station 沼久保駅
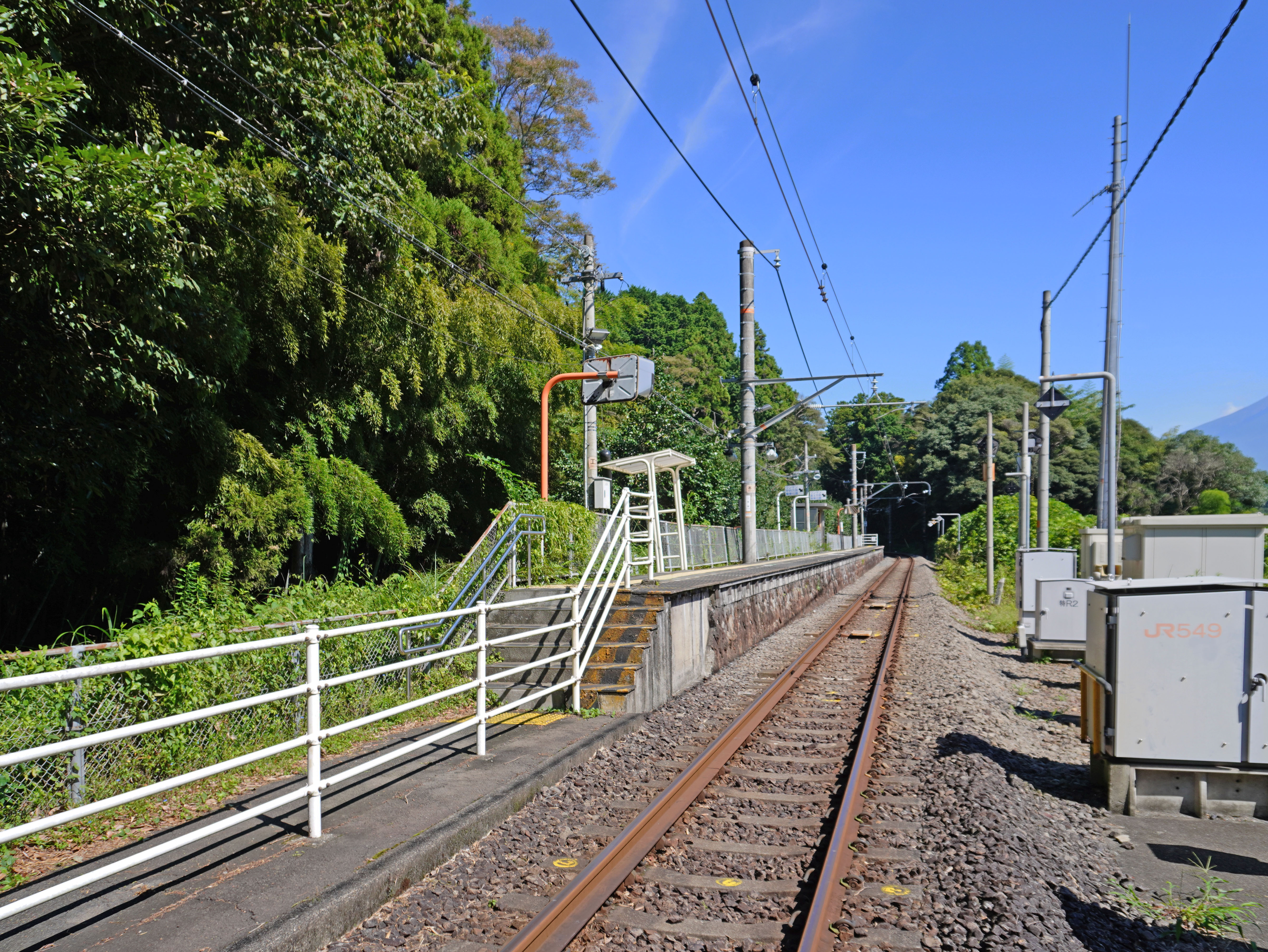
- Numakubo Station in September 2022

General information
- Location: 1065 Numakubo, Fujinomiya-shi, Shizuoka-ken; Japan
- Coordinates: 35°11′58″N 138°35′04″E
- Operator: JR Central
- Line: Minobu Line
- Distance: 16.9 kilometers from Fuji
- Platforms: 1 side platform

Other information
- Status: Unstaffed

History
- Opened: August 15, 1929

Passengers
- FY2017: 6 daily
Location
- Location within Shizuoka Prefecture Location within Japan

Numakubo Station (沼久保駅, Numakubo-eki) is a railway station on the Minobu Line of Central Japan Railway Company (JR Central) located in the city of Fujinomiya, Shizuoka Prefecture, Japan. The station is noted for its view of Mount Fuji, which has inspired a number of poets. Opposite the station is a stone monument with a poem by Kyoshi Takahama, composed on this location.

== Lines ==
Numakubo Station is served by the Minobu Line and is located 16.9 kilometers from the southern terminus of the line at Fuji Station.

== Layout ==
Numakubo Station has one side platform serving a single bi-directional track. The platform has a small wooden shelter, but there is no station building. The station is unattended and has automated ticket machines and an automated turnstile.

== Adjacent stations ==
«	Service	»
Minobu Line
Limited Express Fujikawa: Does not stop at this station
Nishi-Fujinomiya	Local	Shibakawa

== History ==
Numakubo Station was opened on August 15, 1929 as part of the original Minobu Line. It came under control of the Japanese Government Railways (JGR) on May 1, 1941. The JGR became the Japan National Railway (JNR) after the end of World War II. Along with the division and privatization of JNR on April 1, 1987, the station came under the control and operation of the Central Japan Railway Company.

== Passenger statistics ==
In fiscal 2017, the station was used by an average of 7 passengers daily (boarding passengers only).

== Surrounding area ==
- Fuji River

== See also ==
- List of railway stations in Japan
