= Nishi-Fujinomiya Station =

Railway station in Fujinomiya, Shizuoka Prefecture, Japan

CC07 Nishi-Fujinomiya Station 西富士宮駅
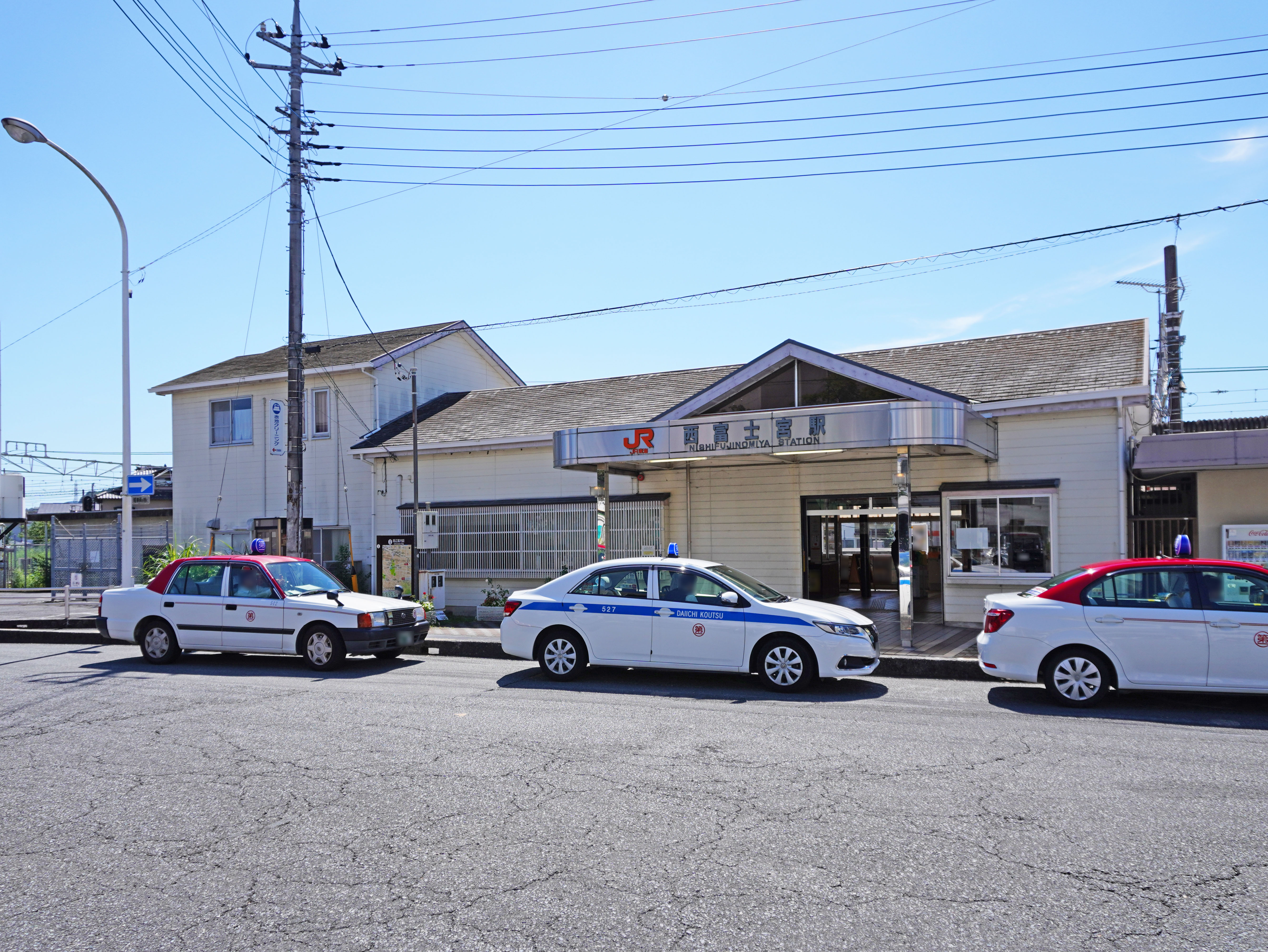
- Nishi-Fujinomiya Station in September 2022

General information
- Location: Kibune-cho 1, Fujinomiya-shi, Shizuoka-ken; Japan
- Coordinates: 35°13′33″N 138°36′9″E
- Operator: JR Central
- Line: Minobu Line
- Distance: 11.9 kilometers from Fuji
- Platforms: 1 island platform

Other information
- Status: Staffed

History
- Opened: July 15, 1927
- Former names: Ōmiya-Nishimachi (to 1942)

Passengers
- FY2017: 1233 daily
Location
- Location within Shizuoka Prefecture Location within Japan

Nishi-Fujinomiya Station (西富士宮駅, Nishi-Fujinomiya-eki) is a railway station on the Minobu Line of Central Japan Railway Company (JR Central) located in the city of Fujinomiya, Shizuoka Prefecture, Japan.

== Lines ==
Nishi-Fujinomiya Station is served by the Minobu Line and is located 11.9 kilometers from the southern terminus of the line at Fuji Station.

== Layout ==
Nishi-Fujinomiya Station consists of a single island platform serving two tracks, with a third track on a headshunt to permit passage of express trains. The station is attended.

=== Platforms ===
1	■ Minobu Line	For Fujinomiya, Fuji
2	■ Minobu Line	For Shibakawa, Minobu, Kōfu

== Adjacent stations ==
«	Service	»
Minobu Line
Limited Express Fujikawa: Does not stop at this station
Fujinomiya	Local	Numakubo

== History ==
Nishi-Fujinomiya Station was opened on July 15, 1927, as part of the original Minobu Line under the name of Ōmiya-Nishimachi Station (大宮西町駅, Ōmiya-Nishimachi-eki). It came under control of the Japanese Government Railways (JGR) on May 1, 1941, and on October 1, 1942, its name was changed to the present name. The JGR became the JNR (Japan National Railway) after World War II. Along with the division and privatization of JNR on April 1, 1987, the station came under the control and operation of the Central Japan Railway Company. Services by the limited express Fujikawa ceased from October 1, 1995.

Station numbering was introduced to the Minobu Line in March 2018; Nishi-Fujinomiya Station was assigned station number CC07.

== Passenger statistics ==
In fiscal 2017, the station was used by an average of 1233 passengers daily (boarding passengers only).

== Surrounding area ==
- Fujisan Hongū Sengen Taisha Nishi-Fujinomiya is the station nearest to the Sengen Taisha
- Shiraito Falls
- Asagiri Plateau
- Lake Tanuki

== See also ==
- List of railway stations in Japan
