= Shibakawa Station =

Railway station in Fujinomiya, Shizuoka Prefecture, Japan

Shibakawa Station 芝川駅
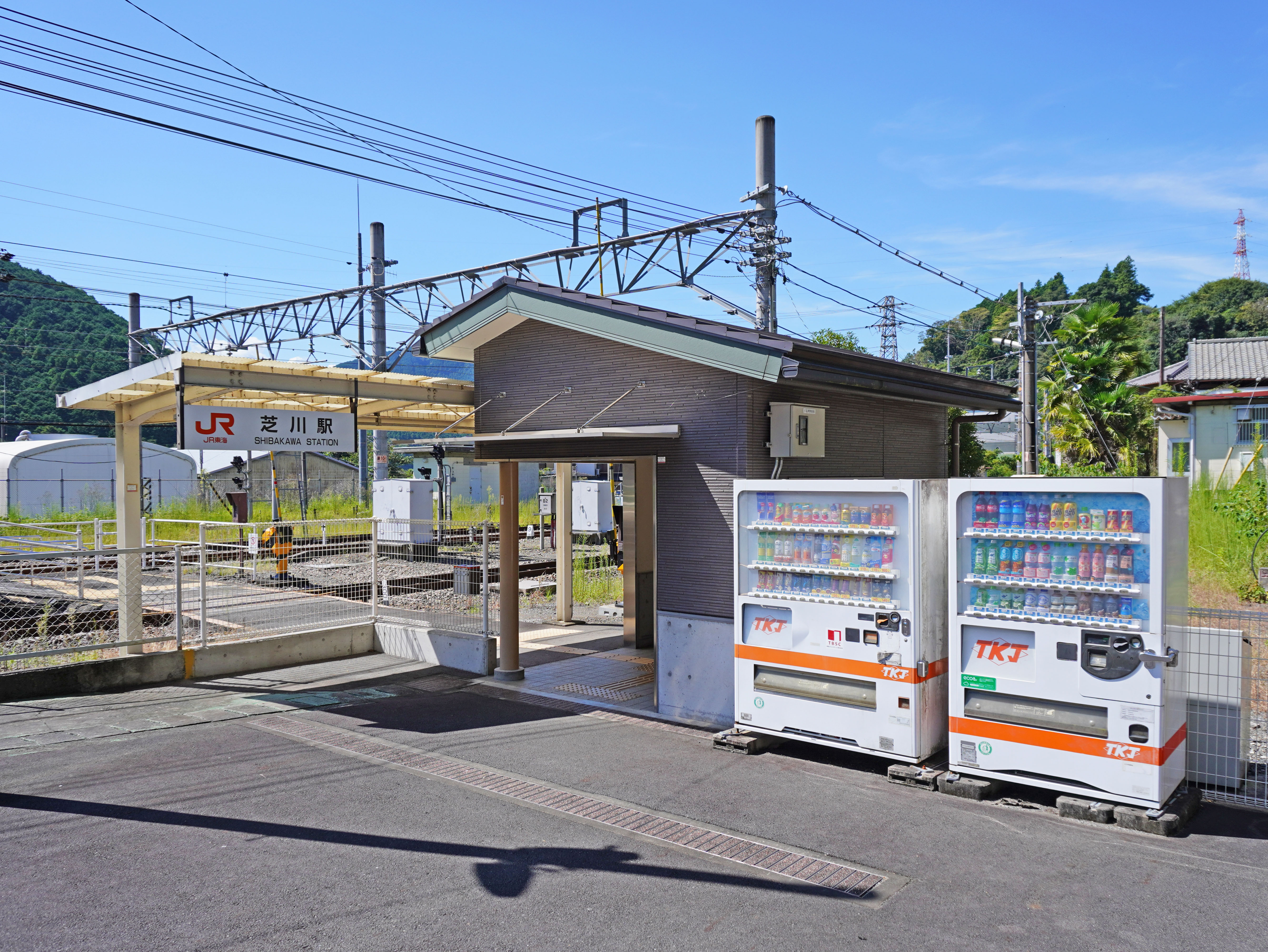
- Shibakawa Station, September 2022

General information
- Location: Shibakawa-chō Habuna, Fujinomiya-shi, Shizuoka-ken; Japan
- Coordinates: 35°11′52″N 138°33′50″E
- Operator: JR Central
- Line: Minobu Line
- Distance: 19.2 kilometers from Fuji
- Platforms: 1 island platform

Other information
- Status: Unstaffed

History
- Opened: March 1, 1915

Passengers
- FY2017: 159 daily
Location
- Location within Shizuoka Prefecture Location within Japan

Shibakawa Station (芝川駅, Shibakawa-eki) is a railway station on the Minobu Line of Central Japan Railway Company (JR Central) located in the city of Fujinomiya, Shizuoka Prefecture, Japan. It is located next to a large factory of the Oji Specialty Paper Co., Ltd.

== Lines ==
Shibakawa Station is served by the Minobu Line and is located 19.2 kilometers from the southern terminus of the line at Fuji Station.

== Layout ==
Shibakawa Station has one island platform serving two tracks, with a third track on a headshunt to permit passage of express trains. The station building has automated ticket machines, automated turnstiles and is unstaffed.

=== Platforms ===
1	■ Minobu Line	For Fujinomiya, Fuji
2	■ Minobu Line	For Minobu, Kōfu

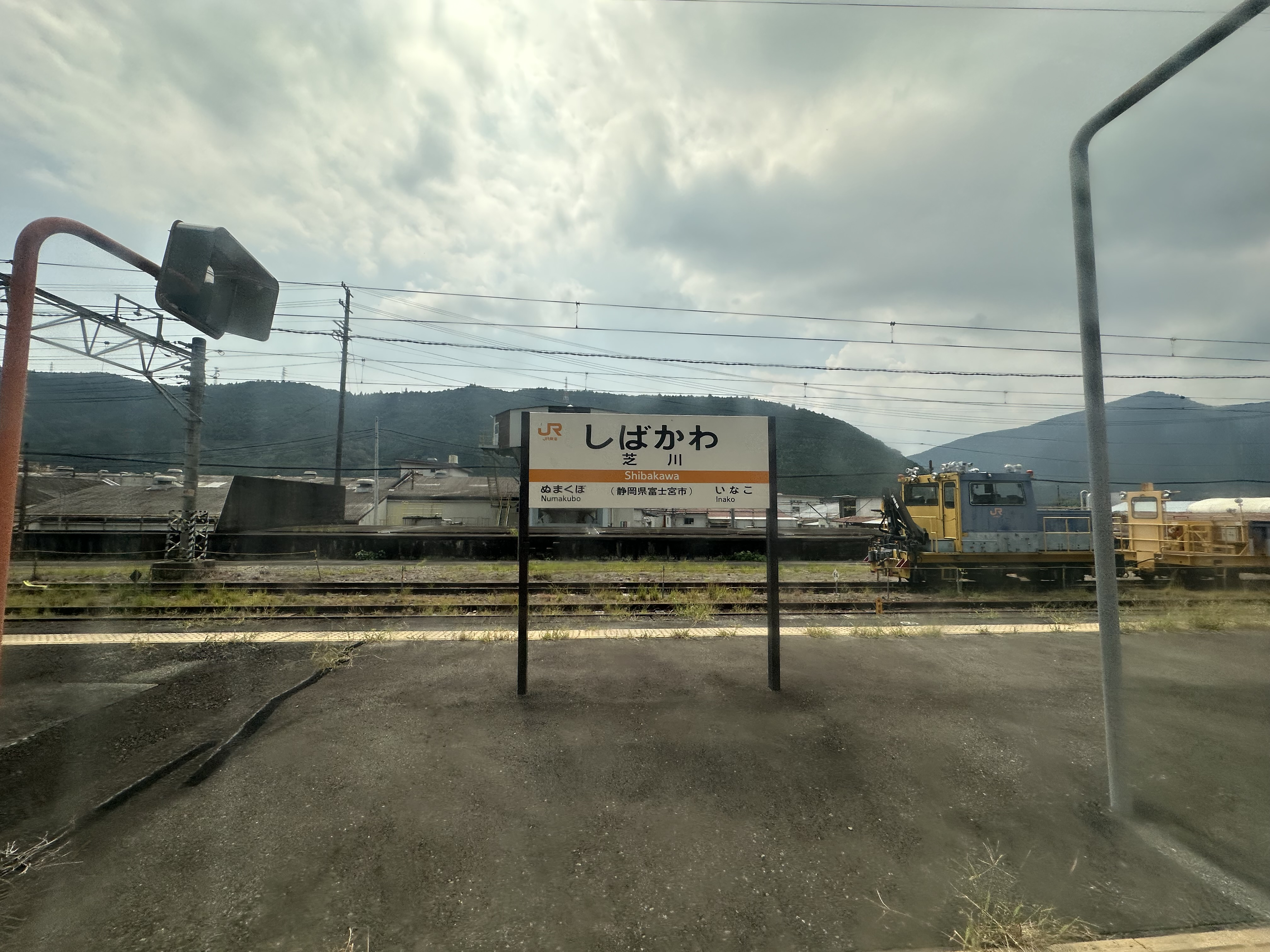

== Adjacent stations ==
«	Service	»
Minobu Line
Limited Express Fujikawa: Does not stop at this station
Numakubo	Local	Inako

== History ==
Shibakawa Station was opened on March 1, 1915, as a terminal station of the original Fuji-Minobu Line for both passenger and freight services. The line was extended past Shibukawa by 1918. It came under control of the Japanese Government Railways on May 1, 1941. The JGR became the JNR (Japan National Railway) after World War II. Along with the division and privatization of JNR on April 1, 1987, the station came under the control and operation of the Central Japan Railway Company. Operations by the limited express Fujikawa were discontinued in 1995. From 1998, the station building has been unattended. A new station building was completed in 2012.

== Passenger statistics ==
In fiscal 2017, the station was used by an average of 159 passengers daily (boarding passengers only).

== Surrounding area ==
- Fuji River

== See also ==
- List of railway stations in Japan
