= Fujinomiya Station =

Railway station in Fujinomiya, Shizuoka Prefecture, Japan

CC06 Fujinomiya Station 富士宮駅
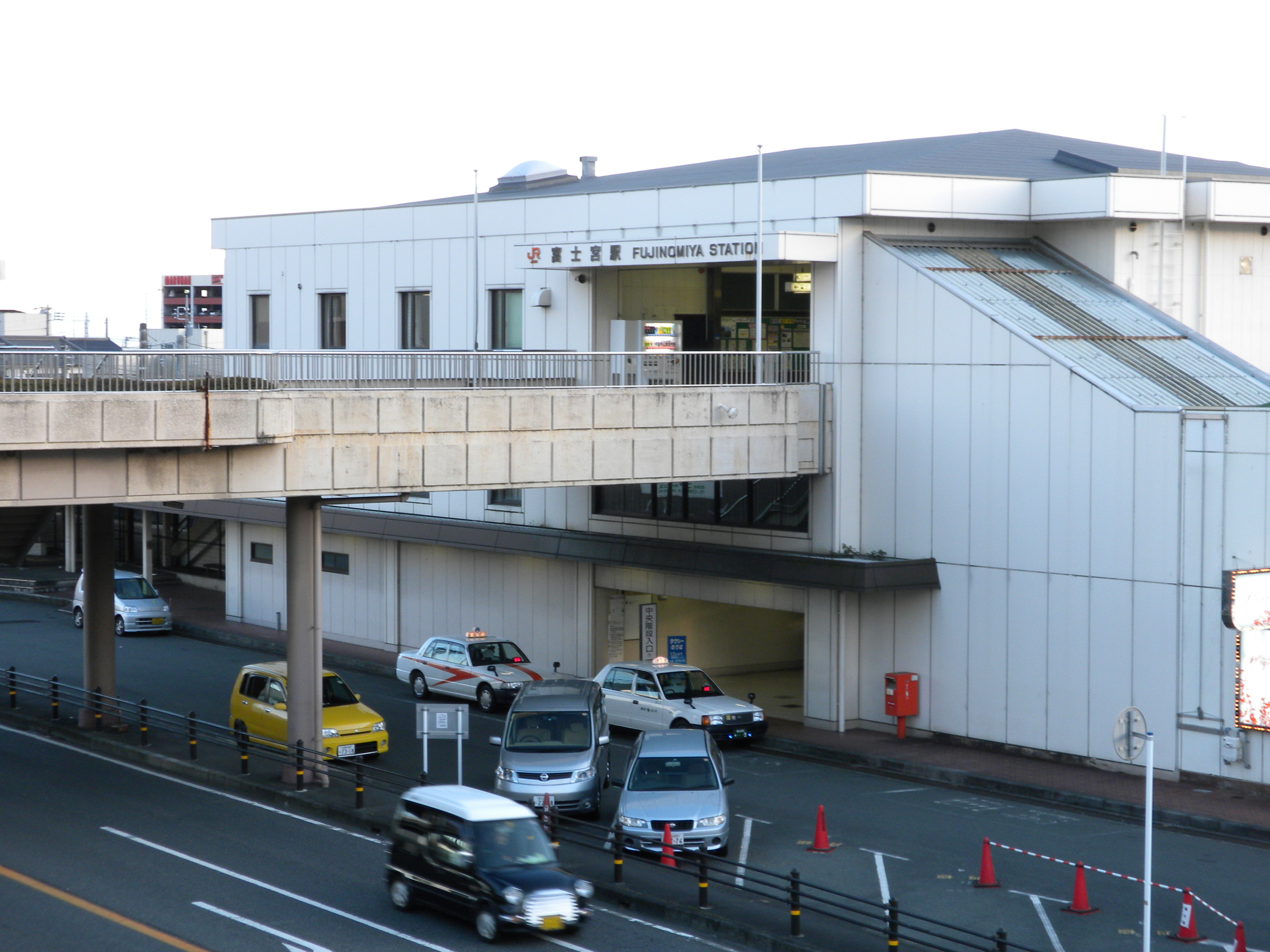
- JR Fujinomiya Station

General information
- Location: 16 Chuo-machi, Fujinomiya-shi, Shizuoka-ken; Japan
- Coordinates: 35°13′17″N 138°36′55″E
- Operator: JR Central
- Line: Minobu Line
- Distance: 10.7 kilometers from Fuji
- Platforms: 1 side + 1 island platform

Construction
- Structure type: Ground level
- Accessible: Yes

Other information
- Status: Staffed

History
- Opened: July 20, 1913
- Former names: Ōmiya (until 1942)

Passengers
- FY2017: 2401 daily

Services
| Preceding station | JR Central | Following station |
|---|---|---|
| Utsubuna towards Kōfu | Fujikawa | Fuji CC00 towards Shizuoka |
| Nishi-Fujinomiya CC07 towards Kōfu | Minobu Line Local | Gendōji CC05 towards Fuji |
Location
- Location within Shizuoka Prefecture Location within Japan

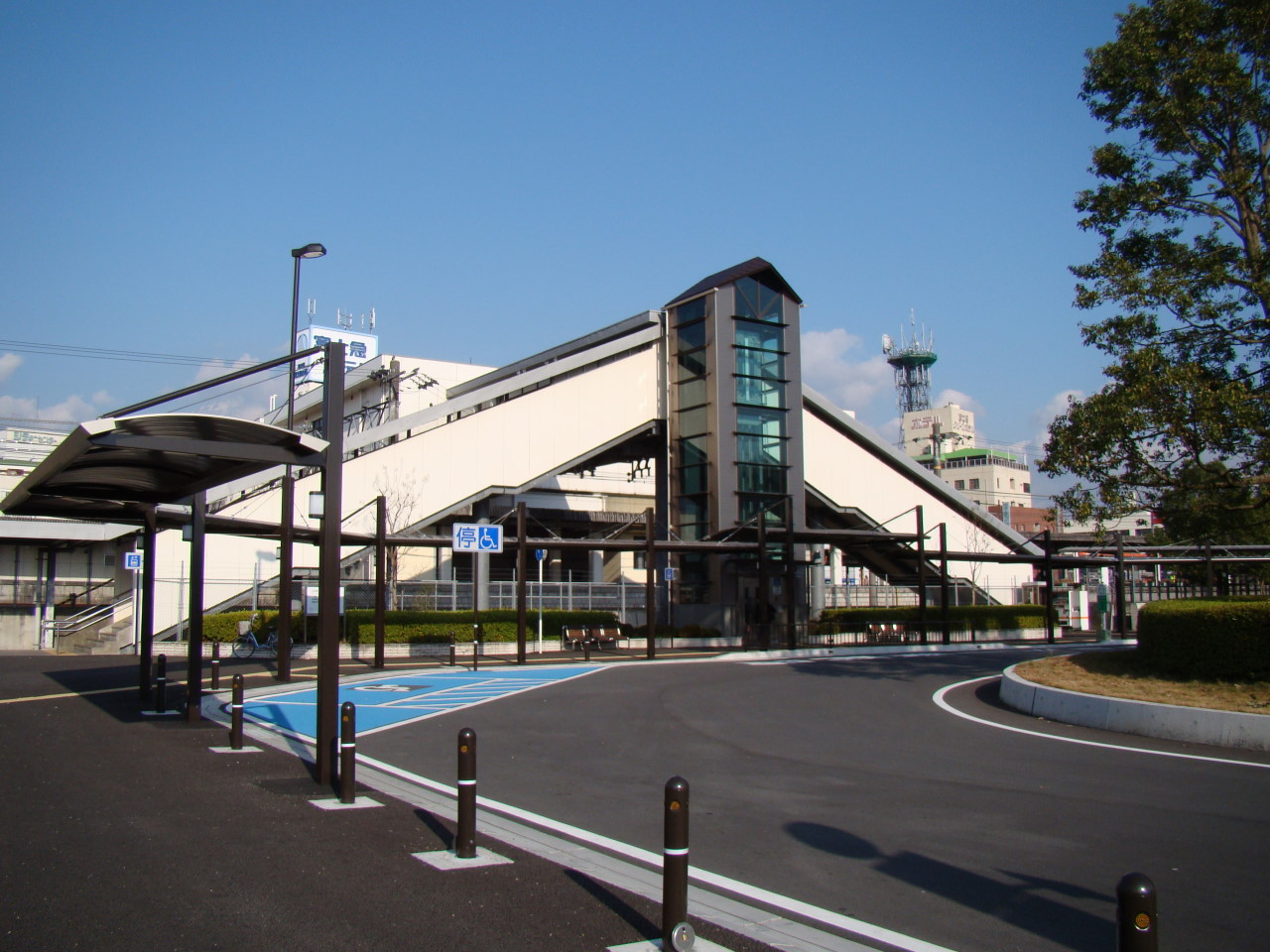
Fujinomiya Station south exit

Fujinomiya Station (富士宮駅, Fujinomiya-eki) is a railway station on the Minobu Line of Central Japan Railway Company (JR Central) located in the city of Fujinomiya, Shizuoka Prefecture, Japan. It is approximately at the mid-way point of the Minobu Line within Shizuoka Prefecture.

== Lines ==
Fujinomiya Station is served by the Minobu Line and is located 10.7 kilometers from the southern terminus of the line at Fuji Station.

== Layout ==
Fujinomiya Station consists of a single side platform serving Track 1, which is an auxiliary platform used primarily for chartered trains by the Soka Gakkai organization, and a single island platform for Track 2 and Track 3, which handle regularly scheduled services. The station building is elevated above the platforms. The station is staffed.

=== Platforms ===
| 2 | ■ Minobu Line | For Fuji, Shizuoka |
| 3 | ■ Minobu Line | For Nishi-Fujinomiya, Minobu, Kōfu |

== History ==
Fujinomiya Station was opened on July 20, 1913 as part of the original Minobu Line under the name of Ōmiya Station (大宮駅). It came under control of the Japan National Railway on May 1, 1941 and on October 1, 1942 its name was changed to the present name. The station building was rebuilt in 1983. Along with the division and privatization of JNR on April 1, 1987, the station came under the control and operation of the Central Japan Railway Company. The station was remodeled in 2007 to allow for barrier free access.

Station numbering was introduced to the Minobu Line in March 2018; Fujinomiya Station was assigned station number CC06.

== Passenger statistics ==
In fiscal 2015, the station was used by an average of 2,401 passengers daily (boarding passengers only).

== Surrounding area ==
- Fujinomiya City Hall
- Fujisan Hongū Sengen Taisha

== See also ==
- List of railway stations in Japan
