= Iriyamase Station =

Railway station in Fuji, Shizuoka Prefecture, Japan

CC03 Iriyamase Station 入山瀬駅
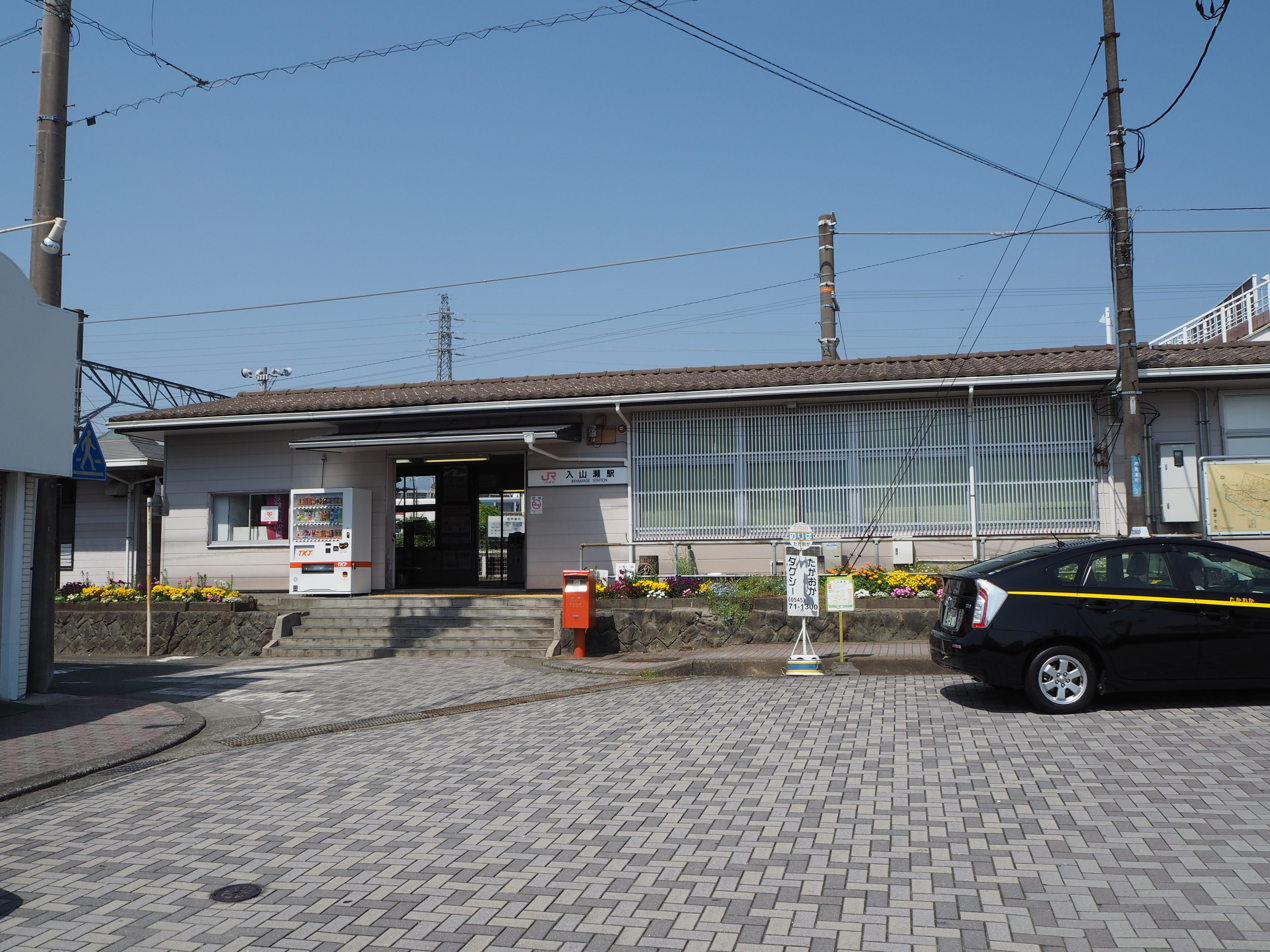
- JR Iriyamase Station in April 2018

General information
- Location: Takaoka-Honcho 1-1, Fuji-shi, Shizuoka-ken; Japan
- Coordinates: 35°11′18″N 138°38′52″E
- Operator: JR Central
- Line: Minobu Line
- Distance: 5.6 kilometers from Fuji
- Platforms: 1 island platform

Other information
- Status: Staffed

History
- Opened: July 20, 1913

Passengers
- FY2017: 925 daily
Location
- Location within Shizuoka Prefecture Location within Japan

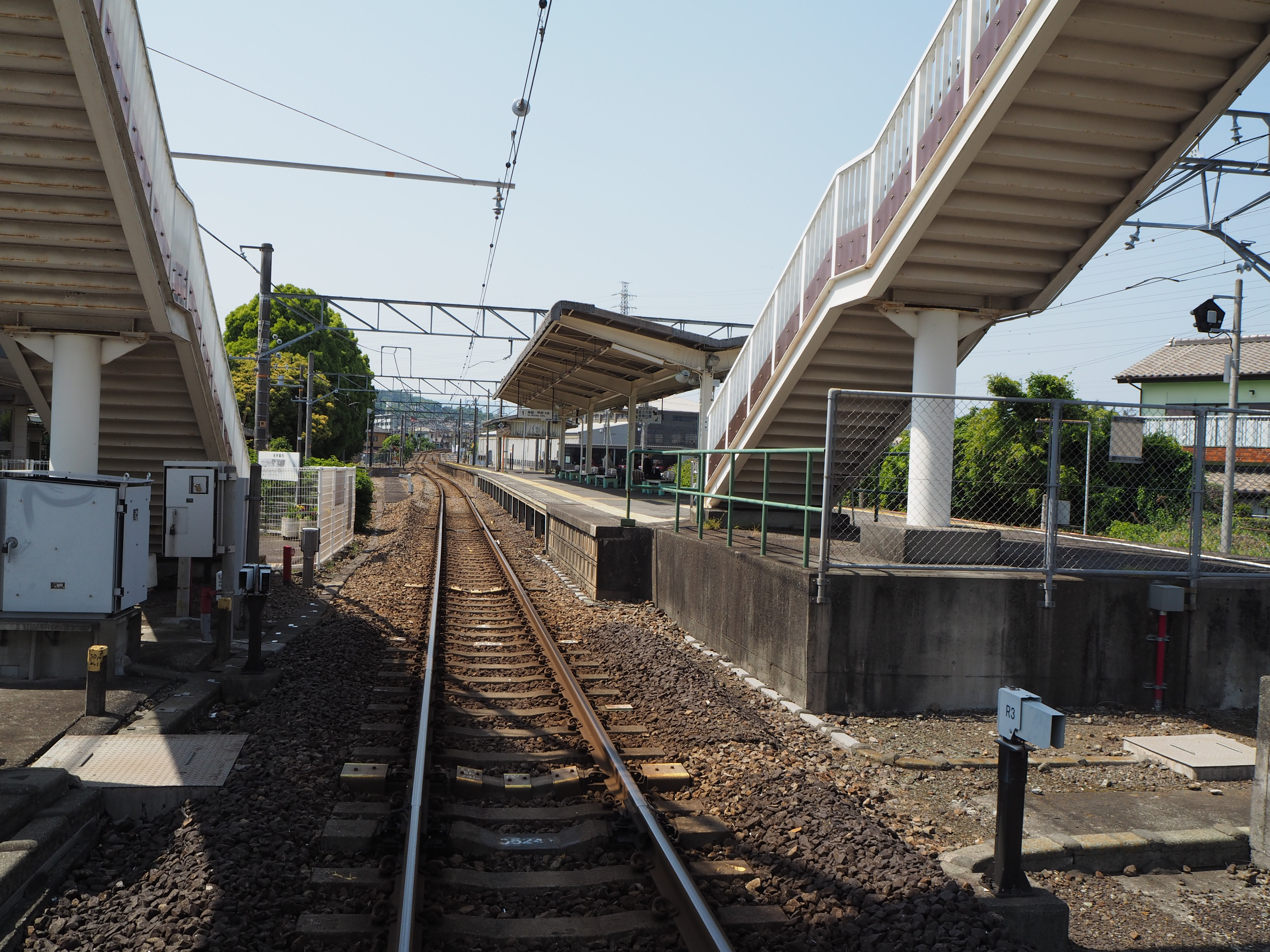
Platform

Iriyamase Station (入山瀬駅, Iriyamase-eki) is a railway station on the Minobu Line of Central Japan Railway Company (JR Central) located in the city of Fuji, Shizuoka Prefecture, Japan.

== Lines ==
Iriyamase Station is served by the Minobu Line and is located 5.6 kilometers from the southern terminus of the line at Fuji Station.

== Layout ==
Iriyamase Station consists of a single island platform connected to the station building by a footbridge. The station building is staffed. A small park outside the station has a preserved D51 steam locomotive. A spur freight line leads to the nearby Oji Paper Company factory.

=== Platform ===
1	■ Minobu Line	For Fujinomiya, Minobu, Kōfu
2	■ Minobu Line	For Fuji

== Adjacent stations ==
«	Service	»
Minobu Line
Limited Express Fujikawa: Does not stop at this station
Tatebori	Local	Fujine

== History ==
Iriyamase Station was opened on July 20, 1913, as one of the original Minobu Line stations for both passenger and freight services. It came under control of the Japanese Government Railways (JGR) on May 1, 1941. The JGR became the JNR (Japan National Railway) after World War II. Freight services were discontinued in 1972, the same year that the tracks from Fuji to Fujinomiya were expanded to a double track system. Along with the division and privatization of JNR on April 1, 1987, the station came under the control and operation of the Central Japan Railway Company.

Station numbering was introduced to the Minobu Line in March 2018; Iriyamase Station was assigned station number CC03.

== Passenger statistics ==
In fiscal 2017, the station was used by an average of 925 passengers daily (boarding passengers only).

== Surrounding area ==
Iriyamase Station is located in an industrial area with numerous paper mills and chemical plants.

== See also ==
- List of railway stations in Japan
