= Kai-Ueno Station =

Railway station in Ichikawamisato, Yamanashi Prefecture, Japan

Kai-Ueno Station 甲斐上野駅
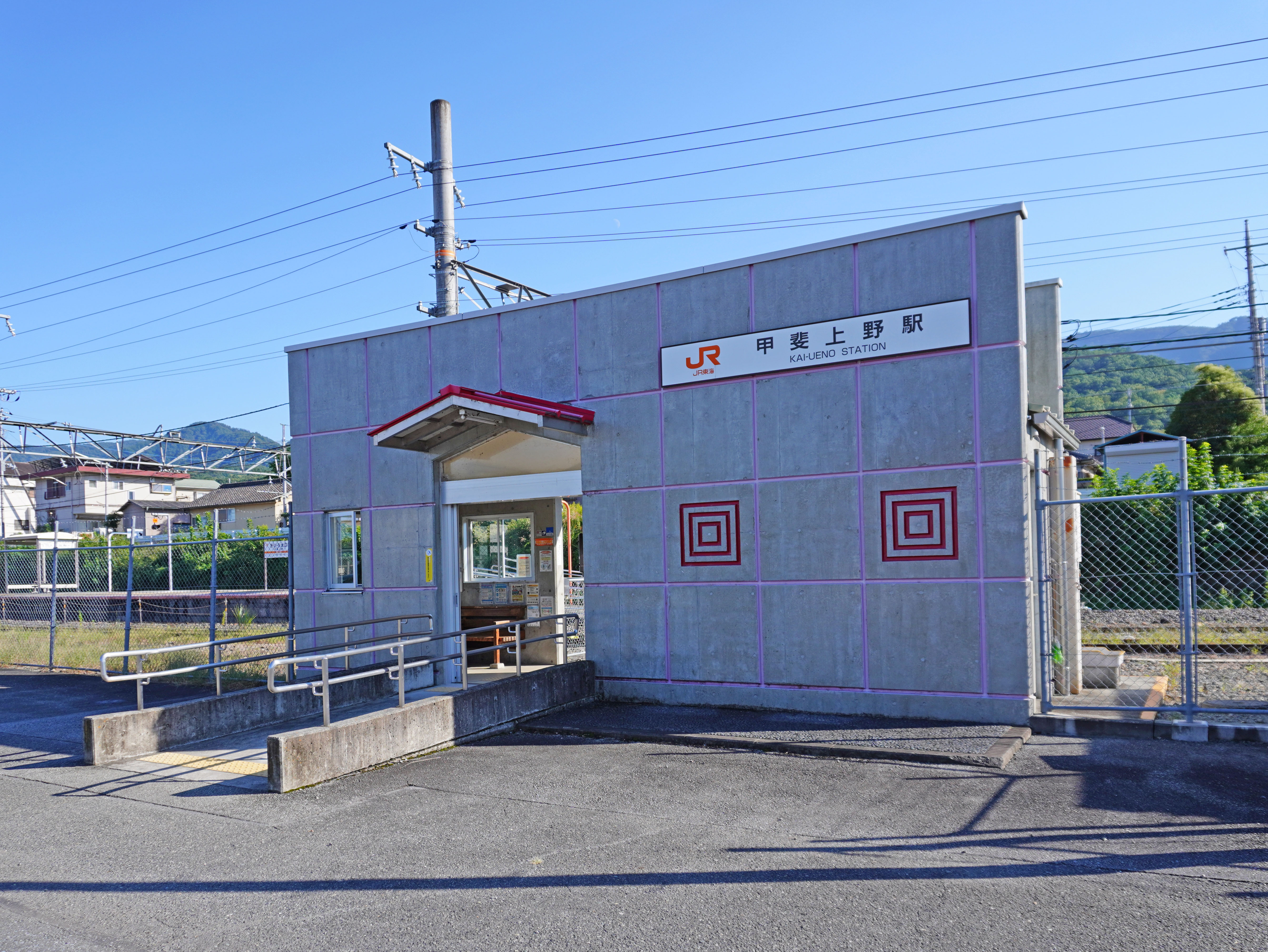
- JR Kai-Ueno Station, October 2022

General information
- Location: Ueno 2405, Ichikawamisato-machi, Nishiyatsushiro-gun, Yamanashi-ken; Japan
- Coordinates: 35.5695°N 138.5206°E
- Operator: JR Central
- Line: Minobu Line
- Distance: 72.8 kilometers from Fuji
- Platforms: 1 island platform

Other information
- Status: Unstaffed

History
- Opened: March 30, 1928

Passengers
- FY 2016: 73 daily
Location
- Location within Yamanashi Prefecture Location within Japan

Kai-Ueno Station (甲斐上野駅, Kai-Ueno-eki) is a train station on the Minobu Line of Central Japan Railway Company (JR Central) located in the town of Ichikawamisato, Nishiyatsushiro District, Yamanashi Prefecture, Japan.

== Lines ==
Kai-Ueno Station is served by the Minobu Line and is located 72.8 kilometers from the southern terminus of the line at Fuji Station.

== Layout ==
Kai-Ueno Station has one island platform connected to the station building by a level crossing. The station is unattended.

=== Platforms ===
1	■ Minobu Line	For Kōfu
2	■ Minobu Line	For Fuji, Minobu

== Adjacent stations ==
«	Service	»
Minobu Line
Limited Express Fujikawa: Does not stop at this station
Ashigawa	Local	Higashi-Hanawa

== History ==
Kai-Ueno Station was opened on March 30, 1928 as a station on the Fuji-Minobu Line. The line came under control of the Japanese Government Railways on May 1, 1941. The JGR became the JNR (Japan National Railway) after World War II. The station has been unattended since June 1983. Along with the division and privatization of JNR on April 1, 1987, the station came under the control and operation of the Central Japan Railway Company. A new station building was completed in February 2003.

== Surrounding area ==
- Ueno Post Office
- Fuefuki River

== See also ==
- List of railway stations in Japan
