= Higashi-Hanawa Station =

Railway station in Chūō, Yamanashi Prefecture, Japan

Higashi-Hanawa Station 東花輪駅
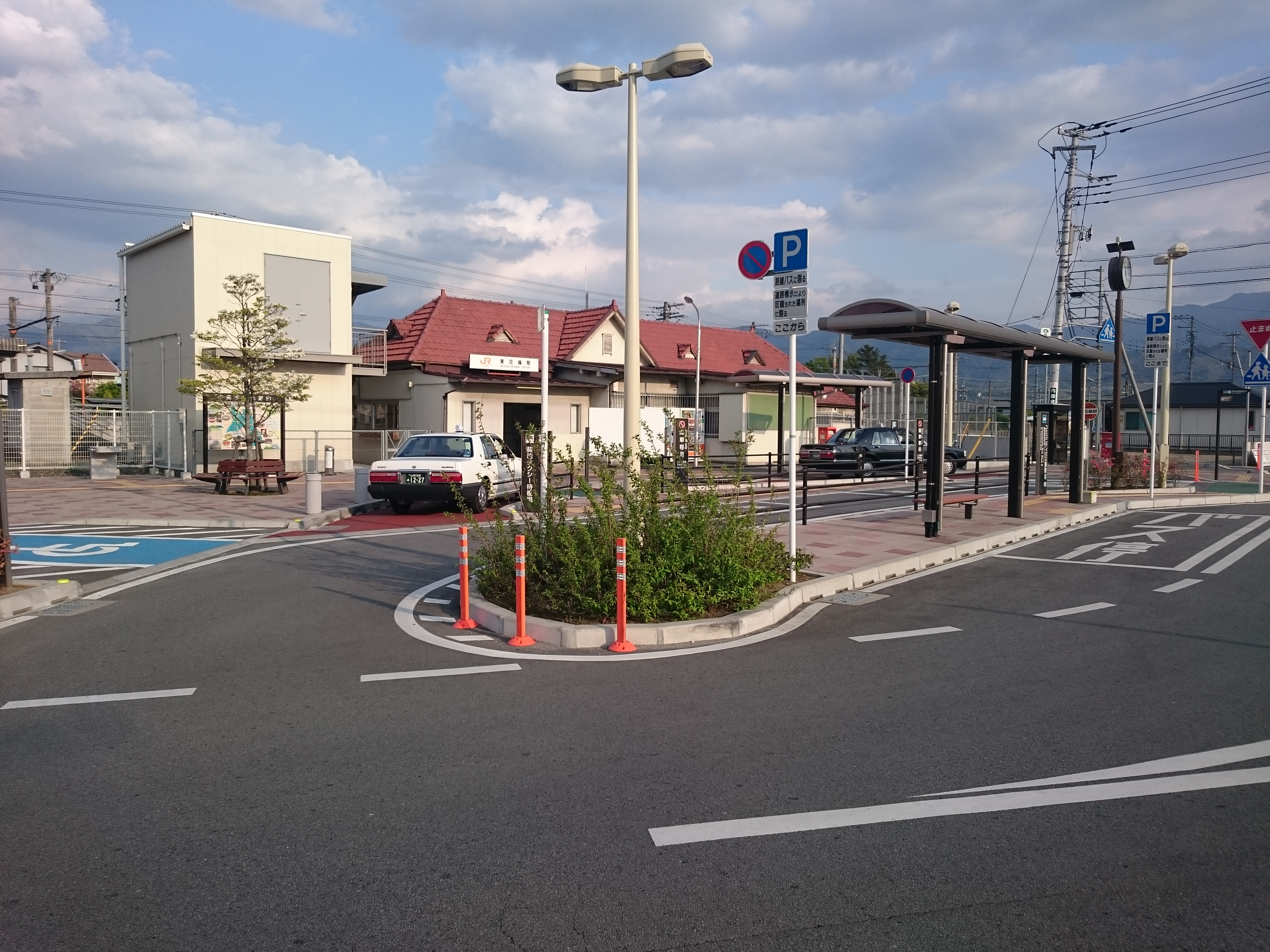
- JR Higashi-Hanawa Station, April 2015

General information
- Location: Higashi-Hanawa 888, Chūō-shi, Yamanashi-Ken; Japan
- Coordinates: 35.5946°N 138.5270°E
- Operator: JR Central
- Line: Minobu Line
- Distance: 76.3 km from Fuji
- Platforms: 1 island platform
- Tracks: 2

Other information
- Status: Staffed

History
- Opened: March 30, 1928

Passengers
- 2016: 673 daily
Location
- Location within Yamanashi Prefecture Location within Japan

Higashi-Hanawa Station (東花輪駅, Higashi-Hanawa-eki) is a railway station on the Minobu Line of JR Tōkai, located in the city of Chūō, Yamanashi Prefecture, Japan.

== Lines ==
Higashi-Hanawa Station is served by the JR Tōkai Chūō Main Line, and is located 76.3 rail kilometers from the southern terminus of the Minobu Line at Fuji Station.

== Layout ==
Higashi-Hanawa Station has a single island platform serving two tracks connected to the station building by a level crossing. There are ten sets of unused side tracks running parallel to the platform, which were formerly used to support freight depot operations. The station is one of the few stations on the Minobu line which is attended.

=== Platforms ===
1	■ Minobu Line	For Kōfu
2	■ Minobu Line	For Fuji, Minobu

== Adjacent stations ==
«	Service	»
Minobu Line
Ichikawa-Daimon	Limited Express Fujikawa	Minami-Kōfu
Kai-Ueno	Local	Koikawa

== History ==
Higashi-Hanawa Station was opened on March 30, 1928 as a station on the Fuji-Minobu Line. The line came under control of the Japanese Government Railways on May 1, 1941. The station building was reconstructed in 1950. The JGR became the JNR (Japan National Railway) after World War II. Along with the division and privatization of JNR on April 1, 1987, the station came under the joint control and operation of the Central Japan Railway Company and the Japan Freight Railway Company. However, scheduled freight operations were discontinued from September 29, 1998 and the freight handling facilities were abandoned by March 31, 2001.

== Passenger statistics ==
In fiscal 2016, the station was used by an average of 673 passengers daily (boarding passengers only).

== Surrounding area ==
- Tatomi Elementary School
- Tatomi Junior High School

== See also ==
- List of railway stations in Japan
