= Ochii Station =

Railway station in Ichikawamisato, Yamanashi Prefecture, Japan

Ochii Station 落居駅
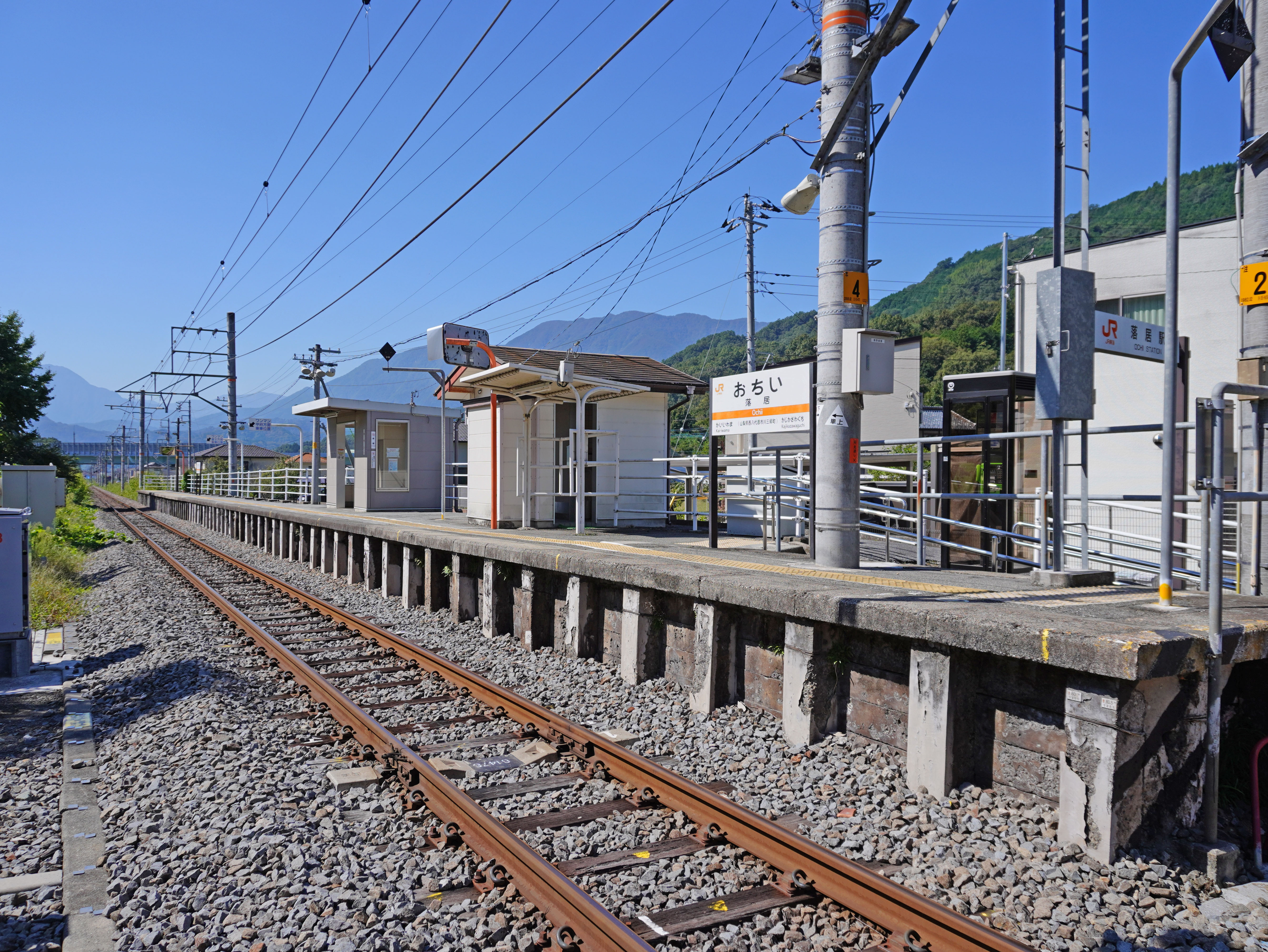
- Ochii Station in October 2022

General information
- Location: Ochii, Ichikawamisato-cho, Nishiyatsushiro-gun, Yamanashi-ken; Japan
- Coordinates: 35.5034°N 138.4714°E
- Operator: JR Central
- Line: Minobu Line
- Distance: 61.8 kilometers from Fuji
- Platforms: 1 side platform

Other information
- Status: Unstaffed

History
- Opened: June 1, 1930

Passengers
- FY 2016: 35 daily
Location
- Location within Yamanashi Prefecture Location within Japan

Ochii Station (落居駅, Ochii-eki) is a train station on the Minobu Line of Central Japan Railway Company (JR Central) located in the town of Ichikawamisato, Nishiyatsushiro District, Yamanashi Prefecture, Japan.

== Lines ==
Ochii Station is served by the Minobu Line and is located 61.8 kilometers from the southern terminus of the line at Fuji Station.

== Layout ==
Ochii Station has one side platform serving a single bi-directional track. There is no station building, but there is a wooden shelter on the platform. The station is unattended.

=== Platforms ===
1	■ Minobu Line	For Kōfu
2	■ Minobu Line	For Fuji, Minobu

== Adjacent stations ==
«	Service	»
Minobu Line
Limited Express Fujikawa: Does not stop at this station
Kai-Iwama	Local	Kajikazawaguchi

== History ==
Ochii Station was opened on June 1, 1930, as a passenger stop on the Fuji-Minobu Line. It was upgraded to a full station on October 1, 1938. The line came under control of the Japanese Government Railways on May 1, 1941. The JGR became the JNR (Japan National Railway) after World War II. Along with the division and privatization of JNR on April 1, 1987, the station came under the control and operation of the Central Japan Railway Company.

== Surrounding area ==
- The station is located in a residential district approximately 300 meters from Kai-Iwama Station

== See also ==
- List of railway stations in Japan
