= Fujine Station (Shizuoka) =

Railway station in Fuji, Shizuoka Prefecture, Japan

CC04 Fujine Station 富士根駅
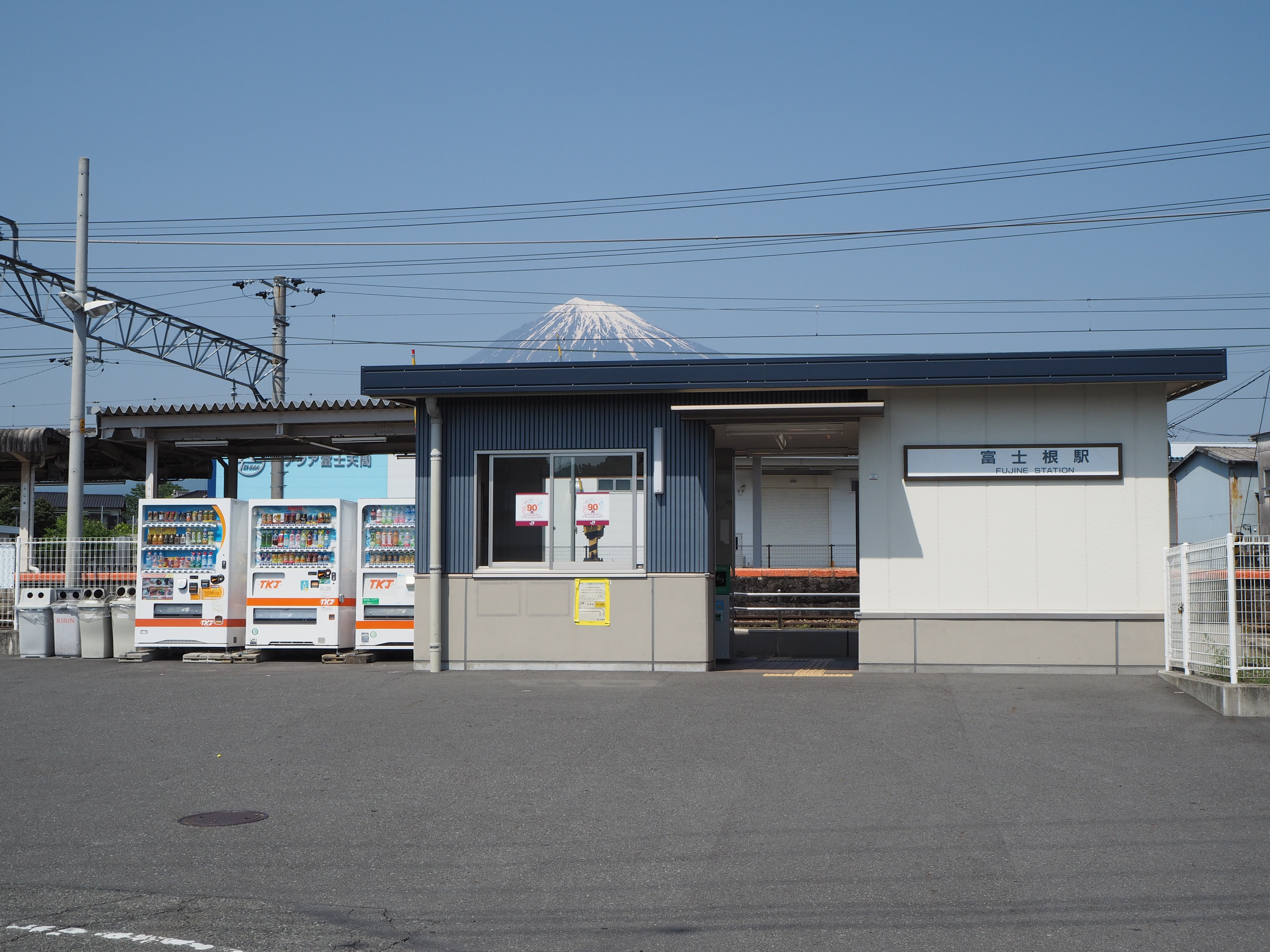
- JR Fujine Station in April 2018

General information
- Location: Tenma782, Fuji-shi, Shizuoka-ken; Japan
- Coordinates: 35°12′19″N 138°38′8″E
- Operator: JR Central
- Line: Minobu Line
- Distance: 8.0 kilometers from Fuji
- Platforms: 1 island platform

Other information
- Status: Unstaffed

History
- Opened: July 20, 1913

Passengers
- FY2017: 448 daily
Location
- Location within Shizuoka Prefecture Location within Japan

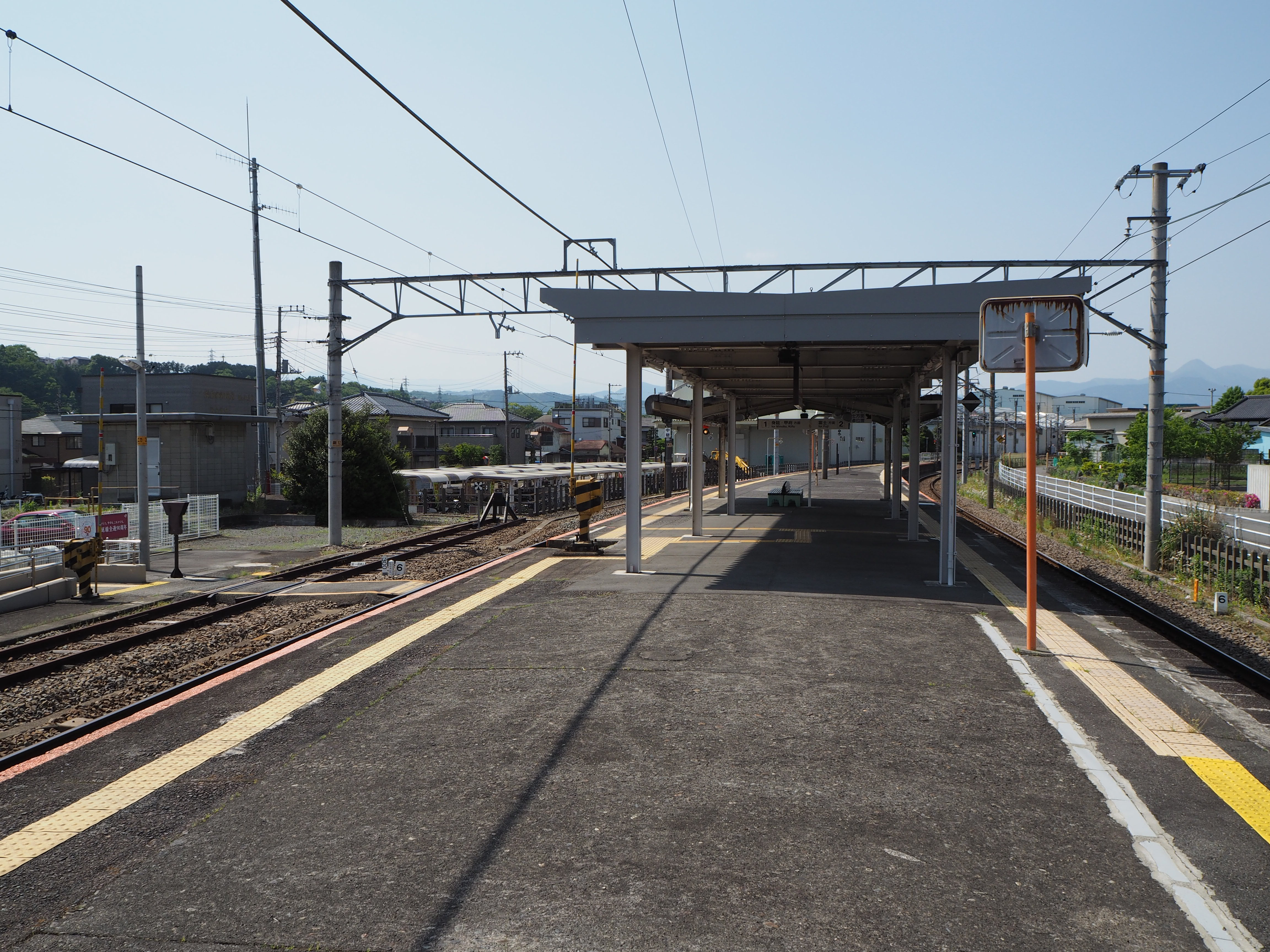
Platform

Fujine Station (富士根駅, Fujine-eki) is a railway station on the Minobu Line of Central Japan Railway Company (JR Central) located in the city of Fuji, Shizuoka Prefecture, Japan.

== Lines ==
Fujine Station is served by the Minobu Line and is located 8.0 kilometers from the southern terminus of the line at Fuji Station.

== Layout ==
Fujine Station consists of a single island platform connected to the station building by a level crossing. The station building has automated ticket machines, automated turnstiles and has been unstaffed since 1998. A short shunt track from Track 1 allows for parking and storage of various maintenance of way equipment for the Minobu Line.

=== Platform ===
1	■ Minobu Line	For Fujinomiya, Minobu, Kōfu
2	■ Minobu Line	For Fuji

== Adjacent stations ==
«	Service	»
Minobu Line
Limited Express Fujikawa: Does not stop at this station
Iriyamase	Local	Gendōji

== History ==
Fujine Station was opened on July 20, 1913, as one of the original Minobu Line stations for both passenger and freight services. It came under control of the Japanese Government Railway (JGR) on May 1, 1941. The JGR became the Japan National Railway (JNR) after World War II. Freight services were discontinued in 1972, the same year that the tracks from Fuji to Fujinomiya were expanded to a double track system. Along with the division and privatization of JNR on April 1, 1987, the station came under the control and operation of the Central Japan Railway Company.

Station numbering was introduced to the Minobu Line in March 2018; Iriyamase Station was assigned station number CC04.

== Passenger statistics ==
In fiscal 2017, the station was used by an average of 448 passengers daily (boarding passengers only).

== Surrounding area ==
Fujine Station is located in an industrial area with numerous paper mills and chemical plants.

== See also ==
- List of railway stations in Japan
