= Jōei Station =

Railway station in Shōwa, Yamanashi Prefecture, Japan

Jōei Station 常永駅
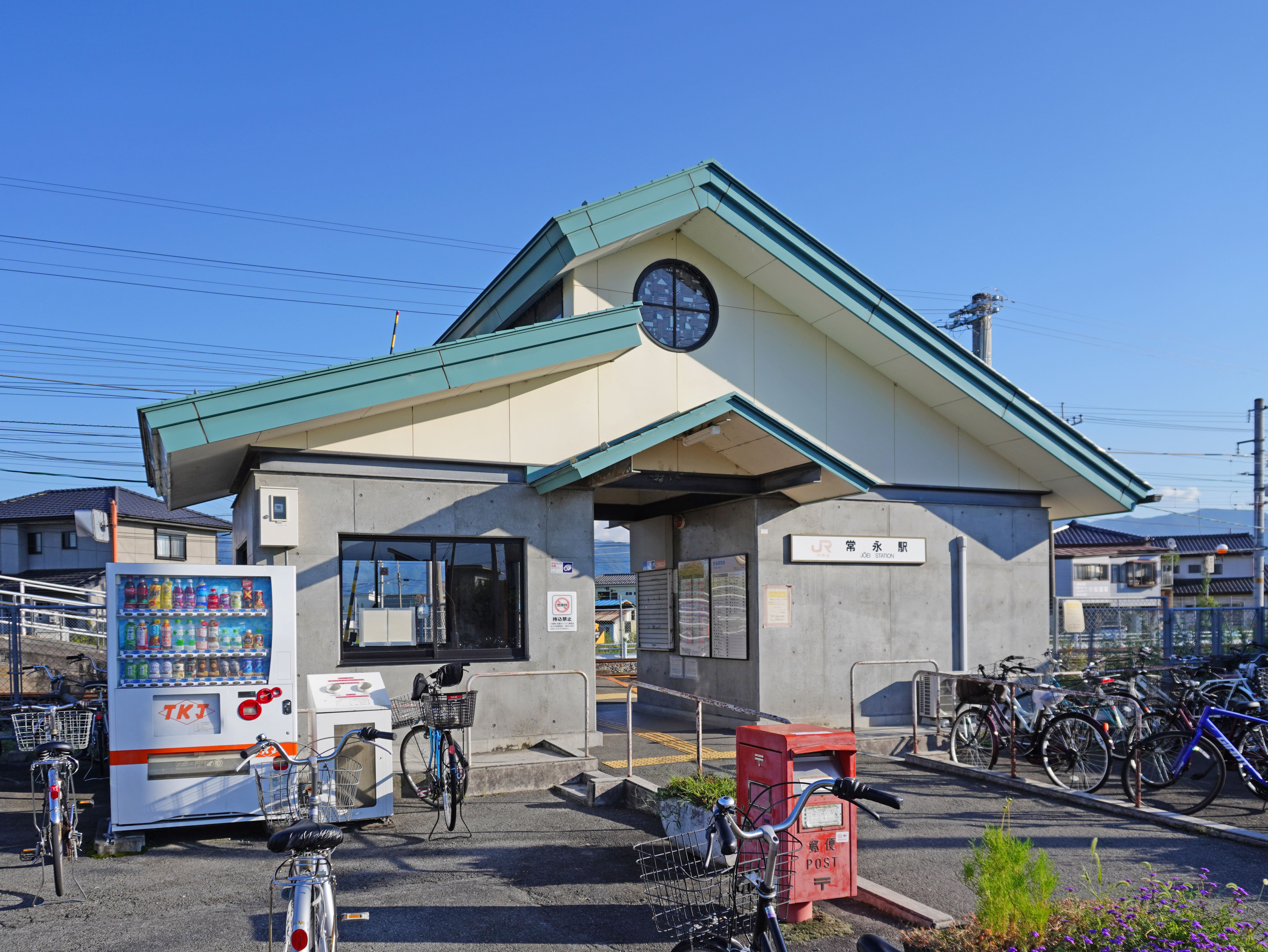
- JR Jōei Station, 2022

General information
- Location: 922 Kamigato, Shōwa-machi, Nakakoma-gun, Yamanashi-ken; Japan
- Coordinates: 35.6167°N 138.5336°E
- Operator: JR Central
- Line: Minobu Line
- Distance: 78.9 kilometers from Fuji
- Platforms: 1 island platform

Other information
- Status: Unstaffed

History
- Opened: March 30, 1928
- Former names: Saijō-Jōei (until 1938)

Passengers
- FY2016: 397 daily
Location
- Location within Yamanashi Prefecture Location within Japan

Jōei Station (常永駅, Jōei-eki) is a railway station on the Minobu Line of Central Japan Railway Company (JR Central) located in the town of Shōwa, Nakakoma District, Yamanashi Prefecture, Japan.

== Lines ==
Jōei Station is served by the Minobu Line and is located 78.9 kilometers from the southern terminus of the line at Fuji Station.

== Layout ==
Jōei Station has one island platform connected to the station building by a level crossing. The station is unattended.

=== Platforms ===
1	■ Minobu Line	For Kōfu
2	■ Minobu Line	For Fuji, Minobu

== Adjacent stations ==
«	Service	»
Minobu Line
Limited Express Fujikawa: Does not stop at this station
Koikawa	Local	Kokubo

== History ==
Jōei Station was opened on March 30, 1928 as Saijō-Jōei Station (西条常永駅, Saijō-Jōei-eki) on the Fuji-Minobu Line. The station was renamed to its present name on October 1, 1938. The line came under control of the Japanese Government Railways on May 1, 1941. The JGR became the JNR (Japan National Railway) after World War II. The station has been unattended since June 1983. Along with the division and privatization of JNR on April 1, 1987, the station came under the control of the Central Japan Railway Company.

== Surrounding area ==
- Jōei Elementary School
- Kokubo Industrial Park

== See also ==
- List of railway stations in Japan
