= Minami-Kōfu Station =

Railway station in Kōfu, Yamanashi Prefecture, Japan

Minami-Kōfu Station 南甲府駅
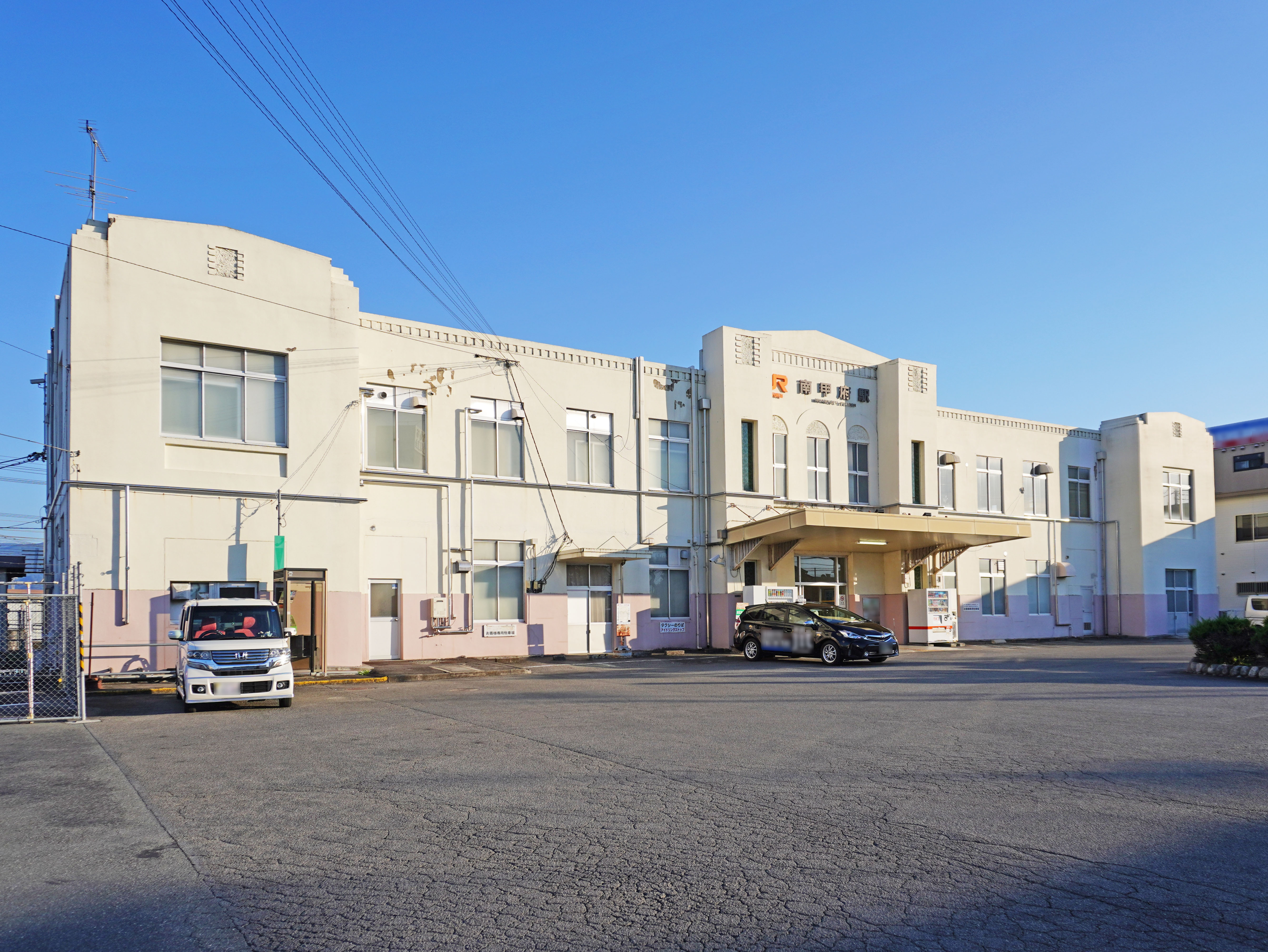
- JR Minami-Kōfu Station, October 2022

General information
- Location: 1-32 Minamiguchi-cho, Kōfu, Yamanashi （山梨県甲府市南口町1-36） Japan
- Coordinates: 35.6436°N 138.5784°E
- Operator: JR Central
- Line: Minobu Line
- Distance: 84.0 kilometers from Fuji
- Platforms: 1 island platform

Other information
- Status: Staffed

History
- Opened: March 30, 1928
- Former names: Kōfu-Minamiguchi (until 1938)

Passengers
- 2016: 540 daily
Location
- Location within Yamanashi Prefecture Location within Japan

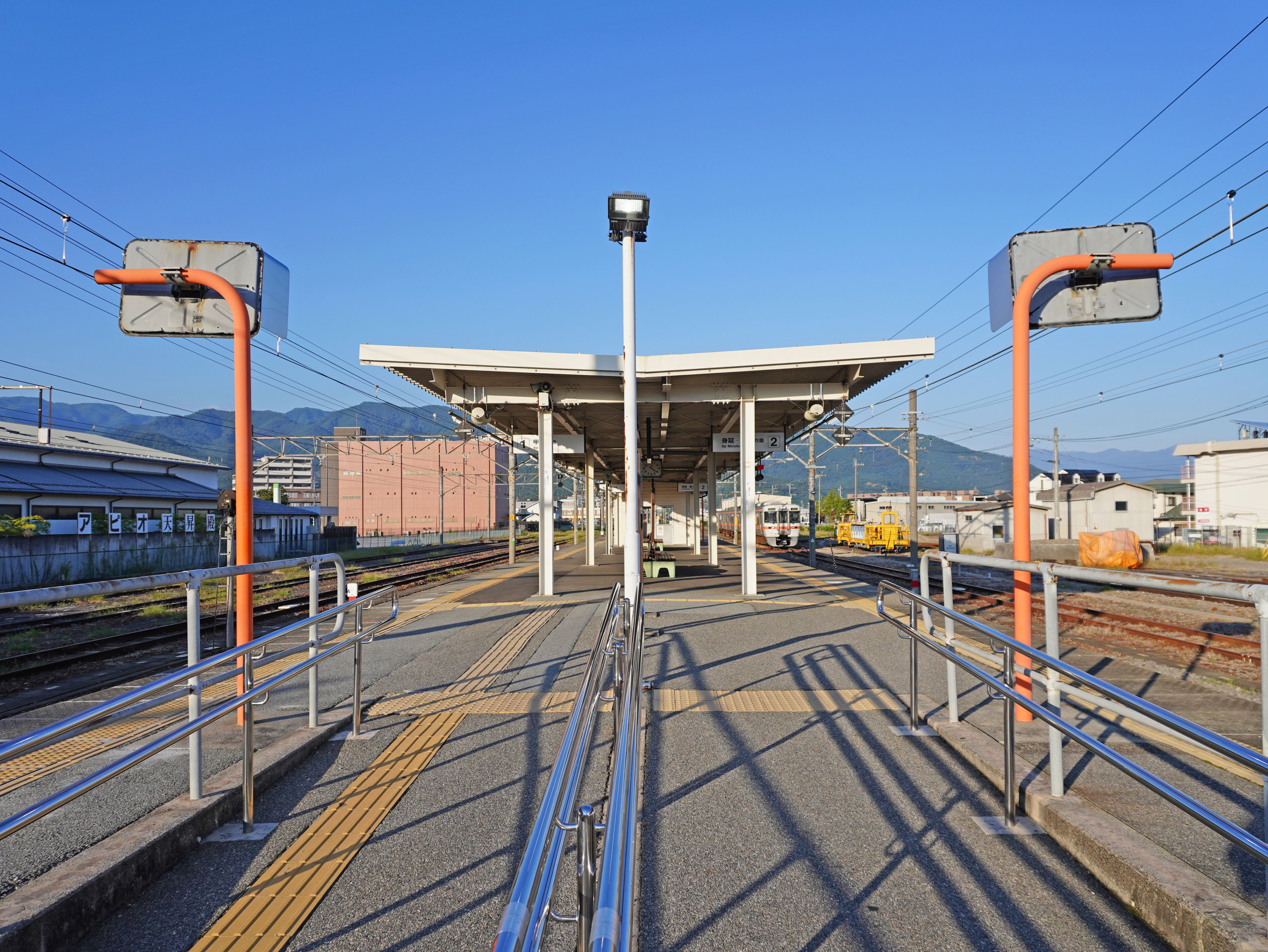
Central Minami-kōfu Station Platform

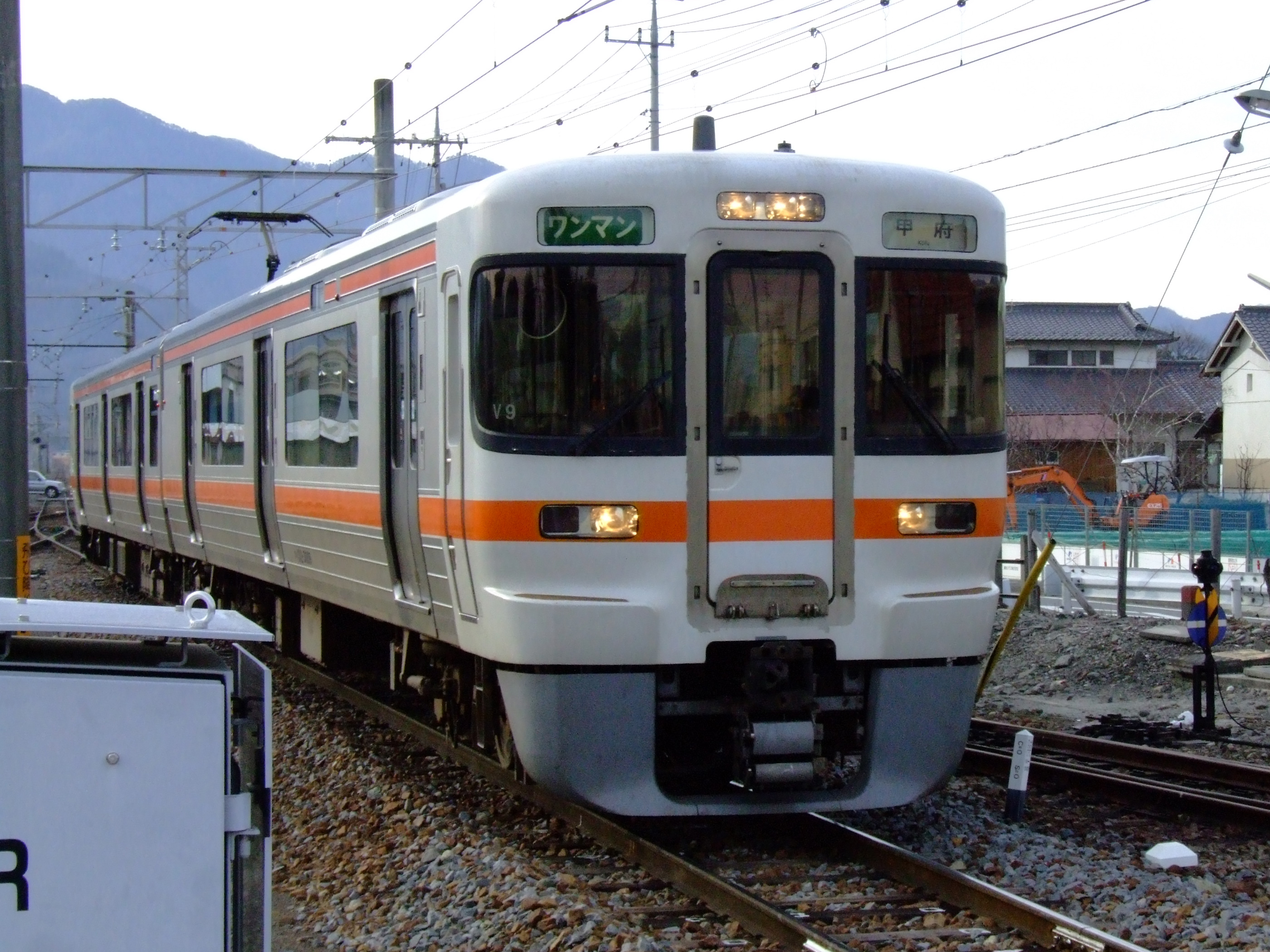

Minami-Kōfu Station (南甲府駅, Minami-Kōfu-eki) is a train station on the Minobu Line of Central Japan Railway Company (JR Central) located in city of Kōfu, Yamanashi Prefecture, Japan.

== Lines ==
Minami-Kōfu Station is served by the Minobu Line and is located 84.0 kilometers from the southern terminus of the line at Fuji Station.

== Layout ==
Minami-Kōfu Station has one island platform connected to the station building by an underground passage. It is one of the few stations on the Minobu Line which is attended. The marshalling yard for the Minobu Line is also at this station.

=== Platforms ===
1	■ Minobu Line	For Kōfu
2	■ Minobu Line	For Fuji, Minobu

== Adjacent stations ==
«	Service	»
Minobu Line
Higashi-Hanawa	Limited Express Fujikawa	Kōfu
Kai-Sumiyoshi	Local	Zenkōji

== History ==
Minami-Kōfu Station was opened on March 30, 1928 as Kōfu-Minamiguchi Station (甲府南口, Kōfu-Minamiguchi-eki) on the Fuji-Minobu Line. When operations were consigned to the government on October 1, 1938, the station name was changed to its present name. The line came under control of the Japanese Government Railways on May 1, 1941. The JGR became the JNR (Japan National Railway) after World War II. Along with the division and privatization of JNR on April 1, 1987, the station came under the joint control of the Central Japan Railway Company and the Japan Freight Railway Company. All freight operations were discontinued in October 1997, and the freight depot was abandoned as of March 31, 2001.

== Surrounding area ==
- Kōfu Minami Junior High School

== See also ==
- List of railway stations in Japan
