= Kai-Sumiyoshi Station =

Railway station in Kōfu, Yamanashi Prefecture, Japan

Kai-Sumiyoshi Station 甲斐住吉駅
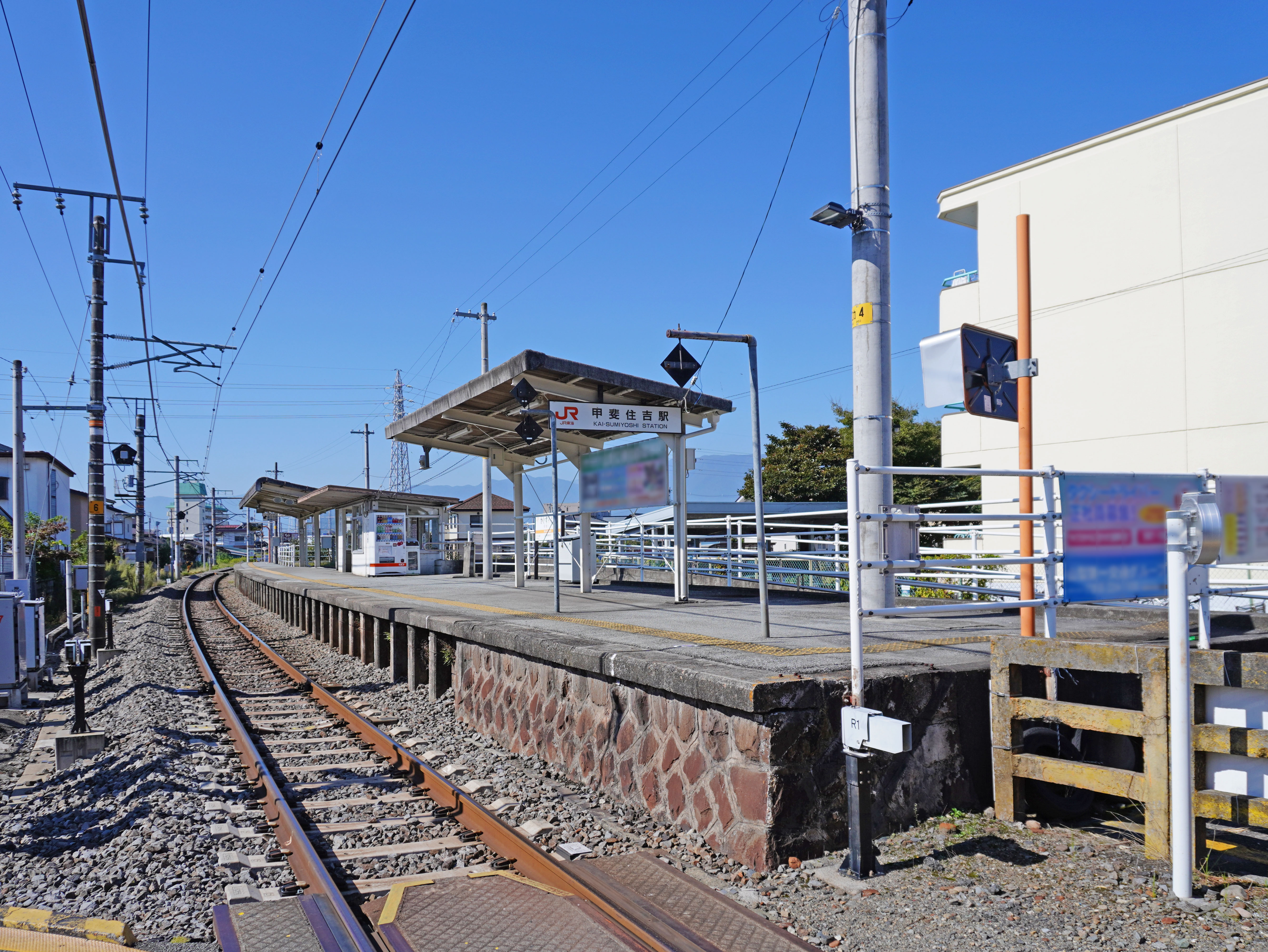
- JR Kai-Sumiyoshi Station, October 2022

General information
- Location: Sumiyoshi 2-chome, Kōfu-shi, Yamanashi-ken; Japan
- Coordinates: 35.6363°N 138.5698°E
- Operator: JR Central
- Line: Minobu Line
- Distance: 83.1 kilometers from Fuji
- Platforms: 1 side platform

Other information
- Status: Unstaffed

History
- Opened: March 30, 1928

Passengers
- 2016: 498 daily
Location
- Location within Yamanashi Prefecture Location within Japan

Kai-Sumiyoshi Station (甲斐住吉駅, Kai-Sumiyoshi-eki) is a train station on the Minobu Line of Central Japan Railway Company (JR Central) located in city of Kōfu, Yamanashi Prefecture, Japan.

== Lines ==
Kai-Sumiyoshi Station is served by the Minobu Line and is located 83.1 kilometers from the southern terminus of the line at Fuji Station.

== Layout ==
Kai-Sumiyoshi Station has one side platform serving a single bi-directional track. The station is unattended.

== Adjacent stations ==
«	Service	»
Minobu Line
Limited Express Fujikawa: Does not stop at this station
Kokubo	Local	Minami-Kōfu

== History ==
Kai-Sumiyoshi Station was opened on April 1, 1931 as a signal stop on the Fuji-Minobu Line. It was elevated to a full station on October 1, 1938. The line came under control of the Japanese Government Railways on May 1, 1941. The JGR became the JNR (Japan National Railway) after World War II. Along with the division and privatization of JNR on April 1, 1987, the station came under the control of the Central Japan Railway Company.

== Surrounding area ==
- Kōfu Minami High School

== See also ==
- List of railway stations in Japan
