= Kajikazawaguchi Station =

Railway station in Ichikawamisato, Yamanashi Prefecture, Japan

Kajikazawaguchi Station 鰍沢口駅
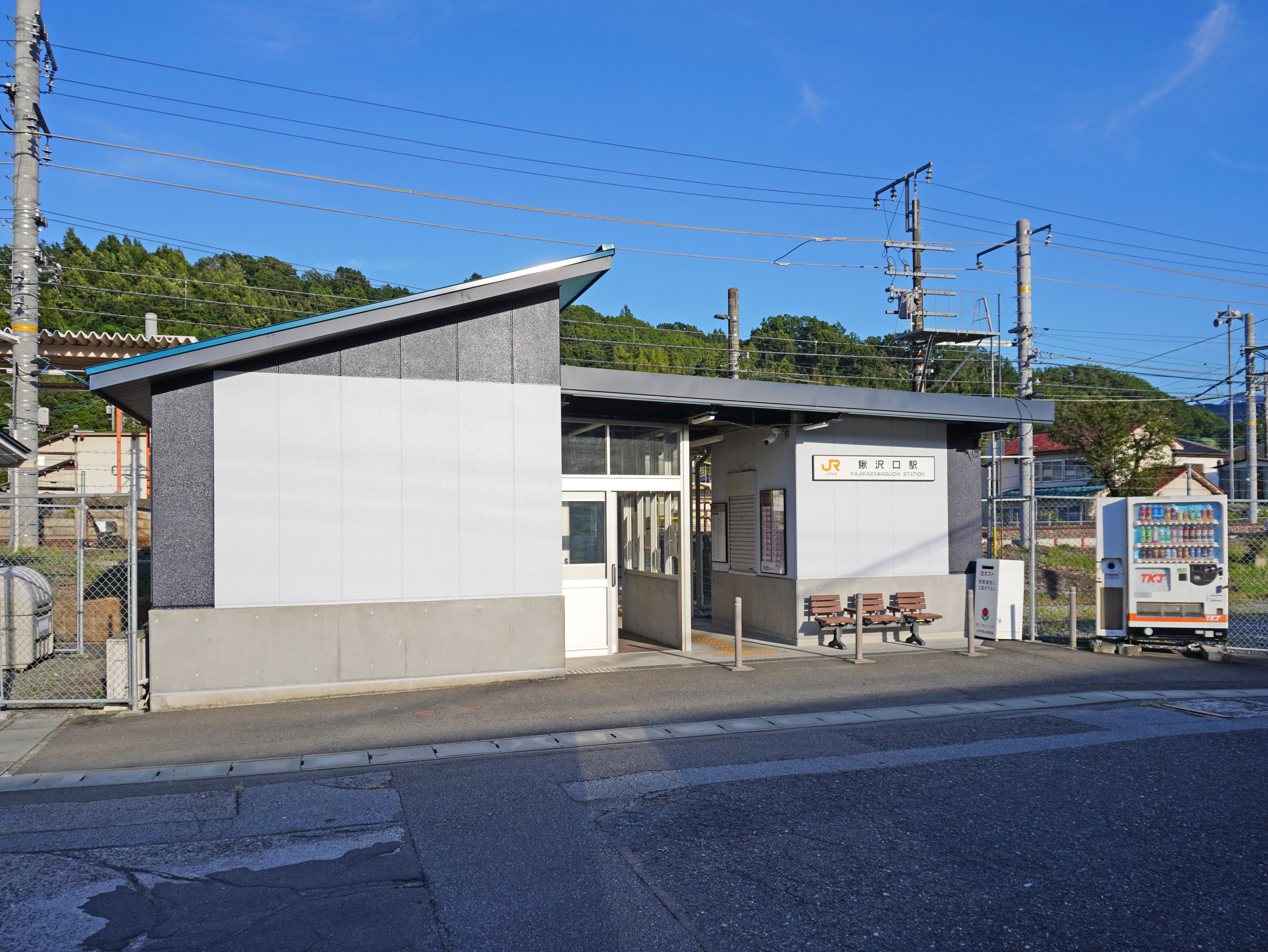
- Kajikazawaguchi Station, September 2022

General information
- Location: 369 Kurosawa, Ichikawamisato-cho, Nishiyatsushiro-gun, Yamanashi-ken; Japan
- Coordinates: 35.5416°N 138.4711°E
- Operator: JR Central
- Line: Minobu Line
- Distance: 66.8 kilometers from Fuji
- Platforms: 1 island platform

Other information
- Status: Unstaffed

History
- Opened: December 17, 1927
- Former names: Kajikazawa-Kurosawa (to 1938)

Passengers
- FY 2016: 128 daily
Location
- Location within Yamanashi Prefecture Location within Japan

Kajikazawaguchi Station (鰍沢口駅, Kajikazawaguchi-eki) is a train station on the Minobu Line of Central Japan Railway Company (JR Central) located in the town of Ichikawamisato, Nishiyatsushiro District, Yamanashi Prefecture, Japan.

== Lines ==
Kajikazawaguchi Station is served by the Minobu Line and is located 66.8 kilometers from the southern terminus of the line at Fuji Station.

== Layout ==
Kajikazawaguchi Station has one island platform connected to the station building by a level crossing. The station is unattended.

=== Platforms ===
1	■ Minobu Line	For Fuji, Minobu
2	■ Minobu Line	For Kōfu

== Adjacent stations ==
«	Service	»
Minobu Line
Kai-Iwama	Limited Express Fujikawa	Ichikawa-Daimon
Ochii	Local	Ichikawa-Daimon

== History ==
Kajikazawaguchi Station was opened on December 17, 1927, as Kajikazawa-Kurosawa Station (鰍沢黒沢駅, Kajikazawa-Kurosawa-eki) on the Fuji-Minobu Line. It was renamed to its current name on October 1, 1938. The line came under control of the Japanese Government Railways on May 1, 1941. The JGR became the JNR (Japan National Railway) after World War II. Along with the division and privatization of JNR on April 1, 1987, the station came under the control and operation of the Central Japan Railway Company. The station has been unattended since March 2012.

It was used as a filming location for the 2015 movie Our Little Sister.

== Surrounding area ==
- Fuefuki River

== See also ==
- List of railway stations in Japan
