= Zenkōji Station =

Railway station in Kōfu, Yamanashi Prefecture, Japan

Zenkōji Station 善光寺駅
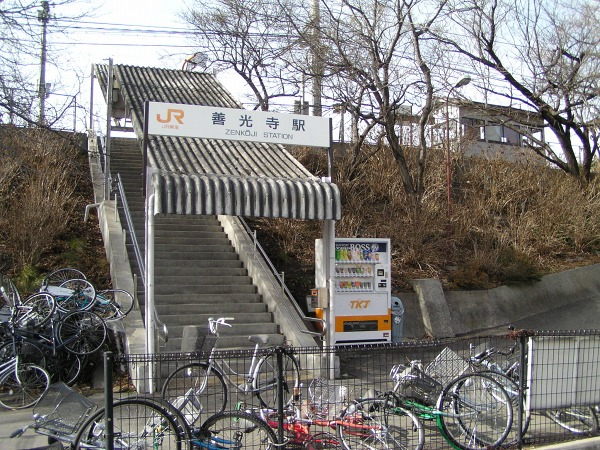
- JR Zenkōji Station, January 2006

General information
- Location: Zenkōji 1-chome, Kōfu, Yamanashi （山梨県甲府市善光寺一丁目） Japan
- Coordinates: 35°39′36.14″N 138°35′21.07″E
- Operator: JR Central
- Line: Minobu Line
- Distance: 86.3 kilometers from Fuji
- Platforms: 1 side platform

Other information
- Status: Unstaffed

History
- Opened: October 1, 1938

Passengers
- 2016: 414 daily
Location
- Location within Yamanashi Prefecture Location within Japan

Zenkōji Station (善光寺駅, Zenkōji-eki) is a train station on the Minobu Line of Central Japan Railway Company (JR Central) located in city of Kōfu, Yamanashi Prefecture, Japan.

== Lines ==
Zenkōji Station is served by the Minobu Line and is located 86.3 kilometers from the southern terminus of the line at Fuji Station.

== Layout ==
Zenkōji Station has one side platform serving a single bi-directional track. The station is unattended. There is no station building, but only a rain shelter on the platform, since the station building burned down in 1983.

== Adjacent stations ==
«	Service	»
Minobu Line
Limited Express Fujikawa: Does not stop at this station
Minami-Kōfu	Local	Kanente

??? is a railway station on the Minobu Line of Central Japan Railway Company (JR Central) located in the city of Kōfu, Yamanashi Prefecture, Japan. The station is located 86.3 rail kilometers from the southern terminus of the Minobu Line at Fuji Station.

== History ==
Zenkōji Station was opened on March 30, 1928 as a signal stop on the Fuji-Minobu Line. It was elevated to a full station when operations were consigned to the government on October 1, 1938. The line came under control of the Japanese Government Railways on May 1, 1941. The JGR became the JNR (Japan National Railway) after World War II. All freight operations were discontinued on November 1, 1960. The station has been unattended since April 10, 1983. Along with the division and privatization of JNR on April 1, 1987, the station came under the control of the Central Japan Railway Company.

== Surrounding area ==
- Kōfu Higashi Junior High School
- Kōfu Higashi High School

== See also ==
- List of railway stations in Japan
