= Ichikawa-Daimon Station =

Railway station in Ichikawamisato, Yamanashi Prefecture, Japan

Ichikawa-Daimon Station 市川大門駅
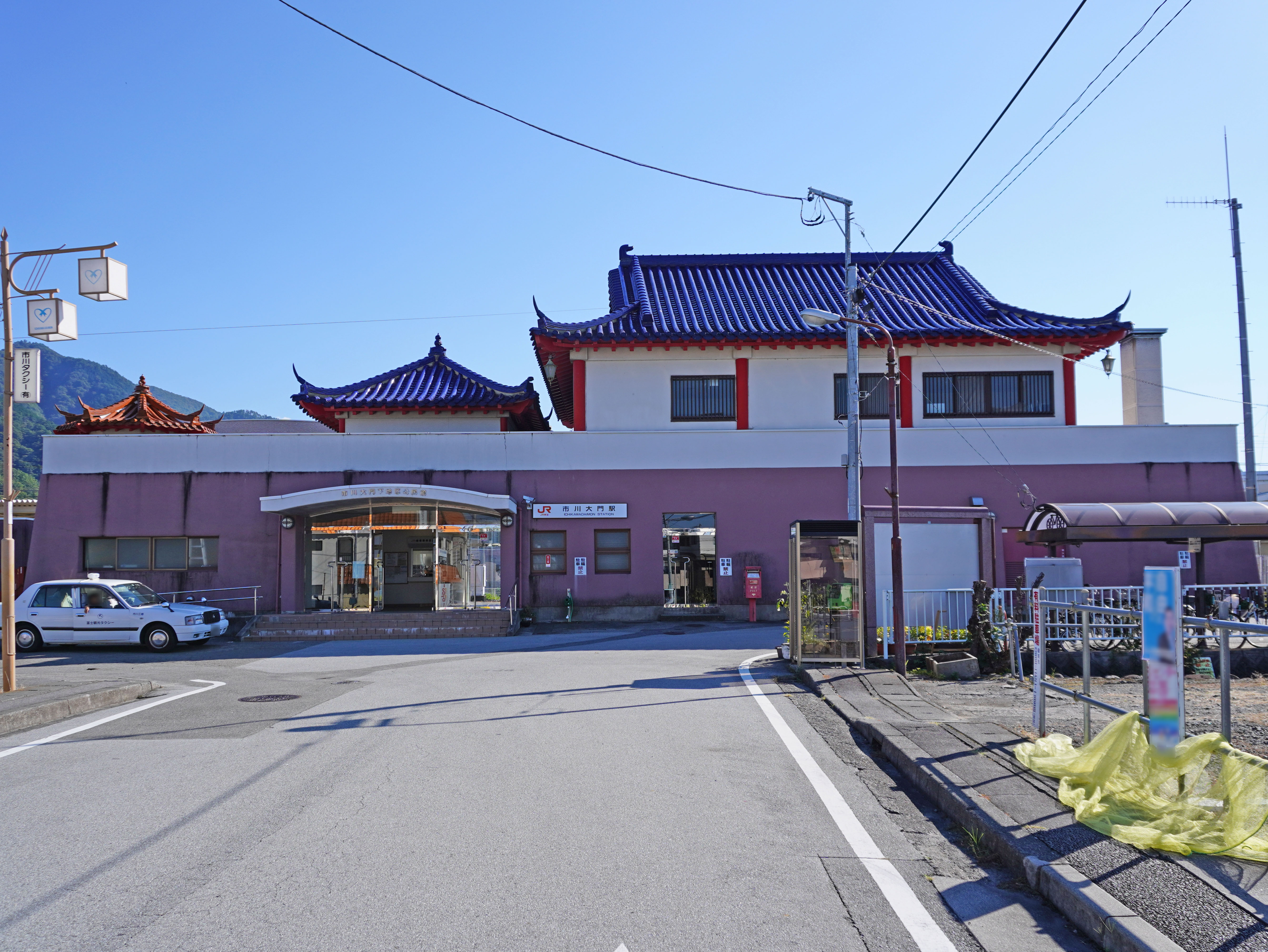
- Ichikawa-Daimon Station, October 2022

General information
- Location: 423-1 Daimon, Ichikawamisato-cho, Nishiyatsushiro-gun, Yamanashi-ken; Japan
- Coordinates: 35.5604°N 138.493°E
- Operator: JR Central
- Line: Minobu Line
- Distance: 69.8 kilometers from Fuji
- Platforms: 1 island platform

Other information
- Status: Staffed

History
- Opened: December 17, 1927

Passengers
- FY 2016: 523 daily
Location
- Location within Yamanashi Prefecture Location within Japan

Ichikawa-Daimon Station (市川大門駅, Ichikawa-Daimon-eki) is a train station on the Minobu Line of Central Japan Railway Company (JR Central) located in the town of Ichikawamisato, Nishiyatsushiro District, Yamanashi Prefecture, Japan.

== Lines ==
Ichikawa-Daimon Station is served by the Minobu Line and is located 69.8 kilometers from the southern terminus of the line at Fuji Station.

== Layout ==
Ichikawa-Daimon Station has one island platform connected to the station building by a level crossing. The station is staffed.

=== Platforms ===
1	■ Minobu Line	For Kōfu
2	■ Minobu Line	For Fuji, Minobu

== Adjacent stations ==
«	Service	»
Minobu Line
Kajikazawaguchi	Limited Express Fujikawa	Higashi-Hanawa
Kajikazawaguchi	Local	Ichikawa-Hommachi

== History ==
Ichikawa-Daimon Station was opened on December 17, 1927 as a station on the Fuji-Minobu Line. It was renamed to its current name on October 1, 1938. The line came under control of the Japanese Government Railways on May 1, 1941. Scheduled freight operations were discontinued in 1972. The JGR became the JNR (Japan National Railway) after World War II. The station has been unattended since April 1985. Along with the division and privatization of JNR on April 1, 1987, the station came under the control and operation of the Central Japan Railway Company. The station building was reconstructed in a traditional Chinese style in October 1995.

== Surrounding area ==
- Fuefuki River

== See also ==
- List of railway stations in Japan
