= Kanente Station =

Railway station in Kōfu, Yamanashi Prefecture, Japan

Kanente Station 金手駅
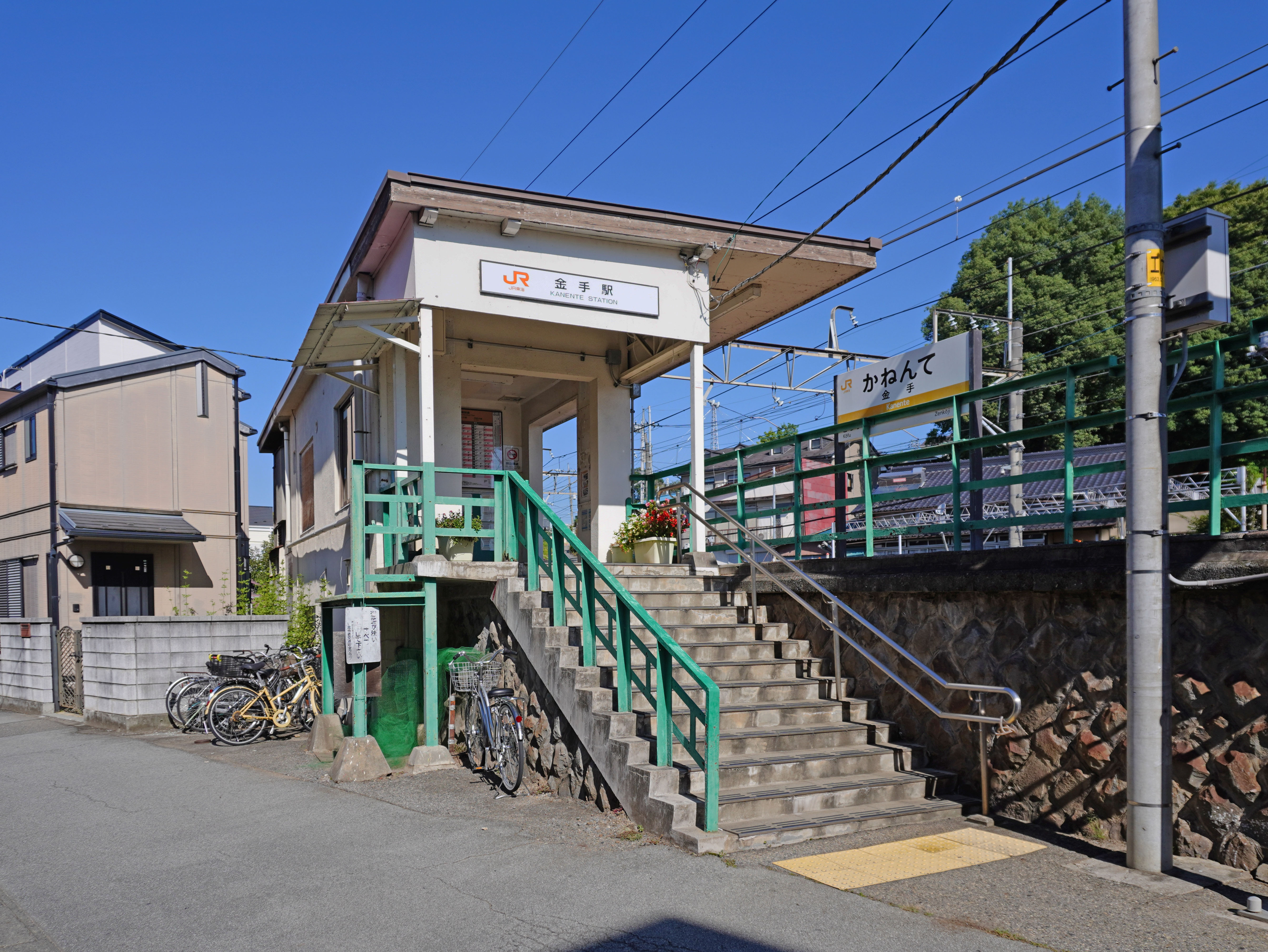
- JR Kanente Station, October 2022

General information
- Location: Jōto 4-chome, Kōfu-shi, Yamanashi-ken; Japan
- Coordinates: 35.6624°N 138.5787°E
- Operator: JR Central
- Line: Minobu Line
- Distance: 87.2 kilometers from Fuji
- Platforms: 1 side platform

Other information
- Status: Unstaffed

History
- Opened: August 15, 1929

Passengers
- 2016: 54 daily
Location
- Location within Yamanashi Prefecture Location within Japan

Kanente Station (金手駅, Kanente-eki) is a train station on the Minobu Line of the Central Japan Railway Company (JR Central) in the city of Kōfu, Yamanashi Prefecture, Japan.

== Lines ==
Kanente Station is served by the Minobu Line and is 87.2 kilometers from the southern terminus of the line at Fuji Station.

== Layout ==
Kanente Station has one side platform serving a single bidirectional track. The station is unattended, with no station building, only a rain shelter on the platform.

== Adjacent stations ==
«	Service	»
Minobu Line
Limited Express Fujikawa: Does not stop at this station
Zenkōji	Local	Kōfu

== History ==
Kanente Station was opened on August 15, 1929 as a passenger station on the Fuji-Minobu Line. Freight operations began and the system was consigned to the government on October 1, 1938. The line came under control of the Japanese Government Railways on May 1, 1941. The station burned down during the Bombing of Kofu in World War II. The JGR became the JNR (Japan National Railway) after World War II. The station was reopened on May 10, 1953. All freight operations were discontinued on April 1, 1959. The station has been unattended since October 1, 1970. Along with the division and privatization of JNR on April 1, 1987, the station came under the control of the Central Japan Railway Company.

== Surrounding area ==
- Kōfu Municipal Library

== See also ==
- List of railway stations in Japan
