= Ashigawa Station =

Railway station in Ichikawamisato, Yamanashi Prefecture, Japan

Ashigawa Station 芦川駅
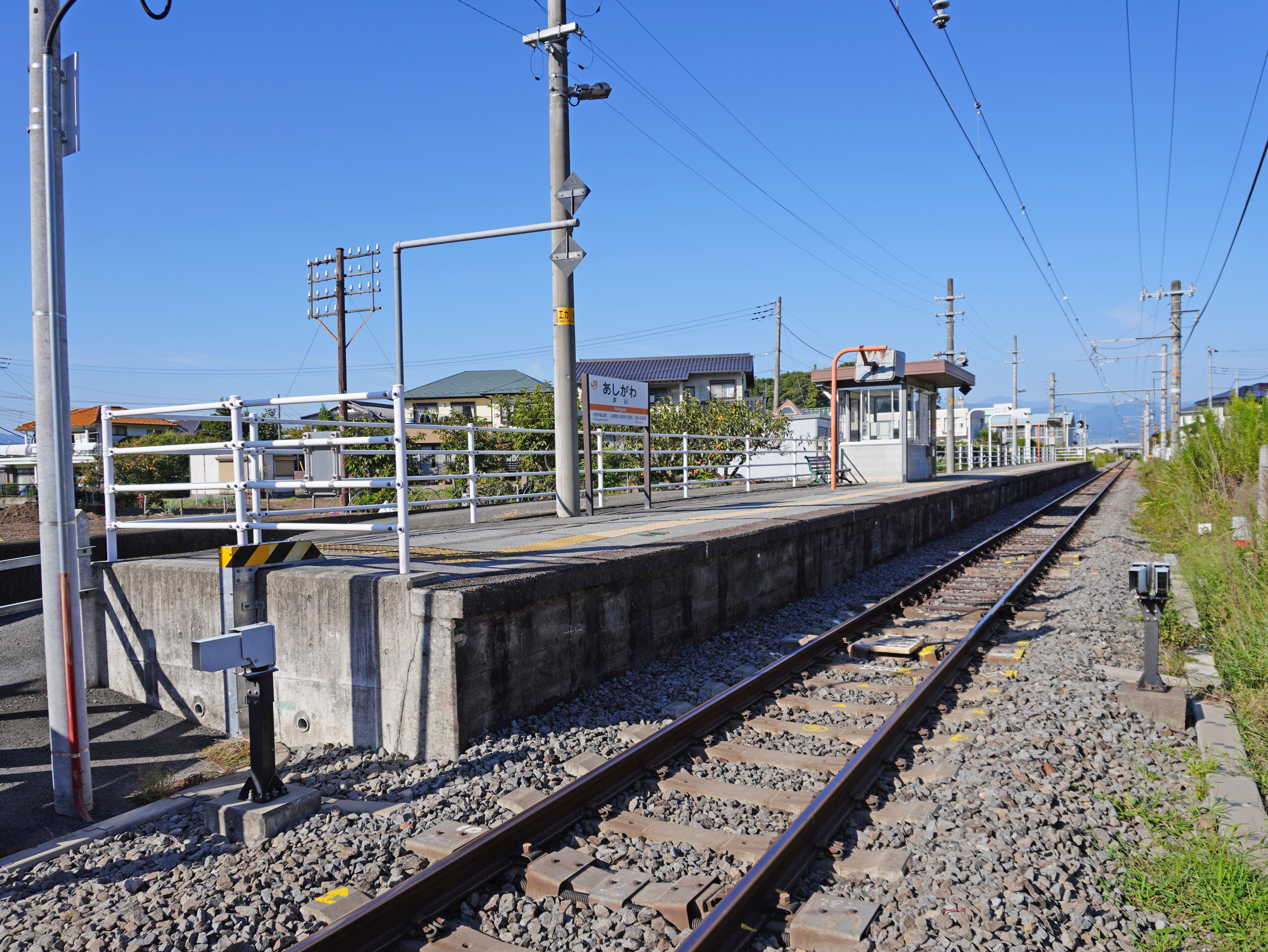
- Ashigawa Station, October 2022

General information
- Location: Ueno, Ichikawamisato-cho, Nishiyatsushiro-gun, Yamanashi-ken; Japan
- Coordinates: 35.5632°N 138.5113°E
- Operator: JR Central
- Line: Minobu Line
- Distance: 71.7 kilometers from Fuji
- Platforms: 1 side platform

Other information
- Status: Unstaffed

History
- Opened: February 11, 1929

Passengers
- FY2016: 89 daily
Location
- Location within Yamanashi Prefecture Location within Japan

Ashigawa Station (芦川駅, Ashigawa-eki) is a train station on the Minobu Line of Central Japan Railway Company (JR Central) located in the town of Ichikawamisato, Nishiyatsushiro District, Yamanashi Prefecture, Japan.

== Lines ==
Ashigawa Station is served by the Minobu Line and is located 71.7 kilometers from the southern terminus of the line at Fuji Station.

== Layout ==
Ashigawa Station has one side platform serving a single track. The station is not attended.

== Adjacent stations ==
«	Service	»
Minobu Line
Limited Express Fujikawa: Does not stop at this station
Ichikawa-Hommachi	Local	Kai-Ueno

== History ==
Ashigawa Station was opened on February 11, 1929, as a passenger stop on the Fuji-Minobu Line. It was elevated in status to a full station on October 1, 1938. The line came under control of the Japanese Government Railways on May 1, 1941. The station building was reconstructed in 1950. The JGR became the JNR (Japan National Railway) after World War II. The station has been unattended since April 1985. Along with the division and privatization of JNR on April 1, 1987, the station came under the control and operation of the Central Japan Railway Company.

== Surrounding area ==
- Ueno Elementary School
- former Mitama Town Hall

== See also ==
- List of railway stations in Japan
