= Koikawa Station (Yamanashi) =

Railway station in Chūō, Yamanashi Prefecture, Japan

Koikawa Station 小井川駅
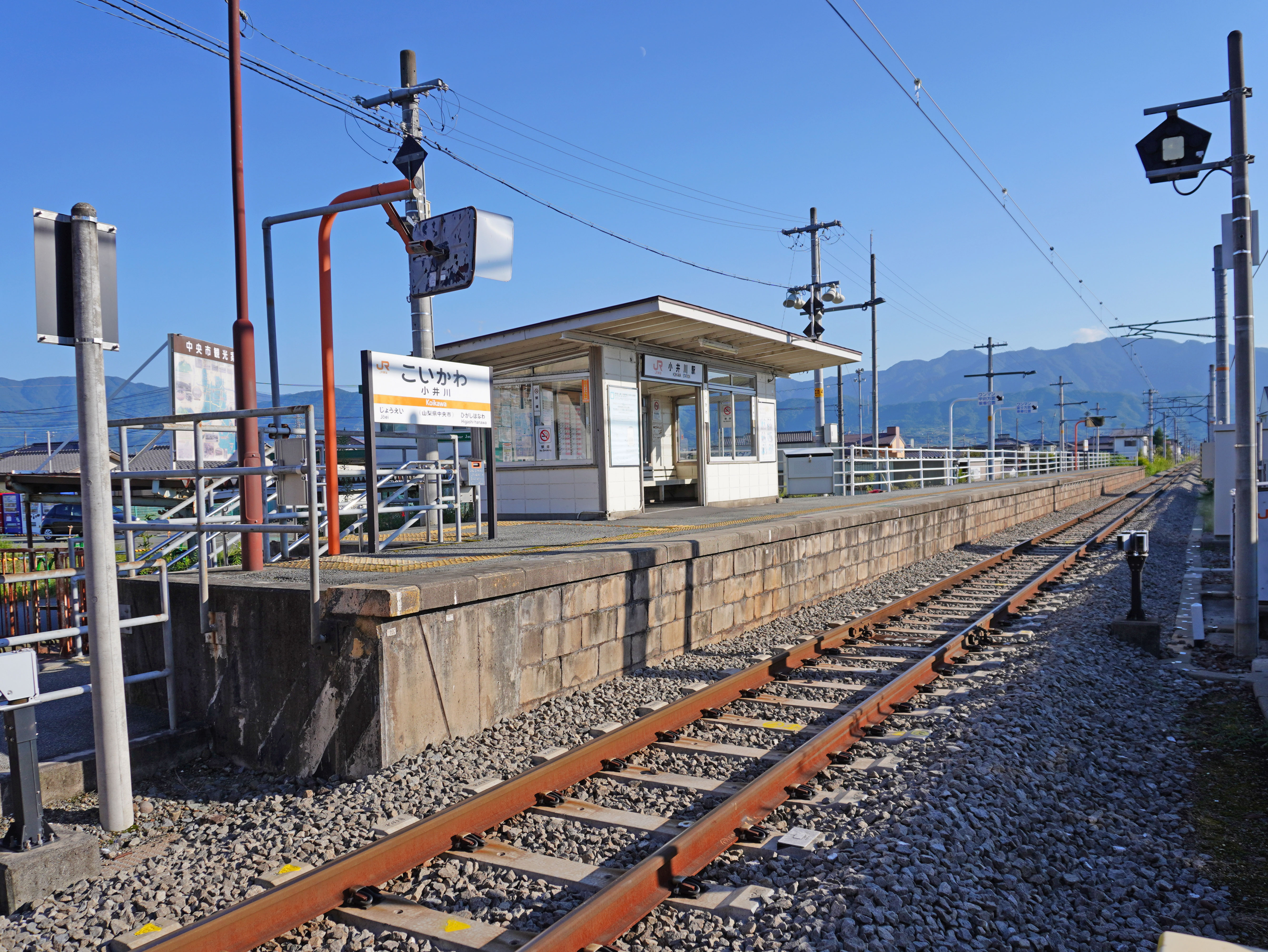
- JR Koikawa Station, October 2022

General information
- Location: Kami-Sanjō, Chūō-shi, Yamanashi-ken; Japan
- Coordinates: 35.6045°N 138.5284°E
- Operator: JR Central
- Line: Minobu Line
- Distance: 77.5 km from Fuji
- Platforms: 1 side platform
- Tracks: 1

Other information
- Status: Unstaffed

History
- Opened: August 15, 1929

Passengers
- 2016: 215 daily
Location
- Location within Yamanashi Prefecture Location within Japan

Koikawa Station (小井川駅, Koikawa-eki) is a railway station on the Minobu Line of JR Tōkai, located in the city of Chūō, Yamanashi Prefecture, Japan.

== Lines ==
Koikawa Station is served by the JR Tōkai Minobu Line, and is located 77.5 rail kilometers from the southern terminus of the Minobu Line at Fuji Station.

== Layout ==
The station has one side platform serving a single bi-directional track. There is no station building, but only a shelter on the platform. The station is unattended.

== Adjacent stations ==
| « | Service | » |
Minobu Line
Limited Express Fujikawa: Does not stop at this station
| Higashi-Hanawa | Local | Jōei |

== History ==
Koikawa Station was opened on August 15, 1929, as a passenger stop on the Fuji-Minobu Line. It was elevated in status to a full station on October 1, 1938. The line came under control of the Japanese Government Railways on May 1, 1941. The JGR became the JNR (Japan National Railway) after World War II. Along with the division and privatization of JNR on April 1, 1987, the station came under the control and operation of the Central Japan Railway Company.

== Passenger statistics ==
In fiscal 2016, the station was used by an average of 215 passengers daily (boarding passengers only).

== Surrounding area ==
- Yamanashi University Medical School

== See also ==
- List of railway stations in Japan
