= Fujikawa (train) =

Japanese limited express train service

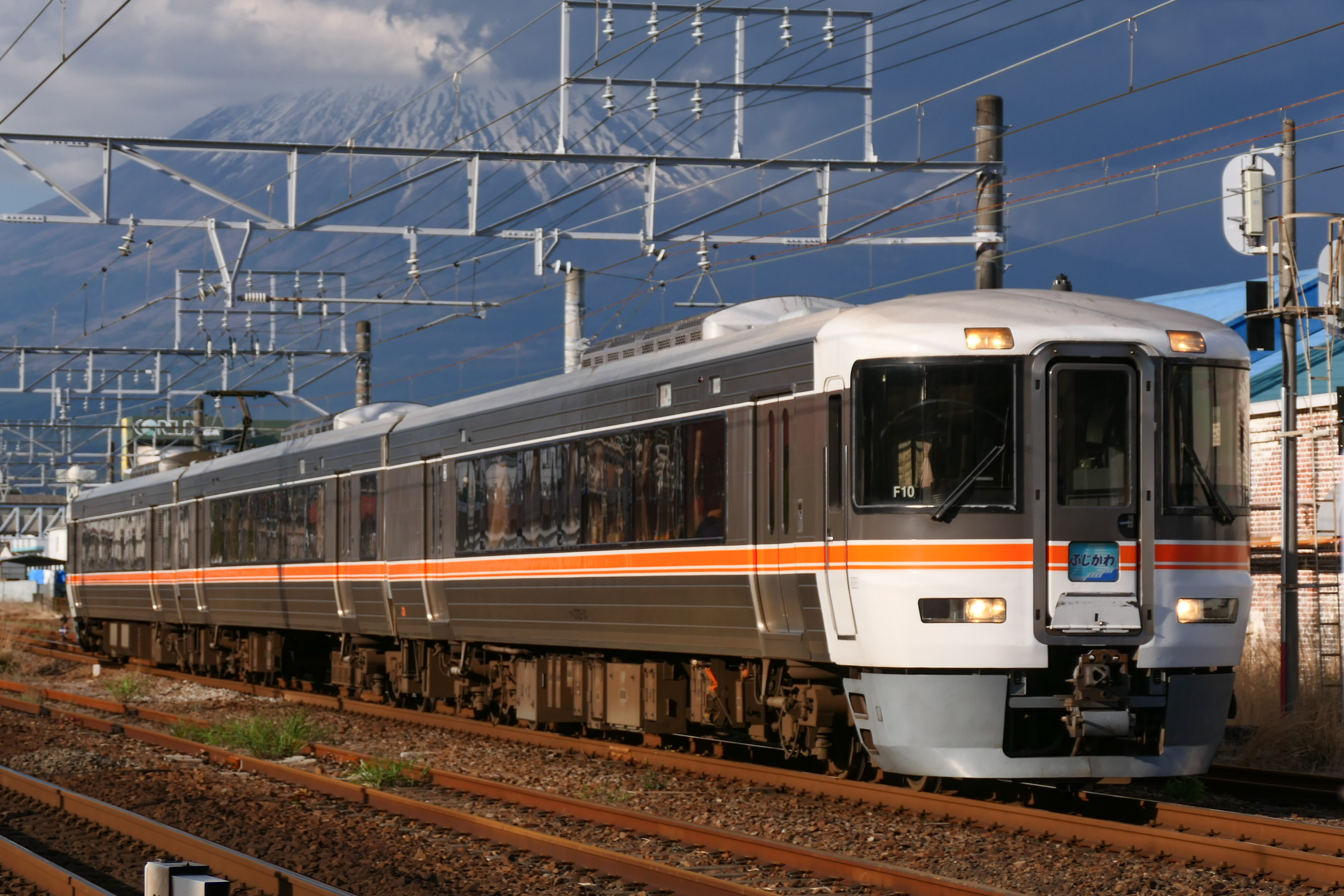
- 373 series EMU on a Fujikawa service

Overview
- Service type: Limited express
- Status: Operational
- First service: 1956 (Semi express); 1966 (Express); 1995 (Limited express)
- Current operator: JR Central
- Former operator: JNR

Route
- Termini: Shizuoka; Kōfu
- Stops: 13
- Distance travelled: 122.4 km (76.1 mi)
- Average journey time: 2 hours 30 minutes approx
- Service frequency: 7 return workings daily
- Lines used: Tōkaidō Main Line, Minobu Line

On-board services
- Class: Standard
- Disabled access: Yes
- Sleeping arrangements: None
- Catering facilities: None
- Observation facilities: None
- Entertainment facilities: None
- Other facilities: Restrooms

Technical
- Rolling stock: 373 series EMU
- Electrification: 1,500 V DC
- Operating speed: 110 km/h (68 mph)
- Track owner: JR Central

The Fujikawa (ふじかわ) is a limited express train service in Japan operated by Central Japan Railway Company (JR Central), which runs between Shizuoka and Kōfu. Since October 1995, it has been branded as Wide View Fujikawa, following the introduction of new 373 series EMUs replacing the previous 165 series trains.

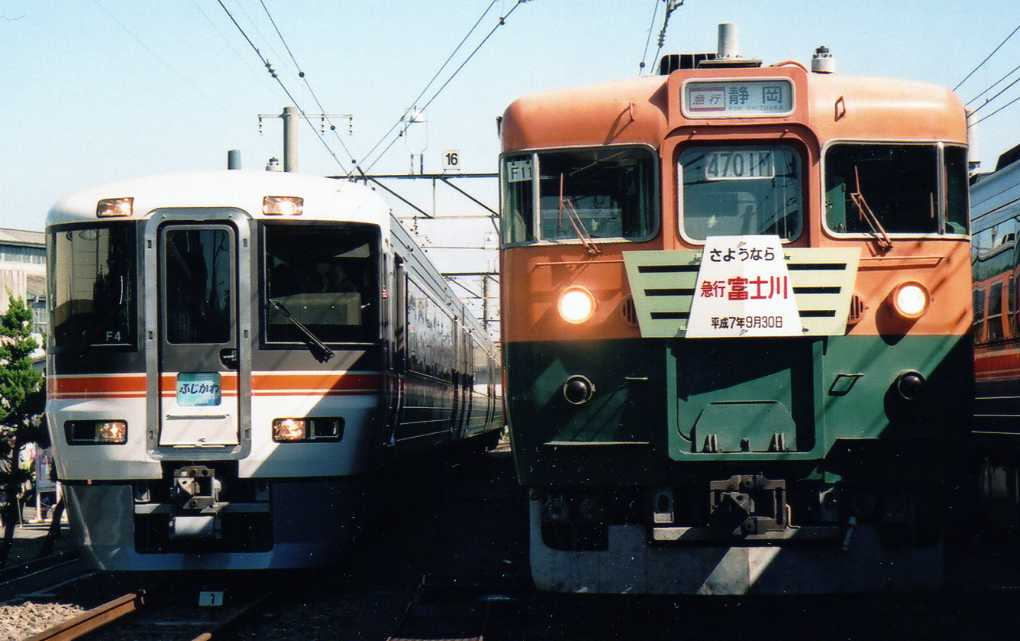
373 and 165 series EMUs at an open day at Shizuoka in October 1995

== History ==
The Fujikawa (富士川) was introduced on 20 March 1956 as a "Semi express" train running between Fuji and Kōfu using 80 series 4-car EMUs. From 1 October 1964, this was extended to run to and from Shizuoka.

From 5 March 1966, the service between Shizuoka and Kōfu was upgraded to "Express" status. From 15 March 1972, the 80 series EMUs were replaced by 165 series EMUs displaced by the opening of the Sanyō Shinkansen.

From 1 October 1995, the service was upgraded to become a Limited express following introduction of new 373 series EMU trains. The name was also changed to ふじかわ in hiragana.

From 18 March 2007, all cars were made no-smoking.

== Stops ==
Trains stop at the following stations:

Shizuoka – Shimizu – Fuji – Fujinomiya – Utsubuna – Minobu – Shimobe-onsen – Kai-Iwama – Kajikazawaguchi – Ichikawa-Daimon – Higashi-Hanawa – Minami-Kōfu – Kōfu

== Service ==
Like all JR Central limited express trains, a limited express fee has to be paid, on top of the normal fee to ride this service. Services are formed of 3-car 373 series EMUs. There are 7 return workings a day, with the journey time taking approximately 2 hours 30 minutes from Shizuoka to Kōfu. Trains operate at a maximum speed of 110 km/h (68 mph).

== Facilities ==
Only standard class is available on this service. Seat reservations can be made for an additional fee. There are no catering facilities available, though restrooms are available on this train.
