= Yamanashi Science Museum =

Coordinates: 35°40′10″N 138°34′49″E

- 山梨県立科学館
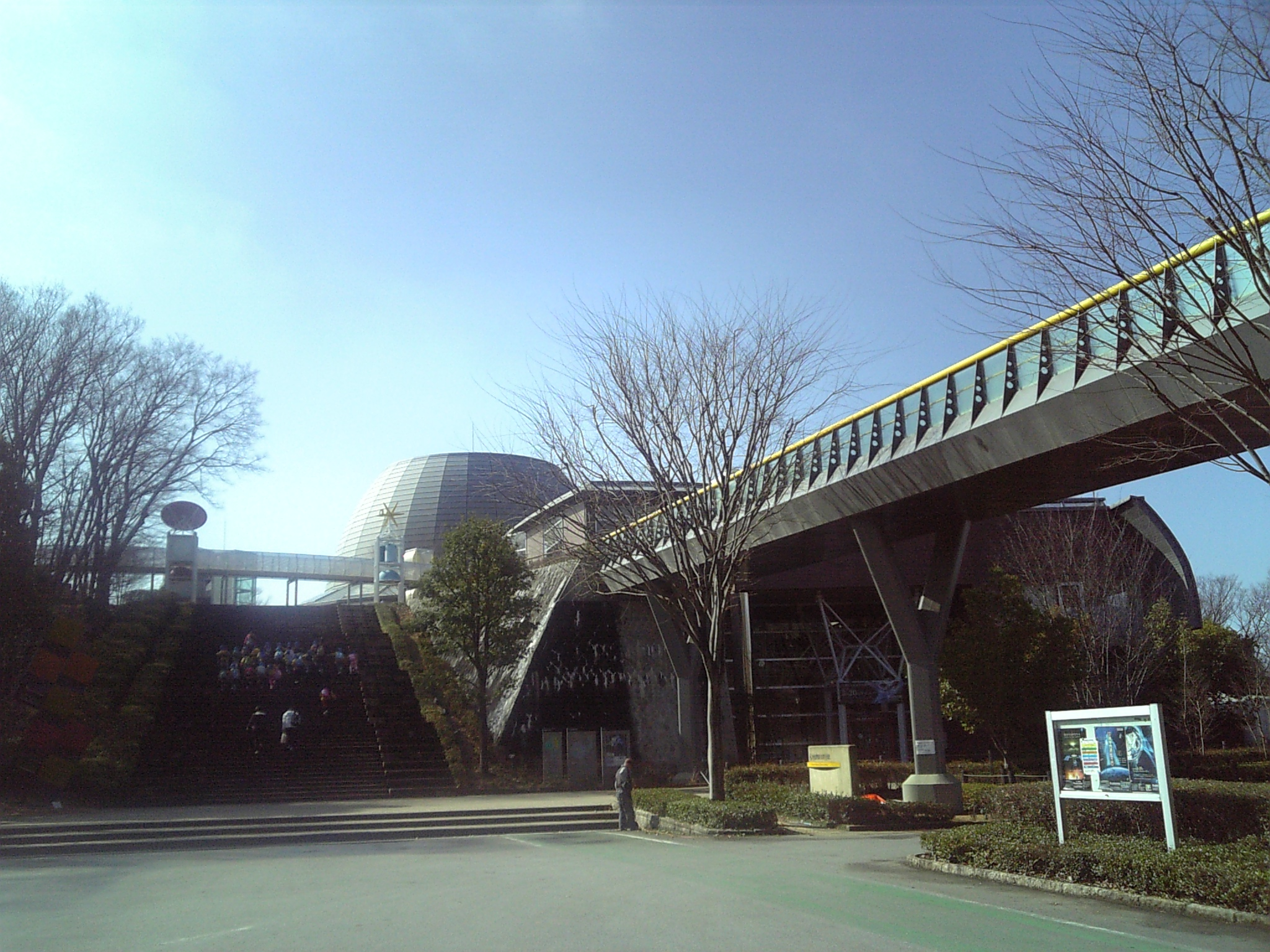
- Established: 1998
- Location: Atago-cho, Kōfu, Yamanashi Prefecture, Japan
- Type: Astronomy and technology museum
- Website: Yamanashi Science Museum

Yamanashi Science Museum (山梨県立科学館, Yamanashi-kenritsu kagaku-kan) is a science museum located in Kōfu, Yamanashi Prefecture, Japan. The museum specializes in astronomy and technology.

== History ==
The museum was originally located at Kofu Castle but was moved to its present location in 1998 when reconstruction of the Kofu Castle began.

== Facilities ==
The museum includes a planetarium, astronomical observatory dome, exhibition room, experience study room, and a library. The museum is a 25 minute walk from the north exit of Kōfu Station.
