= Ichikawamisato =

Ichikawamisato 市川三郷町
- Town
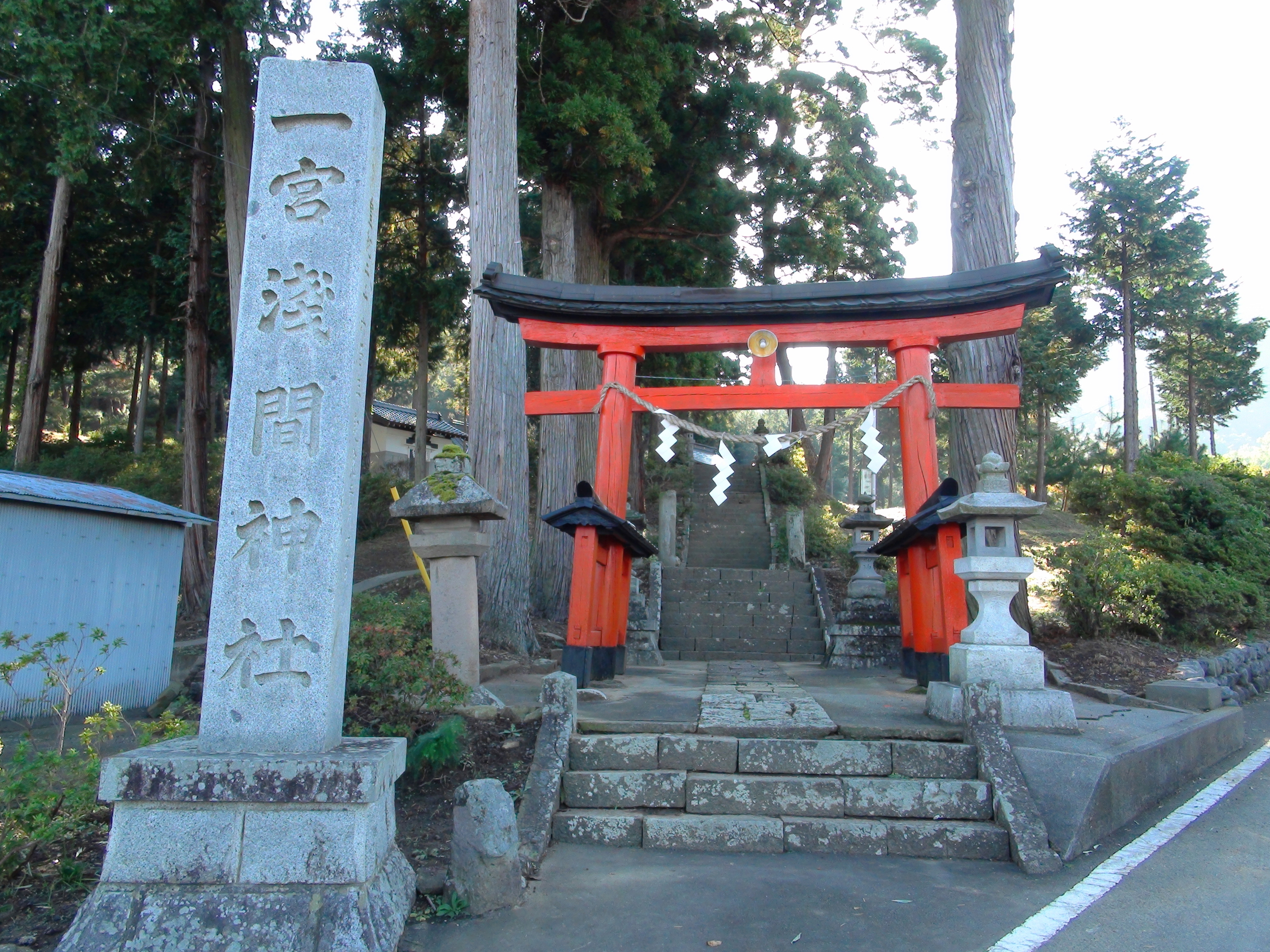
- Ichinomiya Sengen Shrine in Ichikawamisato

- Flag Seal

- Location of Ichikawamisato in Yamanashi Prefecture

- Coordinates: 35°33′55″N 138°30′09″E
- Country: Japan
- Region: Chūbu; Tōkai
- Prefecture: Yamanashi
- District: Nishiyatsushiro

Area
  - Total: 75.18 km^{2} (29.03 sq mi)

Population (June 1, 2019)
  - Total: 15,799
  - Density: 210.1/km^{2} (544.3/sq mi)
- Time zone: UTC+9 (Japan Standard Time)
- Tree: Sakura
- Flower: Gentiana scabra
- Phone number: 055-272-1101
- Address: 1790-3 Ichikawa-Daimon, Ichikawamisato-chō, Nishiyatsushiro -gun, Yamanashi-ken 409-3601
- Website: Official website]

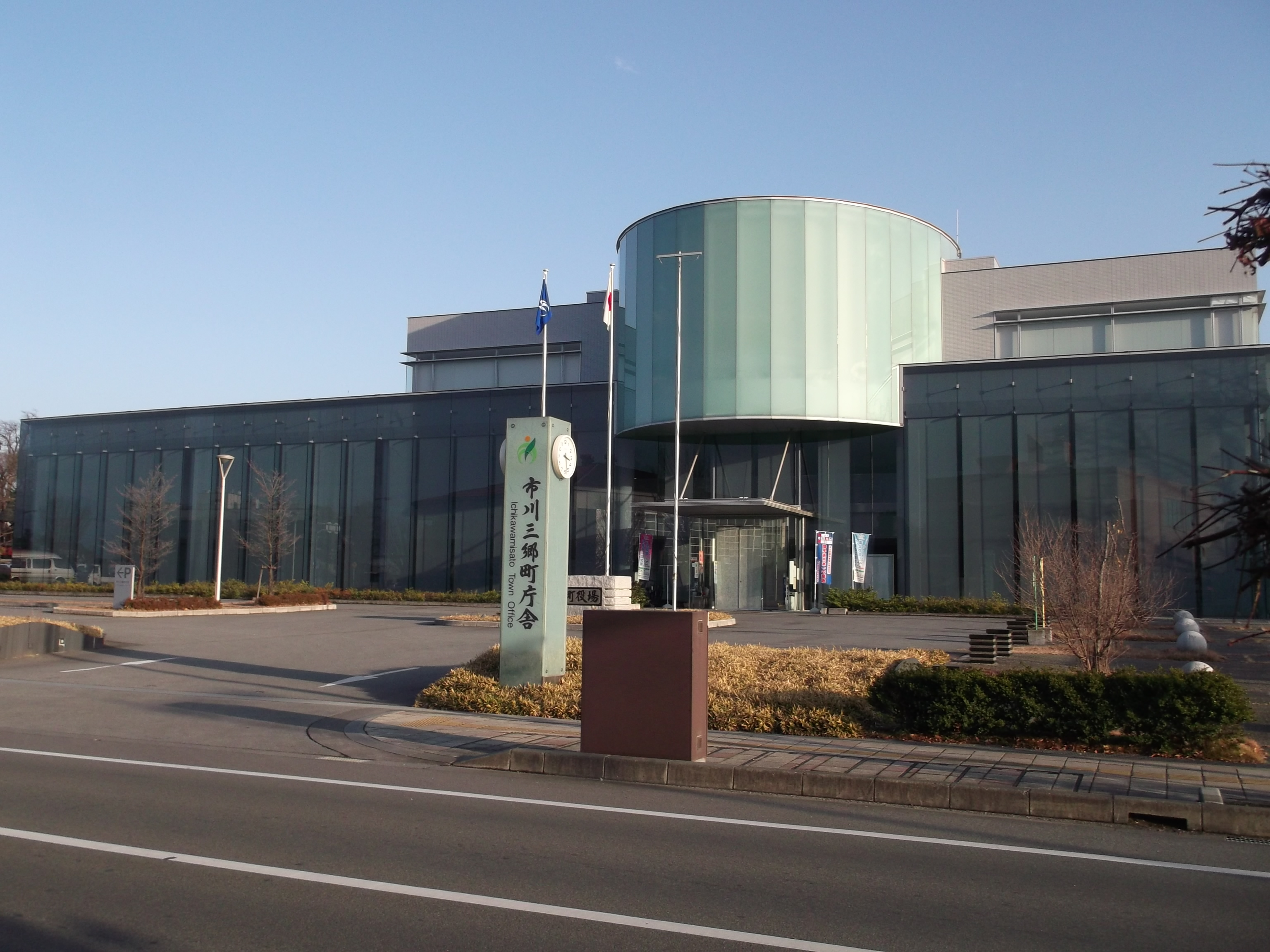
Ichikawamisato town hall

Ichikawamisato (市川三郷町, Ichikawamisato-chō) is a town located in Yamanashi Prefecture, Japan. As of 1 June 2019, the town had an estimated population of 15,799 in 6679 households., and a population density of 210 persons per km^{2}. The total area of the town is 75.18 square kilometres (29.03 sq mi).

== Geography ==
Ichikawamisato is located in south-central Yamanashi Prefecture at the southern end of the Kofu Basin. The Fuefuki River and the Kamanashi River flow through the town, which contains the confluence where these rivers join to form the Fuji River.

=== Neighboring municipalities ===
- Yamanashi Prefecture
  - Chūō
  - Fujikawa
  - Kōfu
  - Minami-Alps
  - Minobu

=== Climate ===
The town has a climate characterized by characterized by hot and humid summers, and relatively mild winters (Köppen climate classification Cfa). The average annual temperature in Ichikawamisato is 28-32 °C in summer and ?? in winter. The average annual rainfall is 16413 mm with September as the wettest month.

== Demographics ==
Per Japanese census data, the population of Ichikawamisato has declined over the past 60 years.

Historical population
Year	Pop.	±%
1960	25,078	—
1970	23,056	−8.1%
1980	21,985	−4.6%
1990	20,641	−6.1%
2000	18,854	−8.7%
2010	17,111	−9.2%
2020	14,700	−14.1%

== History ==
The area of Ichikawamisato was part of a huge shoen during the Heian period controlled by Minamoto no Yoshikiyo, the ancestor of the Takeda clan. In the Edo period, along with the rest of Kai Province, the area was tenryō territory controlled directly by the Tokugawa shogunate. After the Meiji restoration, the area was organized into villages within Nishiyatsushiro District, Yamanashi with the establishment of the modern municipalities system on July 1, 1889. On October 1, 2005, the towns of Ichikawadaimon, Mitama and Rokugō (all from Nishiyatsushiro District) merged to form the new town of Ichikawamisato.

== Economy ==
The economy of Ichikawamisato is primarily agricultural. The town was traditionally famous for its production of fireworks and Japanese traditional paper (washi).

== Education ==
Ichikawamisato has six public elementary schools and four public middle schools run by the town government and one public high school operated by the Yamanashi Prefectural Board of Education.

== Transportation ==
=== Railway ===
- Central Japan Railway Company - Minobu Line
  - Kai-Iwama - Ochii - Kajikazawaguchi - Ichikawa-Daimon - Ichikawa-Hommachi - Ashigawa - Kai-Ueno

=== Highway ===
- National Route 140
- National Route 358

== Sister cities ==
- Muscatine, Iowa, United States
