= Minobu Line =

Railway line in Japan

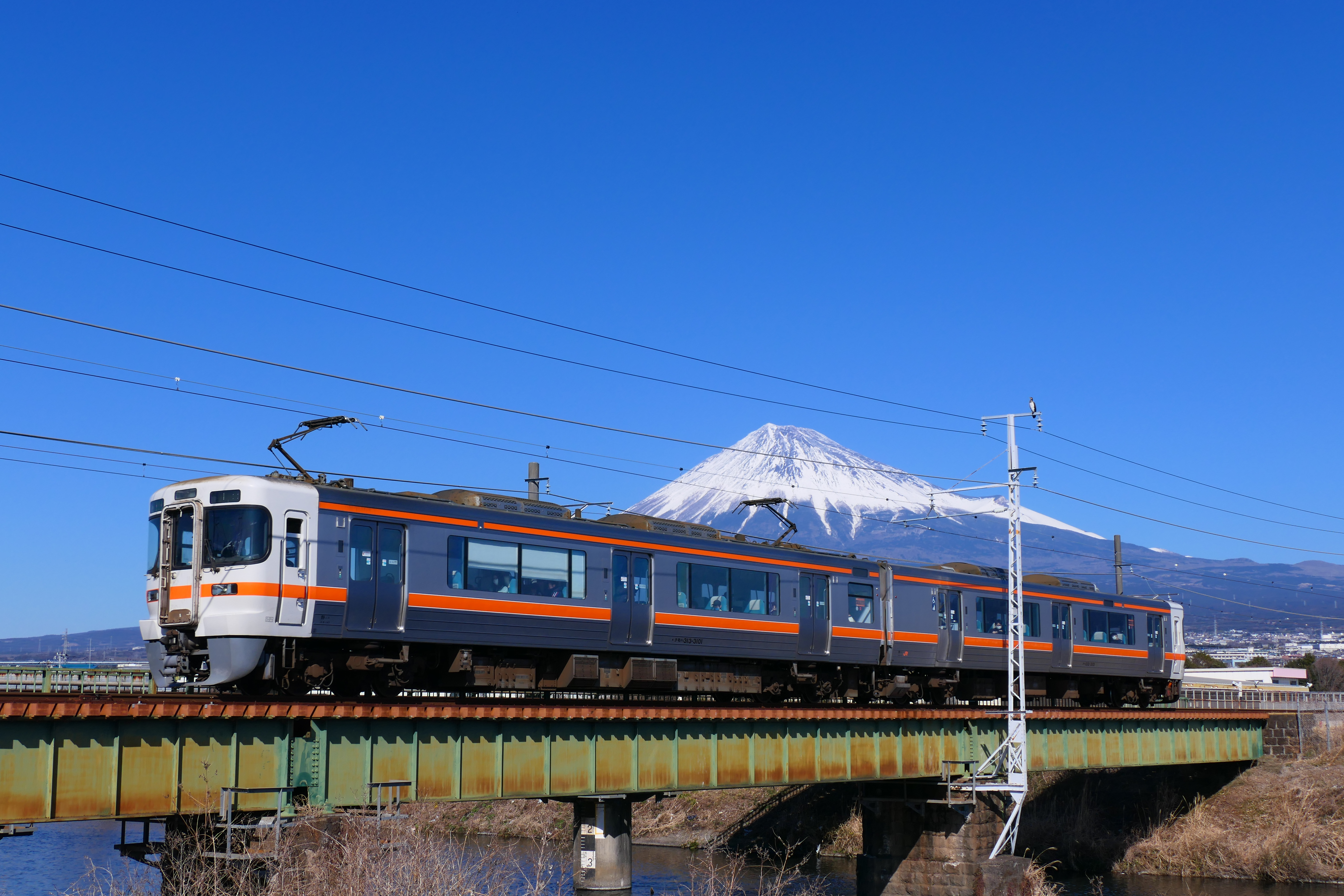
- JR Central 313 series EMU on the Minobu Line in February 2021

Overview
- Owner: JR Central
- Termini: Fuji; Kōfu
- Stations: 39

Service
- Type: Heavy rail
- Operator(s): JR Central

History
- Opened: 1890; 136 years ago
- Last extension: 30 March 1928

Technical
- Line length: 88.4 km (54.9 mi)
- Track gauge: 1,067 mm (3 ft 6 in)
- Electrification: 1,500 V DC (overhead line)
- Operating speed: 85 km/h (53 mph)
- Signalling: Automatic Closed block
- Train protection system: ATS-PT
- Maximum incline: 2.5%

The Minobu Line (身延線, Minobu-sen) is a railway line in the Tōkai region of Japan operated by the Central Japan Railway Company (JR Central). It runs between Fuji Station in Fuji, Shizuoka and Kōfu Station in Kōfu, Yamanashi, connecting the Tōkaidō Main Line to the Chūō Main Line.

== History ==
The Fuji Horse Tramway (富士馬車鉄道, Fuji Basha Tetsudō) opened a line from Suzukawa (now Yoshiwara) on the Tōkaidō Main Line to Ōmiya (now Fujinomiya), the southern end of the current route, in 1890.

Fuji Minobu Railway (富士身延鉄道, Fuji Minobu Tetsudō) purchased the tramway in 1912, and converted it to a steam railway the following year, gradually extending the line to Minobu, a distance of 26.9 miles (43.3 km) by 1920. In 1927, the line was electrified, and in 1928 extended to Kōfu on the Chūō Main Line completing the line with a distance of 54.7 miles (88.0 km).

In 1938, the Minobu Line was leased by the government, and nationalized in 1941. The alignment at Fuji was changed in 1968 to allow through trains to operate from Tokyo without requiring a reversal of direction, and the Fuji–Fujinomiya section was double-tracked between 1969 and 1974.

CTC signalling was commissioned in 1982, and freight services ceased in 1987, the year that Central Japan Railway Company (JR Central) took over operations of the Minobu Line following privatization of Japanese National Railways.

=== Former connecting lines ===
- Fujinomiya station - The Fuji Horse Tramway operated a 20 km 610mm gauge line to Kami-ide between 1909 and 1939.

Outside and inside trains on the Minobu Line, 2025

== Operation ==
The Fujikawa limited express service operates between Kōfu and Shizuoka via Fuji using JR Central 373 series EMU trains. Other trains are all-stations "Local" services, with higher frequencies on the Fuji - Nishi-Fujinomiya and Kajikazawaguchi - Kōfu sections compared to the section in between. 313 series and 211 series EMUs are used on local services.

== Stations ==
Stations marked with "｜" only local services stop. Stations marked with "●" local and Fujikawa limited express services stop.

No.	Name		Distance (km)	Fujikawa	Connections	Location	
CC00	Fuji	富士	0.0	●	Tōkaidō Main Line	Fuji	Shizuoka; Prefecture
CC01	Yunoki	柚木	1.5	｜		Fuji	Shizuoka; Prefecture
CC02	Tatebori	竪堀	2.8	｜		Fuji	Shizuoka; Prefecture
CC03	Iriyamase	入山瀬	5.6	｜		Fuji	Shizuoka; Prefecture
CC04	Fujine	富士根	8.0	｜		Fuji	Shizuoka; Prefecture
CC05	Gendōji	源道寺	9.3	｜		Fujinomiya	Shizuoka; Prefecture
CC06	Fujinomiya	富士宮	10.7	●		Fujinomiya	Shizuoka; Prefecture
CC07	Nishi-Fujinomiya	西富士宮	11.9	｜		Fujinomiya	Shizuoka; Prefecture
	Numakubo	沼久保	16.9	｜		Fujinomiya	Shizuoka; Prefecture
	Shibakawa	芝川	19.2	｜		Fujinomiya	Shizuoka; Prefecture
	Inako	稲子	24.0	｜		Fujinomiya	Shizuoka; Prefecture
	Tōshima	十島	26.3	｜		Nanbu	Yamanashi; Prefecture
	Ide	井出	29.4	｜		Nanbu	Yamanashi; Prefecture
	Yorihata	寄畑	31.9	｜		Nanbu	Yamanashi; Prefecture
	Utsubuna	内船	34.1	●		Nanbu	Yamanashi; Prefecture
	Kai-Ōshima	甲斐大島	39.8	｜		Minobu	Yamanashi; Prefecture
	Minobu	身延	43.5	●		Minobu	Yamanashi; Prefecture
	Shionosawa	塩之沢	45.7	｜		Minobu	Yamanashi; Prefecture
	Hadakajima	波高島	50.2	｜		Minobu	Yamanashi; Prefecture
	Shimobe-onsen	下部温泉	51.7	●		Minobu	Yamanashi; Prefecture
	Kai-Tokiwa	甲斐常葉	54.1	｜		Minobu	Yamanashi; Prefecture
	Ichinose	市ノ瀬	56.1	｜		Minobu	Yamanashi; Prefecture
	Kunado	久那土	58.8	｜		Minobu	Yamanashi; Prefecture
	Kai-Iwama	甲斐岩間	60.3	●		Ichikawamisato	Yamanashi; Prefecture
	Ochii	落居	61.8	｜		Ichikawamisato	Yamanashi; Prefecture
	Kajikazawaguchi	鰍沢口	66.8	●		Ichikawamisato	Yamanashi; Prefecture
	Ichikawa-Daimon	市川大門	69.8	●		Ichikawamisato	Yamanashi; Prefecture
	Ichikawa-Hommachi	市川本町	70.7	｜		Ichikawamisato	Yamanashi; Prefecture
	Ashigawa	芦川	71.7	｜		Ichikawamisato	Yamanashi; Prefecture
	Kai-Ueno	甲斐上野	72.8	｜		Ichikawamisato	Yamanashi; Prefecture
	Higashi-Hanawa	東花輪	76.3	●		Chūō	Yamanashi; Prefecture
	Koikawa	小井川	77.5	｜		Chūō	Yamanashi; Prefecture
	Jōei	常永	78.9	｜		Shōwa	Yamanashi; Prefecture
	Kokubo	国母	81.2	｜		Shōwa	Yamanashi; Prefecture
	Kai-Sumiyoshi	甲斐住吉	83.1	｜		Kōfu	Yamanashi; Prefecture
	Minami-Kōfu	南甲府	84.0	●		Kōfu	Yamanashi; Prefecture
	Zenkōji	善光寺	86.3	｜		Kōfu	Yamanashi; Prefecture
	Kanente	金手	87.2	｜		Kōfu	Yamanashi; Prefecture
	Kōfu	甲府	88.4	●	Chūō Main Line	Kōfu	Yamanashi; Prefecture

== See also ==
- List of railway lines in Japan
