= Kōfu Station =

Railway station in Kōfu, Yamanashi Prefecture, Japan

CO43 Kōfu Station 甲府駅
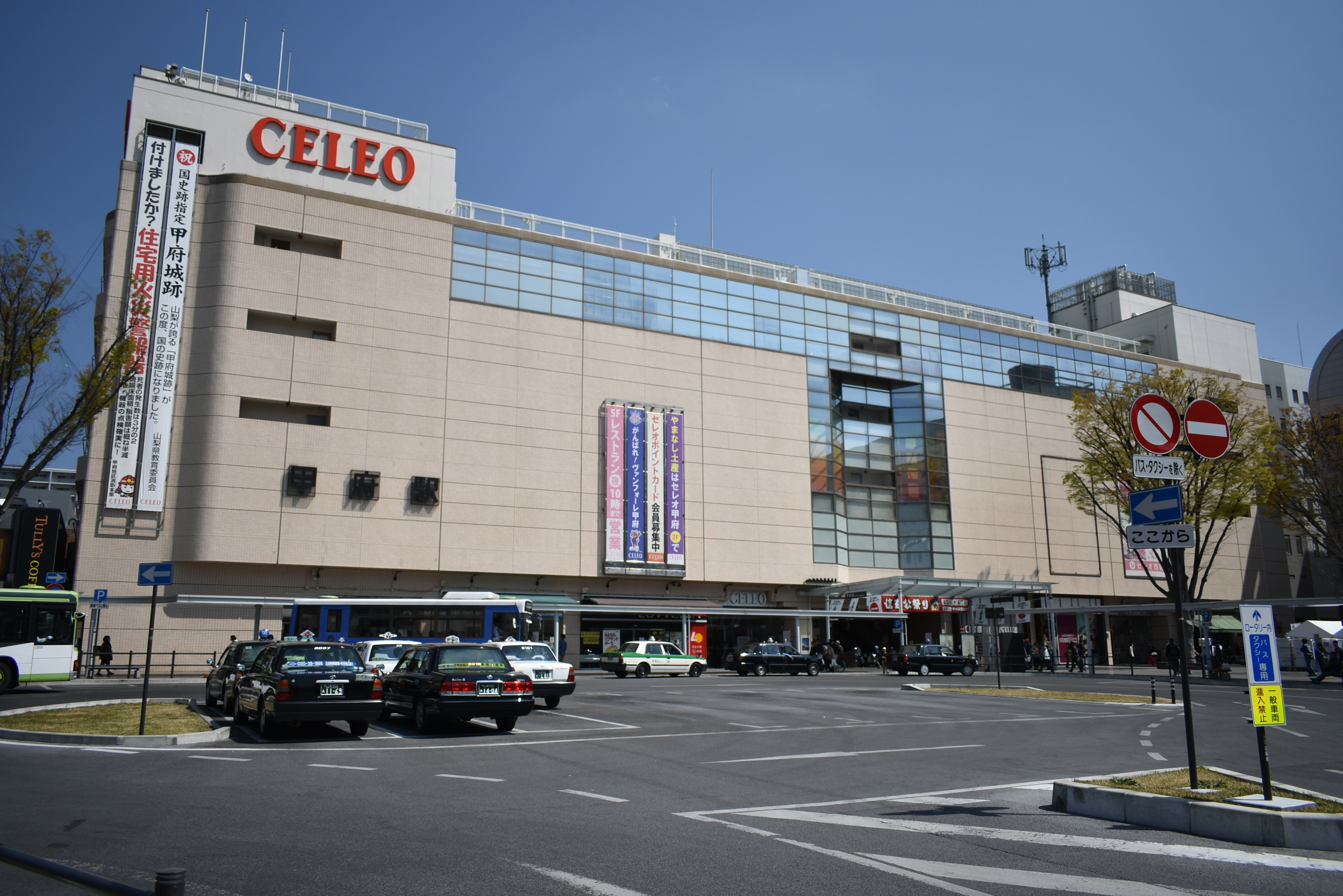
- Celeo building at the south side of the station, April 2019

General information
- Location: 1-8, Marunouchi 1-chome, Kōfu-shi, Yamanashi-ken; Japan
- Coordinates: 35°40′02″N 138°34′08″E
- Operator: JR East
- Lines: ■ Chūō Main Line; Minobu Line
- Distance: 134.1 km (83.3 mi) from Tokyo
- Platforms: 1 side + 2 island platforms
- Tracks: 5
- Train operators: JR East; JR Central

Other information
- Status: Staffed (Midori no Madoguchi)
- Website: Official website

History
- Opened: 11 June 1903; 123 years ago

Passengers
- FY2024: 27,926 (daily) ▲4.25%

Services
Preceding station	JR East	Following station
Nirasaki CO46 towards Hakuba	Azusa	Isawa-Onsen CO41 towards Chiba or Tokyo
Ryūō CO44 (limited service) Terminus	Kaiji	Isawa-Onsen CO41 towards Tokyo
Ryūō CO44 towards Shiojiri	Chūō Main Line Local	Sakaori CO42 towards Tachikawa
Preceding station	JR Central	Following station
Terminus	Fujikawa	Minami-Kōfu towards Shizuoka
Terminus	Minobu Line	Kanente towards Fuji
Location
- Location within Yamanashi Prefecture Location within Japan

Kōfu Station (甲府駅, Kōfu-eki) is the main railway station in the city of Kōfu, Yamanashi Prefecture, Japan. It is managed by the East Japan Railway Company (JR East).

== Lines ==
Kōfu Station is served by the JR East Chūō Main Line and is 134.1 kilometers from the starting point of the line at Tokyo. It is also the northern terminus of the 83.1 kilometer JR Central Minobu Line.

== Layout ==
The station has one side platform and two island platforms which are shared by both JR East and JR Central. The ticket offices and gates are located on a bridge over the tracks. The station has a Midori no Madoguchi staffed ticket office.

=== Platforms ===
1, 2, 3	■ Chūō Main Line	For Nirasaki, Kobuchizawa, Kami-Suwa and Matsumoto; For Ōtsuki, Hachiōji and Shinjuku
4, 5	■ Minobu Line	For Kajikazawaguchi, Minobu and Fuji

== History ==
Kōfu Station was opened on 11 June 1903 with the extension of government railway (later named Chūō Main Line) from Hajikano Station (now Kai-Yamato Station). The line was later extended from Kōfu Station to Nirasaki Station on 15 December 1903. The privately owned Fuji-Minobu Railway connected Ichikawa-Daimon Station to Kōfu on 30 March 1928. This line was nationalized on 1 May 1941, becoming the Minobu Line. All freight operations were discontinued from 1 February 1984. Along with the division and privatization of JNR on 1 April 1987, the station came under the joint control of the East Japan Railway Company.

== Passenger statistics ==
In fiscal 2017, the station was used by an average of 15,090 passengers daily (boarding passengers only).

== Surrounding area ==
Kōfu Station is located in the heart of Kofu City. Nearby places include:

- Yamanashi Science Museum
- Takeda Shrine
- Yamanashi Prefectural Assembly
- Kōfu City Hall
