= Fuji Station =

Railway station in Fuji, Shizuoka Prefecture, Japan

CA08 CC00 Fuji Station 富士駅
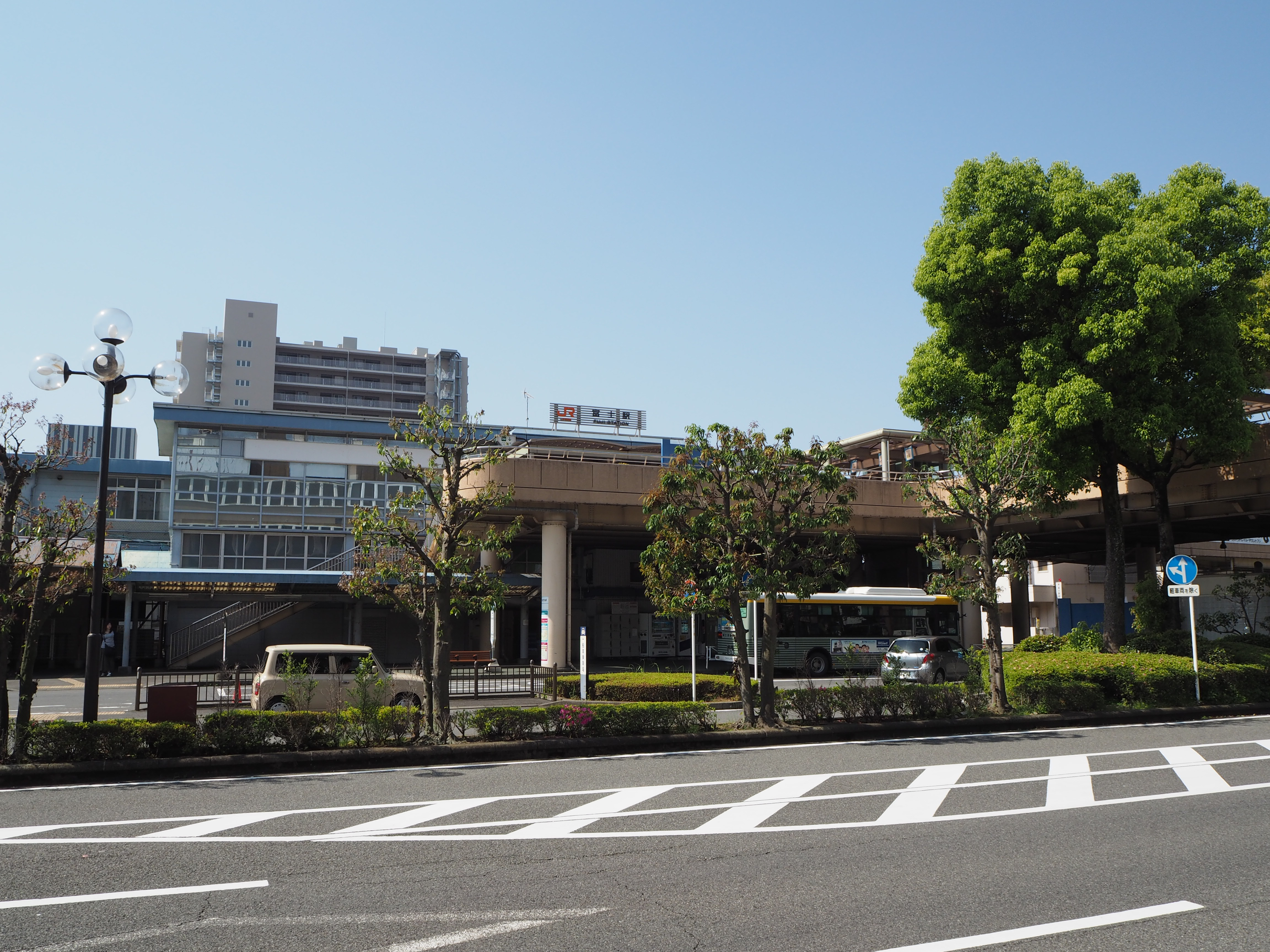
- Fuji Station north exit April 2018

General information
- Location: Honchō 1-1, Fuji City, Shizuoka Prefecture; Japan
- Coordinates: 35.151486°N 138.6512375°E
- Operator: JR Central; Japan Freight
- Lines: Tōkaidō Main Line; Minobu Line
- Distance: 146.2 km (90.8 mi) from Tokyo
- Platforms: 3 island platforms
- Tracks: 6

Construction
- Structure type: At grade

Other information
- Status: Staffed
- Station code: CA08; CC00
- Website: Official website

History
- Opened: 21 April 1909; 117 years ago

Passengers
- 2017: 8,462 daily
Location
- Location within Shizuoka Prefecture Location within Central Japan Location within Japan

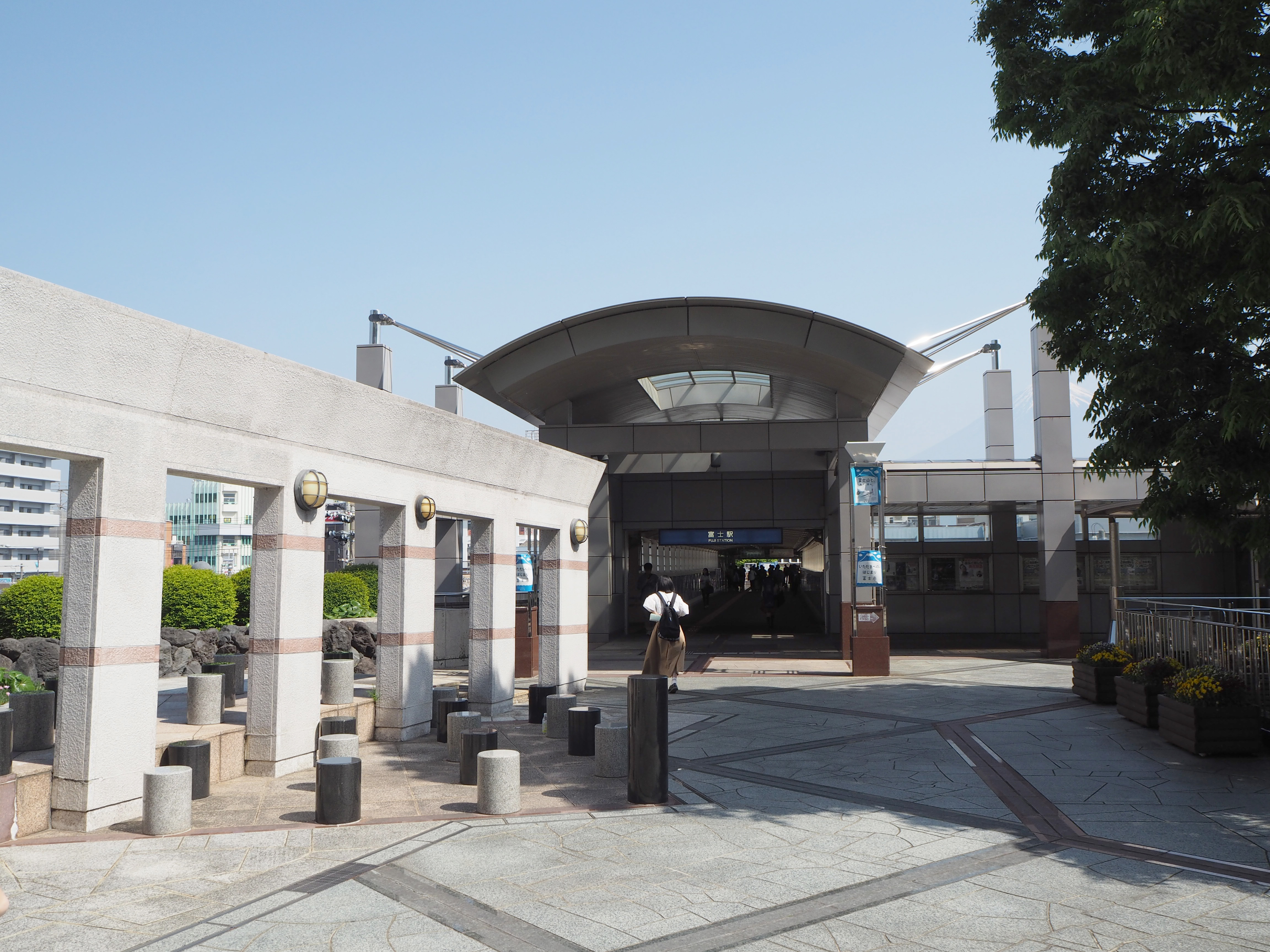
Fuji Station, south exit April 2018

Fuji Station (富士駅, Fuji-eki) is an interchange railway station in the city of Fuji, Shizuoka Prefecture, Japan operated by Central Japan Railway Company (JR Tōkai).

== Lines ==
Fuji Station is served by the JR Tōkai Tōkaidō Main Line, and is located 146.2 kilometers from the official starting point of the line at Tokyo. It is also the southern terminus of the Minobu Line. The station also is a freight terminal for the Japan Freight Railway Company.

== Station layout ==
Fuji Station has three island platforms serving six tracks, which are connected each other a footbridge, which leads to station building, which is also constructed over the tracks. The station building has automated ticket machines, TOICA automated turnstiles and a staffed "Midori no Madoguchi" service counter.

=== Platforms ===
1	■ Minobu Line	Fujinomiya・Minobu・Kōfu
2	■ Limited Express Fujikawa	Shizuoka・Fujinomiya・Minobu・Kōfu
3	■ Tōkaidō Main Line	Shizuoka ・ Shimada ・ Hamamatsu ・ Numazu ・ Atami
4	■ Home Liner Numazu	Numazu
5	■ Limited Express Nagara	Shizuoka・ Nagoya ・Ogaki
6	■ Tōkaidō Main Line	Numazu ・ Atami

== Adjacent stations ==
«	Service	»
Central Japan Railway Company
Tōkaidō Main Line CA08
Shizuoka CA17	Sleeper Limited Express Sunrise Seto & Sunrise Izumo	Numazu CA03
Shimizu CA14	Limited Express Fujikawa	Minobu Line
Shimizu CA14	Home Liner	Numazu CA03
Fujikawa CA09	Local	Yoshiwara CA07
Minobu Line CC00
Tōkaidō Main Line	Limited Express Fujikawa	Fujinomiya CC06
Terminus	Local	Yunoki CC01

== History ==
In 1889, when the section of the Tōkaidō Main Line connecting Shizuoka with Kōzu was completed, stations were built at Suzukawa (Yoshiwara) and Iwabuchi (Fujikawa), with Kashima village in between without a train station. Due to the strong petition of the local residents, and political pressure applied by Oji Paper Company, who had established a paper mill nearby, a station was opened on April 21, 1909, and named “Fuji Station”. The terminus of the Minobu Line was established at Fuji Station on July 13, 1913. The station building was rebuilt in 1964. Container freight services began operations from 1994.

Station numbering was introduced in March 2018; Fuji Station was assigned station number CA09 for the Tōkaidō Line and CC00 for the Minobu Line.

== Passenger statistics ==
In fiscal 2017, the station was used by an average of 9462 passengers daily (boarding passengers only).

== See also ==
- List of railway stations in Japan
