= Hadakajima Station =

Railway station in Minobu, Yamanashi Prefecture, Japan

Hadakajima Station 波高島駅
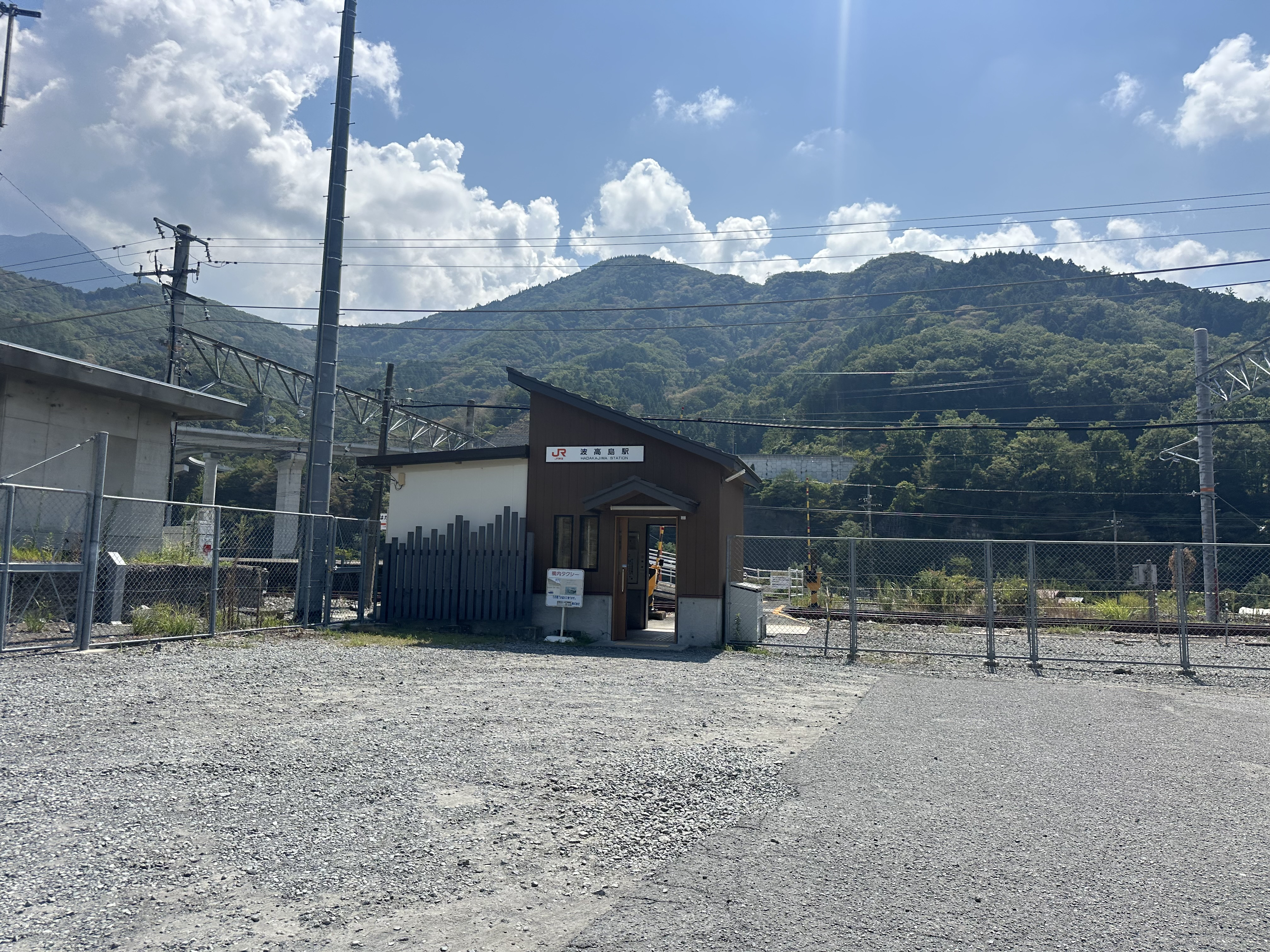
- JR Hadakajima Station, August 2024

General information
- Location: 608 Hadakajima, Minobu-cho, Minamikoma-gun, Yamanashi-ken; Japan
- Coordinates: 35.4181°N 138.4596°E
- Operator: JR Central
- Line: Minobu Line
- Distance: 50.2 kilometers from Fuji
- Platforms: 1 island platform

Other information
- Status: Unstaffed

History
- Opened: December 17, 1927
- Former names: Kai-Shimoyama (to 1930); Shimoyama-Hadakajima (to 1938)

Passengers
- 2016: 40 daily
Location
- Location within Yamanashi Prefecture Location within Japan

Hadakajima Station (波高島駅, Hadakajima-eki) is a railway station on the Minobu Line of Central Japan Railway Company (JR Central) located in the town of Minobu, Minamikoma District, Yamanashi Prefecture, Japan.

== Info ==
=== Lines ===
Hadakajima Station is served by the Minobu Line and is located 50.2 kilometers from the southern terminus of the line at Fuji Station.

=== Layout ===
Hadakajima Station has a single island platform serving 2 tracks connected to the station building by a level crossing. The station is unattended.

=== Platform ===
1	■ Minobu Line	For Kōfu
2	■ Minobu Line	For Fuji, Minobu

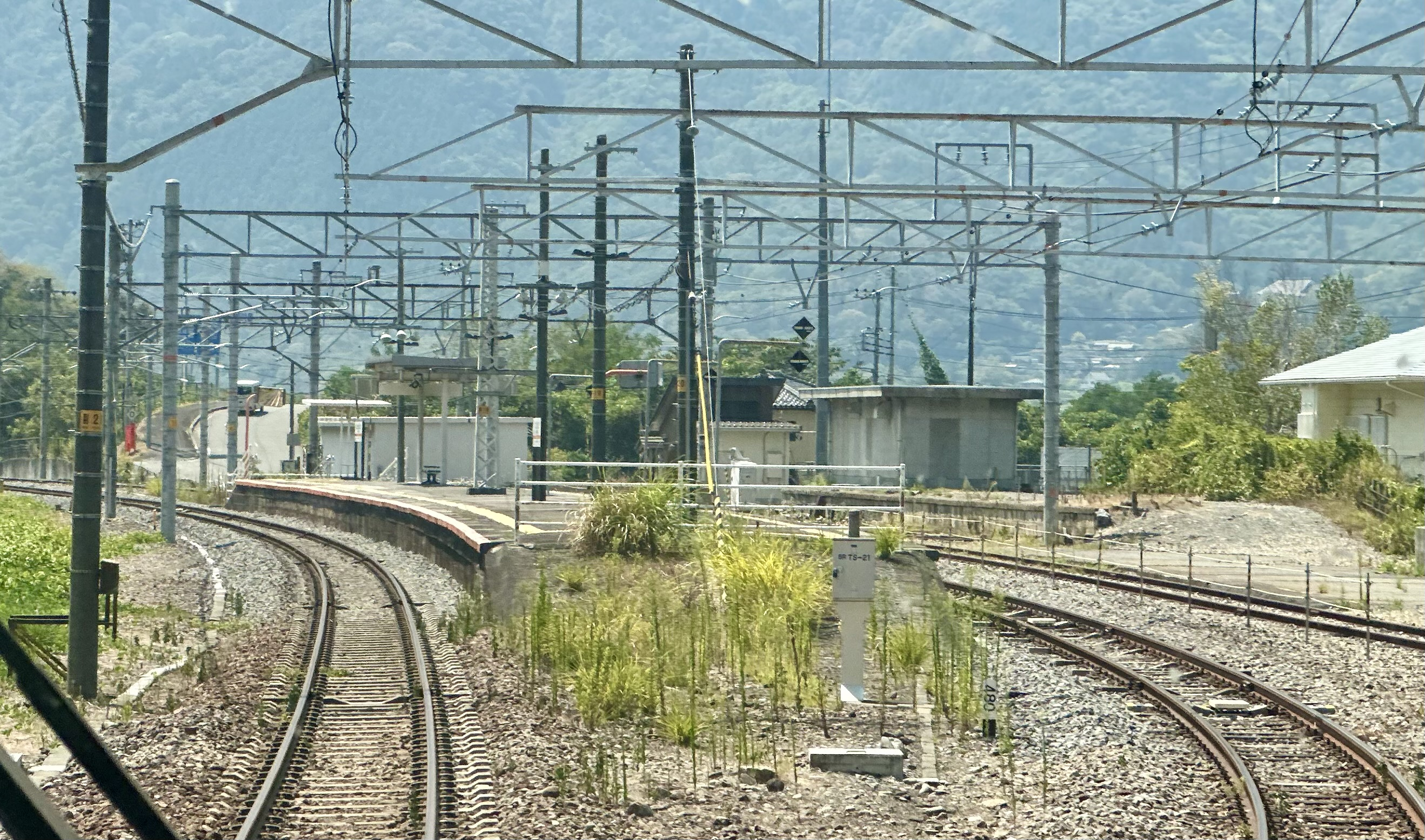

=== Adjacent stations ===
«	Service	»
Minobu Line
Limited Express Fujikawa: Does not stop at this station
Shionosawa	Local	Shimobe-onsen

== History ==
Hadakajima Station was opened on December 17, 1927, as Kai-Shimoyama Station (甲斐下山駅, Kai-Shimoyama-eki) on the original Fuji-Minobu Line. It was renamed Shimoyama-Hadakajima Station (下山波高島駅, Shimoyama-Hadakajima-eki) in 1930 and renamed again to its present name on October 1, 1938. The line came under control of the Japanese Government Railways on May 1, 1941. The JGR became the JNR (Japan National Railway) after World War II. Along with the division and privatization of JNR on April 1, 1987, the station came under the control and operation of the Central Japan Railway Company.

== Surrounding area ==
- Tokiwa River

== See also ==
- List of railway stations in Japan
