= Kai-Tokiwa Station =

Railway station in Minobu, Yamanashi Prefecture, Japan

Kai-Tokiwa Station 甲斐常葉駅
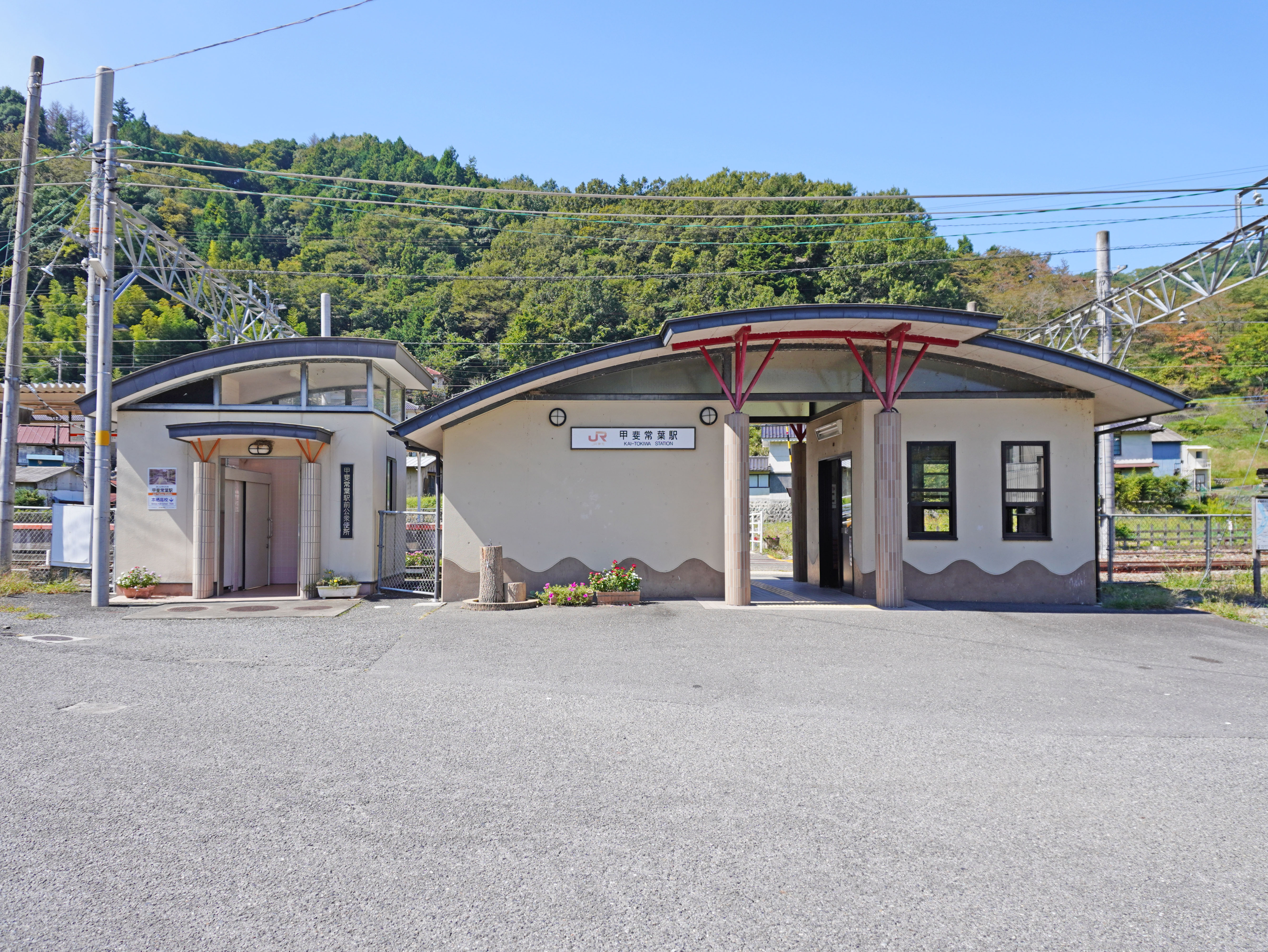
- Kai-Tokiwa Station, October 2022

General information
- Location: Tokiwa, Minobu-cho, Minamikoma-gun, Yamanashi-ken; Japan
- Coordinates: 35.4449°N 138.4769°E
- Operator: JR Central
- Line: Minobu Line
- Distance: 54.1 kilometers from Fuji
- Platforms: 1 island platform

Other information
- Status: Unstaffed

History
- Opened: December 17, 1927

Passengers
- FY2016: 30 daily
Location
- Location within Yamanashi Prefecture Location within Japan

Kai-Tokiwa Station (甲斐常葉駅, Kai-Tokiwa-eki) is a railway station on the Minobu Line of Central Japan Railway Company (JR Central) located in the town of Minobu, Minamikoma District, Yamanashi Prefecture, Japan.

== Lines ==
Kai-Tokiwa Station is served by the Minobu Line and is located 54.1 kilometers from the southern terminus of the line at Fuji Station.

== Layout ==
Kai-Tokiwa Station has a single island platform serving 2 tracks connected to the station building by a level crossing. The station is unattended.

=== Platform ===
1	■ Minobu Line	For Fuji, Minobu
2	■ Minobu Line	For Kōfu

== Adjacent stations ==
«	Service	»
Minobu Line
Limited Express Fujikawa: Does not stop at this station
Shimobe-onsen	Local	Ichinose

== History ==
Kai-Tokiwa Station was opened on December 17, 1927 as a station on the original Fuji-Minobu Line. The line came under control of the Japanese Government Railways on May 1, 1941. The JGR became the JNR (Japan National Railway) after World War II. Along with the division and privatization of JNR on April 1, 1987, the station came under the control and operation of the Central Japan Railway Company.

== Surrounding area ==
- former Shimobe Town Hall
- Shimobe onsen

== See also ==
- List of railway stations in Japan
