= Tōshima Station =

Railway station in Nanbu, Yamanashi Prefecture, Japan

Tōshima Station 十島駅
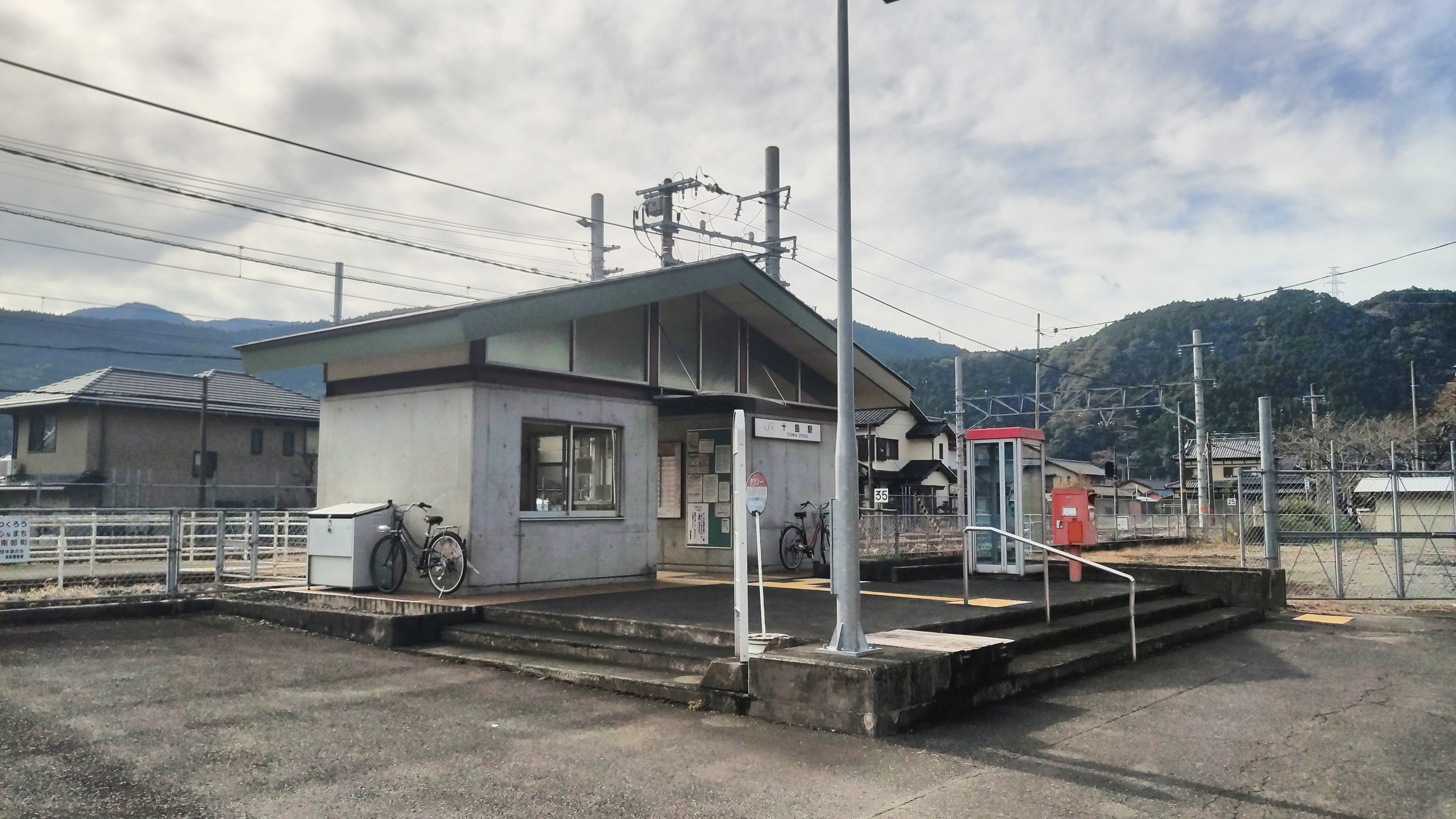
- Tōshima Station, November 2021

General information
- Location: Tōshima, Nanbu-cho, Minamikoma-gun, Yamanashi-ken; Japan
- Coordinates: 35.2301°N 138.5157°E
- Operator: JR Central
- Line: Minobu Line
- Distance: 26.3 kilometers from Fuji
- Platforms: 1 island platform

Other information
- Status: Unstaffed

History
- Opened: August 10, 1918

Passengers
- FY2016: 31 daily
Location
- Location within Yamanashi Prefecture Location within Japan

Tōshima Station (十島駅, Tōshima-eki) is a railway station on the Minobu Line of Central Japan Railway Company (JR Central) located in the town of Nanbu, Minamikoma District, Yamanashi Prefecture, Japan.

== Lines ==
Tōshima Station is served by the Minobu Line and is located 26.3 kilometers from the southern terminus of the line at Fuji Station.

== Layout ==
Tōshima Station has a single island platform, connected to a two-story concrete station building with a waiting room by a level crossing. The station is unattended.

=== Platform ===
1	■ Minobu Line	For Fujinomiya, Fuji
2	■ Minobu Line	For Minobu, Kōfu

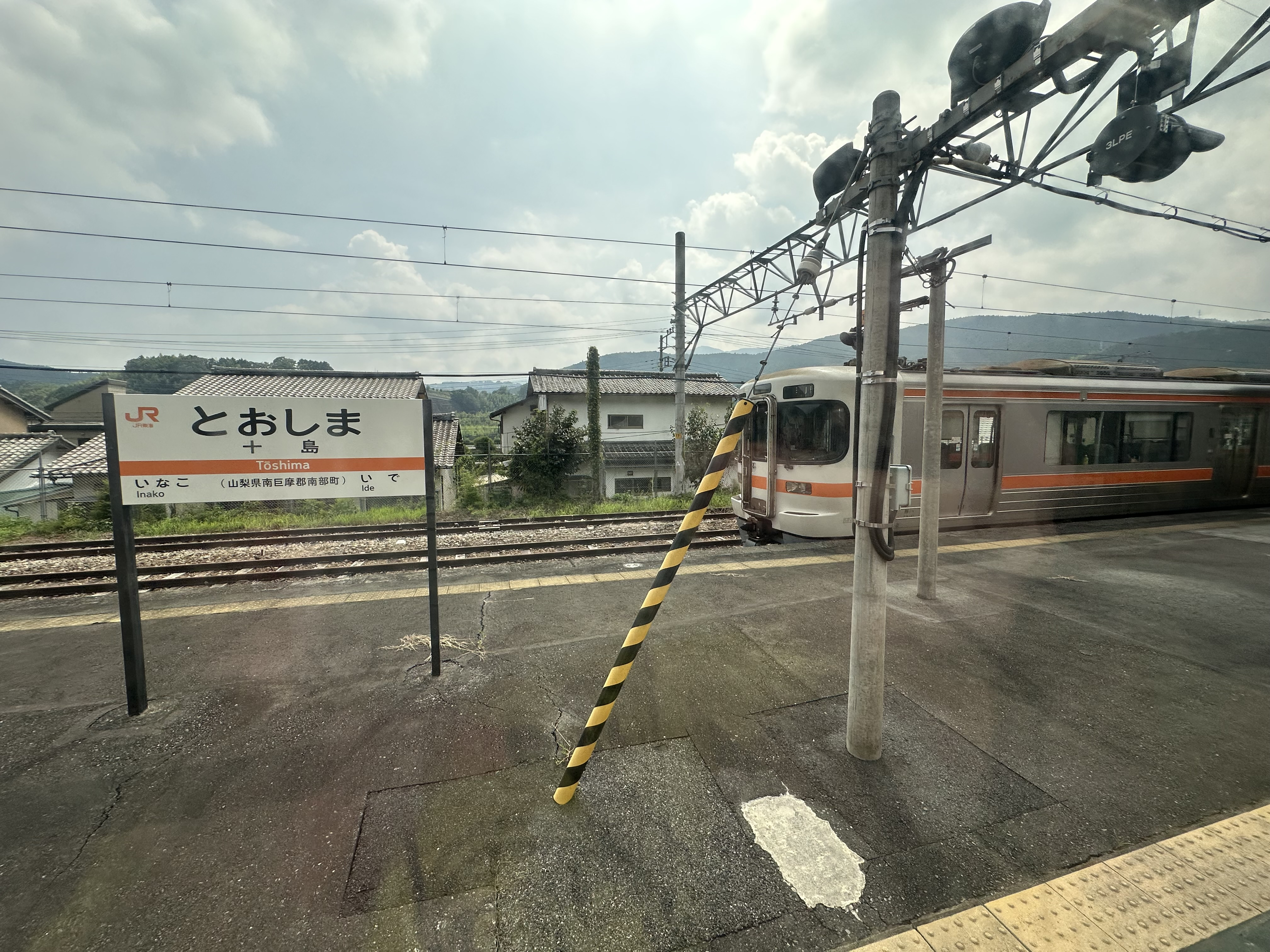

== Adjacent stations ==
«	Service	»
Minobu Line
Inako	Local	Ide

== History ==
Tōshima Station was opened on August 10, 1918 as a terminal siding of the original Fuji-Minobu Line. The line was extended to Ustubuna a couple months later in October 1918. Tōshima was elevated to the status of a full station on June 22, 1936. The line came under control of the Japanese Government Railways on May 1, 1941. The JGR became the JNR (Japan National Railway) after World War II. The station has been unattended since June 1, 1983. Along with the division and privatization of JNR on April 1, 1987, the station came under the control and operation of the Central Japan Railway Company. The station building was rebuilt in March 1994.

== Surrounding area ==
- Fuji River
- National Route 52

== See also ==
- List of railway stations in Japan
