= Ichinose Station =

Railway station in Minobu, Yamanashi Prefecture, Japan

Ichinose Station 市ノ瀬駅
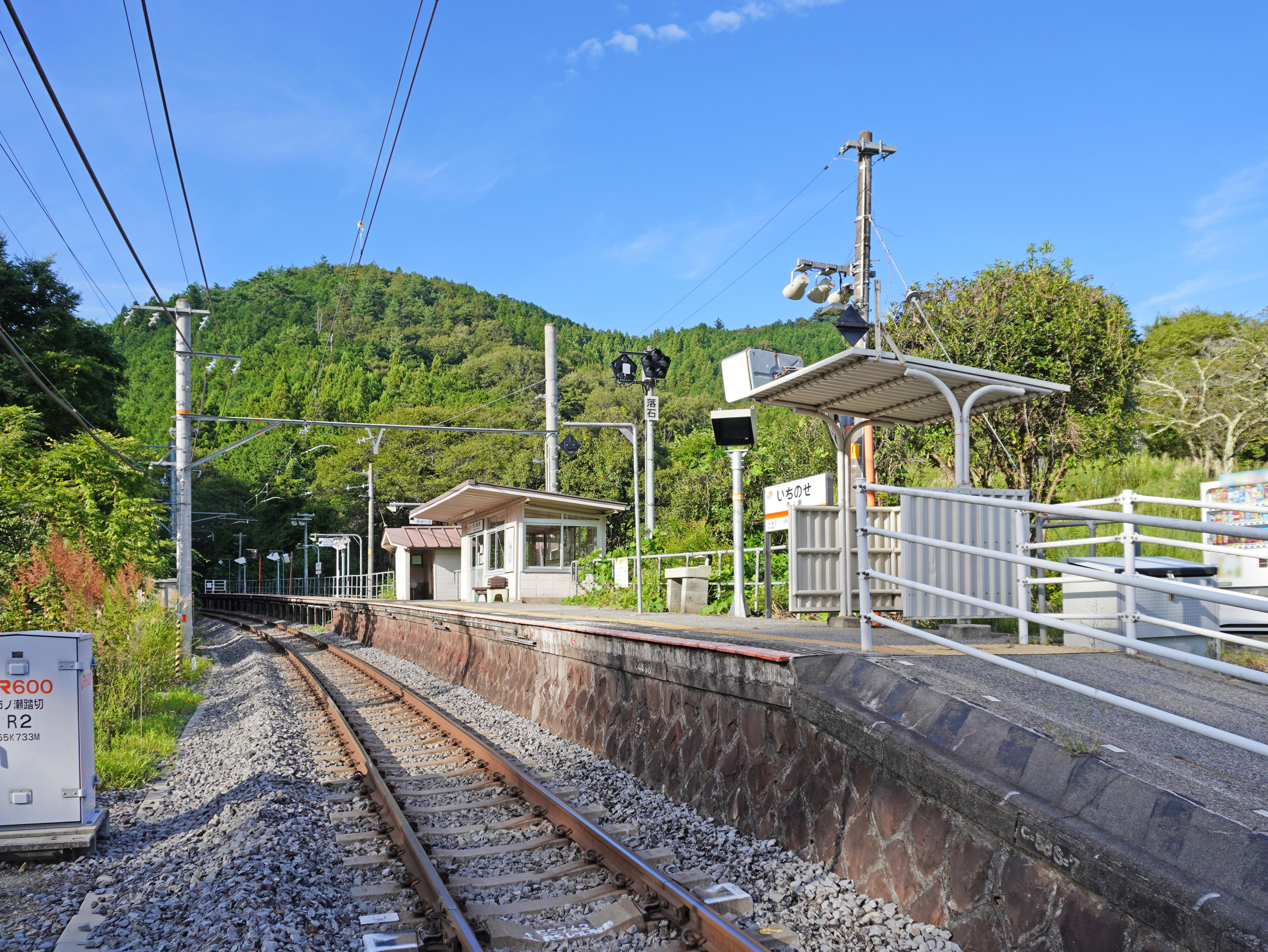
- Ichinose Station, September 2022

General information
- Location: Ichinose, Minobu-cho, Minamikoma-gun, Yamanashi-ken; Japan
- Coordinates: 35.4621°N 138.4821°E
- Operator: JR Central
- Line: Minobu Line
- Distance: 56.1 kilometers from Fuji
- Platforms: 1 side platform

Other information
- Status: Unstaffed

History
- Opened: May 10, 1932

Passengers
- FY2016: 11 daily
Location
- Location within Yamanashi Prefecture Location within Japan

Ichinose Station (市ノ瀬駅, Ichinose-eki) is a railway station on the Minobu Line of Central Japan Railway Company (JR Central) located in the town of Minobu, Minamikoma District, Yamanashi Prefecture, Japan.

== Lines ==
Ichinose Station is served by the Minobu Line and is located 56.1 kilometers from the southern terminus of the line at Fuji Station.

== Layout ==
Ichinose Station has one side platform serving a single bi-directional track. There is no station building, but only a small rain shelter on the platform, and a separate toilet. The station is unattended.

== Adjacent stations ==
| « | Service | » |
Minobu Line
Limited Express Fujikawa: Does not stop at this station
| Kai-Tokiwa | Local | Kunado |

== History ==
Ichinose Station was opened on May 10, 1932 as a station on the original Fuji-Minobu Line. It has been unattended since the day of its opening. The line came under control of the Japanese Government Railways on May 1, 1941. The JGR became the JNR (Japan National Railway) after World War II. Along with the division and privatization of JNR on April 1, 1987, the station came under the control and operation of the Central Japan Railway Company.

== Surrounding area ==
- The station is located in a rural area with only 3-4 houses nearby.

== See also ==
- List of railway stations in Japan
