= Kai-Iwama Station =

Railway station in Ichikawamisato, Yamanashi Prefecture, Japan

Kai-Iwama Station 甲斐岩間駅
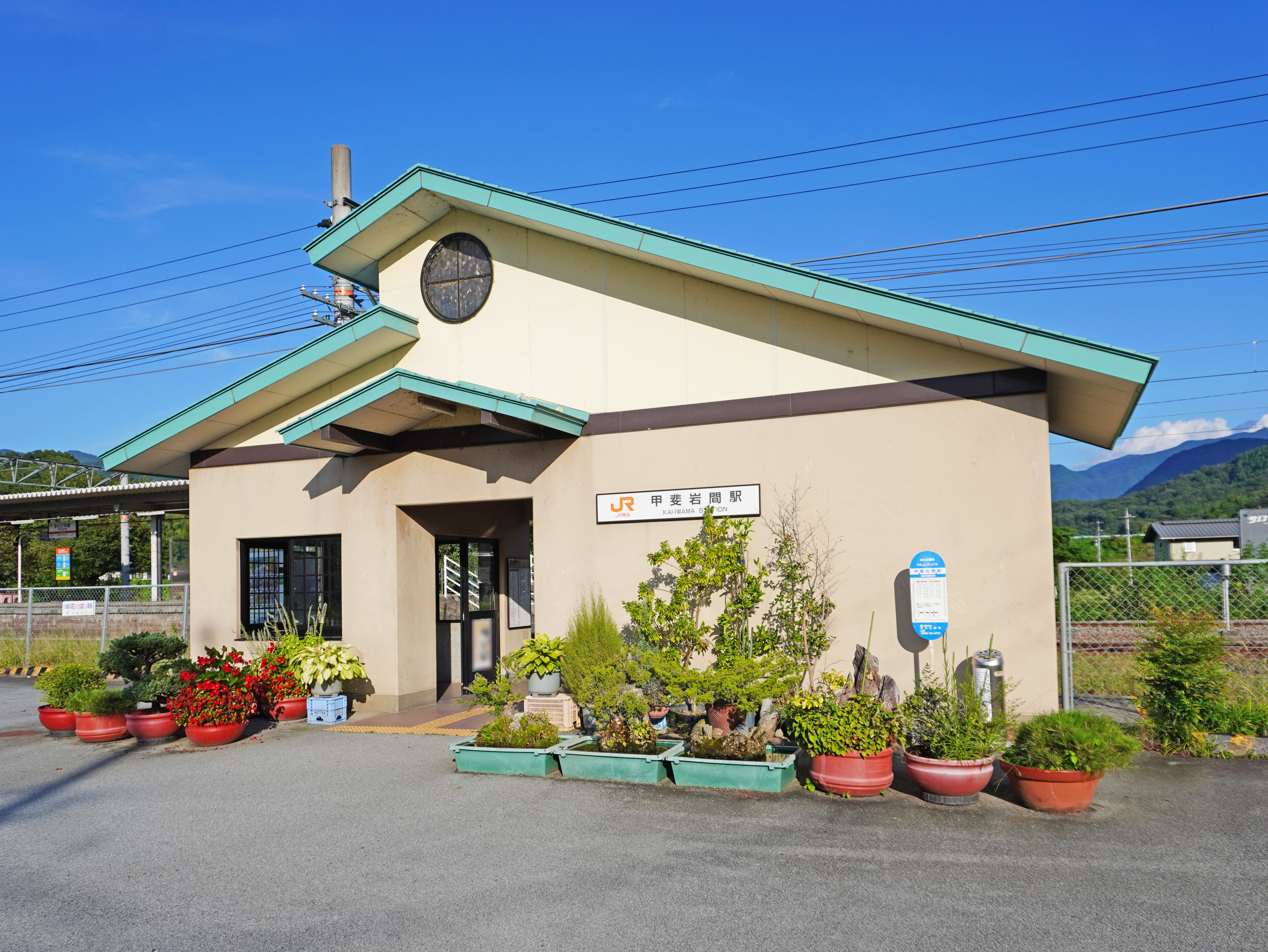
- Kai-Iwama Station, September 2022

General information
- Location: 948 Iwama, Ichikawamisato-chi, Nishiyatsushiro-gun, Yamanashi-ken; Japan
- Coordinates: 35.4924°N 138.4628°E
- Operator: JR Central
- Line: Minobu Line
- Distance: 60.3 kilometers from Fuji
- Platforms: 1 island platform

Other information
- Status: Unstaffed

History
- Opened: December 17, 1927

Passengers
- FY 2016: 177 daily
Location
- Location within Yamanashi Prefecture Location within Japan

Kai-Iwama Station (甲斐岩間駅, Kai-Iwama-eki) is a train station on the Minobu Line of Central Japan Railway Company (JR Central) located in the town of Ichikawamisato, Nishiyatsushiro District, Yamanashi Prefecture, Japan.

== Lines ==
Kai-Iwama Station is served by the Minobu Line and is located 60.3 kilometers from the southern terminus of the line at Fuji Station.

== Layout ==
Kai-Iwama Station has one island platform connected to the station building by a level crossing. The station is unattended.

=== Platforms ===
1	■ Minobu Line	For Kōfu
2	■ Minobu Line	For Fuji, Minobu

== Adjacent stations ==
«	Service	»
Minobu Line
Shimobe-onsen	Limited Express Fujikawa	Kajikazawaguchi
Kunado	Local	Ochii

== History ==
Kai-Iwama Station was opened on December 17, 1927, as a station on the Fuji-Minobu Line. The line came under control of the Japanese Government Railways on May 1, 1941. The JGR became the JNR (Japan National Railway) after World War II. Along with the division and privatization of JNR on April 1, 1987, the station came under the control and operation of the Central Japan Railway Company. The station has been unattended since April 1, 1999. The station building was rebuilt in May 2005.

== Surrounding area ==
- former Rokugo Town Hall

== See also ==
- List of railway stations in Japan
