= Utsubuna Station =

Railway station in Nanbu, Yamanashi Prefecture, Japan

Utsubuna Station 内船駅
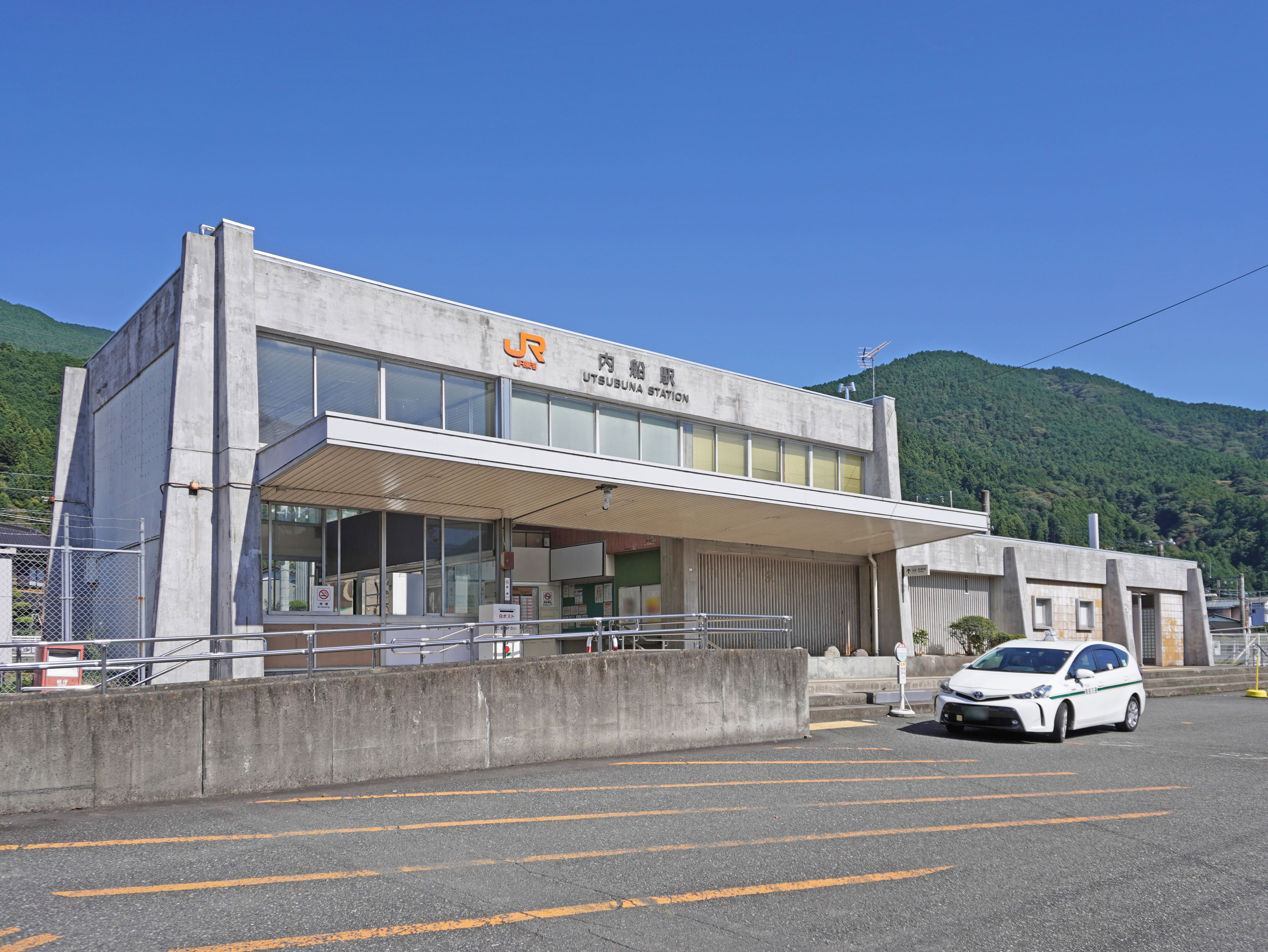
- Utsubuna Station, September 2022

General information
- Location: 7200 Utsubuna, Nanbu-cho, Minamikoma-gun, Yamanashi-ken 409-2305; Japan
- Coordinates: 35.2823°N 138.4643°E
- Operator: JR Central
- Line: Minobu Line
- Distance: 34.1 kilometers from Fuji
- Platforms: 1 island platform

Other information
- Status: Unstaffed

History
- Opened: October 8, 1918
- Former names: Utsubuna-Nanbu (until 1938)

Passengers
- FY2016: 150 daily
Location
- Location within Yamanashi Prefecture Location within Japan

Utsubuna Station (内船駅, Utsubuna-eki) is a railway station on the Minobu Line of Central Japan Railway Company (JR Central) located in the town of Nanbu, Minamikoma District, Yamanashi Prefecture, Japan.

== Lines ==
Utsubuna Station is served by the Minobu Line and is located 34.1 kilometres from the southern terminus of the line at Fuji Station.

== Layout ==
Utsubuna Station has a single island platform, with a two-story concrete station building containing a waiting room. The station is unattended.

=== Platform ===
1	■ Minobu Line	For Fujinomiya, Fuji
2	■ Minobu Line	For Minobu, Kōfu

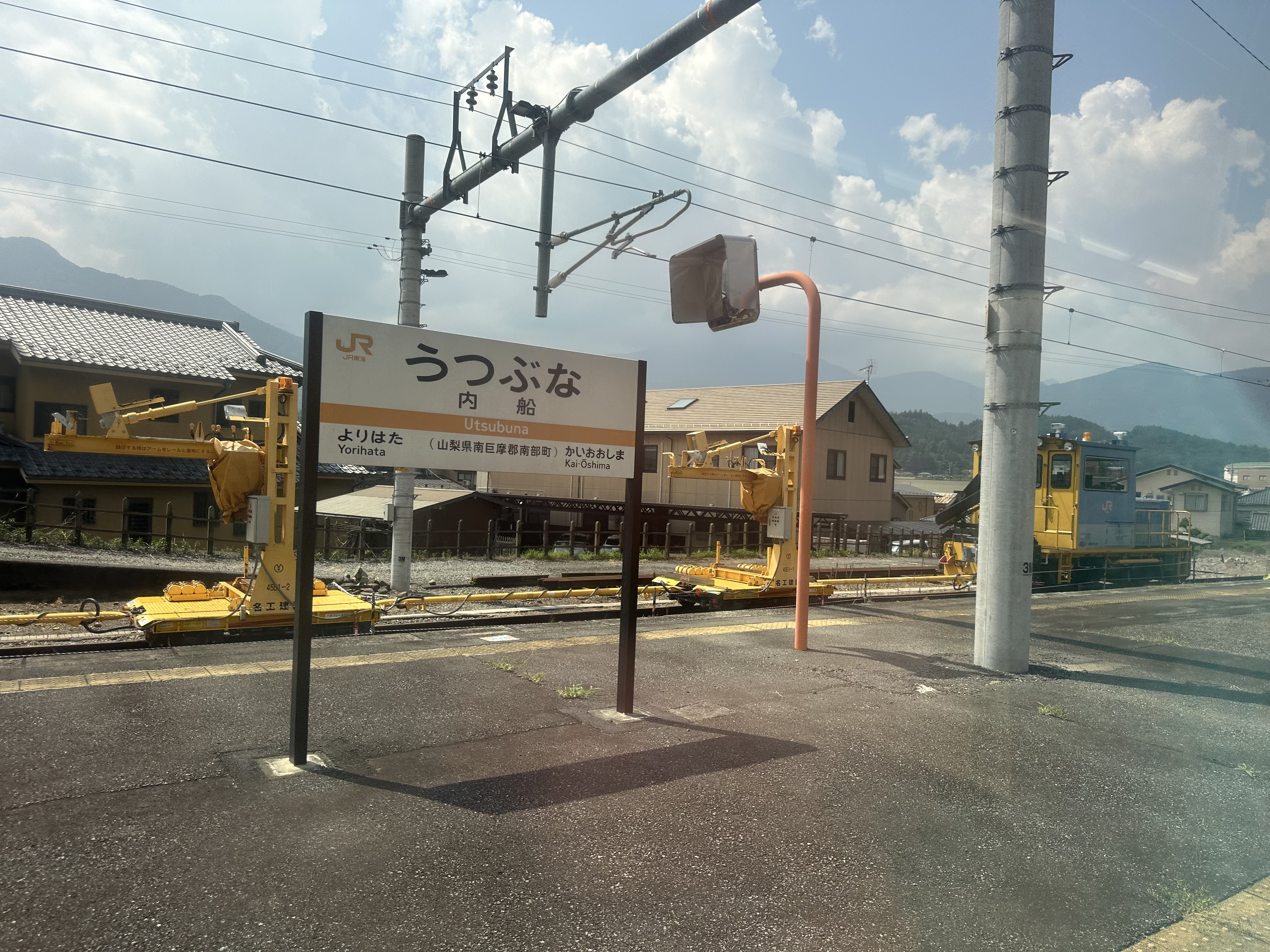

== Adjacent stations ==
«	Service	»
Minobu Line
Fujinomiya	Limited Express Fujikawa	Minobu
Yorihata	Local	Kai-Ōshima

== History ==
Utsubuna Station was opened on October 8, 1918 as a Utsubuna-Nanbu Station (内船南部駅, UtsubunaNanbu-eki) on the original Fuji-Minobu Line. The station was renamed to its present name on October 1, 1938. The line came under control of the Japanese Government Railways on May 1, 1941. The JGR became the JNR (Japan National Railway) after World War II. The current station building was completed in March 1967. Along with the division and privatization of JNR on April 1, 1987, the station came under the control and operation of the Central Japan Railway Company.

== Surrounding area ==
- Fuji River
- Nanbu Junior High School

== See also ==
- List of railway stations in Japan
