= Kai-Ōshima Station =

Railway station in Minobu, Yamanashi Prefecture, Japan

Kai-Ōshima Station 甲斐大島駅
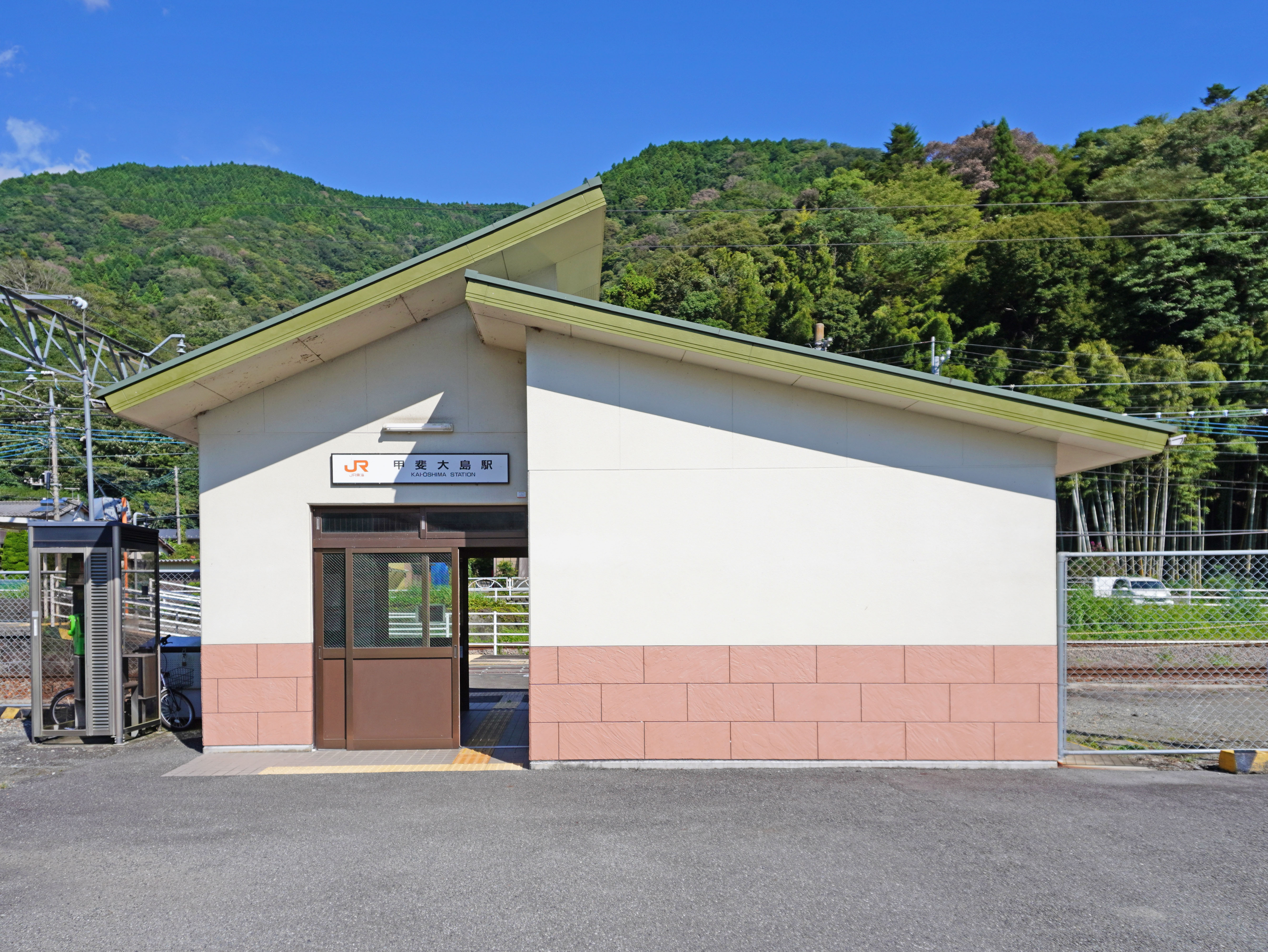
- Kai-Ōshima Station, September 2022

General information
- Location: Ōshima, Minobu, Minamikoma, Yamanashi （山梨県南巨摩郡身延町大島） Japan
- Coordinates: 35.3281°N 138.4523°E
- Operator: JR Central
- Line: Minobu Line
- Distance: 39.8 kilometers from Fuji
- Platforms: 1 island platform

Other information
- Status: Unstaffed

History
- Opened: April 8, 1919

Passengers
- FY2016: 4 daily
Location
- Location within Yamanashi Prefecture Location within Japan

Kai-Ōshima Station (甲斐大島駅, Kai-Ōshima-eki) is a railway station on the Minobu Line of Central Japan Railway Company (JR Central) located in the town of Minobu, Minamikoma District, Yamanashi Prefecture, Japan.

== Lines ==
Kai-Ōshima Station is served by the Minobu Line and is located 39.8 kilometers from the southern terminus of the line at Fuji Station.

== Layout ==
Kai-Ōshima Station has a single island platform connected to a small station building containing a waiting room by a level crossing. The station is unattended.

=== Platform ===
1	■ Minobu Line	For Fujinomiya, Fuji
2	■ Minobu Line	For Minobu, Kōfu

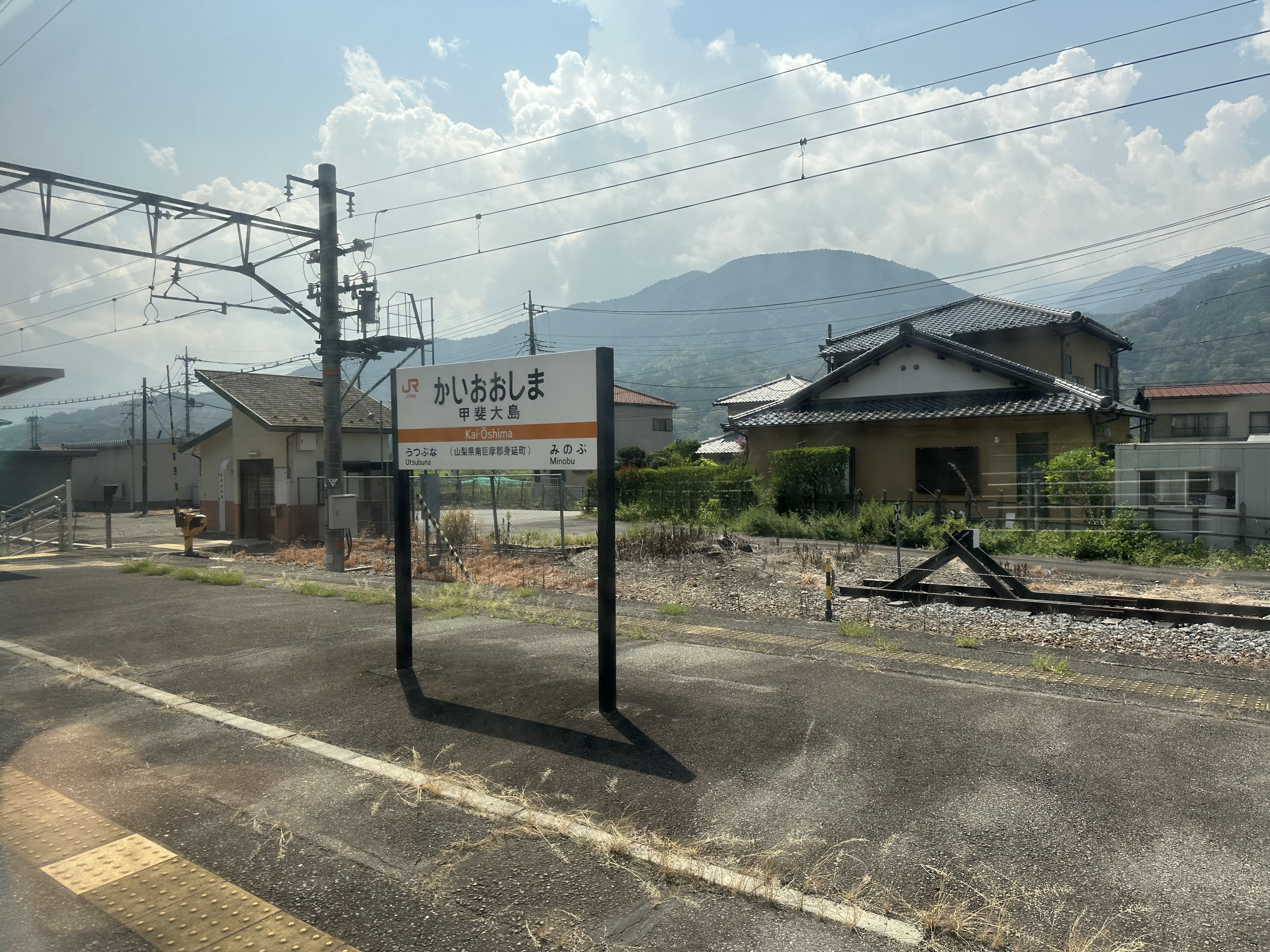

== Adjacent stations ==
«	Service	»
Minobu Line
Limited Express Fujikawa: Does not stop at this station
Utsubuna	Local	Minobu

== History ==
Kai-Ōshima Station was opened on April 8, 1919 as a station on the original Fuji-Minobu Line. The line came under control of the Japanese Government Railways on May 1, 1941. The JGR became the JNR (Japan National Railway) after World War II. Along with the division and privatization of JNR on April 1, 1987, the station came under the control and operation of the Central Japan Railway Company. The current station building was completed in February 2000.

== Surrounding area ==
- Fuji River

== See also ==
- List of railway stations in Japan
