= Shimobe-onsen Station =

Railway station in Minobu, Yamanashi Prefecture, Japan

Shimobe-onsen Station 下部温泉駅
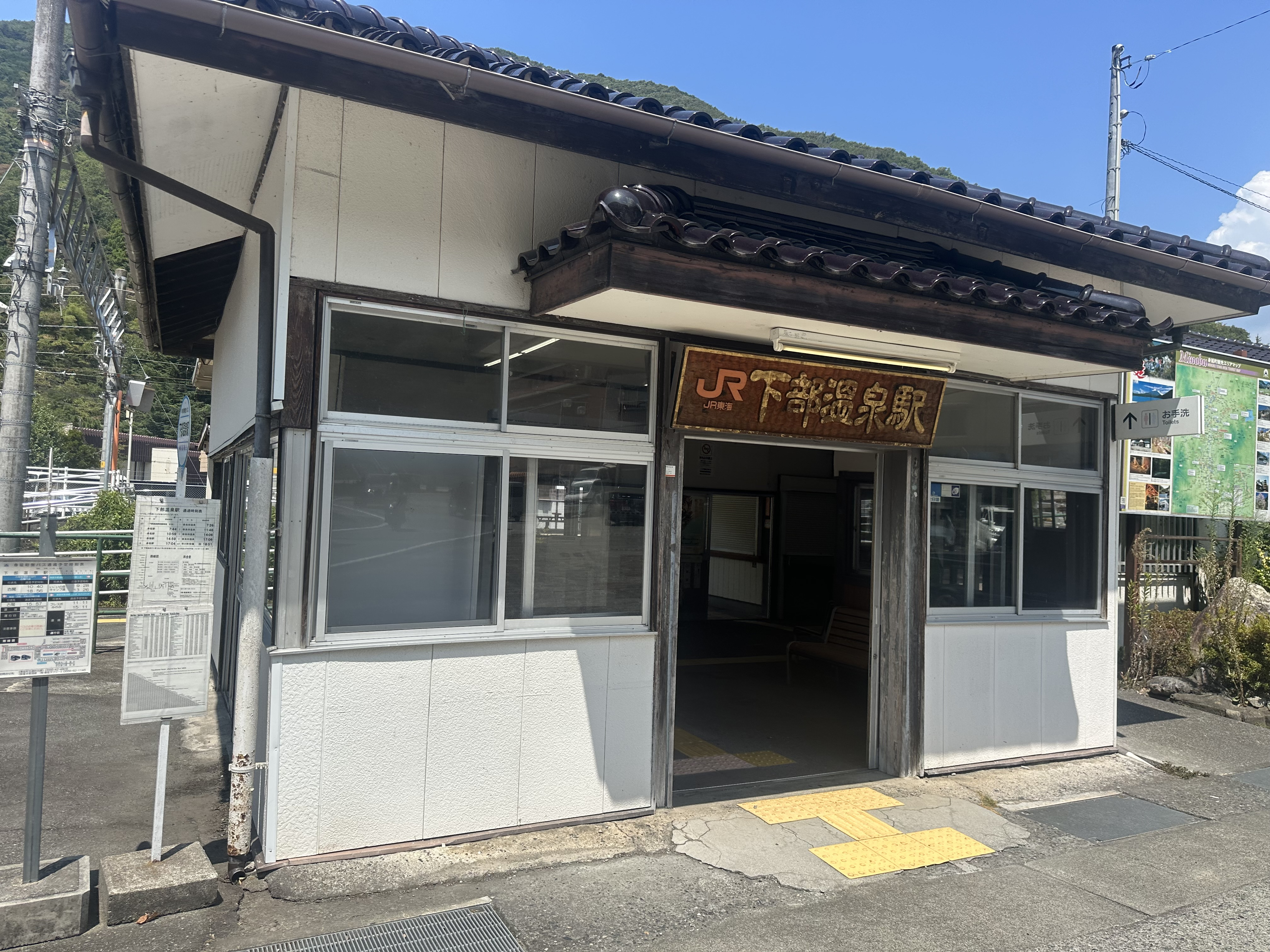
- JR Shimobe-onsen Station, August 2025

General information
- Location: 608 Hadakajima, Minobu-cho, Minamikoma-gun, Yamanashi-ken; Japan
- Coordinates: 35.4260°N 138.4722°E
- Operator: JR Central
- Line: Minobu Line
- Distance: 51.7 kilometers from Fuji
- Platforms: 1 island platform

Other information
- Status: Unstaffed

History
- Opened: December 17, 1927
- Former names: Shimobe (to1991)

Passengers
- FY2016: 99 daily
Location
- Location within Yamanashi Prefecture Location within Japan

Shimobe-onsen Station (下部温泉駅, Shimobe-onsen-eki) is a railway station on the Minobu Line of Central Japan Railway Company (JR Central) located in the town of Minobu, Minamikoma District, Yamanashi Prefecture, Japan.

== Lines ==
Shimobe-onsen Station is served by the Minobu Line and is located 51.7 kilometers from the southern terminus of the line at Fuji Station.

== Layout ==
Shimobe-onsen Station has one island platform connected by a level crossing. The station is unattended.

=== Platform ===
1	■ Minobu Line	For Fuji, Minobu
2	■ Minobu Line	For Kōfu

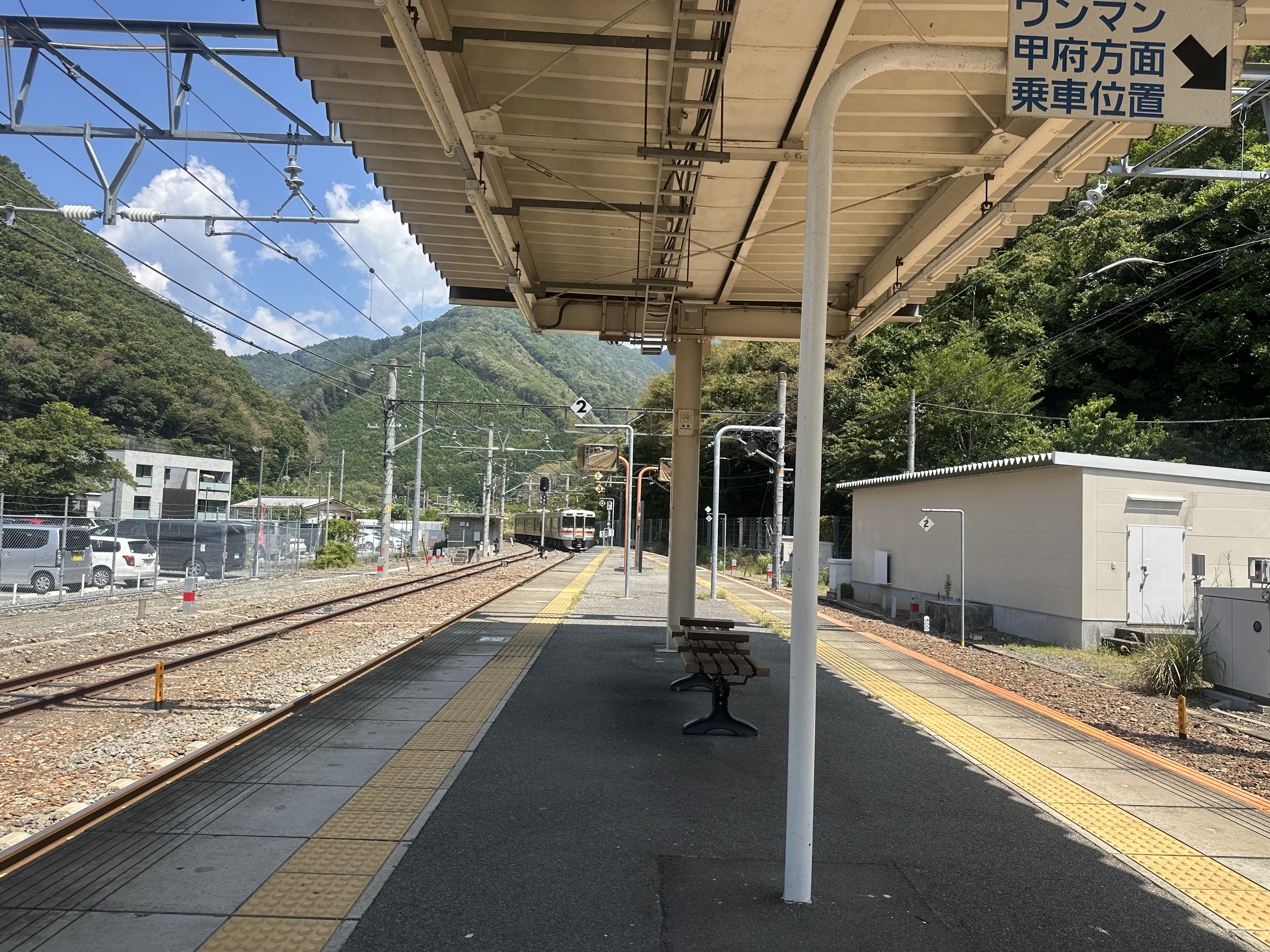

== Adjacent stations ==
«	Service	»
Minobu Line
Minobu	Limited Express Fujikawa	Kai-Iwama
Hadakajima	Local	Kai-Tokiwa

== History ==
Shimobe-onsen Station was opened on December 17, 1927, as a Shimobe Station (下部駅, Shimobe-eki) on the original Fuji-Minobu Line. The line came under control of the Japanese Government Railways on May 1, 1941. The JGR became the JNR (Japan National Railway) after World War II. Along with the division and privatization of JNR on April 1, 1987, the station came under the control and operation of the Central Japan Railway Company. The station was renamed to its present name on December 14, 1991.

== See also ==
- List of railway stations in Japan
