= Shionosawa Station =

Railway station in Minobu, Yamanashi Prefecture, Japan

Shionosawa Station 塩之沢駅
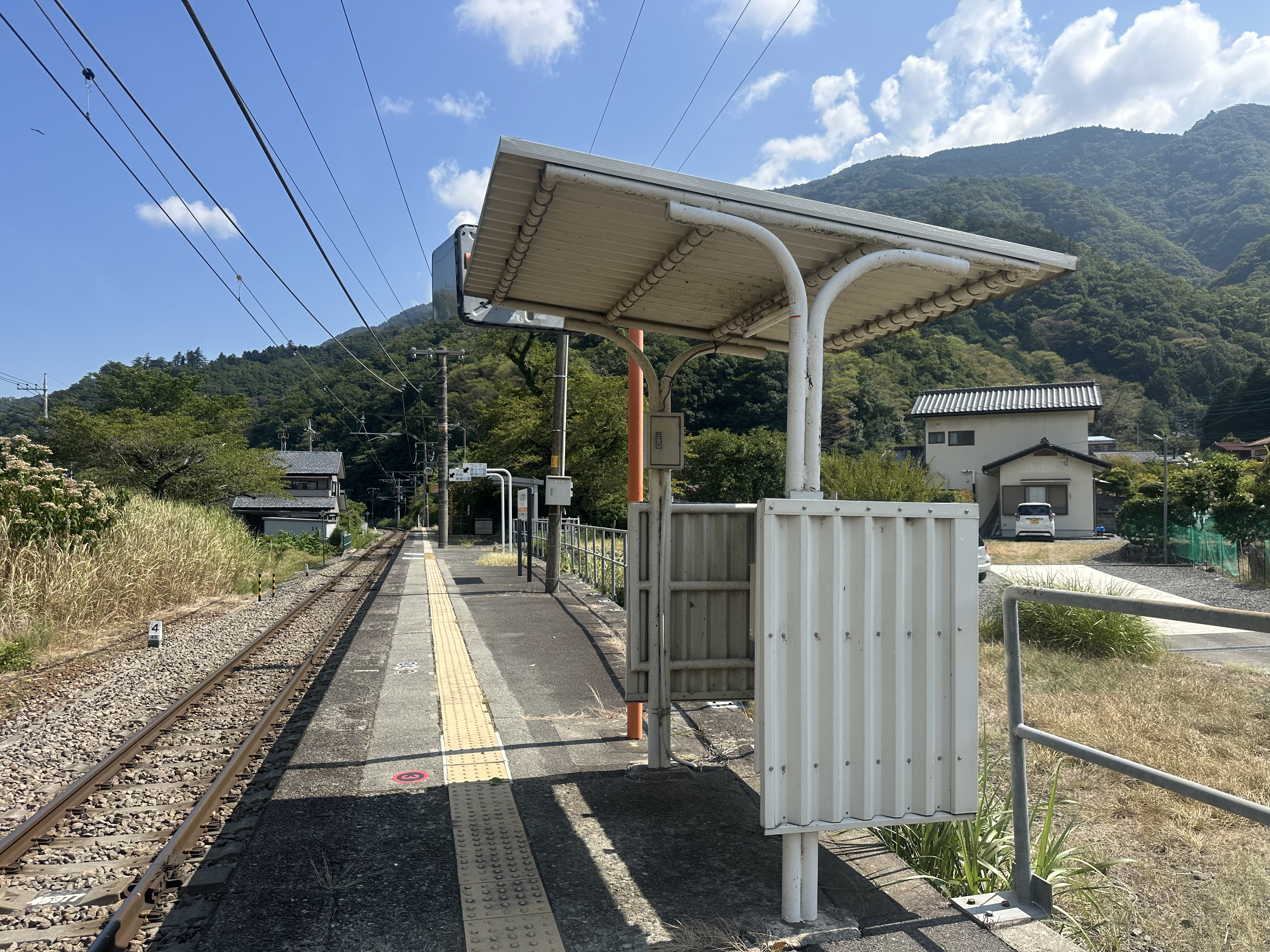
- JR Shionosawa Station, August 2025

General information
- Location: Obigane, Minobu-cho, Minamikoma-gun, Yamanashi^ken; Japan
- Coordinates: 35.3794°N 138.4540°E
- Operator: JR Central
- Line: Minobu Line
- Distance: 45.7 kilometers from Fuji
- Platforms: 1 side platform

Other information
- Status: Unstaffed

History
- Opened: September 1, 1933

Passengers
- FY2016: 14 daily
Location
- Location within Yamanashi Prefecture Location within Japan

Shionosawa Station (塩之沢駅, Shionosawa-eki) is a railway station on the Minobu Line of Central Japan Railway Company (JR Central) located in the town of Minobu, Minamikoma District, Yamanashi Prefecture, Japan.

== Lines ==
Shionosawa Station is served by the Minobu Line and is located 45.7 kilometers from the southern terminus of the line at Fuji Station.

== Layout ==
Shionosawa Station has one side platform serving a single bi-directional track. There is no station building, but only a shelter on the platform. The station is unattended.

== Adjacent stations ==
| « | Service | » |
Minobu Line
Limited Express Fujikawa: Does not stop at this station
| Minobu | Local | Hadakajima |

== History ==
Shionosawa Station was opened on September 1, 1933 as a signal stop on the original Fuji-Minobu Line. It was upgraded to a full station on June 1, 1934. The line came under control of the Japanese Government Railways on May 1, 1941. The JGR became the JNR (Japan National Railway) after World War II. Along with the division and privatization of JNR on April 1, 1987, the station came under the control and operation of the Central Japan Railway Company.

== Surrounding area ==
- Fuji River

== See also ==
- List of railway stations in Japan
