= Ide Station =

Railway station in Nanbu, Yamanashi Prefecture, Japan

Ide Station 井出駅
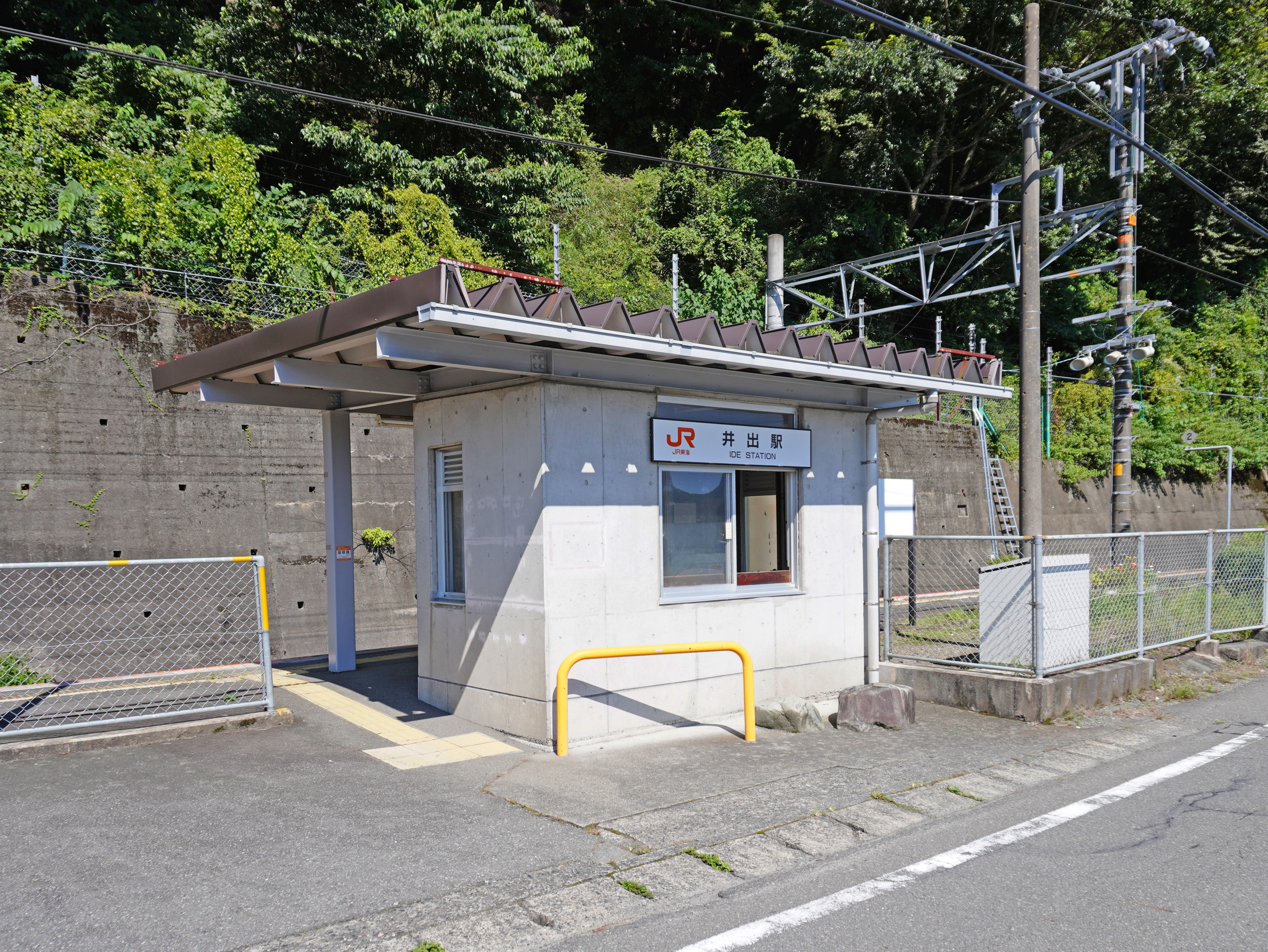
- Ide Station, September 2022

General information
- Location: Ide 1621, Nanbu-cho, Minamikoma-gun, Yamanashi-ken; Japan
- Coordinates: 35.2475°N 138.4909°E
- Operator: JR Central
- Line: Minobu Line
- Distance: 29.4 kilometers from Fuji
- Platforms: 1 side platform

Other information
- Status: Unstaffed

History
- Opened: March 26, 1929
- Former names: Idefukushi (until 1938)

Passengers
- FY2016: 45 daily
Location
- Location within Yamanashi Prefecture Location within Japan

Ide Station (井出駅, Ide-eki) is a railway station on the Minobu Line of Central Japan Railway Company (JR Central) located in the town of Nanbu, Minamikoma District, Yamanashi Prefecture, Japan.

== Lines ==
Ide Station is served by the Minobu Line and is located 29.4 kilometers from the southern terminus of the line at Fuji Station.

== Layout ==
Ide Station has one side platform serving a single bidirectional track. The station building is unattended and does not have automated ticket machines or automated turnstiles.

== Adjacent stations ==
«	Service	»
Minobu Line
Limited Express Fujikawa: Does not stop at this station
Tōshima	Local	Yorihata

== History ==
Ide Station was opened on March 26, 1929 as Idefukushi Signal Stop (井出福士停留場, Idefukushi Teiryojo), on the original Fuji-Minobu Line. It was elevated to the status of a full station on June 22, and was renamed to its present name on October 1, 1938. The line came under control of the Japanese Government Railways on May 1, 1941. The JGR became the JNR (Japan National Railway) after World War II. The station has been unattended since June 1, 1983. Along with the division and privatization of JNR on April 1, 1987, the station came under the control and operation of the Central Japan Railway Company. The station building was rebuilt in March 1994.

== Surrounding area ==
- Fuji River

== See also ==
- List of railway stations in Japan
