= Jian Xin =

Singaporean Buddhist nun

Jian Xin 見心
- Education: BA Sociology; MA Buddhist Studies; Postgraduate Diploma in Satir Systemic Brief Therapy; Certified Hypnotherapist
- Occupation: Bhikkhuni

Jian Xin (simplified Chinese: 见心; traditional Chinese: 見心; pinyin: Jiànxīn) is a Singaporean Buddhist nun and founder of Miao Xin Vihara. It was founded as a coaching and counselling service offering group facilitation and transformation workshops, before a series of basic dharma courses began conducted in Singapore till today

== Biography ==
Jian Xin became involved with Buddhism at the age of 15, when she made the resolve to follow the bodhisattva path.

She graduated from the National University of Singapore and pursued further studies at Yuan Kuang Buddhist Institute in Taiwan. She obtained a master's degree in Buddhist Studies from the SOAS University of London.
