= Yorihata Station =

Railway station in Nanbu, Yamanashi Prefecture, Japan

Yorihata Station 寄畑駅
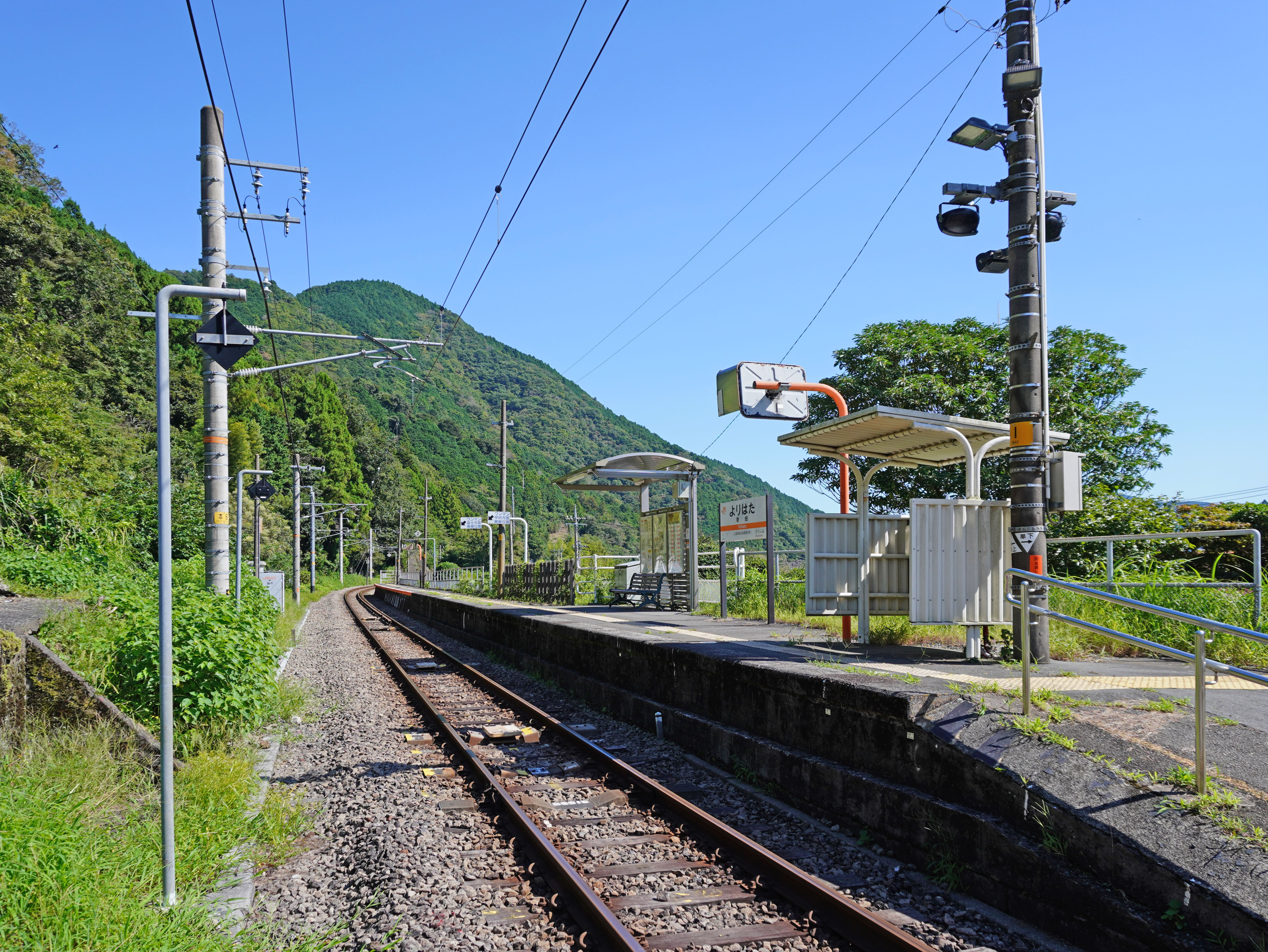
- Yorihata Station, September 2022

General information
- Location: 21034 Utsubuna, Nanbu-cho, Minamikoma-gun, Yamanashi-ken; Japan
- Coordinates: 35.2649°N 138.4751°E
- Operator: JR Central
- Line: Minobu Line
- Distance: 31.9 kilometers from Fuji
- Platforms: 1 side platform

Other information
- Status: Unstaffed

History
- Opened: November 1, 1931

Passengers
- FY2016: 15 daily
Location
- Location within Yamanashi Prefecture Location within Japan

Yorihata Station (寄畑駅, Yorihata-eki) is a railway station on the Minobu Line of Central Japan Railway Company (JR Central) located in the town of Nanbu, Minamikoma District, Yamanashi Prefecture, Japan.

== Lines ==
Yorihata Station is served by the Minobu Line and is located 31.9 kilometers from the southern terminus of the line at Fuji Station.

== Layout ==
Yorihata Station has one side platform serving a single bidirectional track. The station building is unattended and has neither automated ticket machines nor automated turnstiles.

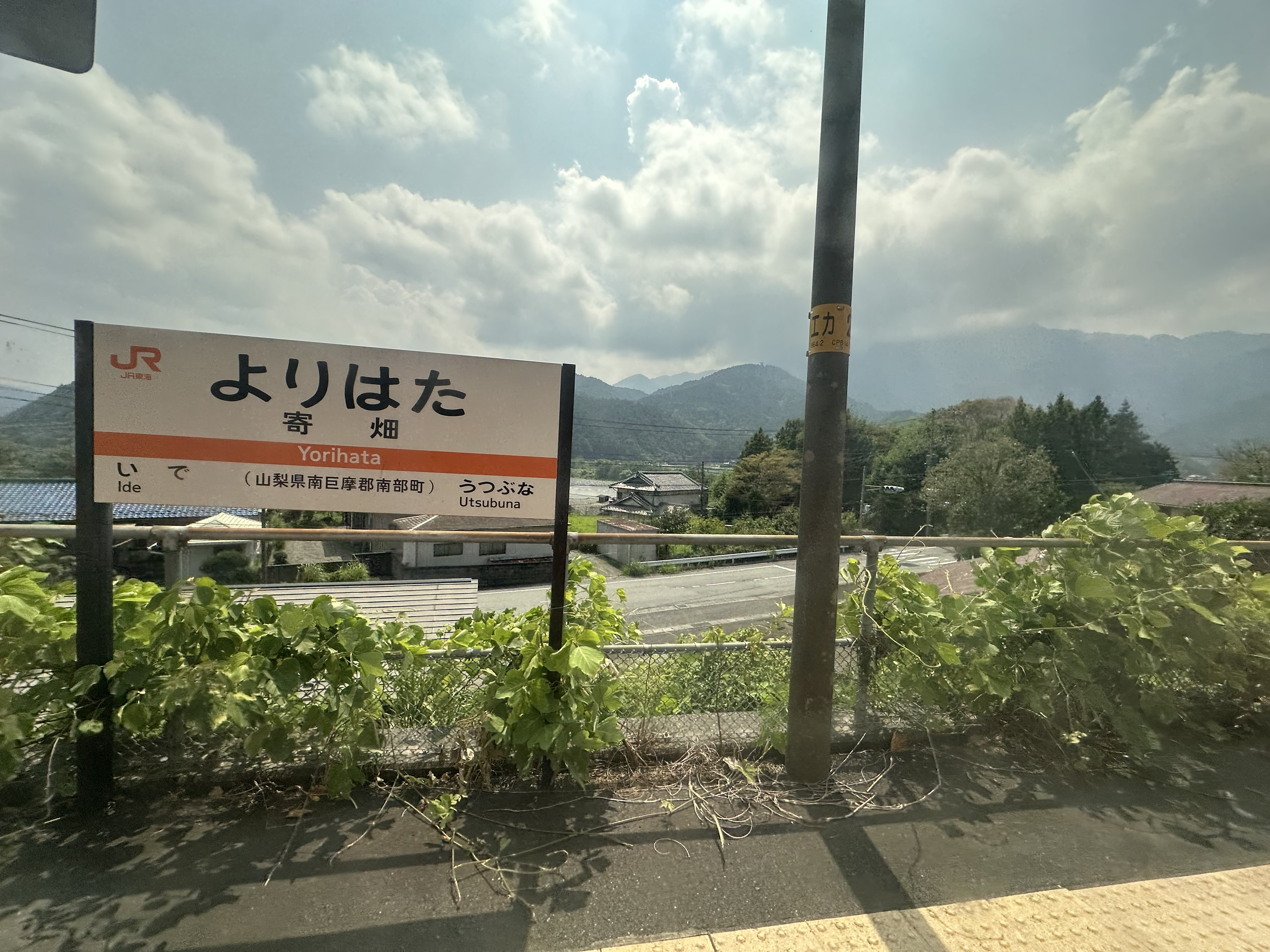

== Adjacent stations ==
| « | Service | » |
Minobu Line
Limited Express Fujikawa: Does not stop at this station
| Ide | Local | Utsubuna |

== History ==
Yorihata Station was opened on November 1, 1931 as a station on the original Fuji-Minobu Line. The line came under control of the Japanese Government Railways on May 1, 1941. The JGR became the JNR (Japan National Railway) after World War II. Along with the division and privatization of JNR on April 1, 1987, the station came under the control and operation of the Central Japan Railway Company.

== Surrounding area ==
- Fuji River

== See also ==
- List of railway stations in Japan
