= Kunado Station =

Railway station in Minobu, Yamanashi Prefecture, Japan

Kunado Station 久那土駅
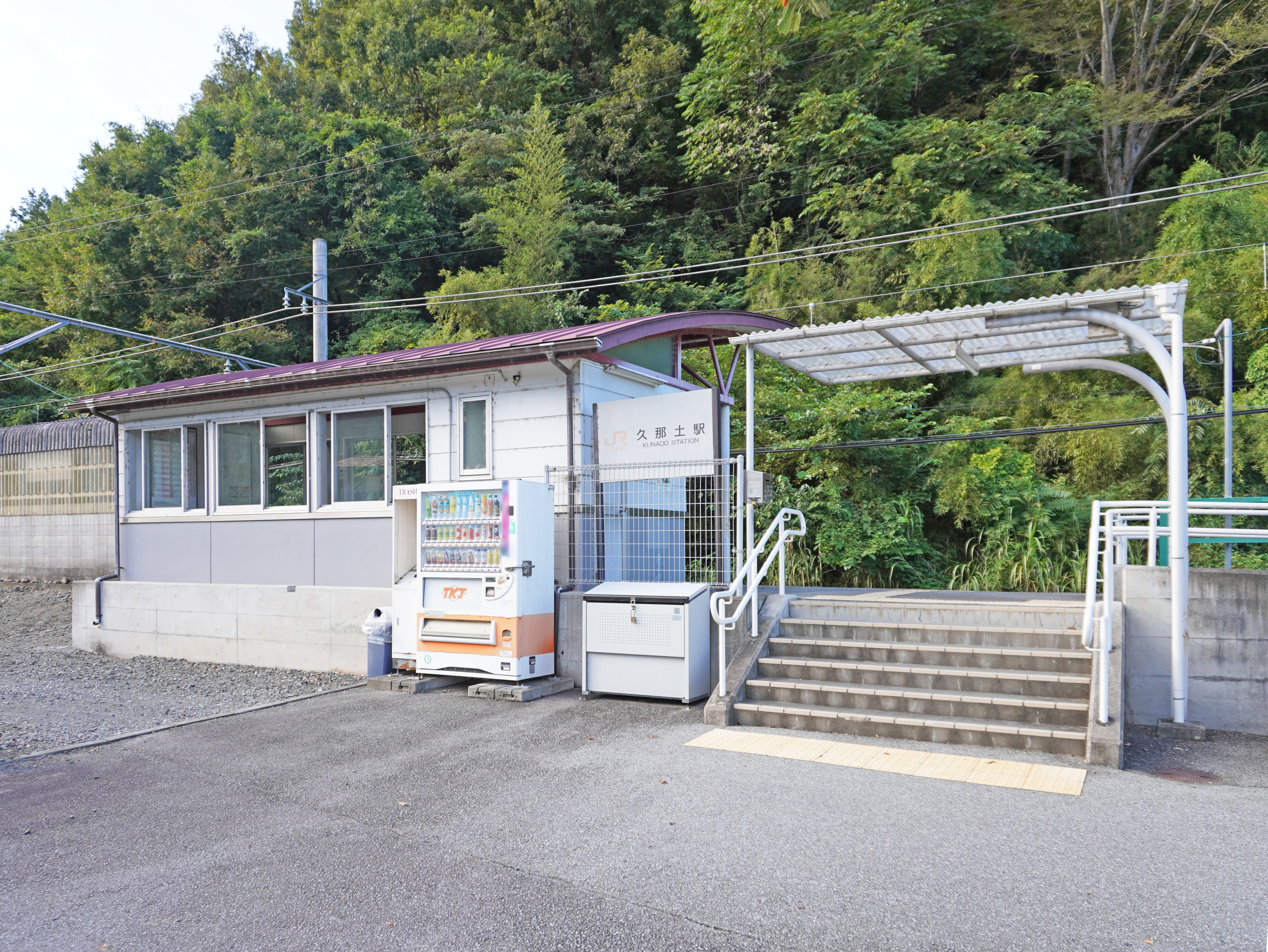
- Kunado Station, September 2022

General information
- Location: 1150 Misawa, Minobu-cho, Minamikoma-gun, Yamanashi-ken; Japan
- Coordinates: 35.4813°N 138.4671°E
- Operator: JR Central
- Line: Minobu Line
- Distance: 58.8 kilometers from Fuji
- Platforms: 1 side platform

Other information
- Status: Unstaffed

History
- Opened: December 17, 1927

Passengers
- FY2016: 186 daily
Location
- Location within Yamanashi Prefecture Location within Japan

Kunado Station (久那土駅, Kunado-eki) is a railway station on the Minobu Line of Central Japan Railway Company (JR Central) located in the town of Minobu, Minamikoma District, Yamanashi Prefecture, Japan.

== Lines ==
Kunado Station is served by the Minobu Line and is located 58.8 kilometers from the southern terminus of the line at Fuji Station.

== Layout ==
Kunado Station has one side platform serving a single bi-directional track. The station is unattended.

== Adjacent stations ==
«	Service	»
Minobu Line
Limited Express Fujikawa: Does not stop at this station
Ichinose	Local	Kai-Iwama

== History ==
Kunado Station was opened on December 17, 1927 as a station on the original Fuji-Minobu Line. It has been unattended since the day of its opening. The line came under control of the Japanese Government Railways on May 1, 1941. The JGR became the JNR (Japan National Railway) after World War II. Along with the division and privatization of JNR on April 1, 1987, the station came under the control and operation of the Central Japan Railway Company. The station building was rebuilt in 1999.

== Surrounding area ==
- The station is located in a rural area in what was formerly Kunado Village.

== See also ==
- List of railway stations in Japan
