= Buddhist studies =

Academic study of Buddhism

Buddhist studies, also known as Buddhology, is the academic study of Buddhism. The term Buddhology was coined in the early 20th century by the Unitarian minister Joseph Estlin Carpenter to mean the "study of Buddhahood, the nature of the Buddha, and the doctrines of a Buddha", but the terms Buddhology and Buddhist studies are generally synonymous in the contemporary context. According to William M. Johnston, in some specific contexts, Buddhology may be viewed as a subset of Buddhist studies, with a focus on Buddhist hermeneutics, exegesis, ontology and Buddha's attributes. Scholars of Buddhist studies focus on the history, culture, archaeology, arts, philology, anthropology, sociology, theology, philosophy, practices, interreligious comparative studies and other subjects related to Buddhism.

In contrast to the study of Judaism or Christianity, the field of Buddhist studies has been dominated by "outsiders" to Buddhist cultures and traditions, hence it is not a direct subfield of Indology or Asian studies. However, Chinese, Japanese and Korean universities have also made major contributions, as have Asian immigrants to Western countries, and Western converts to Buddhism.

== University programs and institutes ==
=== Asia ===
In Asia, University of Tokyo and Rissho University have long been major centers for Buddhist research, and Nalanda University launched a master program at 2016 Delhi university has a Buddhist studies department since 1957 .

==== Japan ====
Most major universities in Japan have departments of Eastern philosophy, including Buddhist studies or Indian philosophy.

University of Tokyo (Dpt. of Indian Philosophy and Buddhist Studies) and Kyoto University (Dpt. of Buddhist Studies) are public universities which have specialized Buddhist studies departments.

Toyo University (non-sect, but associated with the Honganji) a private university founded by Inoue Enryo, is also renowned for its Buddhist studies.

Buddhist studies is also studied in universities run by various religious denominations.

- Intersect: Taisho (Tendai, Singon-Chizan, Jōdo, Shingon-Buzan, Jishū)
- Esoteric sects: Koyasan (Shingon), Shuchiin (Singon-Chizan, Shingon-Buzan, Shingi-Shingon)
- Lotus Sutra sects: Rissho (Nichiren), Minobsan (Nichiren)
- Pure Land sects: Bukkyo (Jōdo), Ryukoku (Honganji), Musashino (Honganji), Otani (Ōtani), Doho (Ōtani)
- Zen sects: Komazawa (Sōtō), Hanazono (Rinzai)

=== America ===
The first graduate program in Buddhist studies in North America started in 1961 at the University of Wisconsin–Madision. According to Prebish, Buddhist studies in the United States prior to 1975 was dominated by the University of Wisconsin, Harvard University and the University of Chicago. Prebish cites two surveys by Hart in which the following university programs were found to have produced the most scholars with U.S. university posts: Chicago, Wisconsin, Harvard, Columbia, Yale, Virginia, Stanford, Berkeley, Princeton, Temple, Northwestern, Michigan, Washington, and Tokyo.

Other regionally-accredited U.S. institutions with programs in Buddhism include the University of the West, Institute of Buddhist Studies, Naropa University, Dharma Realm Buddhist University and the California Institute of Integral Studies.

A number of dharma centers offer semi-academic, unaccredited study, notably the Barre Center for Buddhist Studies and the Sati Center for Buddhist Studies.

=== Europe ===
Prominent European programs include the University of Oxford and the University of Cambridge, School of Oriental and African Studies, Humboldt University of Berlin, University of Hamburg, LMU Munich, Heidelberg University, University of Bonn, University of Vienna, Ghent University, and the Sorbonne.

== Scholars and scholar-practitioners ==
Charles Prebish, a scholar-practitioner and Chair of Religious Studies at Utah State University, states that the Buddhist studies and academics in North American universities include those who are practicing Buddhists, the latter he terms as “scholar-practitioners.”.

== Professional associations ==
- International Association of Buddhist Studies

== Publications ==
Journals specializing in Buddhist Studies (in alphabetical order):

- Buddhist Studies Review
- Canadian Journal of Buddhist Studies
- Contemporary Buddhism
- Dhammadhara Journal of Buddhist Studies
- The Eastern Buddhist
- The Indian International Journal of Buddhist Studies
- International Journal for the Study of Humanistic Buddhism
- Journal of Buddhist Ethics
- Journal of Buddhist Philosophy
- Journal of Chinese Buddhist Studies
- Journal of Global Buddhism
- Journal of Indian and Buddhist Studies / Indogaku Bunkkyogaku Kenkyu
- Journal of the International Association of Buddhist Studies
- Journal of the International College for Postgraduate Buddhist Studies
- Journal of the Oxford Centre for Buddhist Studies
- Pacific World: Journal of the Institute of Buddhist Studies
- The Pure Land: Journal of the International Association of Shin Buddhist Studies
- Sengokuyama Journal of Buddhist Studies
- Thai International Journal of Buddhist Studies
- Universal Gate Buddhist Journal / 普門學報

In addition, many scholars publish in journals devoted to area studies (such as Japan, China, etc.), general Religious Studies, or disciplines such as history, anthropology, or language studies. Some examples would be:

- Indo-Iranian Journal
- Japanese Journal of Religious Studies
- Journal of Chinese Religions
- Journal of Indian Philosophy
- Journal of the Pali Text Society
- Philosophy East and West
- Buddhist-Christian Studies

Major university presses that have published in the field include those of Oxford, Columbia, Cambridge, Indiana, Princeton, SUNY, and the Universities of California, Chicago, Hawaii, and Virginia. Non-university presses include E.J. Brill, Equinox, Palgrave, Routledge, Silkworm Books, and Motilal Banarsidass. A number of scholars have published through "dharma presses" such as BPS Pariyatti, Parallax Press, Shambhala, Snow Lion, and Wisdom Publications.

== See also ==
- Pali Text Society
- Buddhist Publication Society
- List of modern scholars in Buddhist studies
- Oxford Centre for Buddhist Studies

== Sources ==
- Lopez, Donald S. Jr., ed. (1995). Curators of the Buddha. University of Chicago Press.
- Prebish, Charles (1999). "The Academic Study of Buddhism in America: A Silent Sangha". In Duncan Ryuken Williams; Christopher S. Queen (eds.). American Buddhism: Methods and Findings in Recent Scholarship. Surrey, UK: Curzon Press. pp. 183–214.
