= Nanbu, Yamanashi =

Nanbu 南部町
- Town
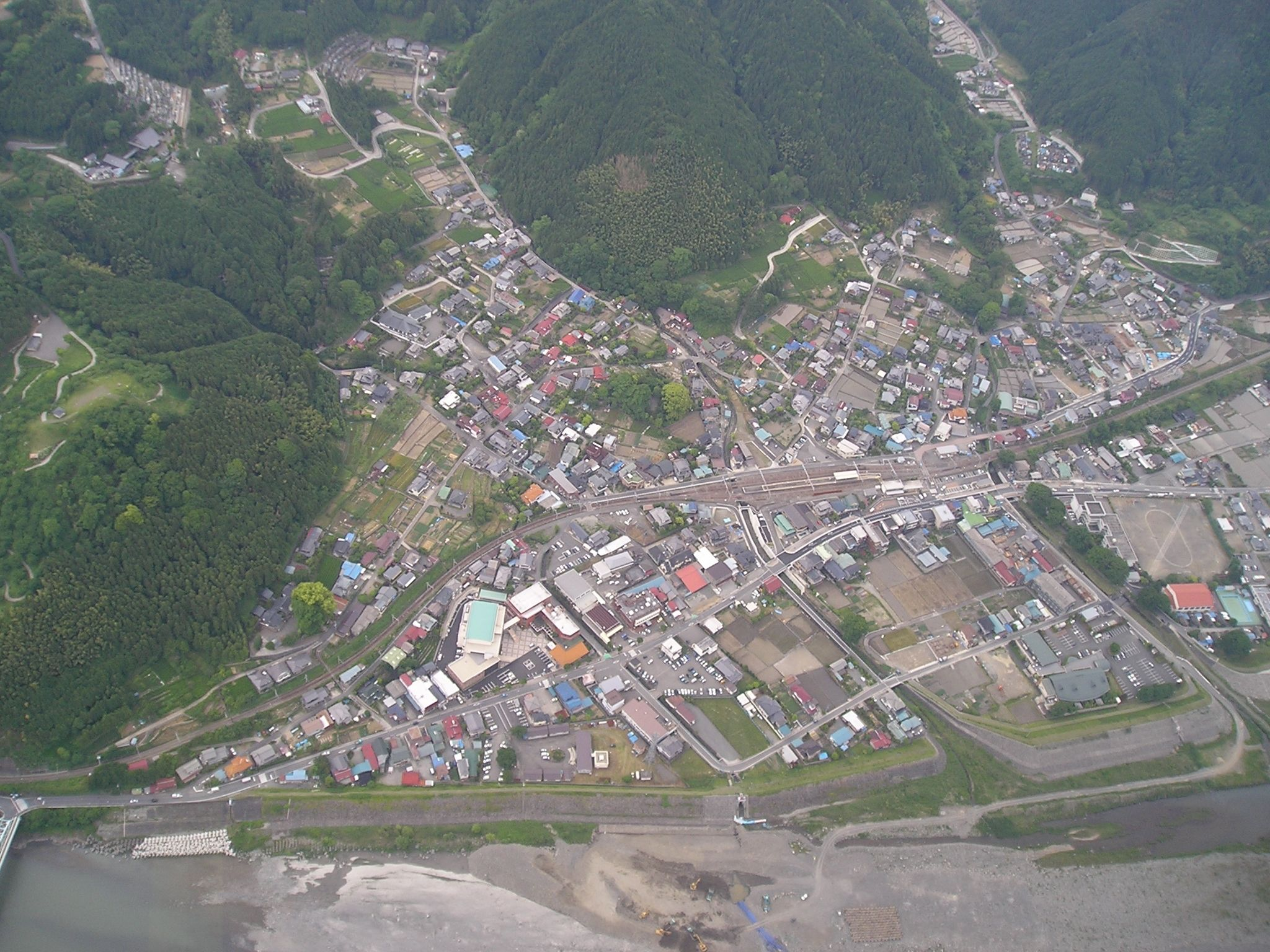
- Aerial view of the area around Utsubuna Station, Nanbu.

- Flag Seal

- Location of Nanbu in Yamanashi Prefecture

- Coordinates: 35°15′N 138°29′E
- Country: Japan
- Region: Chūbu; Tōkai
- Prefecture: Yamanashi Prefecture
- District: Minamikoma

Area
  - Total: 200.63 km^{2} (77.46 sq mi)

Population (May 1, 2019)
  - Total: 7,222
  - Density: 36.00/km^{2} (93.23/sq mi)
- Time zone: UTC+9 (Japan Standard Time)
- Phone number: 0556-66-2111
- Address: 28505-2 Fukushi Nambu-cho Minimikoma-gun, Yamanashi-ken 409-2102
- Climate: Cfa
- Website: Official website
- Symbols
- Bird: Japanese white-eye
- Flower: Hydrangea
- Tree: Chamaecyparis obtusa

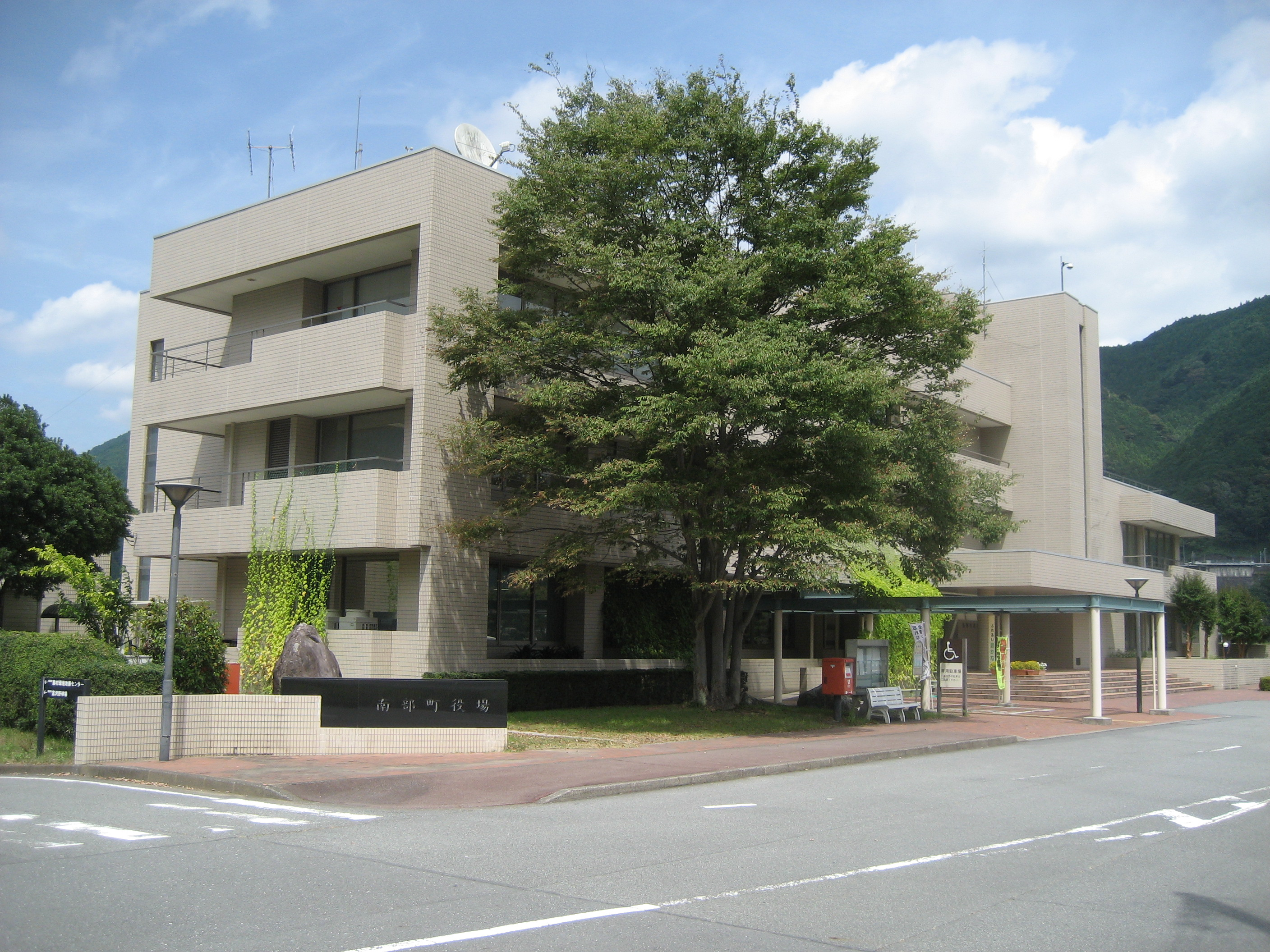
Nanbu town hall

Nanbu (南部町, Nanbu-chō) is a town located in Yamanashi Prefecture, Japan. As of 1 June 2019, the town had an estimated population of 7222 in 3149 households, and a population density of 36 persons per km^{2}. The total area of the town is 200.63 square kilometres (77.46 sq mi).

== Geography ==
Nanbu is the southernmost municipality in Yamanashi Prefecture. The Fuji River runs through the town. Some 90% of the town's area is covered with forest, and less than 4% is used for agriculture. At an average elevation of 150 meters, Nanbu has the lowest elevation of any municipality in Yamanashi.

=== Neighboring municipalities ===
Shizuoka Prefecture

- Aoi-ku, Shizuoka
- Fujinomiya

Yamanashi Prefecture

- Minobu

=== Climate ===
The town has a climate characterized by characterized by hot and humid summers, and relatively mild winters (Köppen climate classification Cfa). The average annual temperature in Nanbu is 15.1 °C. The average annual rainfall is 1858 mm with September as the wettest month. The temperatures are highest on average in August, at around 26.5 °C, and lowest in January, at around 4.5 °C.

Climate data for Nanbu (1991−2020 normals, extremes 1977−present)
| Month | Jan | Feb | Mar | Apr | May | Jun | Jul | Aug | Sep | Oct | Nov | Dec | Year |
|---|---|---|---|---|---|---|---|---|---|---|---|---|---|
| Record high °C (°F) | 18.1 (64.6) | 25.1 (77.2) | 25.7 (78.3) | 29.9 (85.8) | 33.5 (92.3) | 38.1 (100.6) | 37.9 (100.2) | 38.9 (102.0) | 38.1 (100.6) | 32.5 (90.5) | 26.5 (79.7) | 25.3 (77.5) | 38.9 (102.0) |
| Mean daily maximum °C (°F) | 10.3 (50.5) | 11.5 (52.7) | 14.6 (58.3) | 19.9 (67.8) | 24.1 (75.4) | 26.5 (79.7) | 30.1 (86.2) | 31.8 (89.2) | 28.3 (82.9) | 22.8 (73.0) | 17.5 (63.5) | 12.5 (54.5) | 20.8 (69.5) |
| Daily mean °C (°F) | 3.6 (38.5) | 5.0 (41.0) | 8.5 (47.3) | 13.6 (56.5) | 18.2 (64.8) | 21.6 (70.9) | 25.3 (77.5) | 26.4 (79.5) | 23.0 (73.4) | 17.4 (63.3) | 11.3 (52.3) | 5.9 (42.6) | 15.0 (59.0) |
| Mean daily minimum °C (°F) | −1.1 (30.0) | −0.1 (31.8) | 3.3 (37.9) | 8.2 (46.8) | 13.4 (56.1) | 17.9 (64.2) | 21.8 (71.2) | 22.7 (72.9) | 19.4 (66.9) | 13.6 (56.5) | 7.1 (44.8) | 1.3 (34.3) | 10.6 (51.1) |
| Record low °C (°F) | −7.1 (19.2) | −8.5 (16.7) | −4.9 (23.2) | −1.2 (29.8) | 3.6 (38.5) | 11.1 (52.0) | 14.5 (58.1) | 16.4 (61.5) | 10.8 (51.4) | 3.8 (38.8) | −2.1 (28.2) | −5.9 (21.4) | −8.5 (16.7) |
| Average precipitation mm (inches) | 92.6 (3.65) | 106.5 (4.19) | 204.3 (8.04) | 204.1 (8.04) | 214.2 (8.43) | 251.1 (9.89) | 294.6 (11.60) | 248.0 (9.76) | 403.5 (15.89) | 299.4 (11.79) | 148.0 (5.83) | 92.1 (3.63) | 2,558.2 (100.72) |
| Average precipitation days (≥ 1.0 mm) | 5.4 | 6.2 | 10.5 | 9.8 | 10.4 | 12.5 | 12.3 | 10.7 | 11.6 | 10.7 | 7.7 | 5.6 | 113.4 |
| Mean monthly sunshine hours | 178.6 | 163.3 | 159.4 | 173.0 | 170.6 | 117.1 | 128.0 | 165.3 | 125.1 | 131.6 | 150.5 | 171.5 | 1,833.9 |
Source: Japan Meteorological Agency

== Demographics ==
Per Japanese census data, the population of Nanbu has declined steadily over the past 80 years.

Historical population
| Year | Pop. | ±% |
|---|---|---|
| 1940 | 19,293 | — |
| 1950 | 17,911 | −7.2% |
| 1960 | 16,124 | −10.0% |
| 1970 | 13,576 | −15.8% |
| 1980 | 12,465 | −8.2% |
| 1990 | 11,826 | −5.1% |
| 2000 | 10,863 | −8.1% |
| 2010 | 9,011 | −17.0% |
| 2020 | 7,156 | −20.6% |

== History ==
The area around present-day Nanbu is the ancestral home of the Nanbu clan, a prominent daimyō clan in northern Japan during the Edo period. During the Edo period, all of Kai Province was tenryō territory under direct control of the Tokugawa shogunate. During the cadastral reform of the early Meiji period on April 1, 1889, the village of Nanbu was created within Minamikoma District, Yamanashi Prefecture. The village was raised to town status in 1955.

Nanbu merged with the neighboring town of Tomizawa on March 1, 2003, forming the new town of Nanbu.

== Economy ==
Traditionally, forest and the cultivation of green tea were mainstays of the local economy.

== Education ==
Nanbu has four public elementary schools (Mutsuai ES, Sakae ES, Tomikawa ES and Manzawa ES) and one public junior high school (Nanbu JHS) operated by the town government. The town does not have a high school, so students must commute to neighboring town of Minobu or to the city of Fujinomiya in Shizuoka Prefecture.

== Transportation ==
=== Railway ===
- Central Japan Railway Company - Minobu Line
  - Tōshima - Ide - Yorihata - Utsubuna

=== Highway ===
- National Route 52
- National Route 469
