= Minobu, Yamanashi =

Minobu 身延町
- Town
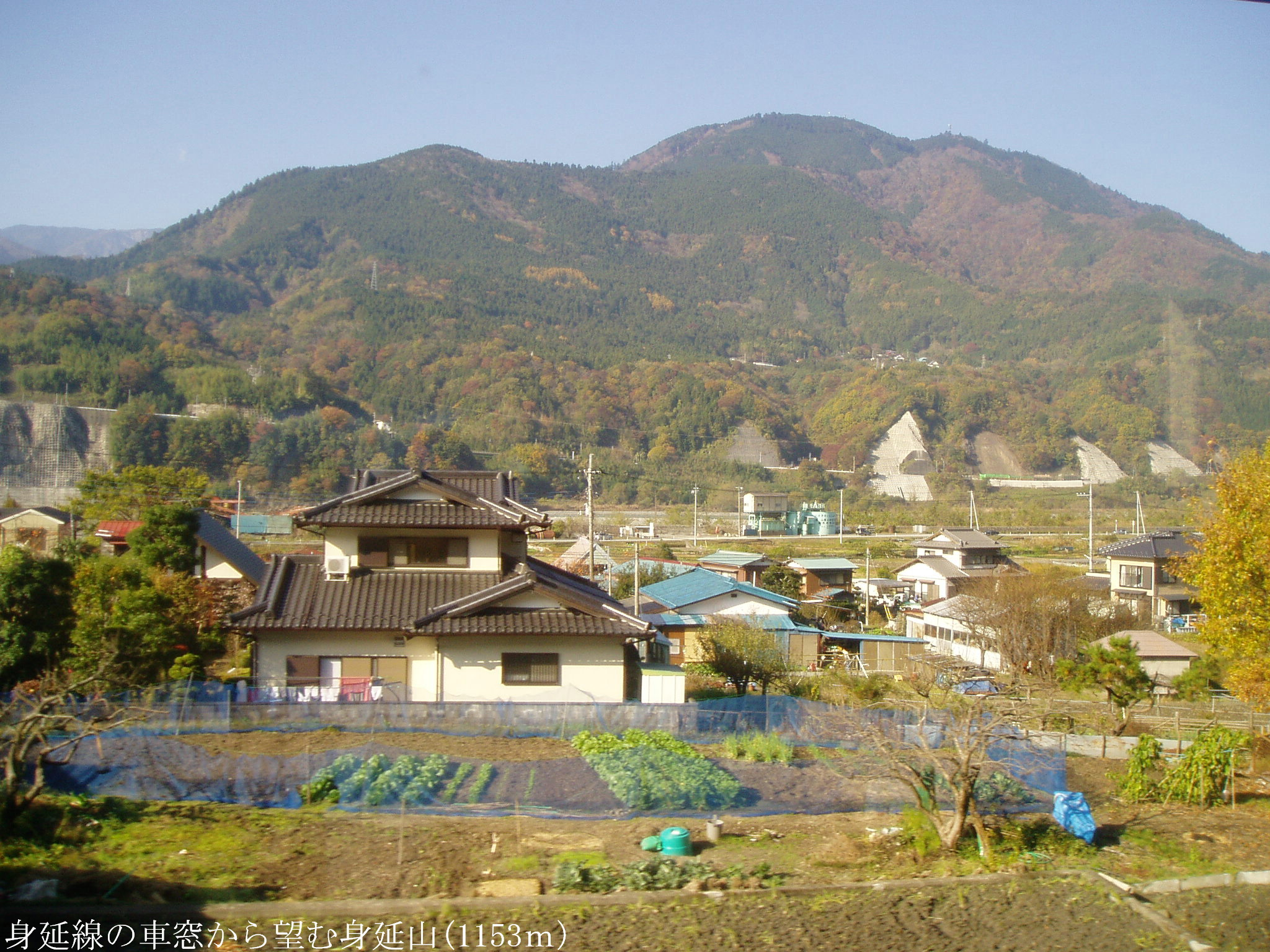
- Mount Minobu (Minobu-san)

- Flag Seal

- Location of Minobu in Yamanashi Prefecture

- Coordinates: 35°28′03″N 138°26′33″E
- Country: Japan
- Region: Chūbu; Tōkai
- Prefecture: Yamanashi Prefecture
- District: Minamikoma

Government
  - Mayor: Hitoshi Mochizuki (since October 2008)

Area
  - Total: 302.00 km^{2} (116.60 sq mi)

Population (June 1, 2019)
  - Total: 11,674
  - Density: 38.656/km^{2} (100.12/sq mi)
- Time zone: UTC+9 (Japan Standard Time)
- Phone number: 0556-42-2111
- Address: 350 Kiriishi, Minobu-chō, Minamikoma-gun, Yamanashi-ken 409-3392
- Climate: Cfa
- Website: Official website
- Symbols
- Bird: Oriental dollarbird Firefly
- Flower: Lilium auratum
- Tree: Prunus pendula

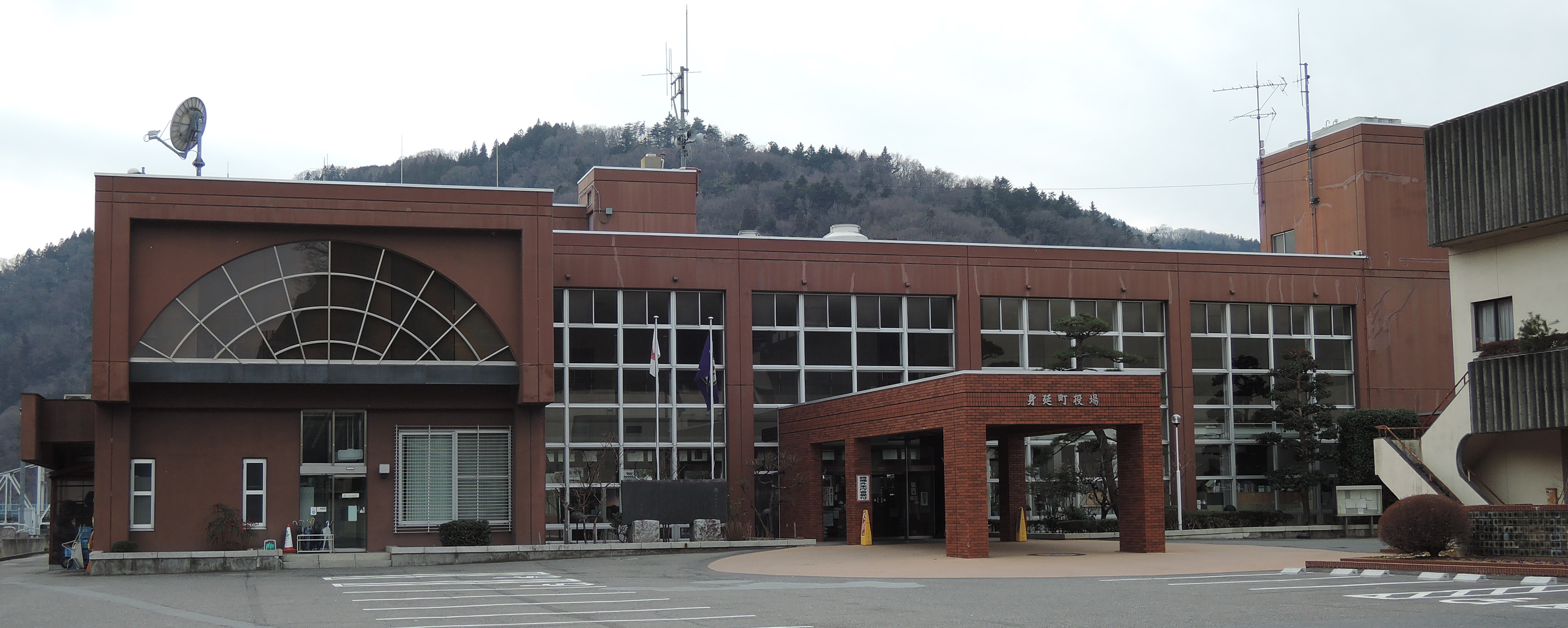
Minobu Town Hall

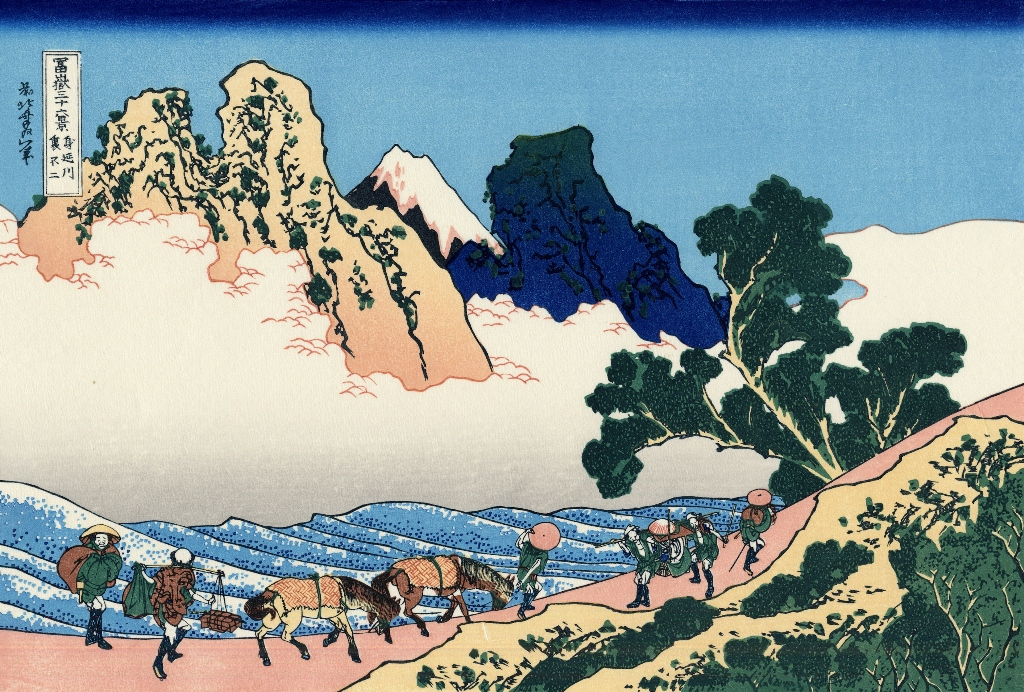
Hokusai -The back of the Fuji from the Minobu river

Minobu (身延町, Minobu-chō) is a town located in Yamanashi Prefecture, Japan. As of 1 June 2019, the town had an estimated population of 11,674 in 5447 households, and a population density of 39 persons per km^{2}. The total area of the town is 302.00 square kilometres (116.60 sq mi).

== Geography ==
Minobu is in south-central Yamanashi Prefecture. The Fuji River passes through the town, which is dominated by the sacred Mount Minobu. It also shares Lake Motosu with neighbouring Fujikawaguchiko.

=== Neighboring municipalities ===
Yamanashi Prefecture

- Kōfu
- Nanbu
- Ichikawamisato
- Hayakawa
- Fujikawa
- Fujikawaguchiko

Shizuoka Prefecture

- Aoi-ku, Shizuoka
- Fujinomiya

=== Climate ===
The town has a climate characterized by hot and humid summers, and relatively mild winters (Köppen climate classification Cfa). The average annual temperature in Minobu is 14.1 °C (57.4 °F). The average annual rainfall is 1,540 mm (61 in) with September as the wettest month. The temperatures are highest on average in August, at around 26.0 °C (78.8 °F), and lowest in January, at around 2.6 °C (36.7 °F).

Climate data for Kiriishi, Minobu (1991−2020 normals, extremes 1977−present)
| Month | Jan | Feb | Mar | Apr | May | Jun | Jul | Aug | Sep | Oct | Nov | Dec | Year |
|---|---|---|---|---|---|---|---|---|---|---|---|---|---|
| Record high °C (°F) | 17.7 (63.9) | 25.8 (78.4) | 26.7 (80.1) | 31.7 (89.1) | 33.5 (92.3) | 36.6 (97.9) | 39.7 (103.5) | 39.7 (103.5) | 36.5 (97.7) | 31.6 (88.9) | 26.1 (79.0) | 24.5 (76.1) | 39.7 (103.5) |
| Mean daily maximum °C (°F) | 9.1 (48.4) | 10.8 (51.4) | 14.3 (57.7) | 19.8 (67.6) | 24.1 (75.4) | 26.6 (79.9) | 30.4 (86.7) | 32.0 (89.6) | 28.0 (82.4) | 22.0 (71.6) | 16.6 (61.9) | 11.6 (52.9) | 20.4 (68.8) |
| Daily mean °C (°F) | 1.8 (35.2) | 3.6 (38.5) | 7.6 (45.7) | 13.0 (55.4) | 17.7 (63.9) | 21.2 (70.2) | 25.0 (77.0) | 26.1 (79.0) | 22.2 (72.0) | 16.1 (61.0) | 9.7 (49.5) | 4.2 (39.6) | 14.0 (57.3) |
| Mean daily minimum °C (°F) | −3.4 (25.9) | −2.1 (28.2) | 1.7 (35.1) | 6.9 (44.4) | 12.2 (54.0) | 17.1 (62.8) | 21.1 (70.0) | 22.0 (71.6) | 18.3 (64.9) | 12.1 (53.8) | 5.0 (41.0) | −0.9 (30.4) | 9.2 (48.5) |
| Record low °C (°F) | −11.7 (10.9) | −11.3 (11.7) | −7.9 (17.8) | −3.2 (26.2) | 1.6 (34.9) | 8.0 (46.4) | 14.4 (57.9) | 14.9 (58.8) | 6.7 (44.1) | 0.6 (33.1) | −4.0 (24.8) | −9.4 (15.1) | −11.7 (10.9) |
| Average precipitation mm (inches) | 60.5 (2.38) | 66.7 (2.63) | 126.9 (5.00) | 120.5 (4.74) | 134.7 (5.30) | 156.5 (6.16) | 181.3 (7.14) | 150.3 (5.92) | 285.0 (11.22) | 225.0 (8.86) | 87.0 (3.43) | 57.8 (2.28) | 1,652.1 (65.04) |
| Average precipitation days (≥ 1.0 mm) | 4.7 | 5.4 | 9.1 | 8.1 | 8.9 | 10.7 | 10.8 | 8.8 | 10.6 | 9.8 | 6.3 | 5.0 | 98.2 |
| Mean monthly sunshine hours | 188.6 | 178.5 | 190.0 | 200.0 | 201.8 | 146.1 | 168.6 | 205.8 | 148.5 | 146.7 | 164.0 | 180.6 | 2,120.4 |
Source: Japan Meteorological Agency

== Demographics ==
Per Japanese census data, the population of Minobu has declined substantially during the second half of the 20th century and in early 21st century; the town had a peak population of just under 40,000 and in 2020 recorded a population of 10,663 in the urban area.

Historical population
| Year | Pop. | ±% |
|---|---|---|
| 1950 | 39,550 | — |
| 1960 | 35,616 | −9.9% |
| 1970 | 27,697 | −22.2% |
| 1980 | 23,222 | −16.2% |
| 1990 | 20,849 | −10.2% |
| 2000 | 18,021 | −13.6% |
| 2010 | 14,462 | −19.7% |
| 2020 | 10,663 | −26.3% |

== History ==
Minobu developed from the Kamakura period as a temple town outside the gates of the important Buddhist temple of Kuon-ji, one of the primary head temples of the Nichiren Shū.

During the reform of the early Meiji period on April 1, 1889, Minamikoma District within Yamanashi Prefecture was created and organized into 22 villages. Minobu village was raised to town status on January 1, 1931. On February 11, 1955, the town expanded by annexing three neighboring villages. On September 13, 2004, Minobu absorbed the towns of Nakatomi, also from Minamikoma District, and Shimobe, from Nishiyatsushiro District.

== Education ==
- Minobusan University
- Minobu has three public elementary schools and one public junior high school operated by the town government. The town has two public high schools operated by the Yamanashi Prefectural Board of Education and one private high school.

== Popular culture ==
The Japanese manga Laid-Back Camp by Afro and its anime adaptation are set in Minobu, with both the main heroines' school and local markets featured in the show based on real-life facilities. According the Minobu government, after the show, Minobu's visitors has increased, and has gained local folk's confidence. It has been described as a successful case of community building, compared to how Girls und Panzer affects Ōarai, Ibaraki and Love Live! Sunshine!! affects Numazu.

== Transportation ==
=== Railway ===
- Central Japan Railway Company - Minobu Line
- Kai-Ōshima - Minobu - Shionosawa - Hadakajima - Shimobe-onsen - Kai-Tokiwa - Ichinose - Kunado

=== Highway ===
- National Route 51
- National Route 300

== Local attractions ==
- Kuon-ji – Buddhist temple which is the supreme head temple of Nichiren sect
- Nakayama Kinzan, ruins of a Sengoku period gold mine and National Historic Site
