= Minobusan University =

Japanese University

Coordinates: 35°22′55.33″N 138°25′29.98″E

- 身延山大学
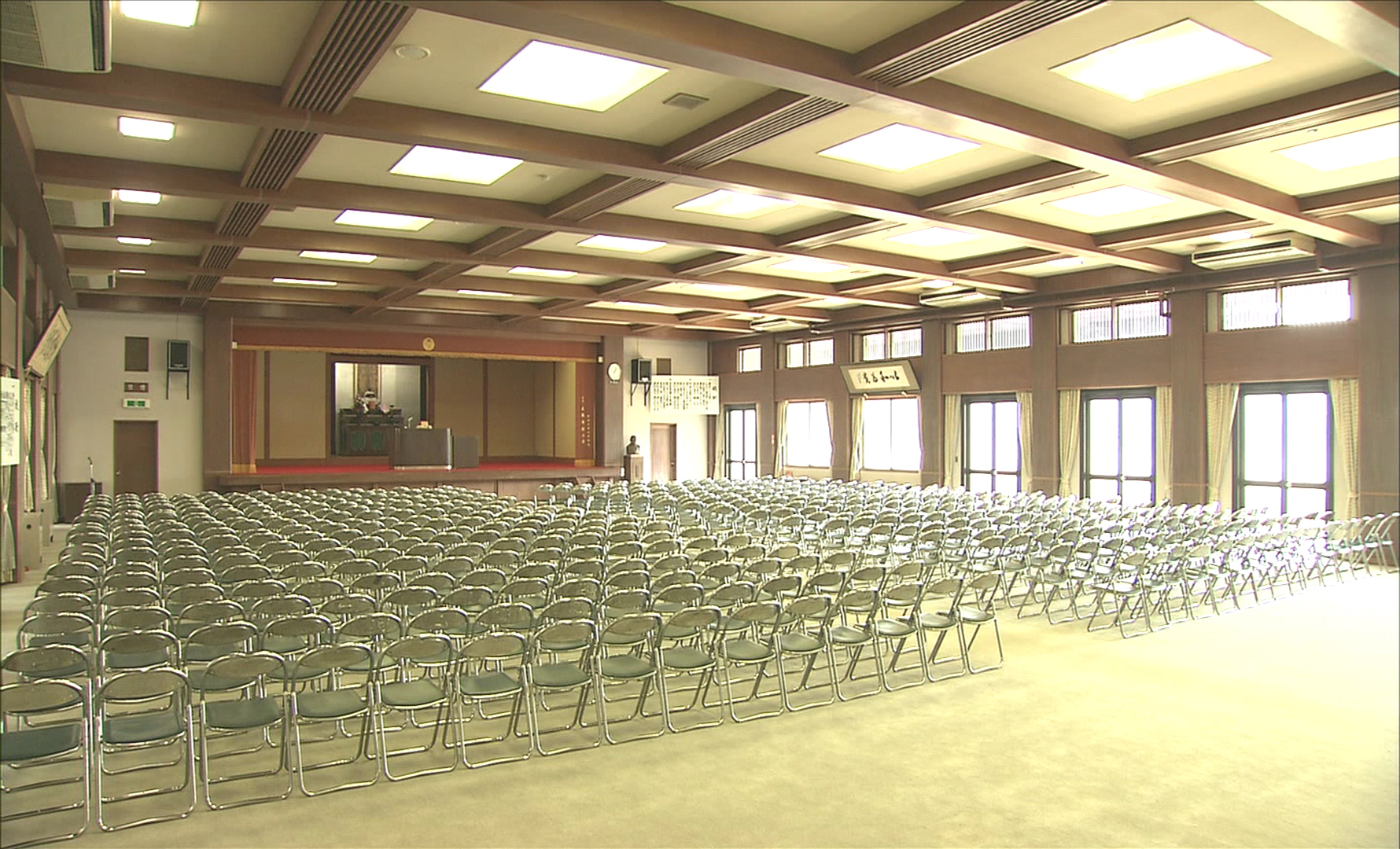
- Type: Private
- Established: 1994
- Location: Minobu, Yamanashi, Japan

Minobusan University (身延山大学, Minobusan daigaku) is a private university in Minobu, Yamanashi, Japan. The predecessor of the school was founded in 1556, and it was chartered as a university in 1994.
