= Minobu Station =

Railway station in Minobu, Yamanashi Prefecture, Japan

Minobu Station 身延駅
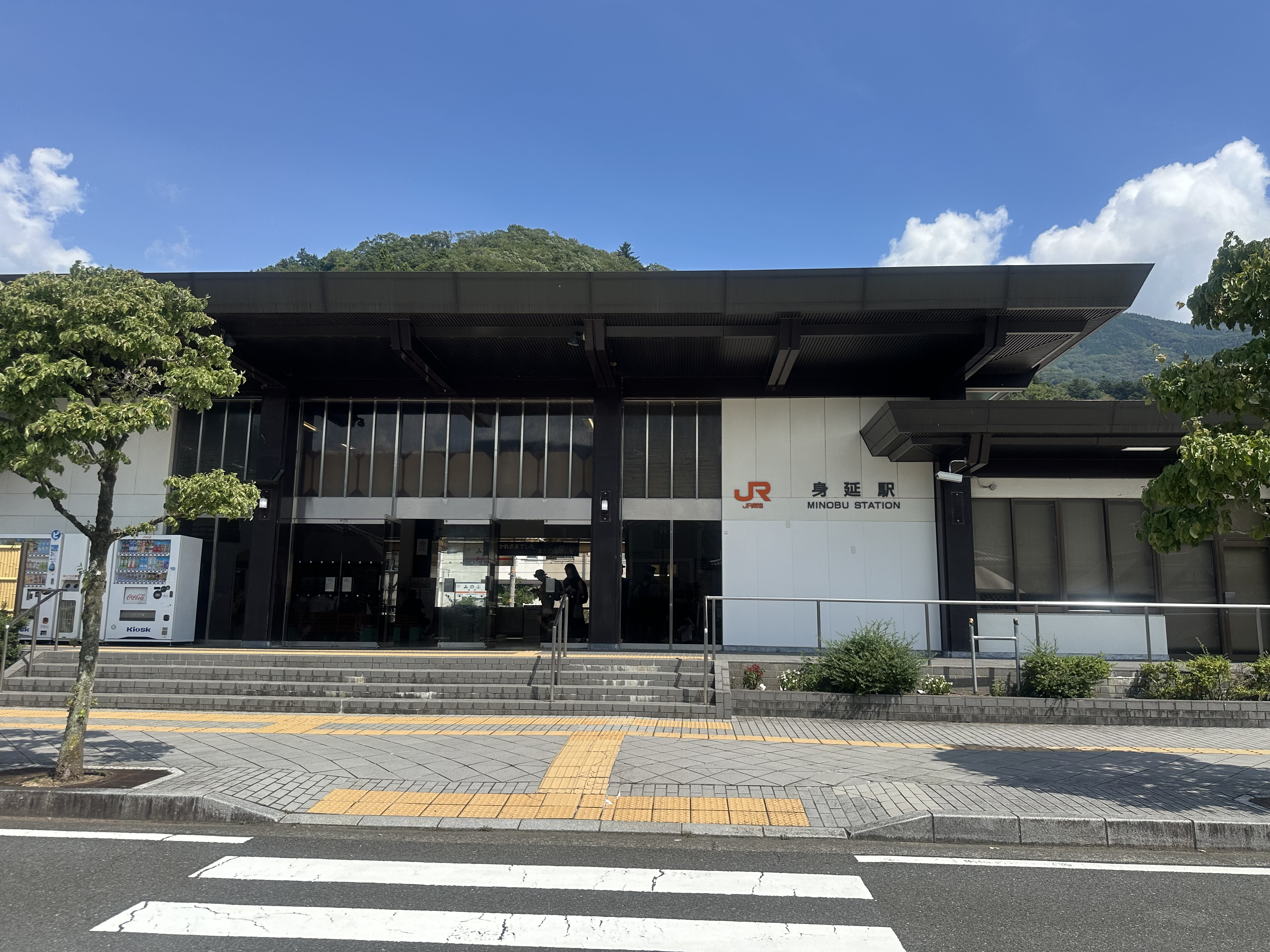
- Minobu Station, August 2025

General information
- Location: Tsunouchi, Minobu-cho, Minamikoma-gun, Yamanashi-ken; Japan
- Coordinates: 35.3620°N 138.4532°E
- Operator: JR Central
- Line: Minobu Line
- Distance: 58.8 kilometers from Fuji
- Platforms: 1 side + 1 island platform

Other information
- Status: Staffed

History
- Opened: May 18, 1920

Passengers
- FY2016: 357 daily
Location
- Location within Yamanashi Prefecture Location within Japan

Minobu Station (身延駅, Minobu-eki) is a railway station on the Minobu Line of Central Japan Railway Company (JR Central) located in the town of Minobu, Minamikoma District, Yamanashi Prefecture, Japan.

== Lines ==
Minobu Station is served by the Minobu Line and is located 43.5 kilometers from the southern terminus of the line at Fuji Station.

== Layout ==
Minobu Station has one side platform and one island platform connected by an underground passage. The station is staffed.

=== Platform ===
1	■ Minobu Line	For Kōfu, Fuji
2	■ Minobu Line	For Kōfu
3	■ Minobu Line	For Fuji, Kōfu

== Adjacent stations ==
«	Service	»
Minobu Line
Utsubuna	Limited Express Fujikawa	Shimobe-onsen
Kai-Ōshima	Local	Shionosawa

== History ==
Minobu Station was opened on May 18, 1920 as the terminal station on the original Fuji-Minobu Line. The line was extended to Ichikawa-Daimon Station in December 1927, and came under control of the Japanese Government Railways on May 1, 1941. The JGR became the JNR (Japan National Railway) after World War II. A new station building was completed in June 1980. Along with the division and privatization of JNR on April 1, 1987, the station came under the control and operation of the Central Japan Railway Company.

== Surrounding area ==
- Fuji River
- Minobu High School
- Minobu Elementary School

== See also ==
- List of railway stations in Japan
