= Minamikoma District, Yamanashi =

Rural district located in southern Yamanashi Prefecture, Japan

Coordinates: 35.417°N 138.412°E

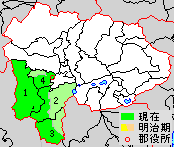
Map showing original extent of Minamikoma District in dark green, with areas added since 2000 in light green: 1. Hayakawa; 2. Minobu; 3. Nanbu; 4. Fujikawa

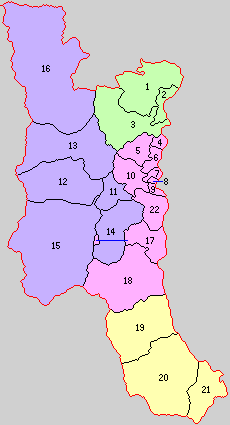
Colored areas are in this district.

Minamikoma (南巨摩郡, Minamikoma-gun) is a rural district located in southern Yamanashi Prefecture, Japan.

As of 1 October 2020, the district had an estimated population of 33,136 with a density of 33,65 persons per km^{2}. The total area is 984.8 km^{2}.

== Municipalities ==
The district consists of four towns:

- Fujikawa (Note: Classified as a town.)
- Hayakawa
- Minobu
- Nanbu

== History ==
=== District Timeline ===
Minamikoma District was founded from the split of Koma District during the early Meiji period establishment of the municipalities system on July 22, 1878 and initially consisted of 22 villages.

=== Recent mergers ===
- On March 1, 2003 - The town of Tomizawa was merged into the expanded town of Nanbu.
- On September 13, 2004 - The towns of Nakatomi and Shimobe (from Nishiyatsushiro District) were merged into the expanded town of Minobu.
- On March 8, 2010 - The towns of Masuho and Kajikazawa were merged to form the new town of Fujikawa.
