= The Great Wave off Kanagawa =

Woodblock print by Hokusai (1831)

- 神奈川沖浪裏, Kanagawa-oki Nami Ura
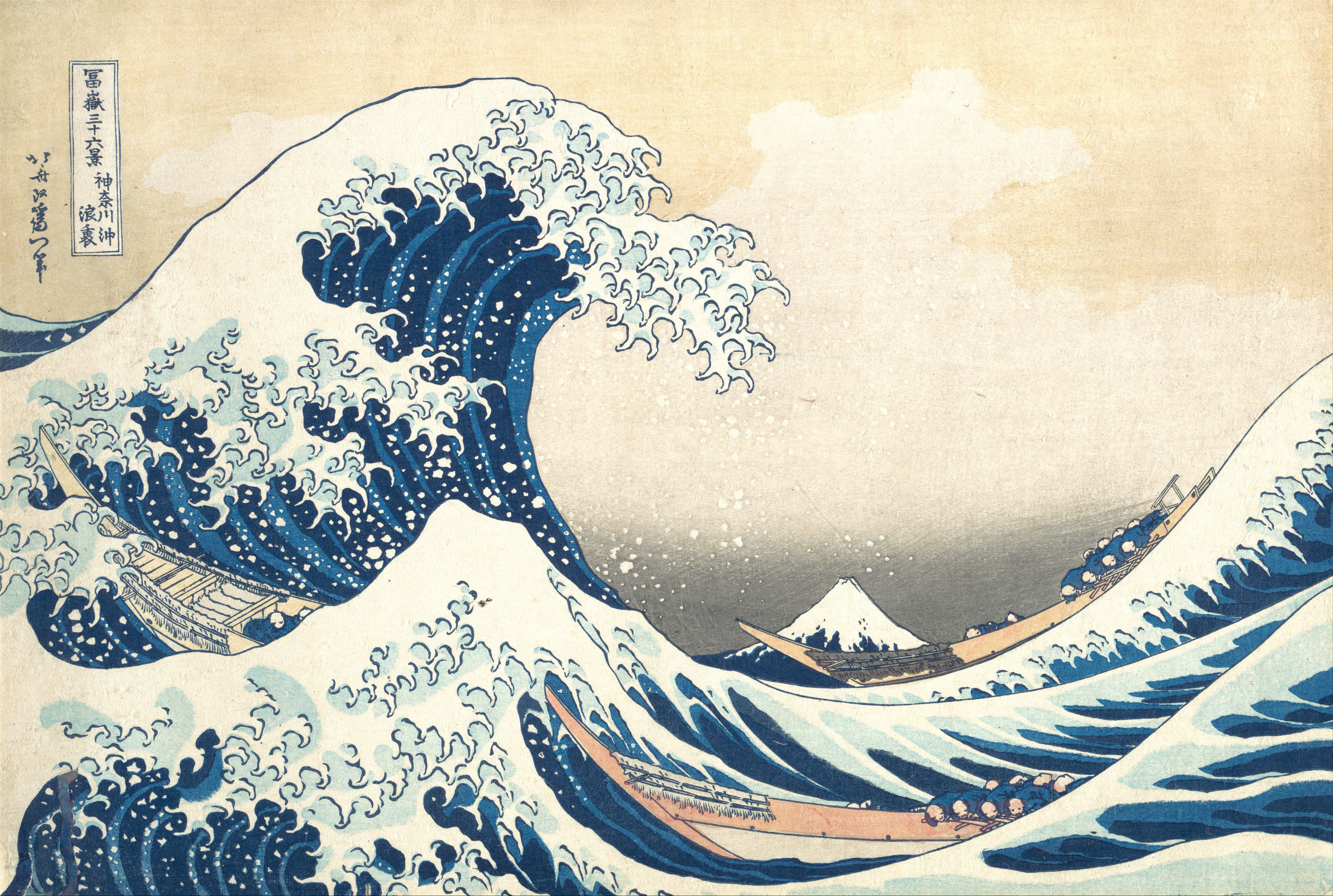
- Print at the Metropolitan Museum of Art
- Artist: Katsushika Hokusai
- Year: 1831
- Type: Ukiyo-e (woodblock print)
- Dimensions: 24.6 cm × 36.5 cm (9.7 in × 14.4 in)

The Great Wave off Kanagawa (Japanese: 神奈川沖浪裏, Hepburn: Kanagawa-oki Nami Ura; lit. 'Under the Wave off Kanagawa') (Note: Also known as The Great Wave or simply The Wave) is a woodblock print by the Japanese ukiyo-e artist Hokusai (1760–1849), created in late 1831 during the Edo period of Japanese history. The print depicts three boats moving through a storm-tossed sea, with a large, cresting wave forming a spiral in the centre over the boats and Mount Fuji in the background.

The print is Hokusai's best-known work and the first in his series Thirty-six Views of Mount Fuji, in which the use of Prussian blue revolutionised Japanese prints. The composition of The Great Wave is a synthesis of traditional Japanese prints and use of graphical perspective developed in Europe, and earned him immediate success in Japan and later in Europe, where Hokusai's art inspired works by the Impressionists. Several museums throughout the world hold copies of The Great Wave, many of which came from 19th-century private collections of Japanese prints. Only about 100 prints, in varying conditions, are thought to have survived into the 21st century.

The Great Wave off Kanagawa has been described as "possibly the most reproduced image in the history of all art", as well as being a contender for the "most famous artwork in Japanese history". This woodblock print has influenced several Western artists and musicians, including Claude Debussy, Vincent van Gogh and Claude Monet. Hokusai's younger colleagues Hiroshige and Utagawa Kuniyoshi were inspired to make their own wave-centric works.

== Context ==
=== Ukiyo-e art ===
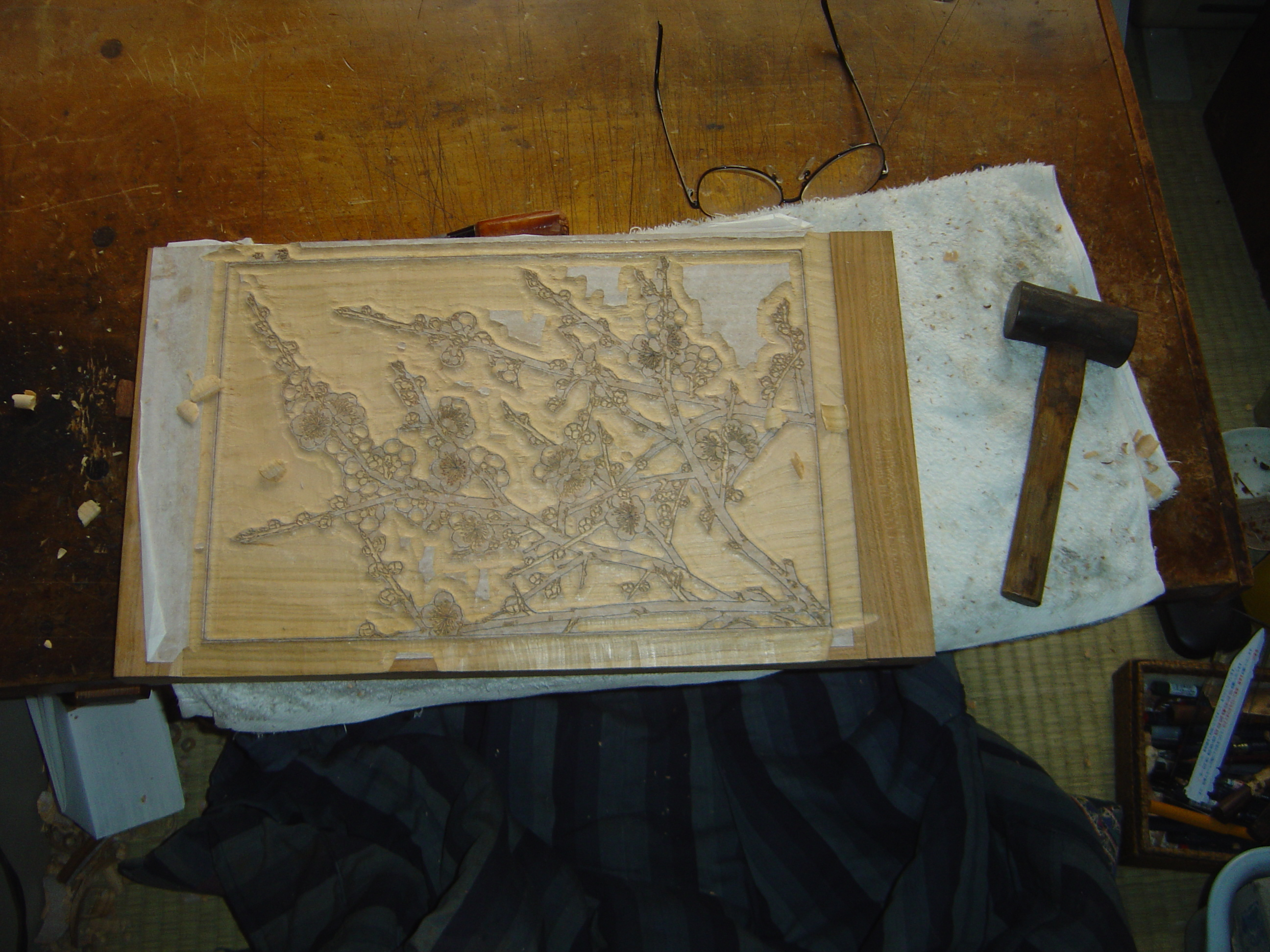
Plate used to print ukiyo-e

Ukiyo-e is a Japanese printmaking technique which flourished in the 17th through 19th centuries. Its artists produced woodblock prints and paintings of subjects including female beauties; kabuki actors and sumo wrestlers; scenes from history and folk tales; travel scenes and landscapes; Japanese flora and fauna; and erotica. The term ukiyo-e (浮世絵) translates as "picture[s] of the floating world".

After Edo (called Tokyo since 1868) became the seat of the ruling Tokugawa shogunate in 1603, the chōnin class of merchants, craftsmen and workers benefited most from the city's rapid economic growth, and began to indulge in and patronise the entertainment of kabuki theatre, geisha, and courtesans of the pleasure districts. The term ukiyo came to describe this hedonistic lifestyle. Printed or painted ukiyo-e works were popular with the chōnin class, who had become wealthy enough to afford to decorate their homes with them.

The earliest ukiyo-e works, Hishikawa Moronobu's paintings and monochromatic prints of women, emerged in the 1670s. Colour prints were introduced gradually, and at first were only used for special commissions. By the 1740s artists such as Okumura Masanobu used multiple woodblocks to print areas of colour. In the 1760s the success of Suzuki Harunobu's "brocade prints" led to full-colour production becoming standard, with ten or more blocks used to create each print. Some ukiyo-e artists specialised in creating paintings, but most works were prints. Artists rarely carved their own woodblocks; production was divided between the artist, who designed the prints; the carver, who cut the woodblocks; the printer, who inked and pressed the woodblocks onto hand-made paper; and the publisher who financed, promoted, and distributed the works. As printing was done by hand, printers were able to achieve effects impractical with machines, such as the blending or gradation of colours on the printing block.

=== Artist ===
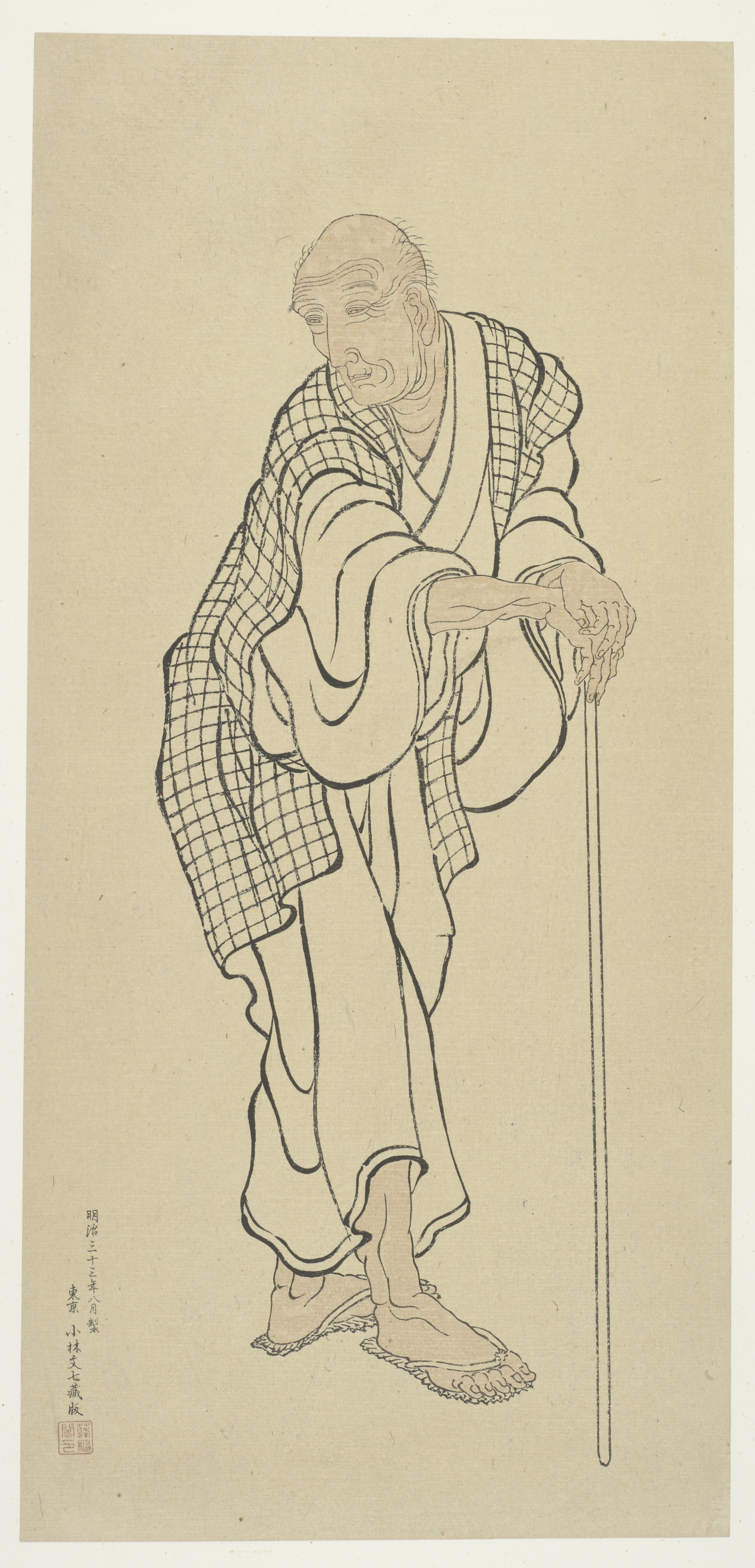
Hokusai, 1839 self-portrait

Katsushika Hokusai was born in Katsushika, Japan, in 1760 in a district east of Edo. He was the son of a shogun mirror-maker, and at the age of 14 he was named Tokitarō. Because Hokusai was never recognised as an heir, it is likely his mother was a concubine.

Hokusai began painting when he was six years old, and when he was twelve his father sent him to work in a book shop. At sixteen he became an engraver's apprentice, which he remained for three years while also beginning to create his own illustrations. At eighteen Hokusai was accepted as an apprentice to the artist Katsukawa Shunshō, one of the greatest ukiyo-e artists of his time. When Shunshō died in 1793, Hokusai studied Japanese and Chinese styles, as well as some Dutch and French paintings on his own. In 1800 he published Famous Views of the Eastern Capital and Eight Views of Edo, and began to accept trainees. During this period he began to use the name Hokusai; during his life he would use more than 30 pseudonyms.

In 1804 Hokusai rose to prominence when he created a 240-square-metre (2,600 sq ft) drawing of a Buddhist monk named Daruma for a festival in Tokyo. Due to his precarious financial situation, in 1812 he published Quick Lessons in Simplified Drawing, and began to travel to Nagoya and Kyoto to recruit more students. In 1814 he published the first of 15 manga; volumes of sketches of subjects that interested him, such as people, animals, and Buddha. He published his famous series Thirty-six Views of Mount Fuji in the late 1820s; it was so popular he later had to add ten more prints. Hokusai died in 1849 at the age of 89.

According to Calza (2003), years before his death Hokusai stated,

From the age of six, I had a passion for copying the form of things and since the age of fifty I have published many drawings, yet of all I drew by my seventieth year there is nothing worth taking into account. At seventy-three years I partly understood the structure of animals, birds, insects and fishes, and the life of grasses and plants. And so, at eighty-six I shall progress further; at ninety I shall even further penetrate their secret meaning, and by one hundred I shall perhaps truly have reached the level of the marvellous and divine. When I am one hundred and ten, each dot, each line will possess a life of its own.

== Description ==
The Great Wave off Kanagawa is a landscape-format yoko-e print that was produced in an ōban size of 25 cm × 37 cm (9.8 in × 14.6 in). The landscape is composed of three elements: a stormy sea, three boats, and a mountain. The artist's signature is visible in the upper left-hand corner.

=== Mountain ===
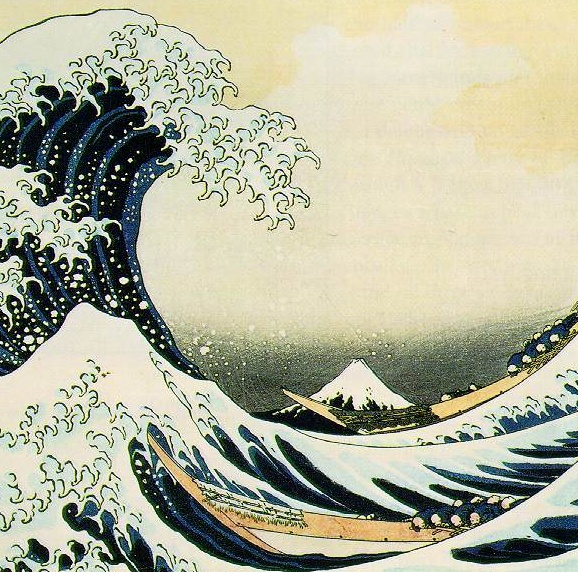
Detail of the centre of the image. In the background is Mount Fuji in blue with a snow-capped peak.

In the background is Mount Fuji and its snow-capped summit; Mount Fuji is the central figure of the Thirty-six Views of Mount Fuji series, which depicts the mountain from different angles. In The Great Wave off Kanagawa, Mount Fuji is depicted in blue with white highlights in a similar way to the wave in the foreground. The dark colour surrounding the mountain appears to indicate the painting is set in the early morning, with the sun rising from the viewer's vantage point and beginning to illuminate the snowy peak. There are cumulonimbus clouds between the mountain and the viewer; although these clouds typically indicate a storm, there is no rain on Fuji or in the main scene.

=== Boats ===
The scene shows three oshiokuri-bune, fast barges that were used to transport live fish from the Izu and Bōsō peninsulas to markets in Edo Bay. According to analysis by Cartwright and Nakamura (2009), the boats are located in Edo (Tokyo) Bay off the present-day Kanagawa-ku, Yokohama, with Edo to the north and Mount Fuji to the west. The boats are facing south, likely to Sagami Bay to collect a cargo of fish for sale in Edo. Each boat has eight rowers who are holding their oars. At the front of each boat are two more relief crew members; 30 men are represented in the picture but only 22 are visible. The size of the wave can be approximated using the boats as a reference: the oshiokuri-bune were generally between 12 and 15 metres (39 and 49 ft) long. Taking into account Hokusai reduced the vertical scale by 30%, the wave is between 10 and 12 metres (33 and 39 ft) high.

=== Sea and waves ===
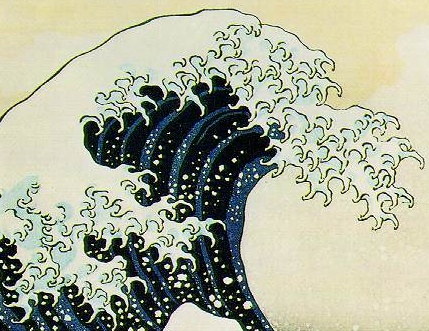
Fractal-like detail of the crest of the wave, similar in appearance to "claws"

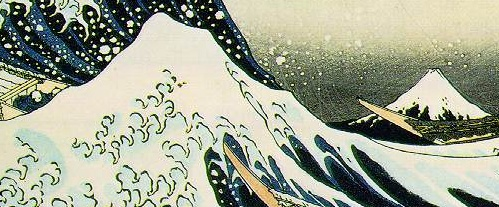
Detail of the small wave, which has a shape similar to the silhouette of Mount Fuji itself

The sea dominates the composition, which is based on the shape of a wave that spreads out and dominates the entire scene before falling. At this point, the wave forms a perfect spiral with its centre passing through the centre of the design, allowing viewers to see Mount Fuji in the background. The image is made up of curves, with the water's surface being an extension of the curves inside the waves. The big wave's foam-curves generate other curves, which are divided into many small waves that repeat the image of the large wave. Edmond de Goncourt, a French writer, described the wave as follows:

[Drawing] board that was supposed to have been called The Wave. It is much like that almost deified drawing, [created] by a painter gripped by religious terror of a formidable sea that surrounded his country: a drawing that shows [the wave's] angry ascent to the sky, the deep azure of the curl's transparent interior, the tearing of its crest that scatters in a shower of droplets in the form of an animal's claws.

The wave is generally described as that produced by a tsunami, a giant wave or more likely a rogue wave, but also as a monstrous or ghostly wave like a white skeleton threatening the fishermen with its "claws" of foam. This interpretation of the work recalls Hokusai's mastery of Japanese fantasy, which is evidenced by the ghosts in his Hokusai Manga. An examination of the wave on the left side reveals many more "claws" that are ready to seize the fishermen behind the white foam strip. This image recalls many of Hokusai's previous works, including his Hyaku Monogatari series One Hundred Ghost Stories, produced from 1831 to 1832, which more explicitly depicts supernatural themes. The wave's silhouette resembles that of a dragon, which the author frequently depicts, even on Mount Fuji.

=== Signature ===
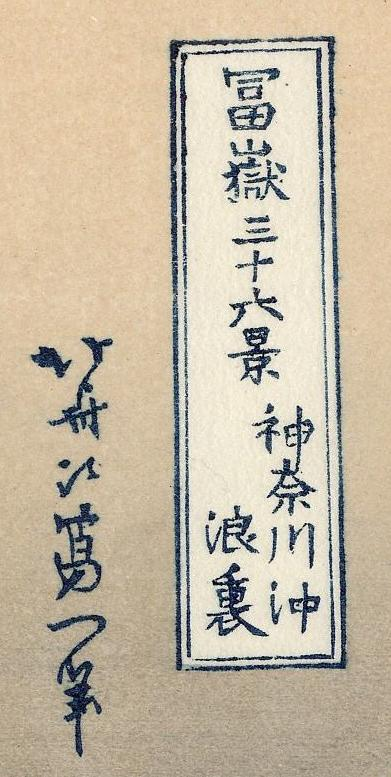
Hokusai's signature

The Great Wave off Kanagawa has two inscriptions. The title of the series is written in the upper-left corner within a rectangular frame, which reads: "冨嶽三十六景/神奈川沖/浪裏" Fugaku Sanjūrokkei / Kanagawa oki / nami ura, meaning "Thirty-six views of Mount Fuji / On the high seas in Kanagawa / Under the wave". The inscription to the left of the box bears the artist's signature: 北斎改爲一筆 Hokusai aratame Iitsu hitsu which reads as "(painting) from the brush of Hokusai, who changed his name to Iitsu". Due to his humble origins, Hokusai had no surname; his first nickname Katsushika was derived from the region he came from. Throughout his career, Hokusai used over 30 names and never started a new cycle of work without changing his name, sometimes leaving his name to his students.

=== Depth and perspective ===
Depth and perspective (uki-e) work in The Great Wave off Kanagawa stand out, with a strong contrast between background and foreground. Two great masses dominate the visual space: the violence of the great wave contrasts with the serenity of the empty background, evoking the dualist concept of yin and yang. Man, powerless, struggles between the two, which may be a reference to Buddhist philosophy (in which human things and affairs are ephemeral), as represented by the boats being swept away by the giant wave, and Shinto (an especially Japanese concept, in which nature is omnipotent).

=== Reading direction ===
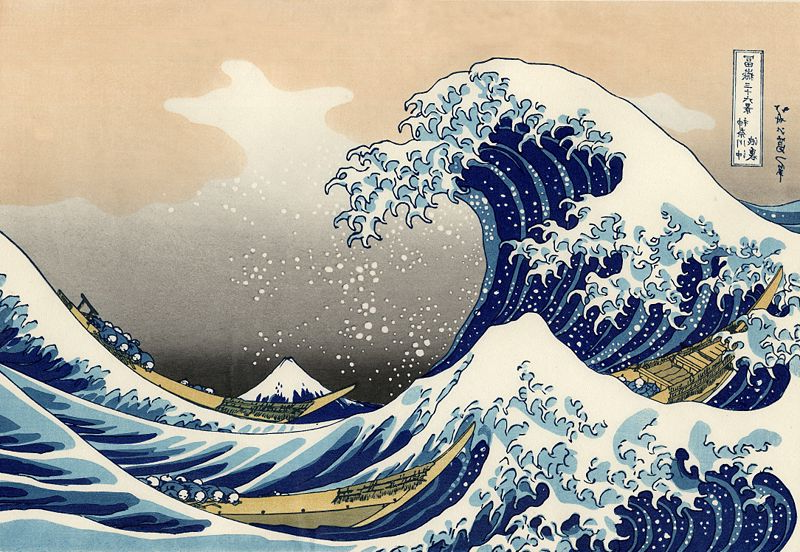
Inverted image

According to some, The Great Wave off Kanagawa is "best viewed" from right to left. This is traditional for Japanese paintings, as Japanese script, when written vertically, is also read from right to left. Analyzing the boats in the image, particularly that at the top, reveals the slender, tapering bow faces left, implying the Japanese interpretation is correct. The boats' appearances can also be analysed in Hokusai's print Sōshū Chōshi from the series Chie no umi ("Oceans of Wisdom"), in which the boat moves against the current in a rightward direction, as shown by the boat's wake.

== Creation ==
Hokusai faced numerous challenges during the composition of The Great Wave off Kanagawa. In 1826, whilst in his sixties, he suffered financial difficulty, and in 1827 apparently suffered a serious health problem, probably a stroke. His wife died the following year, and in 1829 he had to rescue his grandson from financial problems, a situation that pushed Hokusai into poverty. Despite sending his grandson to the countryside with his father in 1830, the financial ramifications continued for several years, during which time he was working on Thirty-six Views of Mount Fuji. Cartwright and Nakamura (2009) interpret Hokusai's tribulations as the source of the series' powerful and innovative imagery. Hokusai's goal for the series appears to have been depicting the contrast between the sacred Mount Fuji and secular life.

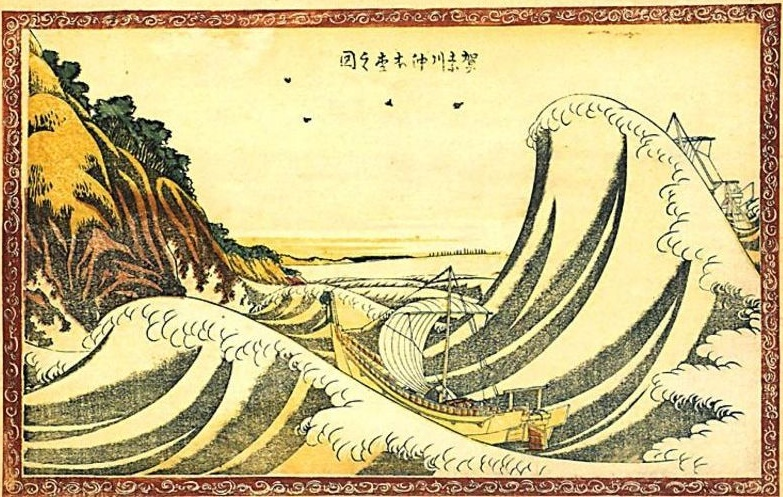
Kanagawa-oki Honmoku no zu, created around 1803

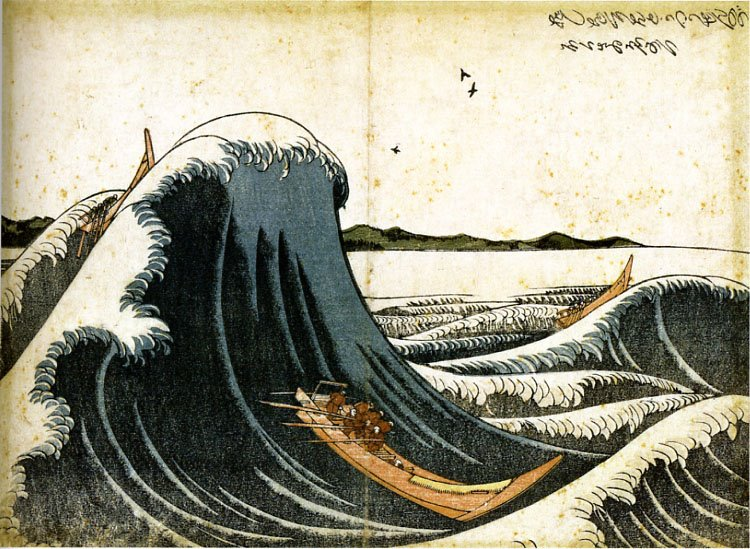
Oshiokuri Hato Tsusen no Zu, created around 1805

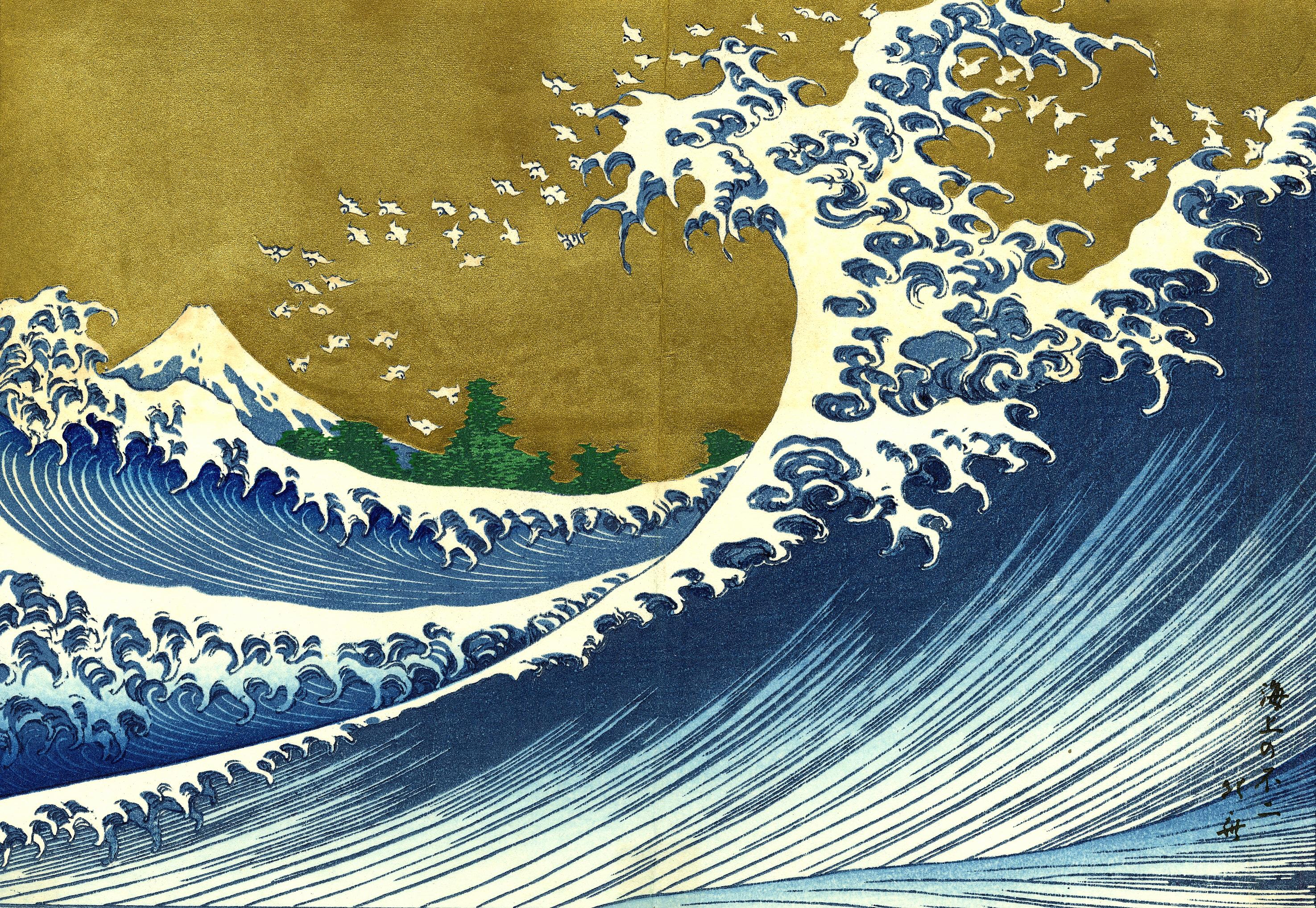
Kaijo no Fuji, from the second volume of the 100 Views of Mount Fuji, 1834

After several years of work and other drawings, Hokusai arrived at the final design for The Great Wave off Kanagawa in late 1831. Two similar works from around 30 years before the publication of The Great Wave can be considered forerunners: Kanagawa-oki Honmoku no Zu and Oshiokuri Hato Tsusen no Zu, both of which depict a boat (a sailing boat in the former, and a rowing boat in the latter) in the midst of a storm and at the base of a great wave that threatens to engulf them. Hokusai is also thought to have drawn on the Rinpa school paintings of Ogata Kōrin (1658–1716) and Sakai Hōitsu (1761–1829): one of the illustrations in Hōitsu's ehon Ōson gafu (1817) shows clear similarities between its own wave and the one Hokusai would later depict. The Great Wave off Kanagawa demonstrates Hokusai's drawing skill. The print, though simple in appearance to the viewer, is the result of a lengthy process of methodical reflection. Hokusai established the foundations of this method in his 1812 book Quick Lessons in Simplified Drawing, in which he explains that any object can be drawn using the relationship between the circle and the square: "The book consists of showing the technique of drawing using only a ruler and a compass ... This method starts with a line and the most naturally obtained proportion". He continues in the book's preface: "All forms have their own dimensions which we must respect ... It must not be forgotten that such things belong to a universe whose harmony we must not break".

Hokusai returned to the image of The Great Wave a few years later when he produced Kaijo no Fuji for the second volume of One Hundred Views of Fuji. This print features the same relationship between the wave and the mountain, and the same burst of foam. There are no humans or boats in the latter image, and the wave fragments coincide with the flight of birds. While the wave in The Great Wave moves in the opposite direction of the Japanese reading – from right to left – the wave and birds in Kaijo no Fuji move in unison.

== Western influence on the work ==
=== Perspective ===
The concept of perspective prints arrived in Japan in the 18th century. These prints rely on a single-point perspective rather than a traditional foreground, middle ground, and background, which Hokusai consistently rejected. Objects in traditional Japanese painting and Far Eastern painting in general were not drawn in perspective but rather, as in ancient Egypt, the sizes of objects and figures were determined by the subject's importance within the context.

Perspective, which was first used in Western paintings by the 15th-century artists Paolo Uccello and Piero della Francesca, was introduced to Japanese artists through Western – particularly Dutch – merchants arriving in Nagasaki. Okumura Masanobu and especially Utagawa Toyoharu made the first attempts to imitate the use of Western perspective, producing engravings depicting the canals of Venice or the ruins of ancient Rome in perspective as early as 1750.

Toyoharu's work greatly influenced Japanese landscape painting, which evolved with the works of Hiroshige – an indirect student of Toyoharu through Toyohiro – and Hokusai. Hokusai became acquainted with Western perspective in the 1790s through Shiba Kōkan's investigations, from whose teaching he benefited. Between 1805 and 1810 Hokusai published the series Mirror of Dutch Pictures – Eight Views of Edo.

The Great Wave off Kanagawa would not have been as successful in the West if audiences did not have a sense of familiarity with the work. It has been interpreted as a Western play seen through the eyes of a Japanese. According to Richard Lane:

Western students first seeing Japanese prints almost invariably settle upon these two late masters [Hokusai and Hiroshige] as representing the pinnacle of Japanese art, little realizing that part of what they admire is the hidden kinship they feel to their own Western tradition. Ironically enough, it was this very work of Hokusai and Hiroshige that helped to revitalize Western painting toward the end of the nineteenth century, through the admiration of the Impressionists and Post-impressionists.

=== "Blue revolution" ===
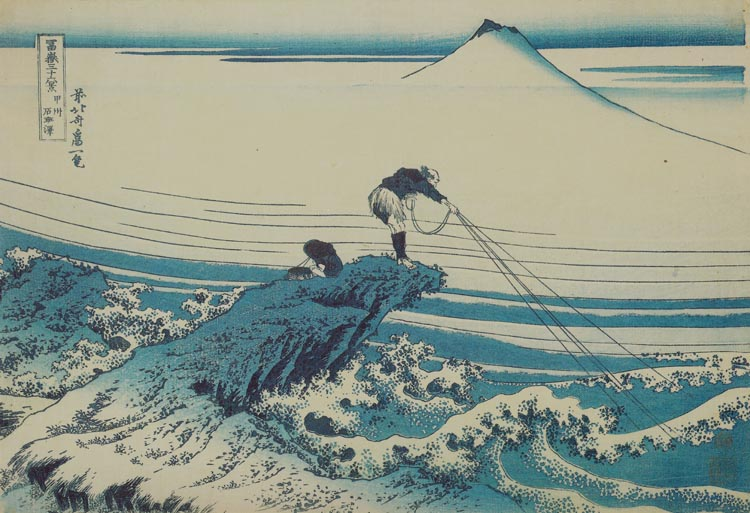
Kōshū Kajikazawa, "Kajikazawa in Kai Province", aizuri-e style

During the 1830s Hokusai's prints underwent a "blue revolution", in which he made extensive use of the dark-blue pigment Prussian blue. He used this shade of blue, which was resistant to fading, for The Great Wave off Kanagawa with indigo, the delicate, quickly fading shade of blue that was commonly used in ukiyo-e works at the time.

Prussian blue, also known in Japanese at the time as Berlin ai (ベルリン藍; abbreviated to bero ai (ベロ藍), literally "Berlin indigo"), was imported from Holland beginning in 1820, and was extensively used by Hiroshige and Hokusai after its arrival in Japan in large quantities in 1829.

The first 10 prints in the series, including The Great Wave off Kanagawa, are among the first Japanese prints to feature Prussian blue, which was most likely suggested to the publisher in 1830. This innovation was an immediate success. In early January 1831 Hokusai's publisher Nishimuraya Yohachi (Eijudō) widely advertised the innovation, and the following year published the next 10 prints in the Thirty-six Views of Mount Fuji series, and unique for their predominantly-blue aizuri-e style, with Kōshū Kajikazawa ("Kajikazawa in Kai Province") being a notable example. In addition to the extensive use of Prussian blue, the outlines on these 10 supplementary prints, known collectively as ura Fuji ("Fuji seen from behind"), are sumi black with India ink.

== Prints in the world ==
About 1,000 copies of The Great Wave off Kanagawa were initially printed, resulting in wear in later editions of print copies. It is estimated approximately 8,000 copies were eventually printed. (Note: As Capucine Korenberg writes, "The number of impressions made from a given set of woodblocks was generally not recorded but it has been estimated that a publisher had to sell at least 2,000 impressions from a design to make a profit".) As of 2022, 113 original impressions of the first edition are known to survive worldwide, with the greatest proportion (35) in American museums. (Note: Out of 111 copies of the print found by Korenberg, 26 have no discernible clouds.)

The first signs of wear are in the pink and yellow of the sky, which fades more in worn copies, resulting in vanishing clouds, a more uniform sky, and broken lines around the box containing the title. Some of the surviving copies have been damaged by light, as woodblock prints of the Edo period used light sensitive colourants. Collections housing the print include the Japan Ukiyo-e Museum in Matsumoto, the British Museum in London, the Metropolitan Museum of Art in New York City, the Art Institute of Chicago, the Los Angeles County Museum of Art, the Sackler Gallery in Washington, D.C., the Giverny Museum of Impressionisms in Giverny, the Musée Guimet and the Bibliothèque nationale de France both in Paris, the Edoardo Chiossone Museum of Oriental Art in Genoa, the Palazzo Maffei Casa Museo in Verona, the National Gallery of Victoria in Melbourne, the Civico museo d'arte orientale in Trieste, the Museo d'arte orientale in Turin, the Bavarian State Library in Munich, the Museum of Fine Arts in Boston, and the Rijksmuseum in Amsterdam. Some private collections such as the Gale Collection also have copies.

== Museums with first editions ==
=== Australia ===
- National Gallery of Victoria, Melbourne (1)

=== Austria ===
- Museum of Applied Arts, Vienna (1)

=== Belgium ===
- Royal Museums of Fine Arts of Belgium, Brussels (1)

=== Canada ===
- Royal Ontario Museum, Toronto (1)

=== France ===
- Giverny Museum of Impressionism (1)
- French National Library, Paris (2)
- Guimet Museum, Paris (2)

=== Germany ===
- Bavarian State Library, Munich (1)
- Dresden State Art Collections (1)
- Grassi Museum of Applied Arts, Leipzig (1)
- Museum of Arts and Crafts, Hamburg (1)
- Museum of East Asian Art, Cologne (1)

=== Israel ===
- Tikotin Museum, Haifa (1)

=== Italy ===
- Edoardo Chiossone Museum of Oriental Art, Genoa (1)
- Civic Museum of Oriental Art, Trieste (1)
- Museum of Oriental Art, Turin (1)

=== Japan ===
- Edo-Tokyo Museum (1)
- Hagi Uragami Museum, Yamaguchi (1)
- Hokusai Museum, Obuse (1)
- Isago no Sato Museum, Kawasaki (1)
- Japan Ukyo-e Museum, Matsumato (1)
- Keio University Library, Tokyo (1)
- Museum of Art, Atami (1)
- Ota Memorial Museum of Art, Tokyo (2)
- Shimane Art Museum, Matsue (1)
- Sumida Hokusai Museum, Tokyo (1)
- Tokyo National Museum (3)
- Tokyo Fuji Art Museum (1)
- Yamatane Museum of Art, Tokyo (1)

=== Netherlands ===
- Rijksmuseum, Amsterdam (1)

=== Poland ===
- National Museum, Krakow (1)

=== UK ===
- British Museum, London (3)
- Bristol Museum and Art Gallery (1)
- Victoria & Albert Museum, London (1)
- Maidstone Museum (1)
- Dulwich Picture Gallery (1)

=== USA ===
- Art Institute of Chicago (3)
- Brigham Young University Museum of Art, Provo (1)
- Chazen Museum of Art, Madison (1)
- Cincinnati Art Museum (1)
- D'Amour Museum of Fine Arts, Springfield (1)
- Hammer Museum, Los Angeles (1)
- Harvard Art Museums, Cambridge (1)
- Hill-Stead Museum, Farmington (1)
- Honolulu Museum of Art (1)
- Legion of Honor Museum, San Francisco (1)
- Los Angeles County Museum of Art (1)
- Metropolitan Museum of Art, New York (4)
- Minneapolis Institute of Art (1)
- Museum of Fine Arts, Boston (7)
- Nelson-Atkins Museum of Art, Kansas City (1)
- Reading Public Museum (1)
- Portland Museum of Art (1)
- Rhode Island School of Design Museum, Providence (1)
- Saint Louis University Museum of Art (1)
- Seattle Art Museum (1)
- Spencer Museum of Art, Lawrence (1)
- Toledo Museum of Art (1)
- University of Michigan Museum of Art, Ann Arbor (1)
- Yale University Art Gallery, New Haven (1)

Nineteenth-century private collectors were frequently the source of museum collections of Japanese prints; for example, the copy in the Metropolitan Museum came from Henry Osborne Havemeyer's former collection, which his wife donated to the museum in 1929. The copy in the Bibliothèque nationale de France came from the collection of Samuel Bing in 1888, and the copy in the Musée Guimet is a bequest from Raymond Koechlin, who gave it to the museum in 1932.

In 2023 one of the prints that had been held by a private family since the early 1900s and for a time was displayed at the Glyptotek, Copenhagen, was sold for a record price, US$2.8 million.

On 22 November 2025, another print, held by the Okada Museum of Art, was sold at Sotheby's for US$2.8 million in Hong Kong. This was to resolve a debt between Kazuo Okada and casino mogul Steve Wynn.

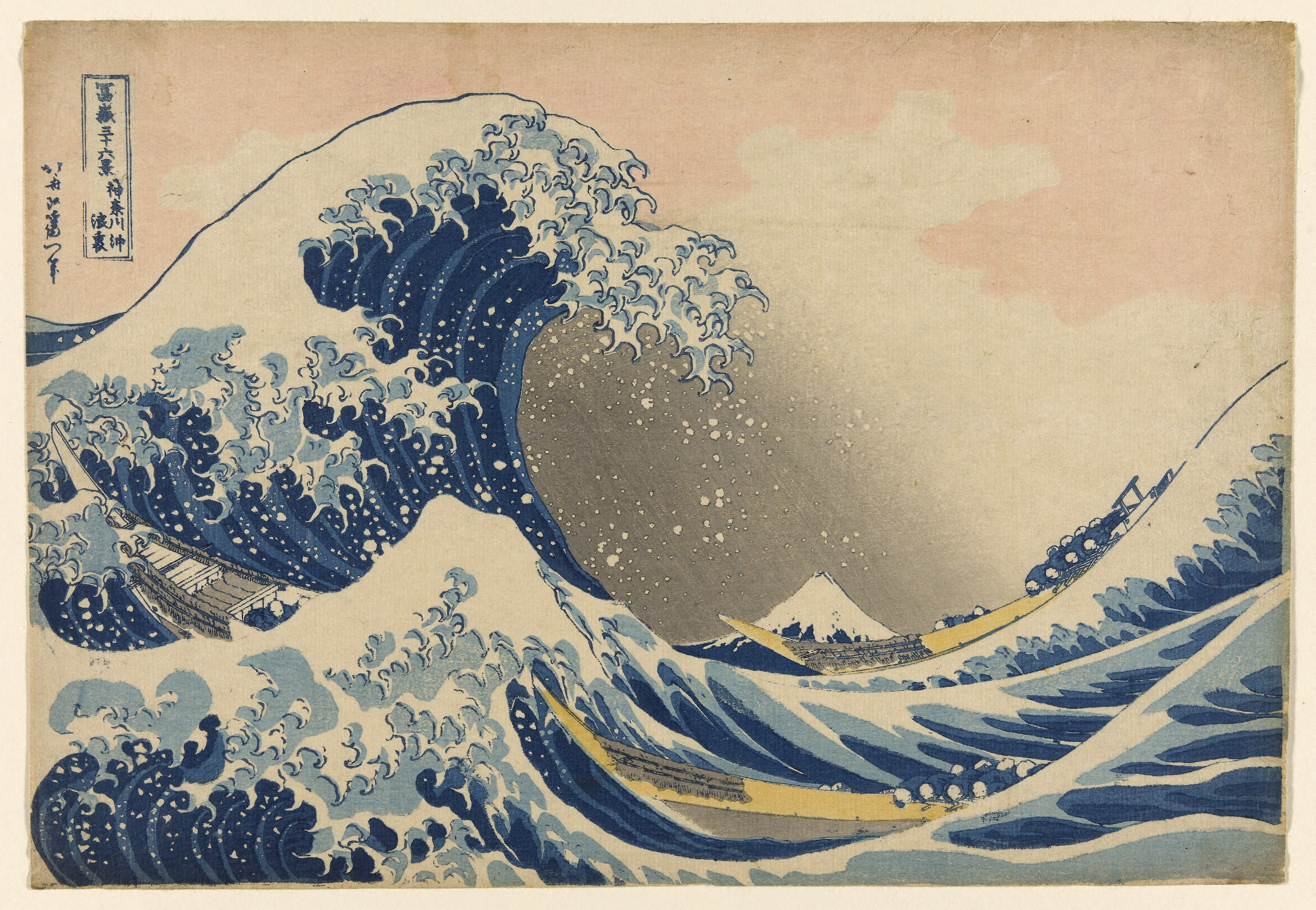
Print at the Art Institute of Chicago

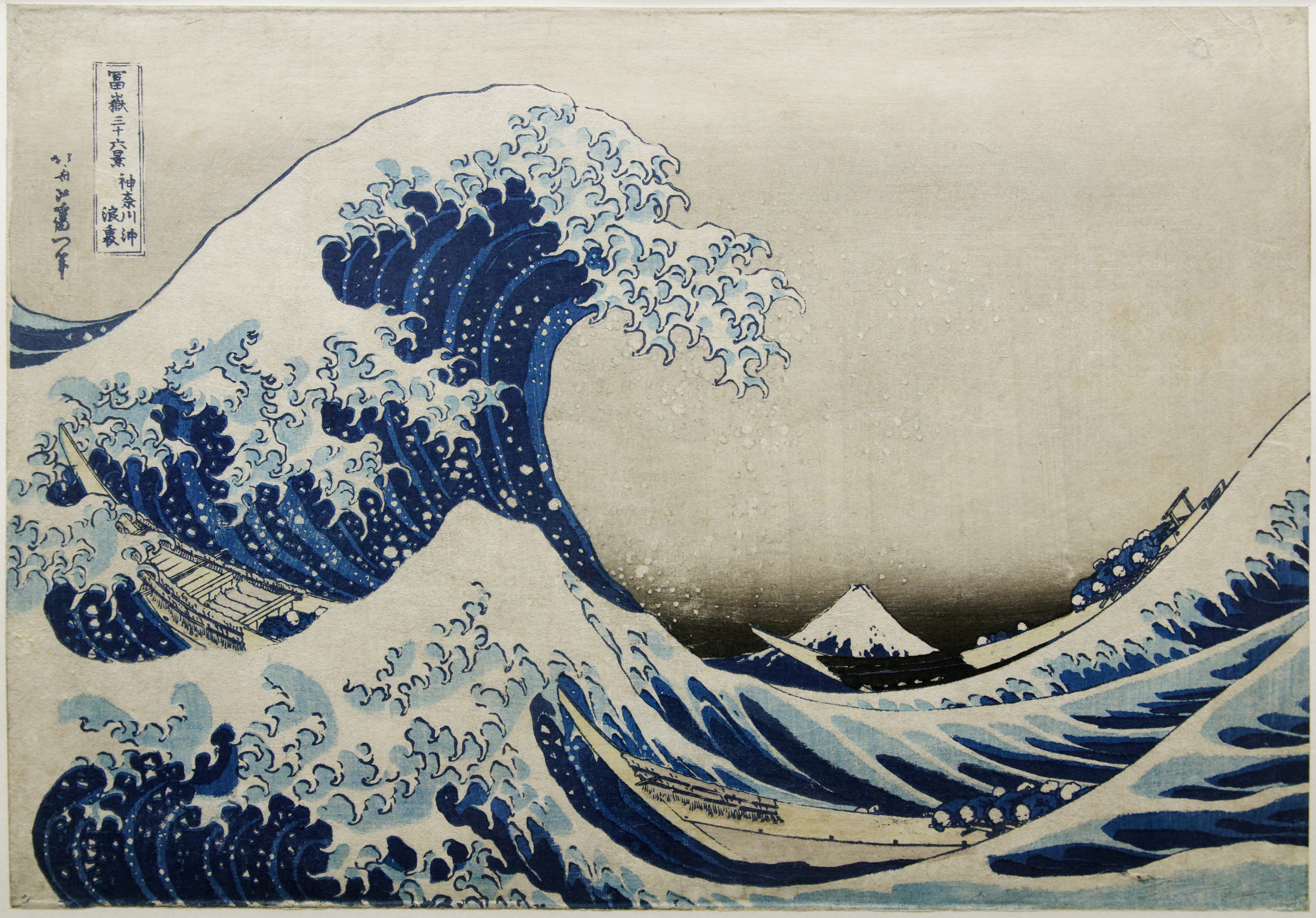
Print at The British Museum

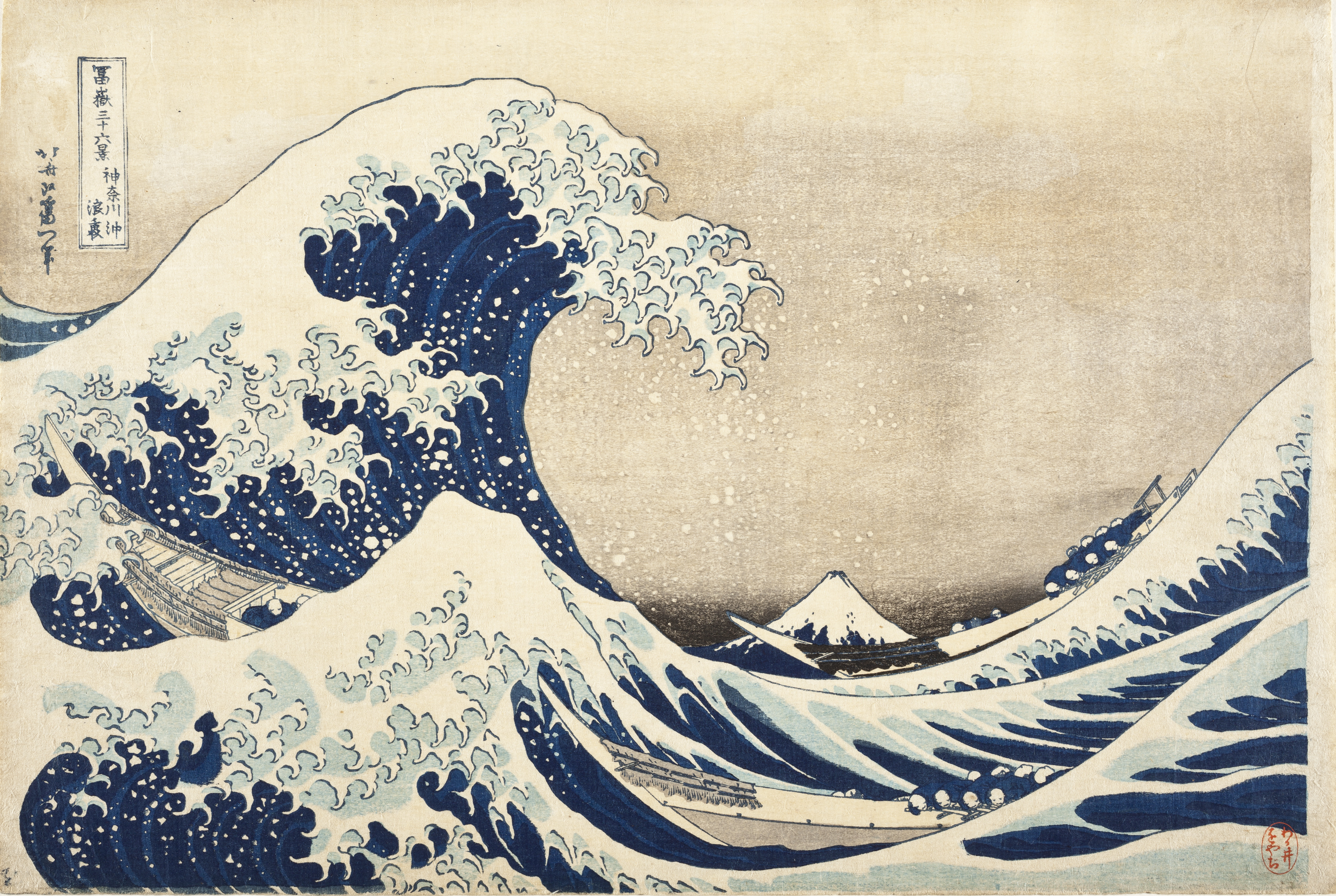
Print at the Los Angeles County Museum of Art

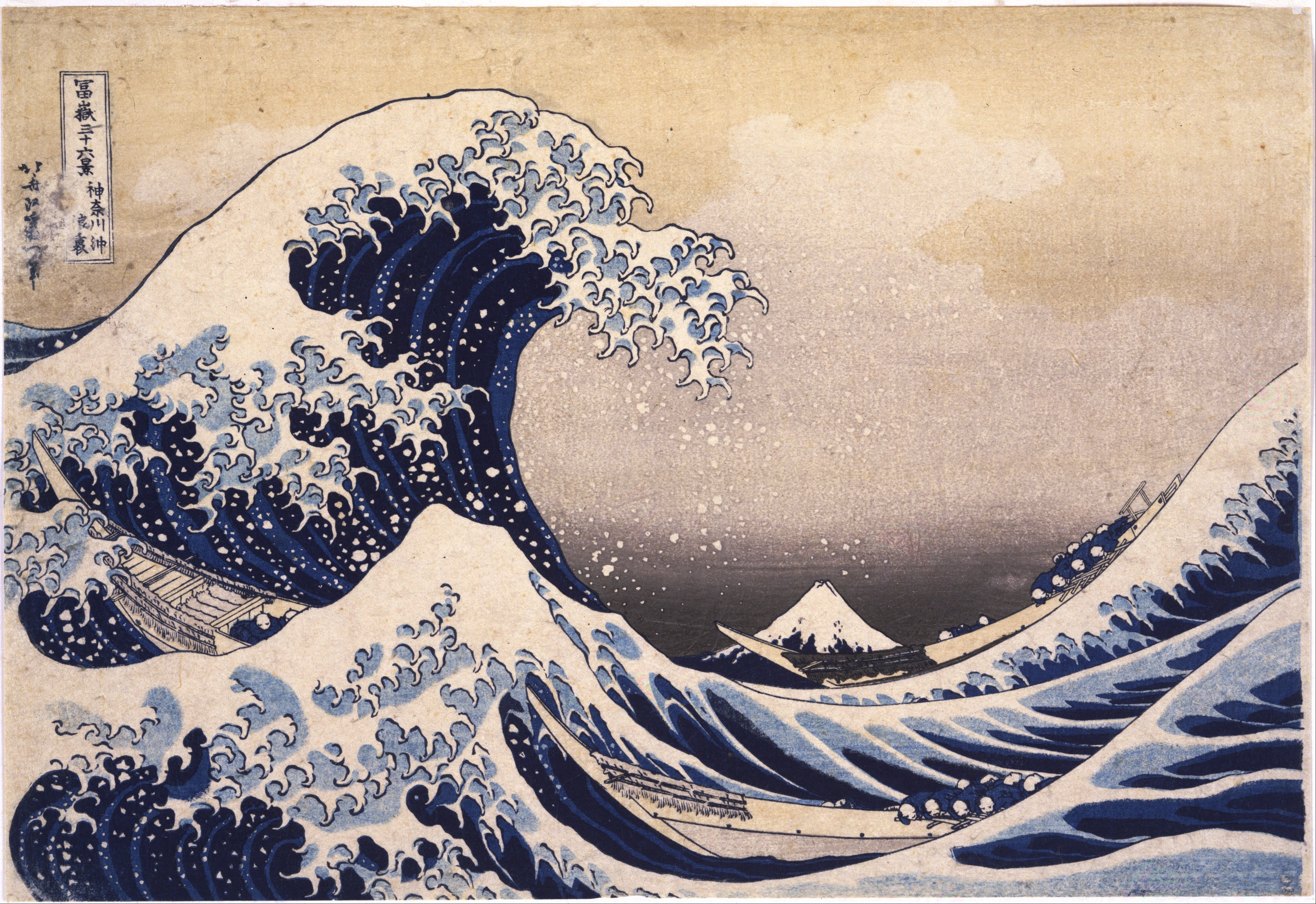
Print at the Tokyo National Museum

== Influence ==
=== Western culture ===
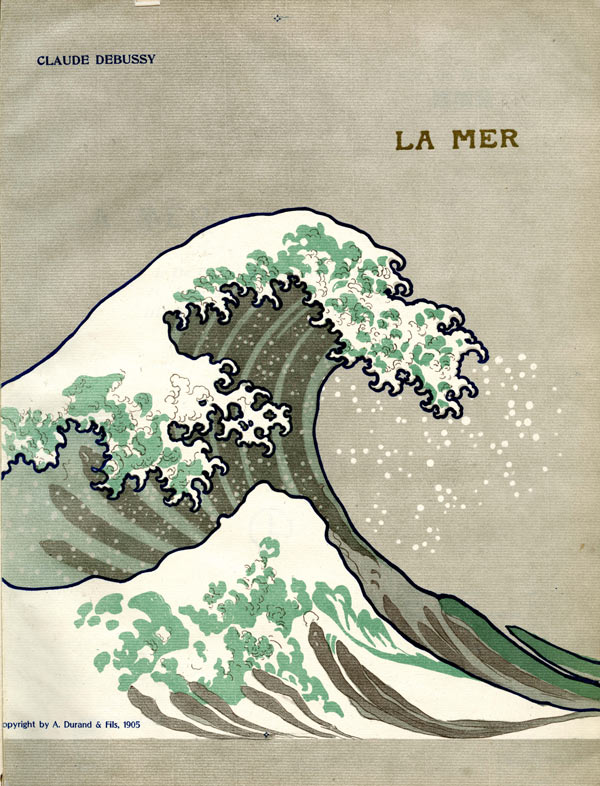
Original 1905 cover of Claude Debussy's La Mer

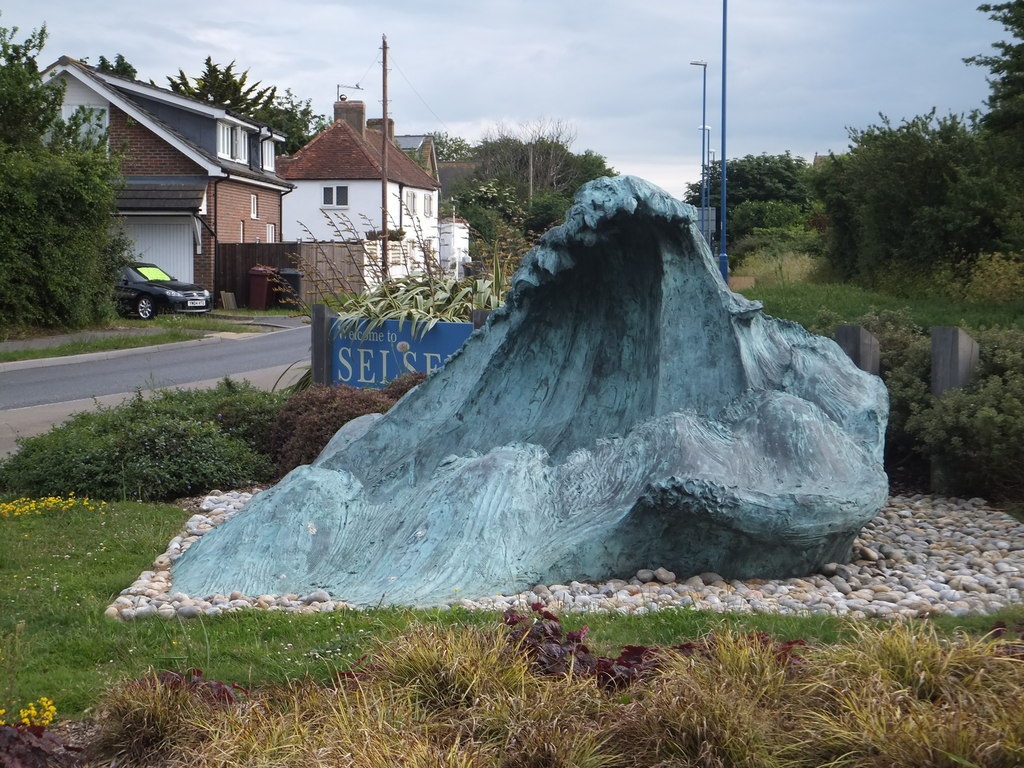
The Selsey Wave by the sculptor William Pye, at the entrance to Selsey, England, is a three-dimensional homage to The Great Wave off Kanagawa.

After the 1868 Meiji Restoration, Japan ended a long period of isolation and opened to imports from the West. In turn, much Japanese art was exported to Europe and America, and quickly gained popularity. The influence of Japanese art on Western culture became known as Japonisme. Japanese woodblock prints inspired Western artists in many genres, particularly the Impressionists.

As the most famous Japanese print, The Great Wave off Kanagawa influenced great works: in painting, works by Claude Monet; in music, Claude Debussy's La Mer; and in literature, Rainer Maria Rilke's Der Berg. Claude Debussy, who loved the sea and painted images of the Far East, kept a copy of The Great Wave off Kanagawa in his studio. During his work on La Mer, he was inspired by the print and asked for the image to be used on the cover of the original 1905 score.

Henri Rivière, a draughtsman, engraver, and watercolourist who was also an important figure behind the Paris entertainment venue Le Chat Noir, was one of the first artists to be heavily influenced by Hokusai's work, particularly The Great Wave off Kanagawa. In homage to Hokusai's work, Rivière published a series of lithographs titled The Thirty-Six Views of the Eiffel Tower in 1902. Rivière was a collector of Japanese prints who purchased works from Siegfried Bing, Tadamasa Hayashi, and Florine Langweil.

Vincent van Gogh, a great admirer of Hokusai, praised the quality of drawing and use of line in The Great Wave off Kanagawa, and wrote it had a "terrifying" emotional impact. French sculptor Camille Claudel's La Vague (1897) replaced the boats in Hokusai's The Great Wave off Kanagawa with three women dancing in a circle.

William Pye's sculpture Kanagawa was inspired by the work of Hokusai, who Pye says was influenced by "the immense power of nature as manifested in great waves on the sea". He suggests that people are "free to interpret [his sculpture] in any way they wish, be it as a wake-up call to implement sea defenses or as a memorial to those who have suffered at the hands of the sea". He also says that "he was driven by the sheer beauty of wave forms and the challenge of capturing this in bronze".

=== In popular culture ===
Wayne Crothers, the curator of a 2017 Hokusai exhibition at the National Gallery of Victoria, described The Great Wave off Kanagawa as "possibly the most reproduced image in the history of all art" while the Wall Street Journal's Ellen Gamerman wrote it "may be the most famous artwork in Japanese history". Hiroshige paid homage to The Great Wave off Kanagawa with his print The Sea off Satta in Suruga Province while French artist Gustave-Henri Jossot produced a satirical painting in the style of The Great Wave off Kanagawa to mock the popularity of Japonisme.

Many modern artists have reinterpreted and adapted the image. Indigenous Australian artist Lin Onus used The Great Wave off Kanagawa as the basis for his 1992 painting Michael and I are just slipping down to the pub for a minute. A work named Uprisings by Japanese-American artist Kozyndan is based on the print; the foam of the wave is replaced with rabbits. On computer operating systems designed by Apple Inc., the emoji character for a water wave (🌊) strongly resembles the wave depicted in the print. In 2022 the Bank of Japan announced The Great Wave off Kanagawa's inclusion in a redesign of Japan's banknotes to begin circulation in 2024.

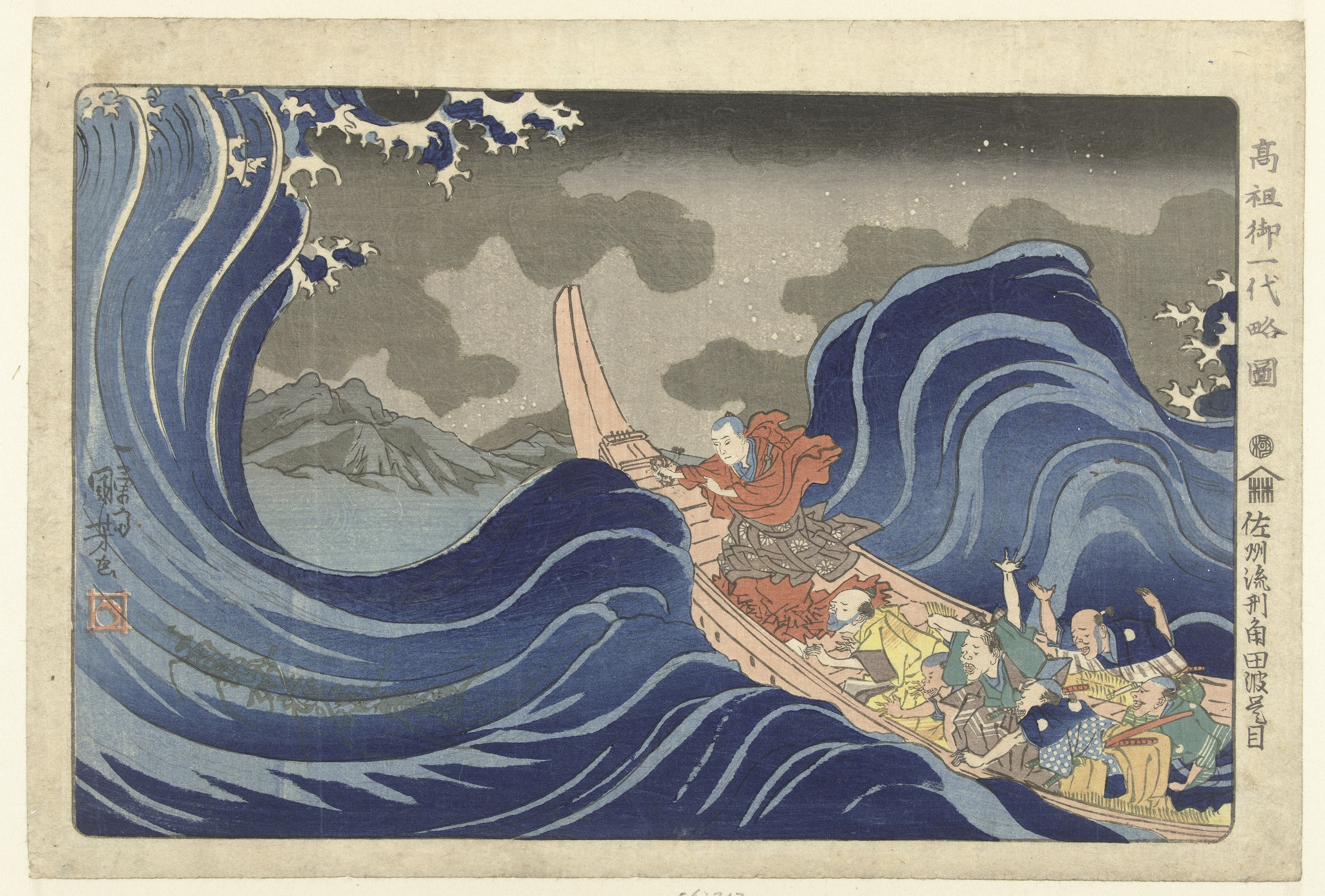
Monk Nichiren Calming the Stormy Sea by Utagawa Kuniyoshi (c. 1835)

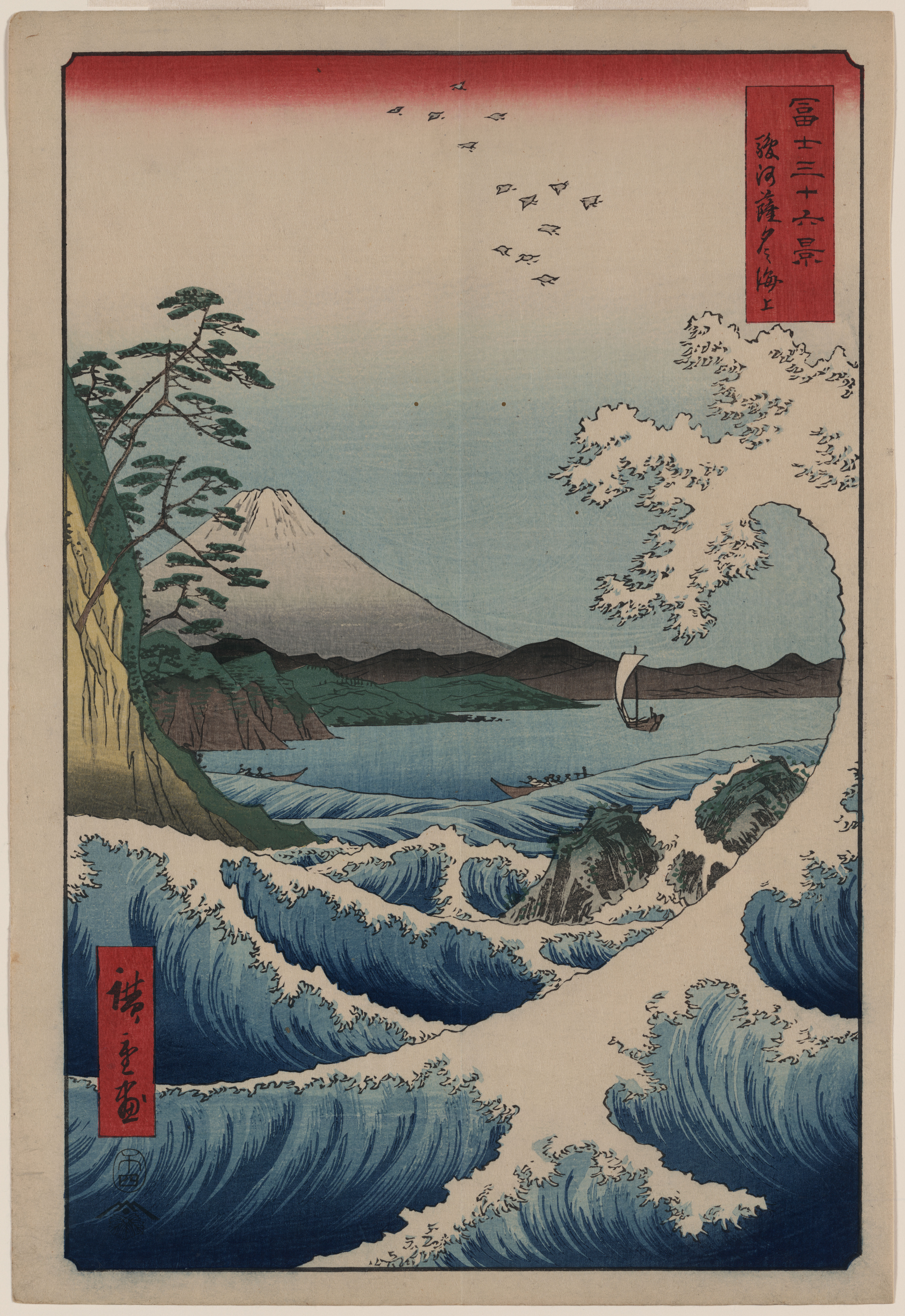
The Sea off Satta in Suruga Province by Hiroshige (1858)

The Wave, lithograph by Gustave-Henri Jossot (1894)

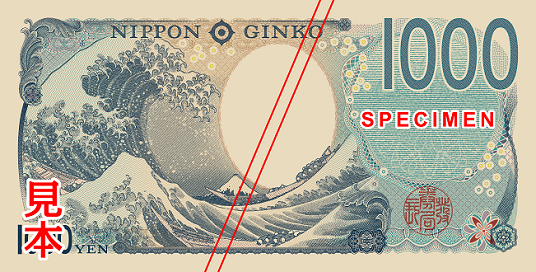
Japanese 1,000 yen banknote issued in 2024

=== Media ===
Special television programmes and documentaries about The Great Wave off Kanagawa have been produced; these include the 30-minute, French-language documentary La menace suspendue: La Vague (1995) and a 2004 English-language special programme part of the BBC series The Private Life of a Masterpiece. The Great Wave off Kanagawa is also the subject of the 93rd episode of the BBC Radio series A History of the World in 100 Objects produced in collaboration with the British Museum, which was released on 4 September 2010. A replica of The Great Wave off Kanagawa was created for a documentary film about Hokusai released by the British Museum in 2017.

== General and cited sources ==
- Ashcroft, Bill (26 July 2013). "Hybridity and Transformation: The Art of Lin Onus". Postcolonial Text. 8 (1). Archived from the original on 19 June 2021.
- Bayou, Hélène (2008). Hokusai 1760–1849 – "L'affolé de son art" d'Edmond de Goncourt à Norbert Lagane (in French). Paris: Réunion des Musées Nationaux. ISBN 978-2-7118-5406-6.
- Estampes japonaises: images d'un monde éphémère (in French). Bibliothèque nationale de France. 2008. ISBN 978-84-89860-93-3.
- Bickford, Lawrence (1993). "Ukiyo-e Print History". Impressions (17): 1. JSTOR 42597774.
- Calza, Gian Carlo (2003). Hokusai. London: Phaidon. ISBN 978-0-7148-4304-9.
- Cartwright, Julyan H. E.; Nakamura, Hisami (20 June 2009). "What kind of a wave is Hokusai's Great wave off Kanagawa?". Notes and Records of the Royal Society. 63 (2): 119–135. doi:10.1098/rsnr.2007.0039. S2CID 35033146.
- Delay, Nelly (2004). L'estampe japonaise (in French). Paris: F. Hazan. ISBN 978-2-85025-807-7.
- Dudley, J. M.; Sarano, V.; Dias, F. (2013). "On Hokusai's Great wave off Kanagawa: localization, linearity and a rogue wave in sub-Antarctic waters". Notes and Records of the Royal Society of London. 67 (2): 159–164. doi:10.1098/rsnr.2012.0066. ISSN 0035-9149. PMC 3645210. PMID 24687148.
- Forrer, Matthi (1991). Hokusai: Prints and Drawings. Neues Publishing Company. ISBN 978-3-7913-1131-9.
- Goncourt, Edmond de (15 September 2015). Hokusai. Parkstone International. ASIN B016XN14YS.
- Guth, Christine (2011). "Hokusai's Great Waves in Nineteenth-Century Japanese Visual Culture" (PDF). The Art Bulletin. 93 (4): 468–485. doi:10.1080/00043079.2011.10786019. ISSN 0004-3079. PMID 00043079. S2CID 191470775. Archived (PDF) from the original on 20 July 2020.
- Harris, James C. (January 2008). "Under the Wave off Kanagawa". JAMA Psychiatry. 65 (1): 12–13. doi:10.1001/archgenpsychiatry.2007.21. PMID 18180422. Archived from the original on 11 March 2022.
- Hillier, Jack (1970). Gale Catalogue of Japanese Paintings and Prints in the Collection of Mr. & Mrs. Richard P. Gale. Vol. 2. Routledge. ISBN 978-0-7100-6913-9.
- Honour, Hugh; Fleming, John (1991). A World History of Art. Tres Cantos, Madrid: Laurence King Publishing. ISBN 978-1-85669-000-3. Archived from the original on 17 June 2022.
- Ives, Colta Feller (1974). The Great Wave: the Influence of Japanese Woodcuts on French Prints. Metropolitan Museum of Art. ISBN 978-0-87099-228-5.
- Kikuchi, Sadao; Kenny, Don (1969). A Treasury of Japanese Wood Block Prints (Ukiyo-e). Crown Publishers. OCLC 21250.
- Kobayashi, Tadashi (1997). Harbison, Mark A. (ed.). Ukiyo-e: An Introduction to Japanese Woodblock Prints. Kodansha International. ISBN 978-4-7700-2182-3.
- Lane, Richard (1962). Masters of the Japanese Print, Their World and Their Work. Creative Media Partners, LLC. ISBN 978-1-01-530023-1.
- Médicis, François de; Huebner, Steven, eds. (2018). Debussy's Resonance. Boydell & Brewer. ISBN 978-1-58046-525-0.
- Moore, Janet Gaylord (1979). The Eastern Gate: An Invitation to the Arts of China and Japan. Collins. ISBN 978-0-529-05434-0.
- Nagata, Seiji (1995). Hokusai: Genius of the Japanese Ukiyo-e. Kodansha. ISBN 978-4-7700-1928-8.
- Ornes, Stephen (2014). "Science and Culture: Dissecting the "Great Wave"". Proceedings of the National Academy of Sciences of the United States of America. 111 (37): 13245. Bibcode:2014PNAS..11113245O. doi:10.1073/pnas.1413975111. ISSN 0027-8424. PMC 4169912. PMID 25228754.
- Penkoff, Ronald (1964). Roots of the Ukiyo-e; Early Woodcuts of the Floating World (PDF). Ball State Teachers College. OCLC 681751700. Archived (PDF) from the original on 2 June 2022.
- Salter, Rebecca (2001). Japanese Woodblock Printing. University of Hawaii Press. ISBN 978-0-8248-2553-9. Archived from the original on 17 May 2022.
- Sueur-Hermel, Valérie (2009). Henri Rivière: entre impressionnisme et japonisme (in French). Paris: Bibliothèque nationale de France. ISBN 978-2-7177-2431-8.
- Singer, Robert T. (March–April 1986). "Japanese Painting of the Edo Period". Archaeology. 39 (2). Archaeological Institute of America: 64–67. JSTOR 41731745.
- Weston, Mark (2002). Giants of Japan: The Lives of Japan's Greatest Men and Women. Kodansha International. ISBN 978-1-56836-324-0.
