= Yu Hasegawa =

Japanese footballer

Yu Hasegawa 長谷川 悠
Personal information
- Full name: Yu Hasegawa
- Date of birth: 5 July 1987 (age 39)
- Place of birth: Masuho, Yamanashi, Japan
- Height: 1.87 m (6 ft 2 in)
- Position: Striker

Team information
- Current team: Nankatsu SC

Youth career
- 2003–2005: RKU Kashiwa High School

Senior career*
Years	Team	Apps	(Gls)
2006–2009	Kashiwa Reysol	1	(0)
2006	→ FC Gifu (loan)	4	(1)
2007	→ Avispa Fukuoka (loan)	9	(0)
2008–2009	→ Montedio Yamagata (loan)	70	(23)
2010–2011	Montedio Yamagata	48	(3)
2012–2014	Omiya Ardija	74	(11)
2015–2016	Tokushima Vortis	45	(4)
2016–2018	Shimizu S-Pulse	31	(2)
2019	V-Varen Nagasaki	13	(2)
2020	Wollongong United		
2021	Sydney Olympic	12	(2)
2022–	Nankatsu SC	4	(0)
- * Club domestic league appearances and goals as of 04:40, 14 October 2022 (UTC)

Yu Hasegawa (長谷川 悠, Hasegawa Yū; born 5 July 1987 in Masuho, Yamanashi) is a Japanese footballer who last played for Nankatsu SC.

== Club statistics ==
Updated to 1 March 2019.

Club performance			League		Cup		League Cup		Total	
Season	Club	League	Apps	Goals	Apps	Goals	Apps	Goals	Apps	Goals
Japan			League		Emperor's Cup		League Cup		Total	
2006	Kashiwa Reysol	J2 League	1	0	-		-		1	0
2006	FC Gifu	JRL (Tokai)	0	0	0	0	-		0	0
2007	Kashiwa Reysol	J1 League	0	0	-		0	0	0	0
2007	Avispa Fukuoka	J2 League	9	0	0	0	-		9	0
2008	Montedio Yamagata	J2 League	39	13	2	0	-		41	13
2009	Montedio Yamagata	J1 League	31	10	1	0	5	0	37	10
2010	Montedio Yamagata	J1 League	25	1	2	1	4	0	31	2
2011	Montedio Yamagata	J1 League	23	2	2	2	2	0	27	4
2012	Omiya Ardija	J1 League	30	5	3	1	5	1	38	7
2013	Omiya Ardija	J1 League	27	4	3	0	6	1	36	5
2014	Omiya Ardija	J1 League	17	2	4	2	6	0	27	4
2015	Tokushima Vortis	J2 League	36	3	4	3	-		40	6
2016	Tokushima Vortis	J2 League	9	1	-		-		9	1
2016	Shimizu S-Pulse	J2 League	6	0	3	1	-		9	1
2017	Shimizu S-Pulse	J1 League	16	2	3	3	3	0	22	5
2018	Shimizu S-Pulse	J1 League	9	0	1	0	4	2	14	2
Career total			278	43	28	13	35	4	341	62
