= Sekkyô =

Sekkyô may refer to:

- Sawa Sekkyō, a Japanese ukiyo-e artist
- Sekkyô, a collection of Japanese poetry by Dakotsu Iida
