= Kajikazawa, Yamanashi =

Dissolved municipality in Yamanashi prefecture, Japan

Coordinates: 35°33′N 138°28′E

Location of Kajikazawa in Yamanashi Prefecture

Kajikazawa (鰍沢町, Kajikazawa-chō) was a town located in Minamikoma District, Yamanashi Prefecture, Japan.

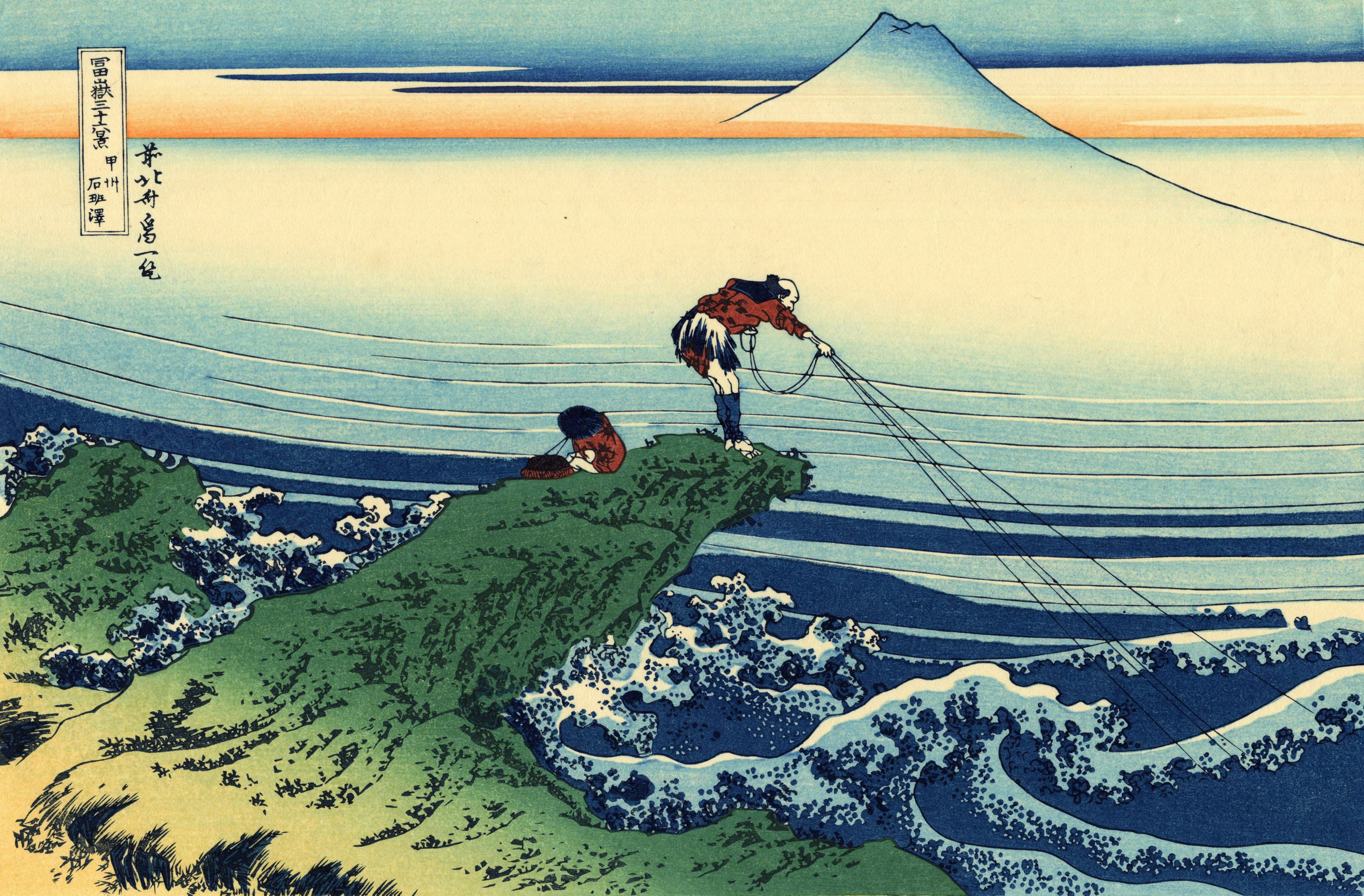
Kajikazawa in Kai Province from Hokusai's Thirty-six Views of Mount Fuji

As of 2003, the town had an estimated population of 4,402 and a density of 94.04 persons per km^{2}. The total area was 46.81 km^{2}.

On March 8, 2010, Kajikazawa, along with the town of Masuho (also from Minamikoma District), was merged to create the town of Fujikawa.
