= Julyan Cartwright =

Interdisciplinary physicist

- Born: Manchester, UK
- Citizenship: British
- Education: University of Newcastle upon Tyne, Queen Mary College, University of London
- Scientific career
- Fields: dynamical systems, nonlinear science, complexity, pattern formation
- Workplaces: CSIC (Spanish National Research Council)
- Doctoral advisor: David Arrowsmith
- Other academic advisors: Ian C. Percival, Keith Runcorn, David Tritton

Julyan Cartwright is an interdisciplinary physicist working in Granada, Spain at the Andalusian Earth Sciences Institute of the CSIC (Spanish National Research Council) and affiliated with the Carlos I Institute of Theoretical and Computational Physics at the University of Granada.

He is known for his research on how form and pattern emerge in nature, the dynamics of natural systems, across disciplinary boundaries, including his studies of the dynamics of passive scalars in chaotic advection of fluids, bailout embeddings, the Bogdanov map, the influence of fluid mechanics on the development of vertebrate left-right asymmetry, self-organization of biomineralization structures of mollusc shell including mother of pearl (nacre) and cuttlebone, excitable media, and chemobrionics: self-assembling porous precipitate structures, such as chemical gardens, brinicles, and submarine hydrothermal vents.

He is among the researchers in the Stanford list of the World's top 2% most cited scientists. He is chair of the international COST action Chemobionics and chair of the scientific advisory committee to the international conference Dynamics Days Europe. He is editor of the Cambridge University Press journal Elements in Dynamical Systems.

Press interest in his research has highlighted his work on chemical gardens, on pitch perception in the auditory system, on how symmetry is broken so that the heart is on the left, on how bees construct spiral bee combs, on the formation of nacre and pearls, on how brinicle ice tubes grow both on Earth and on Jupiter's moon, Europa, on the information content of complex self-assembled materials on the rogue wave nature of Hokusai's famous artwork the Great Wave off Kanagawa, on the Möbius strip before Möbius, on the possible melting of oceanic methane hydrate deposits owing to climate change, and on the origin of life at alkaline submarine hydrothermal vents and their relevance to astrobiology.
