= Kajikazawa in Kai Province =

Japanese woodblock print by Hokusai

- 甲州石班澤 (Japanese), Kōshū Kajikazawa (Japanese)
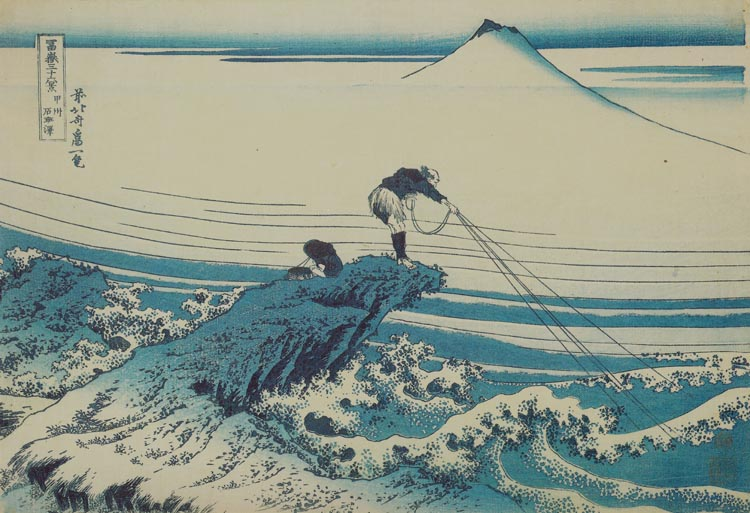
- Artist: Katsushika Hokusai
- Year: c. 1830–1832
- Type: Ukiyo-e woodblock print
- Dimensions: 25.72 cm × 38 cm (10.125 in × 15 in)

Kajikazawa in Kai Province (Japanese: 甲州石班澤, Hepburn: Kōshū Kajikazawa) is a woodblock print by the Japanese ukiyo-e artist Hokusai.

It was produced as one of the Thirty-six Views of Mount Fuji series which was published from c. 1830 to 1832 in the late Edo period. The image is considered one of the masterpieces of the series, particularly in its early blue impression (aizuri-e).

Standing precariously upon a rocky outcrop, a man casts his fishing lines tied to cormorants into the violent Fuji River at Kajikazawa. Man and nature appear fused into one: The picture is full of movement, his tensed body mimics the motion of the waves below, and this curved shape is reflected in the rock on which he stands. The triangular shape made by the fishing lines also echoes that of Mount Fuji which is seen rising above.

The first impression employs the aizuri technique while later versions add different colours. The fisherman and son gain a red jacket, while the rocks are coloured with a gradated (bokashi) green-to-yellow wash. Some impressions add a streak of pink to the sky.

Later impressions

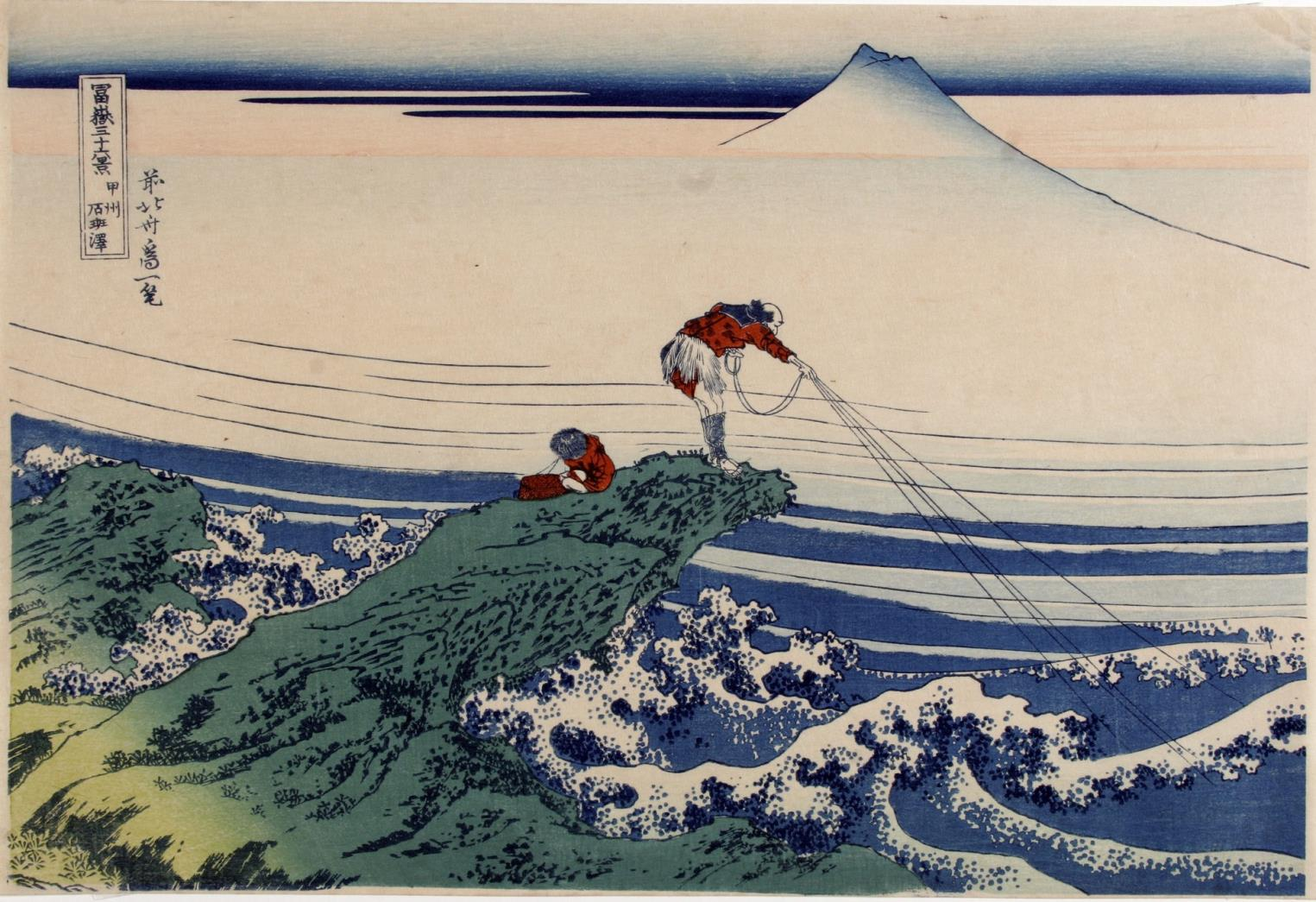

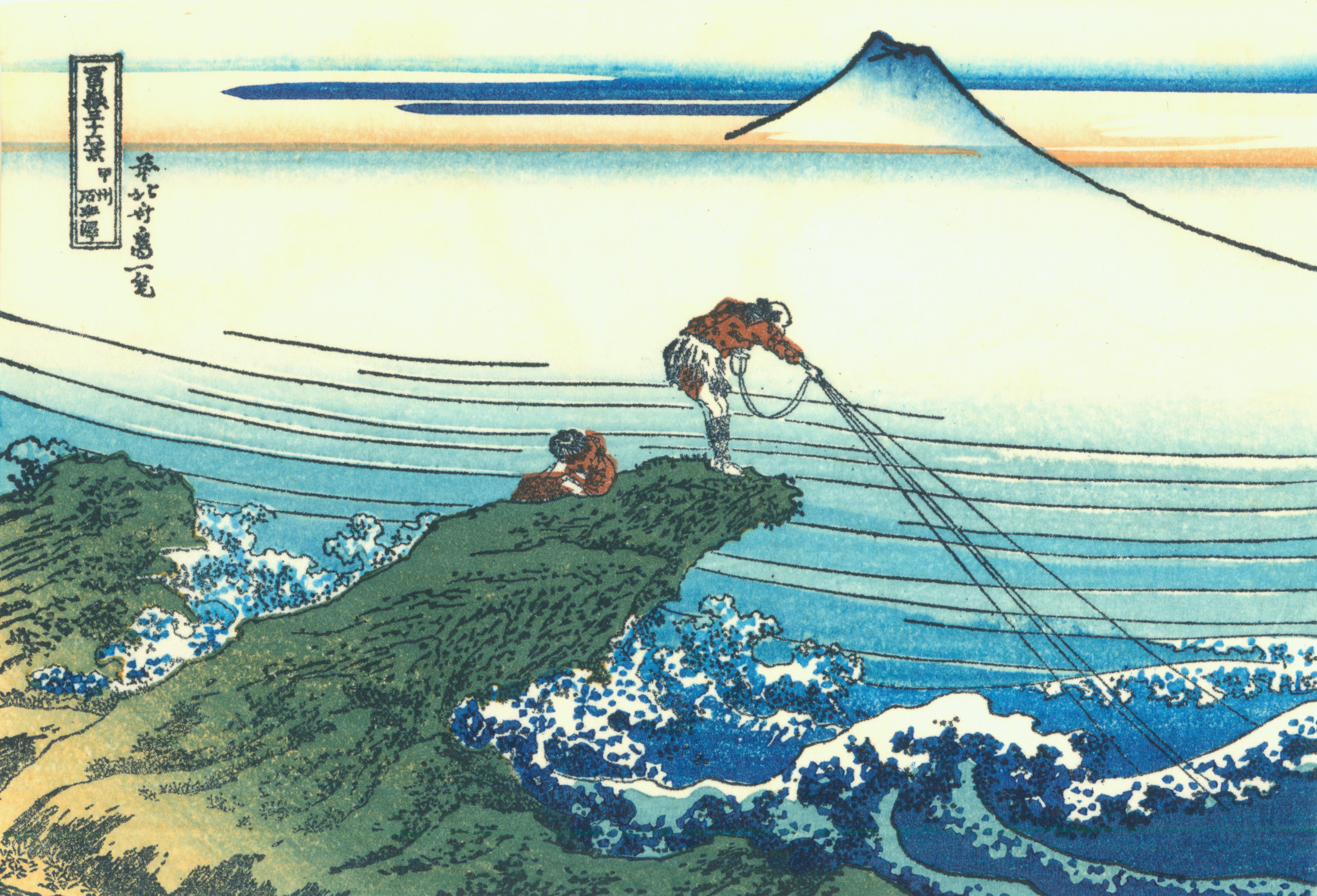

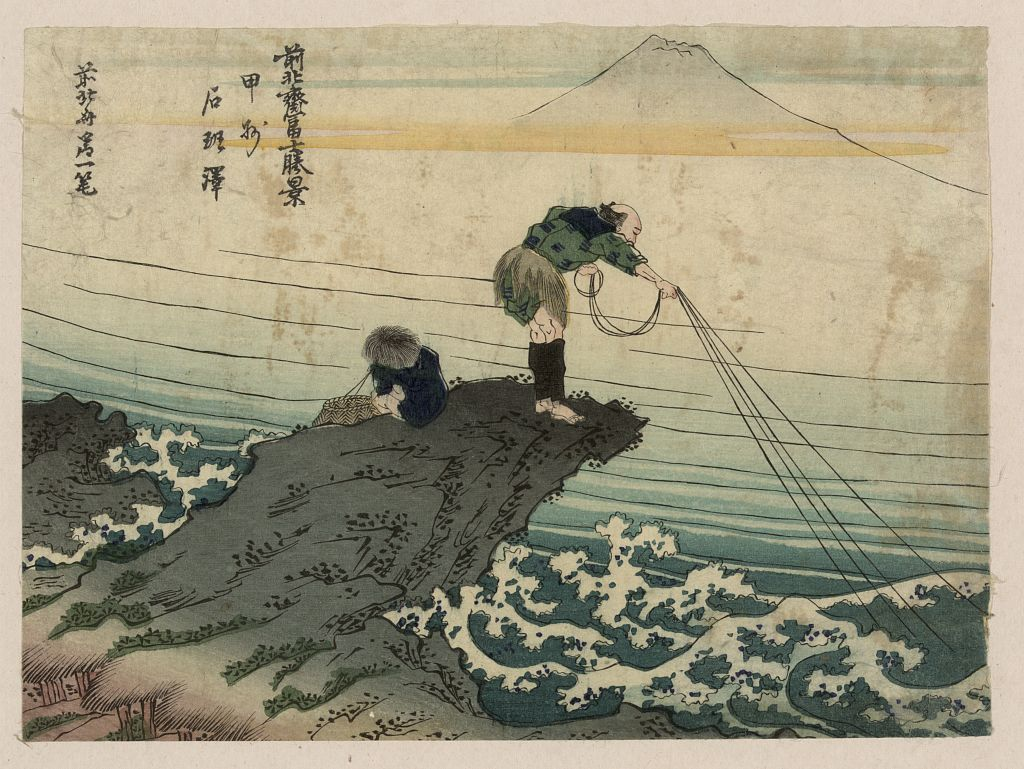
