= Edoardo Chiossone Museum of Oriental Art =

Asian art museum in Genoa, Italy

Coordinates: 44°24′39″N 8°56′14″E

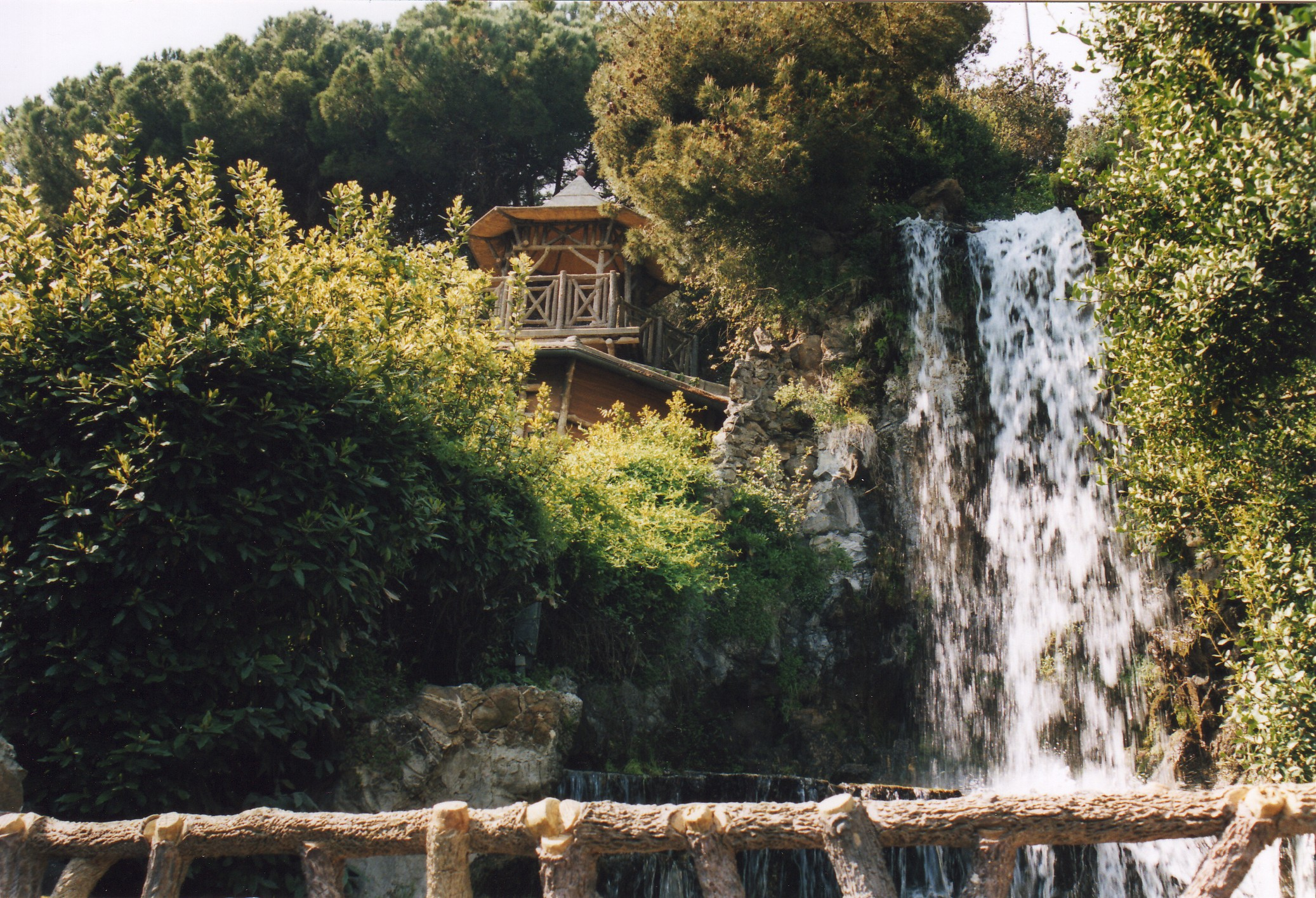
The park of Villetta Di Negro, site of the museum

The Edoardo Chiossone Museum of Oriental Art in Genoa, Italy is an important collection of Asian art, one of the most significant collections in Europe and in Italy, along with the museums of Venice and Rome.

The museum hosts the huge collection (over 15,000 pieces) of Edoardo Chiossone, who spent 23 years (1875-1898) in Japan.

The exhibition shows many objects and artworks from Japan and China, like sculptures, porcelain pieces, bronze vessels, prints, masks, Samurai armors and helmets.

It is situated inside Villetta Di Negro, a public park in the centre of Genoa, next to Piazza Corvetto and overlooking the historical centre and Via Garibaldi.

Interiors of the museum photographed by Paolo Monti (1967)

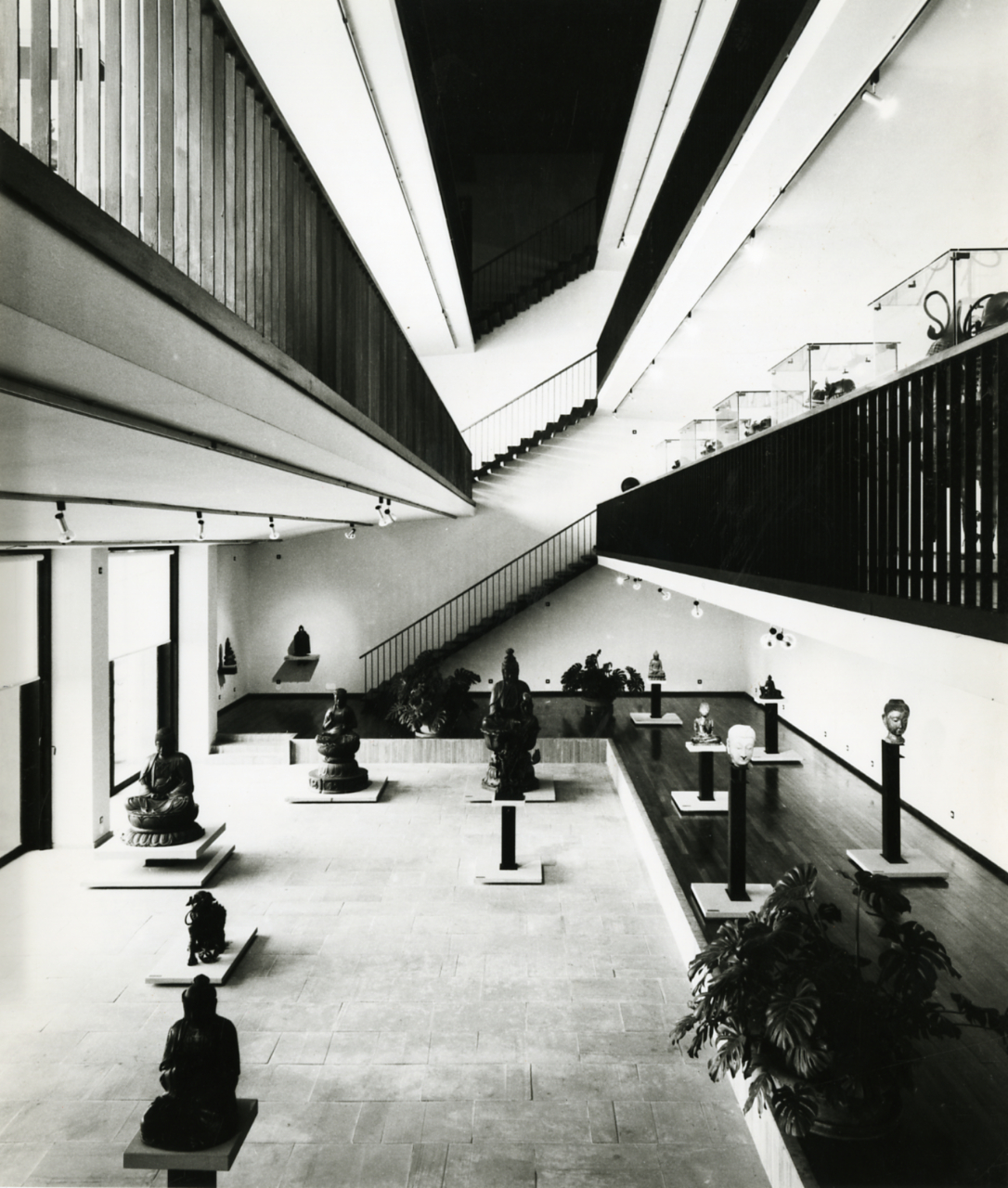

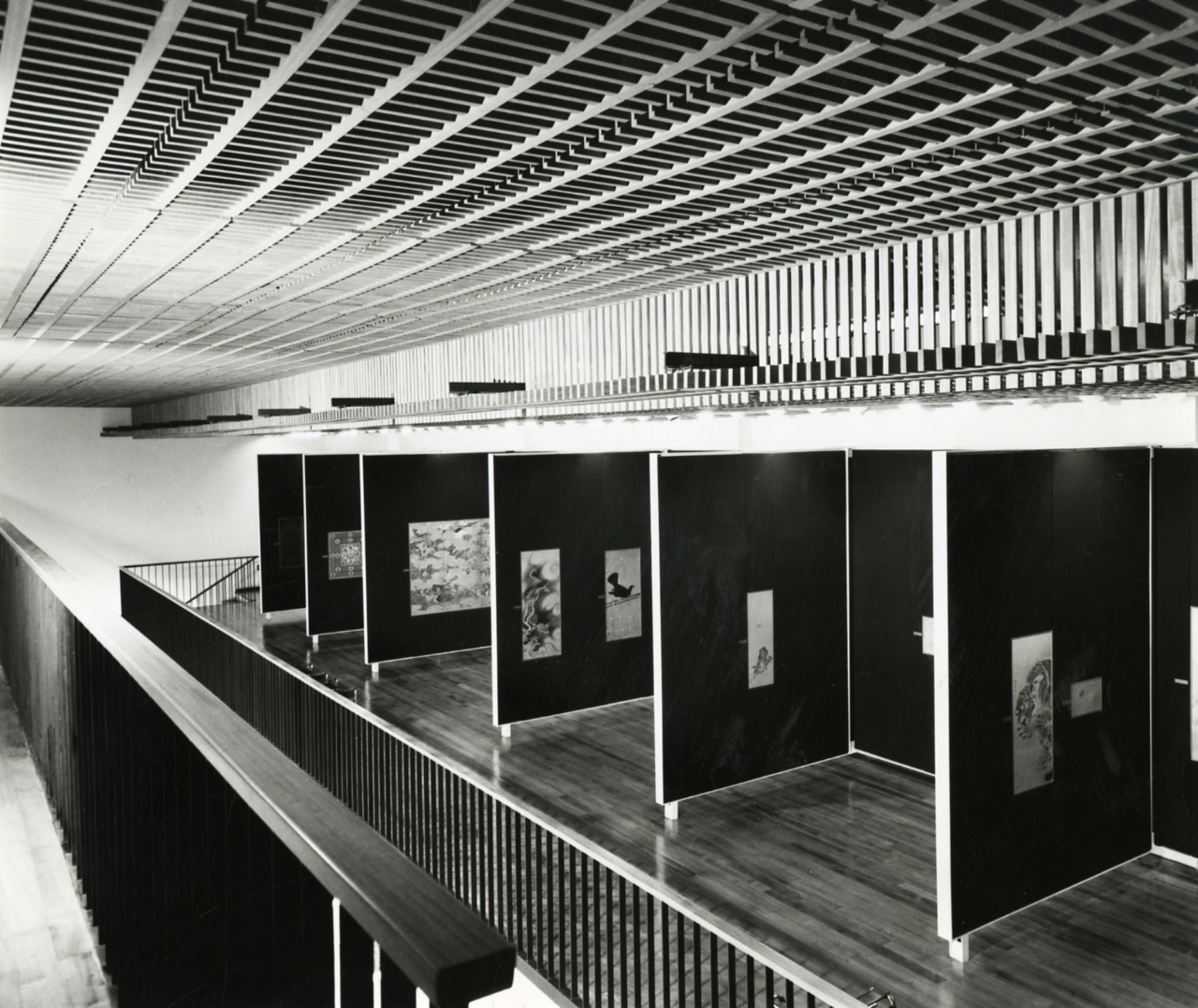

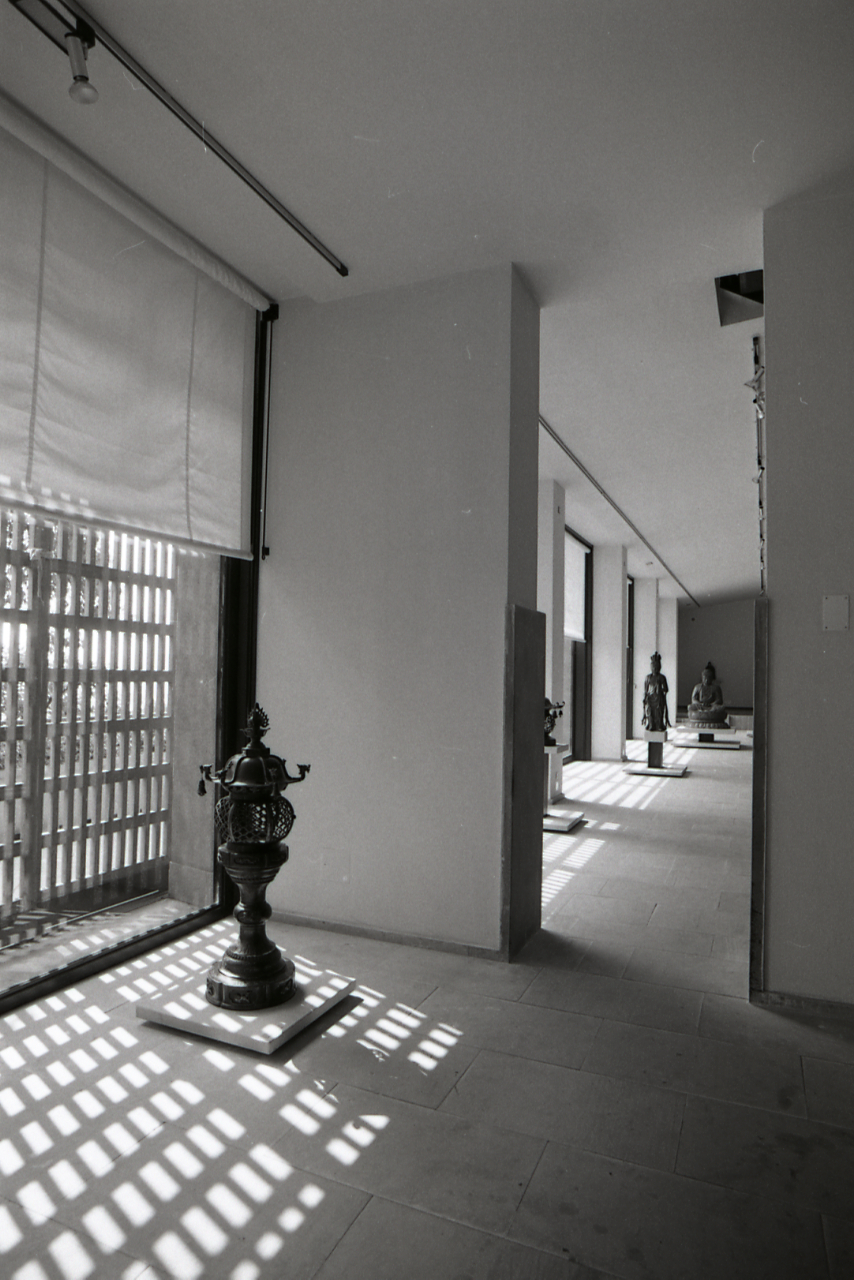
