= Masuho, Yamanashi =

Dissolved municipality in Yamanashi prefecture, Japan

Coordinates: 35°34′N 138°28′E

Location of Masuho in Yamanashi Prefecture

Masuho (増穂町, Masuho-chō) was a town located in Minamikoma District, Yamanashi Prefecture, Japan.

As of 2003, the town had an estimated population of 13,083 and a density of 200.75 persons per km^{2}. The total area was 65.17 km^{2}.

On March 8, 2010, Masuho, along with the town of Kajikazawa (also from Minamikoma District), was merged to create the town of Fujikawa.
