= Sawa Sekkyō =

Japanese woodblock print designer

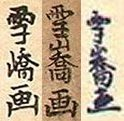
Examples of Sawa Sekkyō's signature, both reading "Sekkyō ga"

Sawa Sekkyō (沢 雪嶠) was a designer of ukiyo-e Japanese woodblock prints in the late 18th and early 19th centuries. He was originally a pupil of Tsutsumi Tōrin a painter of the Kanō school, but left the school and became an independent ukiyo-e artist. Sekkyō is best known for his landscapes and bird-and-animal studies, the latter often printed entirely in black or blue ink (aizuri-e).

== Gallery ==
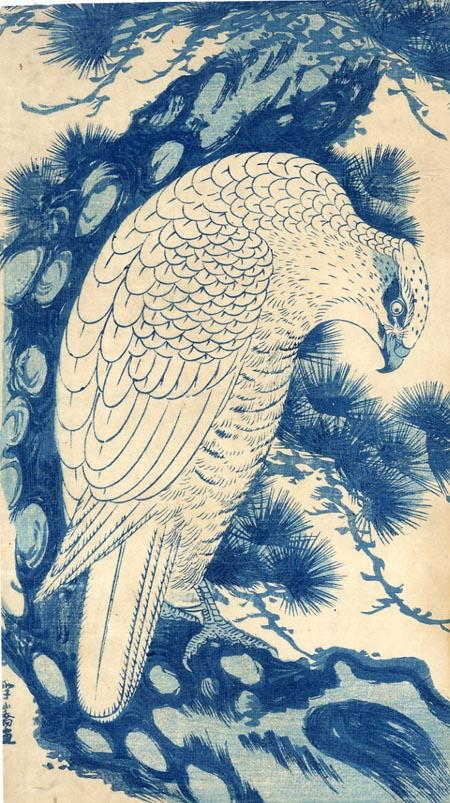
White Falcon in a pine tree. Woodblock print, 13.5 x 7.75 in.
