= Bokashi (printing) =

Technique in Japanese woodblock printing

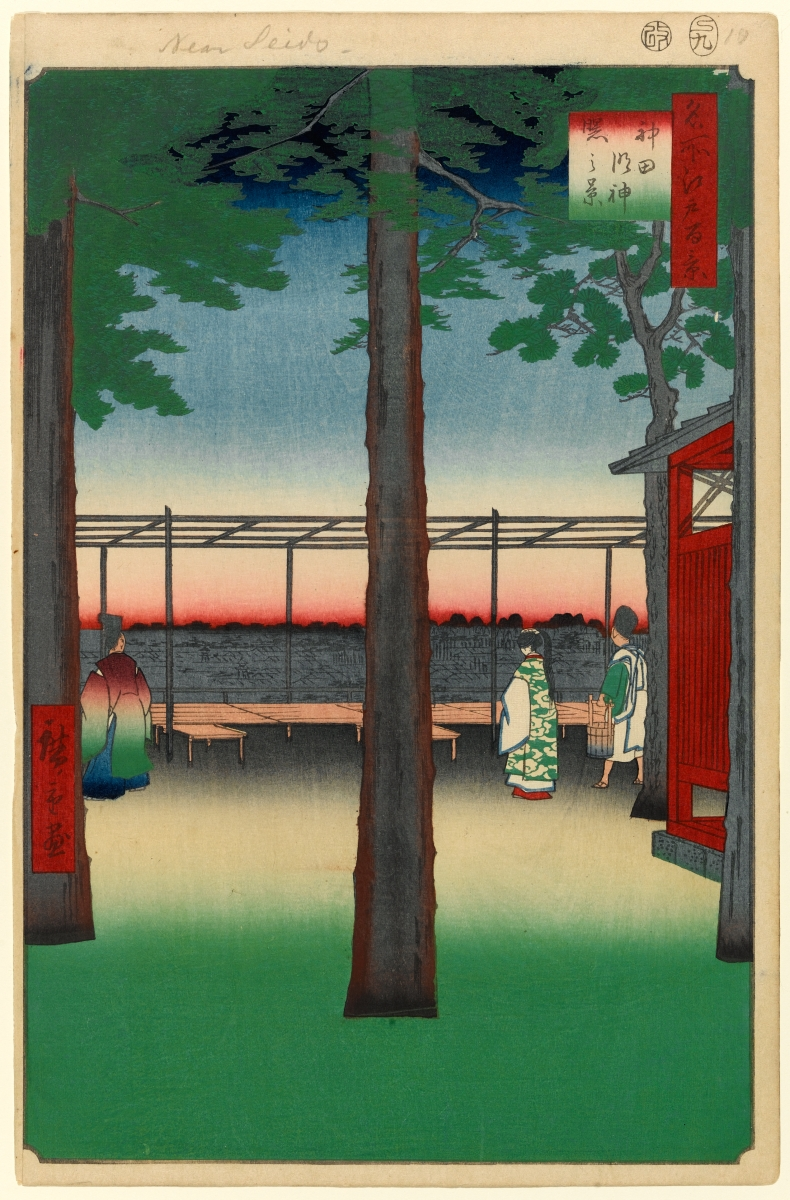
In this print by Hiroshige, bokashi is used in the foreground, at the horizon, in the sky, on the priest's robes, and in the square cartouche

Bokashi (Japanese: ぼかし) is a technique used in Japanese woodblock printmaking. It achieves a variation in lightness and darkness (value) of a single color or multiple colors by hand applying a gradation of ink to a moistened wooden printing block, rather than inking the block uniformly. This hand-application had to be repeated for each sheet of paper that was printed.

The best-known examples of bokashi are in the 19th-century ukiyo-e works of Hokusai and Hiroshige, in which the fading of Prussian blue dyes in skies and water create an illusion of depth. In later works by Hiroshige, for example the series One Hundred Famous Views of Edo, most prints originally featured bokashi such as red-to-yellow-to-blue color sunrises.

== Techniques ==
Gradations can be created on the blocks themselves using the itobokashi technique, or brushed on by hand using fukibokashi. They can also be done freehand directly onto a print, without using a printing block.

=== Fukibokashi ===
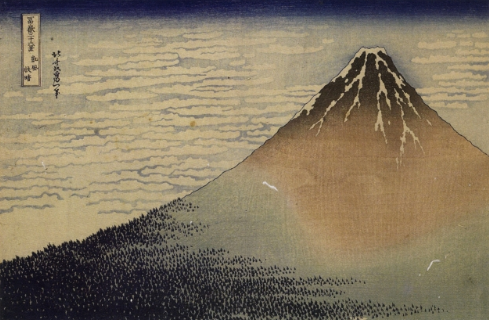
The blue skyline at the top is typical ichimonji bokashi. The darkened peak is an example of hakkake bokashi. Fine Wind, Clear Morning, Hokusai, c. 1830

Fukibokashi requires gradations of ink to be applied to the printing block. This is not a precise technique; its results are inconsistent from print to print.

The technique ichimonji bokashi (一文字ぼかし, "straight-line bokashi") is the one associated with the works of Hokusai and Hiroshige to represent the horizon, sea, or sky. Ink is applied to one end of the brush (kata-bake) which is drawn across the desired portion of the printing block; this area is first wetted with a zōkin cloth, so that the ink bleeds somewhat across the wet area. This creates a gradation at the width of the brush. Straight line gradation with an uneven edge is known as ichimoji-mura-bokashi.

In futa-iro bokashi (二色ぼかし) two colours are worked toward each other, achieved by applying two inks to opposite edges of the brush. In hakkake bokashi a flat colour is printed, and then the same printing block is washed and re-brushed with a bokashi effect to overprint over the first; this technique is seen on the dark peak of Mount Fuji in Hokusai's Fine Wind, Clear Morning.

O-bokashi (wide gradation). A difficult skill. To achieve gradation of a large area, the standard ichimonji technique is repeated multiple times using different brushes, narrowing the space to be shaded each time.

Ate-nashi-bokashi (gradation without definition) is used for soft modulations of color, such as rosy cheeks.

=== Itabokashi ===
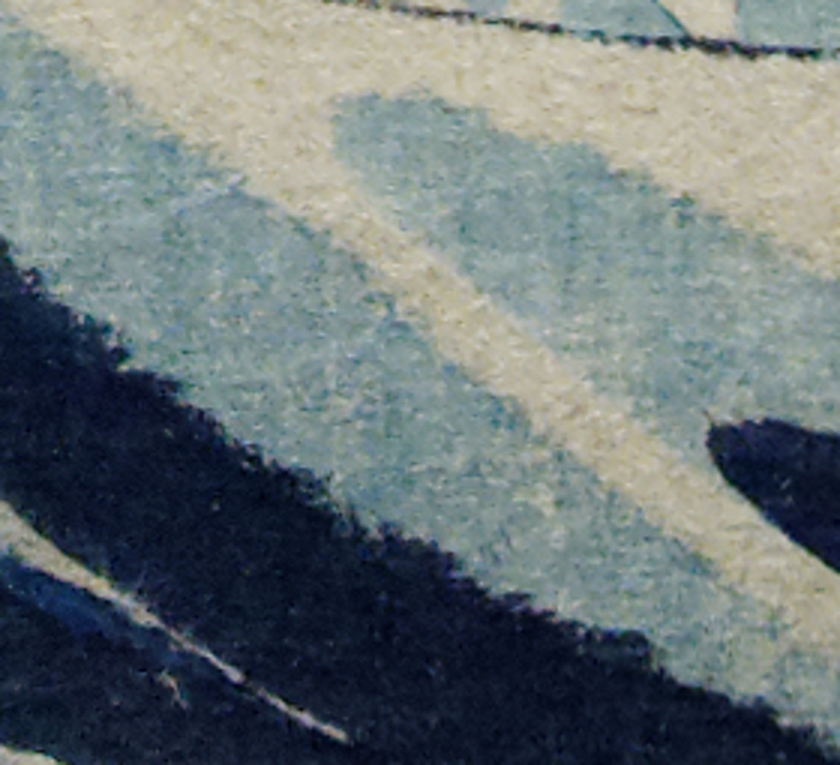
Close-up of Hokusai's The Great Wave off Kanagawa showing itabokashi shading technique

Itabokashi, or 'block shading,' is a technique used to produce ruffled edges on areas of color. It is produced by first cutting an area slightly larger than needed for a color, then abrading the edges of that area to make the transition from that color less sharp. This is commonly used in clouds and shading.

=== Freehand techniques ===
Some techniques are performed freehand, without using a printing block, and results can vary considerably from print to print. Kumadori bokashi is used for finer details, such as around eyes, and requires the artist to draw with a brush loaded with ink on a wetted area; as with ichimonji bokashi, the bleeding of the ink into the water creates gradations. Atenashi bokashi is similar, requiring the wetting of areas to be inked, and is used for details such as clouds.
