= List of mergers in Yamanashi Prefecture =

Here is a list of mergers in Yamanashi Prefecture, Japan since the Heisei era.

== Mergers from April 1, 1999 to Present ==
- On March 1, 2003 - the towns of Tomizawa (from Minamikoma District) was merged into the expanded town of Nanbu.
- On April 1, 2003 - the towns of Kōsai, Kushigata, Shirane and Wakakusa, and the villages of Ashiyasu and Hatta (all from Nakakoma District) were merged to create the city of Minami-Alps.
- On November 15, 2003 - the town of Kawaguchiko, and the villages of Ashiwada and Katsuyama (all from Minamitsuru District) were merged to create the town of Fujikawaguchiko.
- On September 1, 2004 - the town of Futaba (from Kitakoma District), and the towns of Ryūō and Shikishima (both from Nakakoma District) were merged to create the city of Kai.
- On September 13, 2004 - the old town of Minobu absorbed with the town of Nakatomi (both from Minamikoma District), and the town of Shimobe (from Nishiyatsushiro District) to create the new and expanded town of Minobu (in Minamikoma District).
- On October 12, 2004 - the towns of Ichinomiya, Isawa, Misaka and Yatsushiro, the village of Sakaigawa (all from Higashiyatsushiro District), and the town of Kasugai (from Higashiyamanashi District) were merged to create the city of Fuefuki.
- On November 1, 2004 - the towns of Hakushū, Nagasaka, Sutama and Takane, and the village of Akeno, Mukawa and Ōizumi (all from Kitakoma District) were merged to create the city of Hokuto.
- On February 13, 2005 - the town of Uenohara (from Kitatsuru District) absorbed the village of Akiyama (from Minamitsuru District) to create the city of Uenohara.
- On March 22, 2005 - the town of Makioka, and the village of Mitomi (both from Higashiyamanashi District) were merged into the expanded city of Yamanashi.
- On October 1, 2005 - the towns of Ichikawadaimon, Mitama and Rokugō (all from Nishiyatsushiro District) were merged to create the town of Ichikawamisato.
- On November 1, 2005 - the city of Enzan was merged with the town of Katsunuma and the village of Yamato (both from Higashiyamanashi District) to create the city of Kōshū. Higashiyamanashi District was dissolved as a result of this merger.
- On February 20, 2006 - the towns of Tamaho and Tatomi (both from Nakakoma District), and the village of Toyotomi (from Higashiyatsushiro District) were merged to create the city of Chūō.
- On March 1, 2006:
  - The northern part of the town of Kamikuishiki (the localities of Furuseki and Kakehashi) (from Nishiyatsushiro District), and the town of Nakamichi (from Higashiyatsushiro District) were merged into the expanded city of Kōfu.
  - The southern part of Kamikuishiki (the localities of Fujigane, Motosu and Shoji) (from Nishiyatsushiro District) was merged into the expanded town of Fujikawaguchiko (in Minamitsuru District).
- On March 15, 2006 - the town of Kobuchisawa (from Kitakoma District) was merged into the expanded city of Hokuto. Kitakoma District was dissolved as a result of this merger.
- On August 1, 2006 - the village of Ashigawa (from Higashiyatsushiro District) was merged into the expanded city of Fuefuki. Higashiyatsushiro District was dissolved as a result of this merger.
- On March 8, 2010 - the towns of Kajikazawa and Masuho (both from Minamikoma District) were merged to create the town of Fujikawa.
