= Oka Chōshizuka Kofun =

Kofun period keyhole-shaped burial mound in Yamanashi, Japan

Coordinates: 35°36′4.8″N 138°38′40.0″E

- 岡・銚子塚古墳 (Japanese)
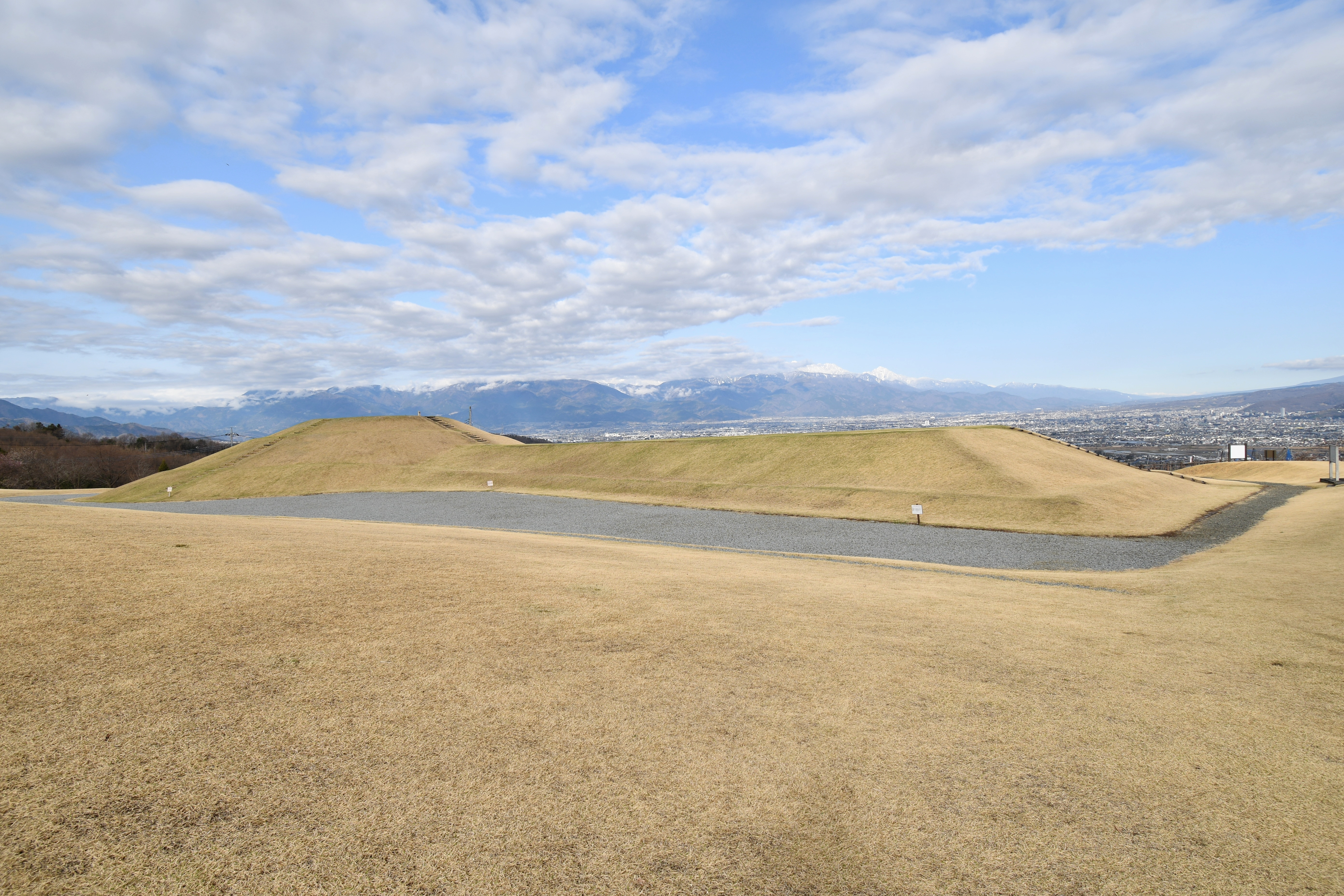
- Oka Chōshizuka Kofun

- Oka Chōshizuka Kofun Oka Chōshizuka Kofun (Japan)
- Type: Kofun
- Periods: Kofun period
- Location: 2223-1 Oka, Yashiro-cho,, Fuefuki, Yamanashi, Japan
- Region: Tōkai region

History
- Built: late 4th century

Site notes
- Public access: Yes (park)
- Yamanashi Prefecture Historic Site

The Oka Chōshizuka Kofun (岡・銚子塚古墳) is a Kofun period (late 4th century) keyhole-shaped burial mound, located in the Yashiro-cho Oka neighborhood of Fuefuki, Yamanashi in the Tōkai region of Japan. The tumulus was designated a Yamanashi Prefecture Historic Site in 1988. It is located with the Yashiro Furusato Park. The name "Oka" is added to distinguish it from many other kofun around the country named "Chōshizuka", especially the Kai Chōshizuka Kofun in Kōfu, which is a National Historic Site,

== Overview ==
The Oka Chōshizuka Kofun is located at the eastern end of the Sone Hills on the southeastern edge of the Kofu Basin. Situated on the left bank of the Fuefuki River, the area is densely populated with large burial mounds. At an elevation of 425 meters, it offers a panoramic view of the basin. It has an overall length of 92 meters, orientated east-west. The posterior circular portion has a diameter of 48 meters and height of 7.5 meters. The anterior rectangular section has a width of 41 meters and a height of four meters. The base was created by excavating the slope. The front section is constructed in two tiers, with a protruding, sword-tip-like front. The posterior circular section is constructed in three tiers, with fukiishi revetment stones applied to the constricted area on the south side of the mound and near the base of the front section. A clay burial chamber has also been confirmed. A single moat surrounds the mound. The main burial chamber is located in the center of the posterior circular section, perpendicular to the main axis, but both the front and rear sections have suffered significant damage from cultivation.

In 1992, an archaeological excavation was conducted as part of park development. According to the late Edo period record "Kai no Kuni Shi," (History of Kai Province, excavations were conducted during the Hōreki era (1751-1764), yielding grave goods such as shinju-kyo bronze mirrors, iron swords, iron arrowheads, axes, and magatama beads. The "Kai Meishō Shi" by Hagiwara Motokatsu, a literary figure from Kai Province, contains rubbings of a dragon-shaped mirror and a mirror with two gods and two beasts, suggesting the possibility that these are triangular-rimmed mirrors with divine beast motifs. Although the whereabouts of these artifacts is now unknown,, fragments of early cylindrical haniwa of a unique lineage, including some of the oldest in the prefecture, as well as fragments of pot-shaped and unusually shaped haniwa, have been identified.

The Oka-Chōshizuka Kofun is estimated to have been constructed slightly later than the Kai-Chōshizuka Kofun. Similarities have been pointed out between the two in terms of mound shape, grave goods, and haniwa style.

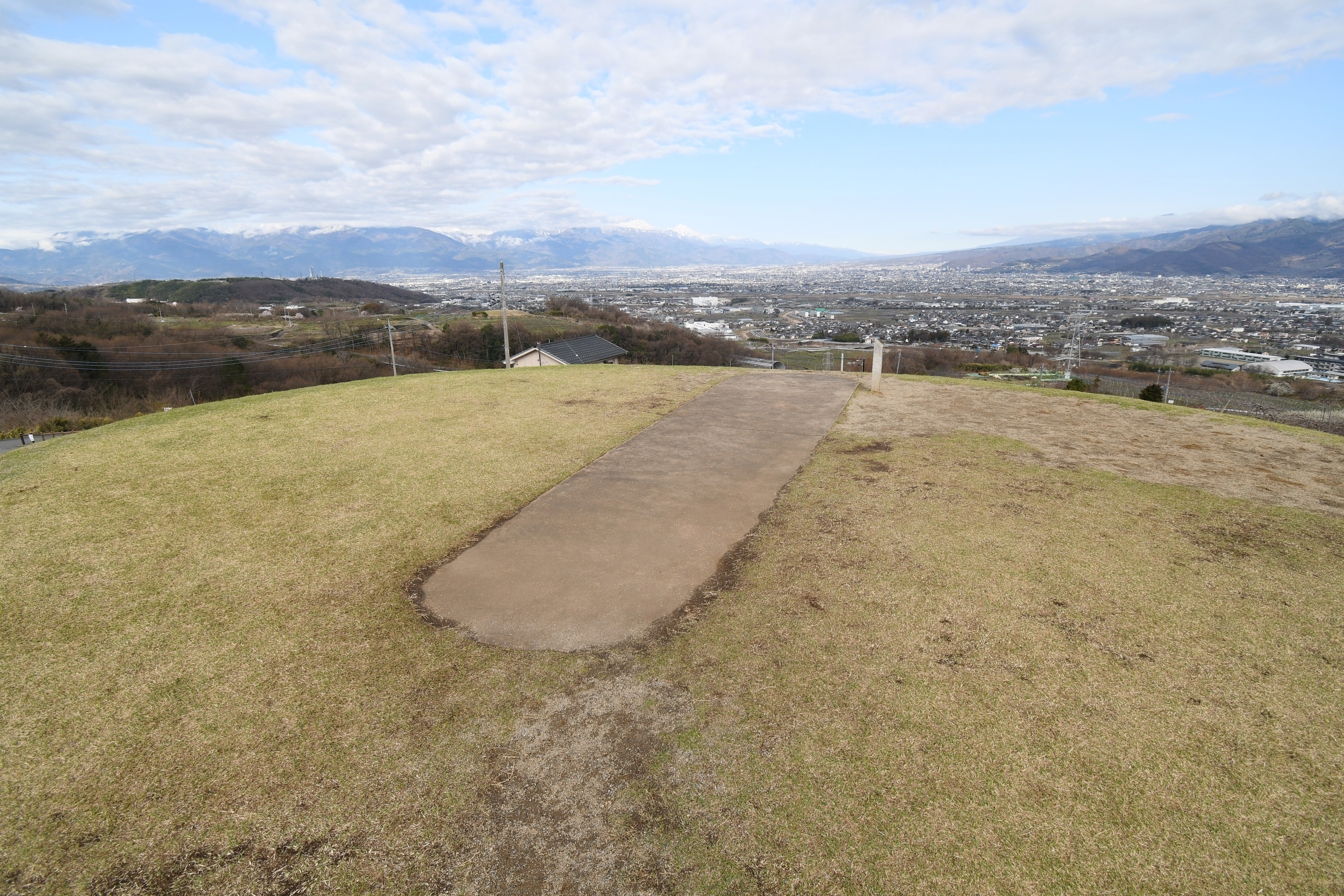
The summit of the rear circular section. The Kofu Basin is visible in the background.

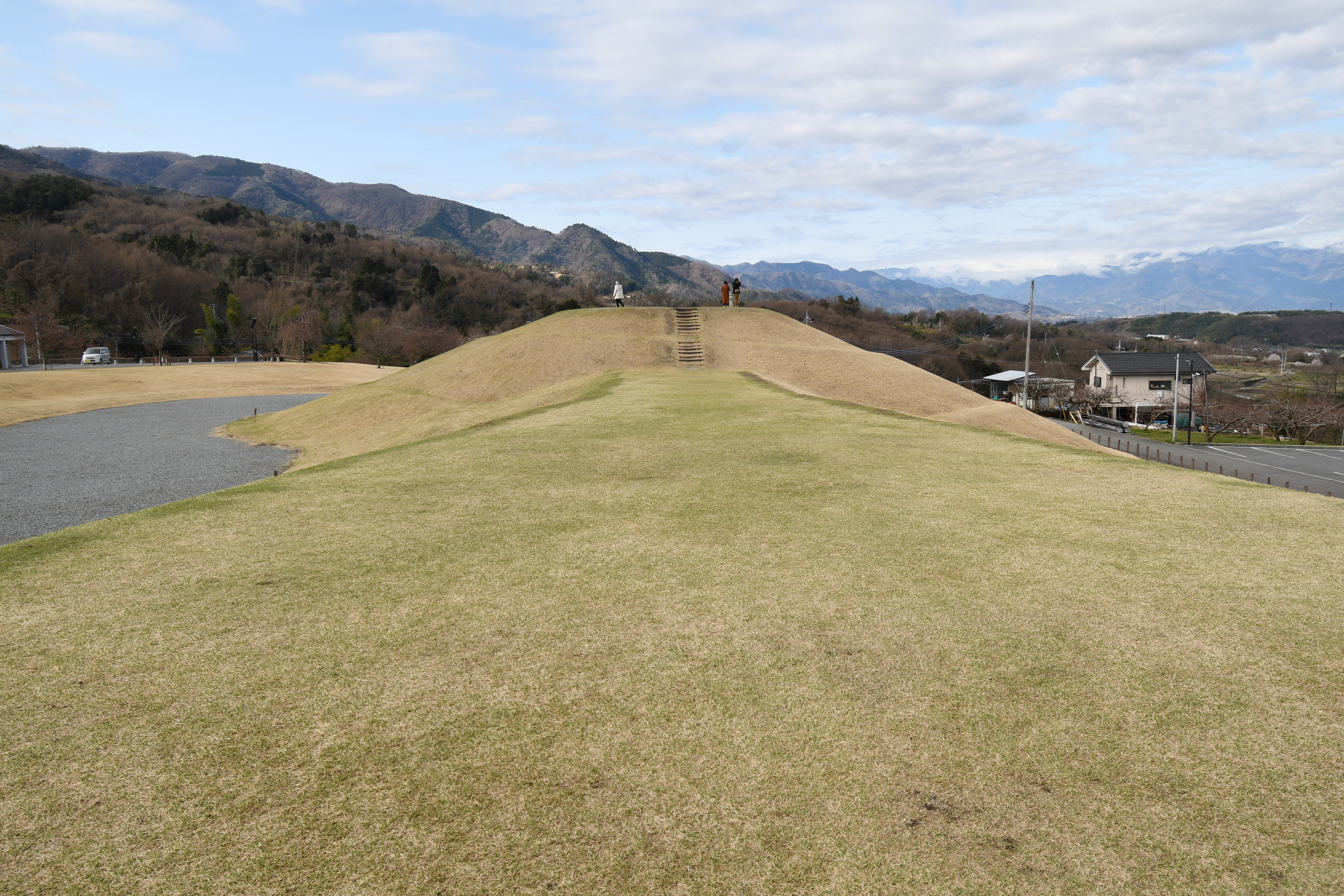
View of the rear circular section from the front section

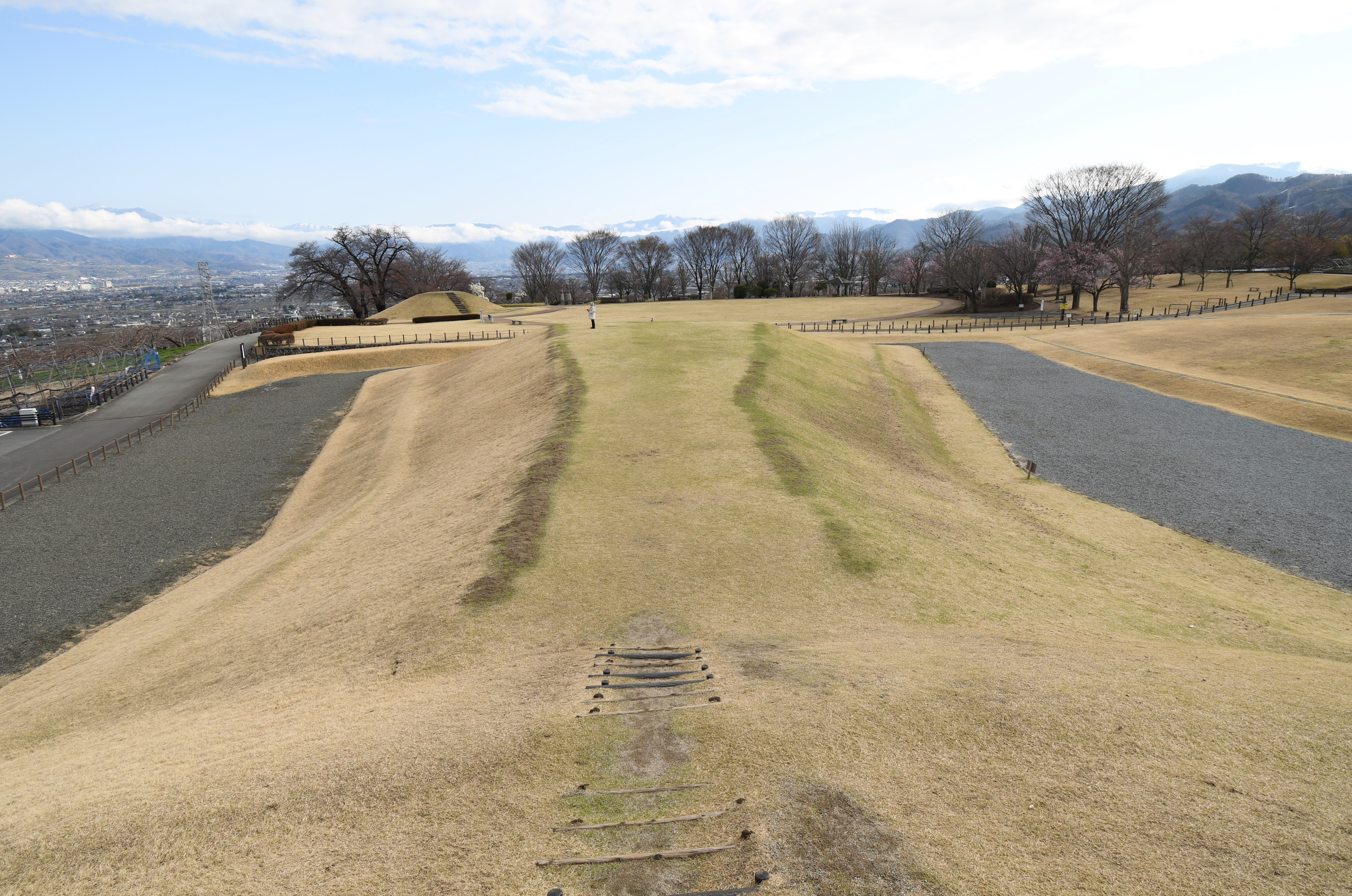
View of the rectangular front section from the rear circular section

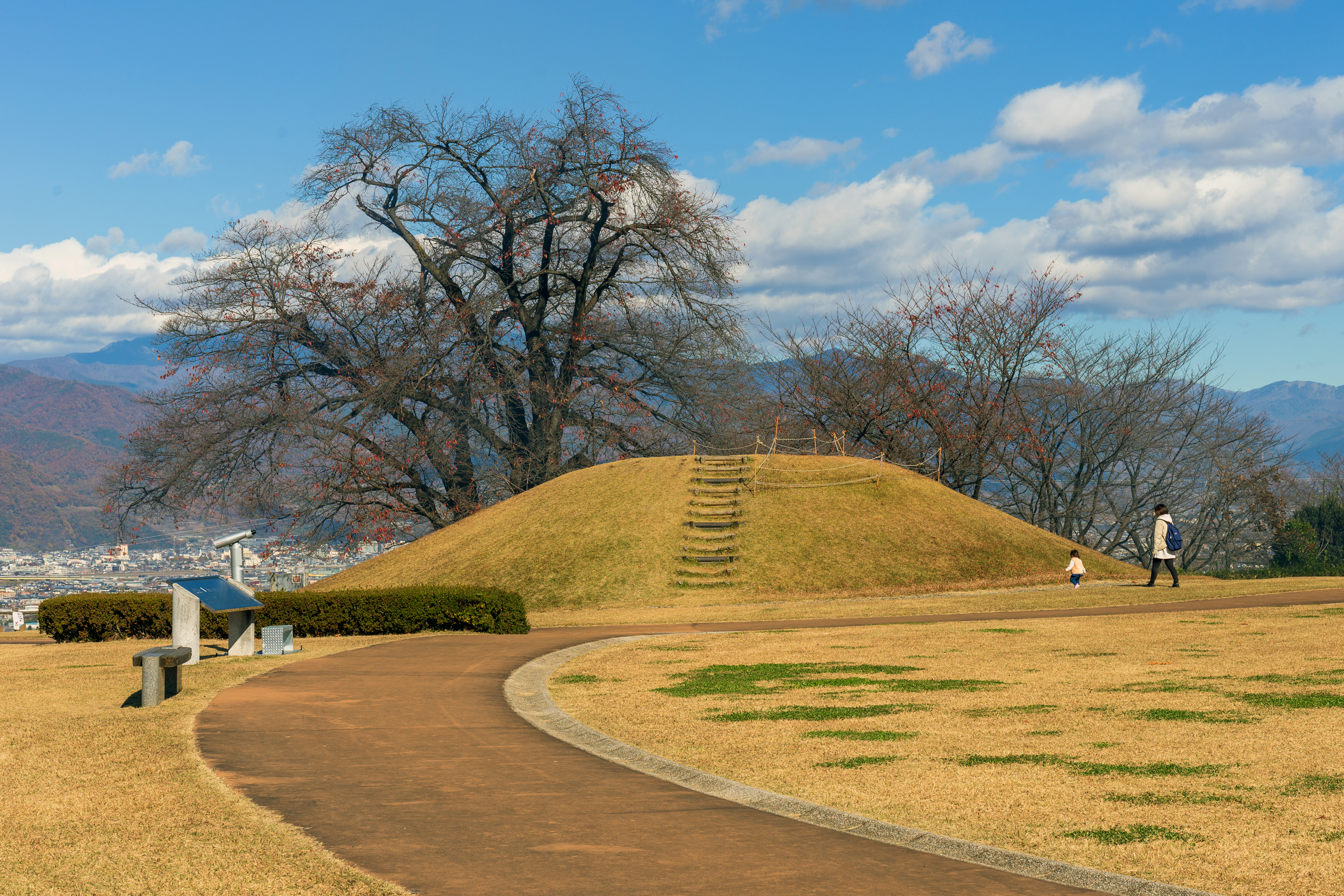
The nearby Sakazukizuka Kofun (burial mound)

== See also ==
- List of Historic Sites of Japan (Yamanashi)
