= Fujikawa, Yamanashi =

Fujikawa 富士川町
- Town
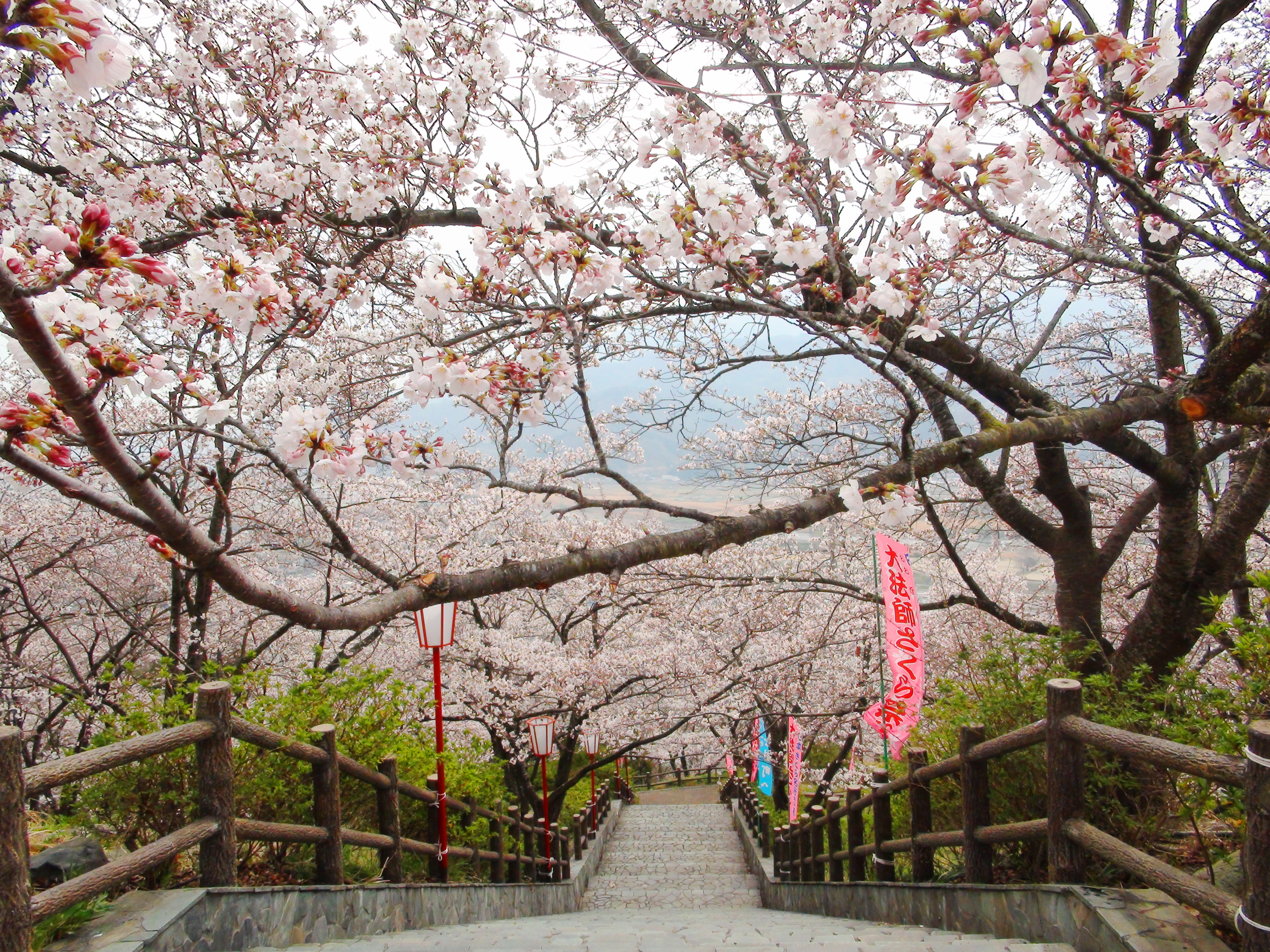
- Oboshi Park in Fujikawa Town

- Flag Seal

- Location of Fujikawa in Yamanashi Prefecture

- Coordinates: 35°33′40″N 138°27′41″E
- Country: Japan
- Region: Chūbu; Tōkai
- Prefecture: Yamanashi Prefecture
- District: Minamikoma
- Kajikazawa town settled: August 1, 1896
- Masuho town settled: April 3, 1951
- Two towns merged: March 8, 2010

Government
  - Mayor: Toshiki Mochizuki (望月利樹) － from January 2022

Area
  - Total: 111.98 km^{2} (43.24 sq mi)

Population (June 1, 2019)
  - Total: 15,125
  - Density: 135.07/km^{2} (349.83/sq mi)
- Time zone: UTC+9 (Japan Standard Time)
- Phone number: 0556-22-1111
- Address: 1134 Tenjinnakajo Fujkawa-cho Minimikoma-gun, Yamanashi-ken 400-0592
- Website: Official website

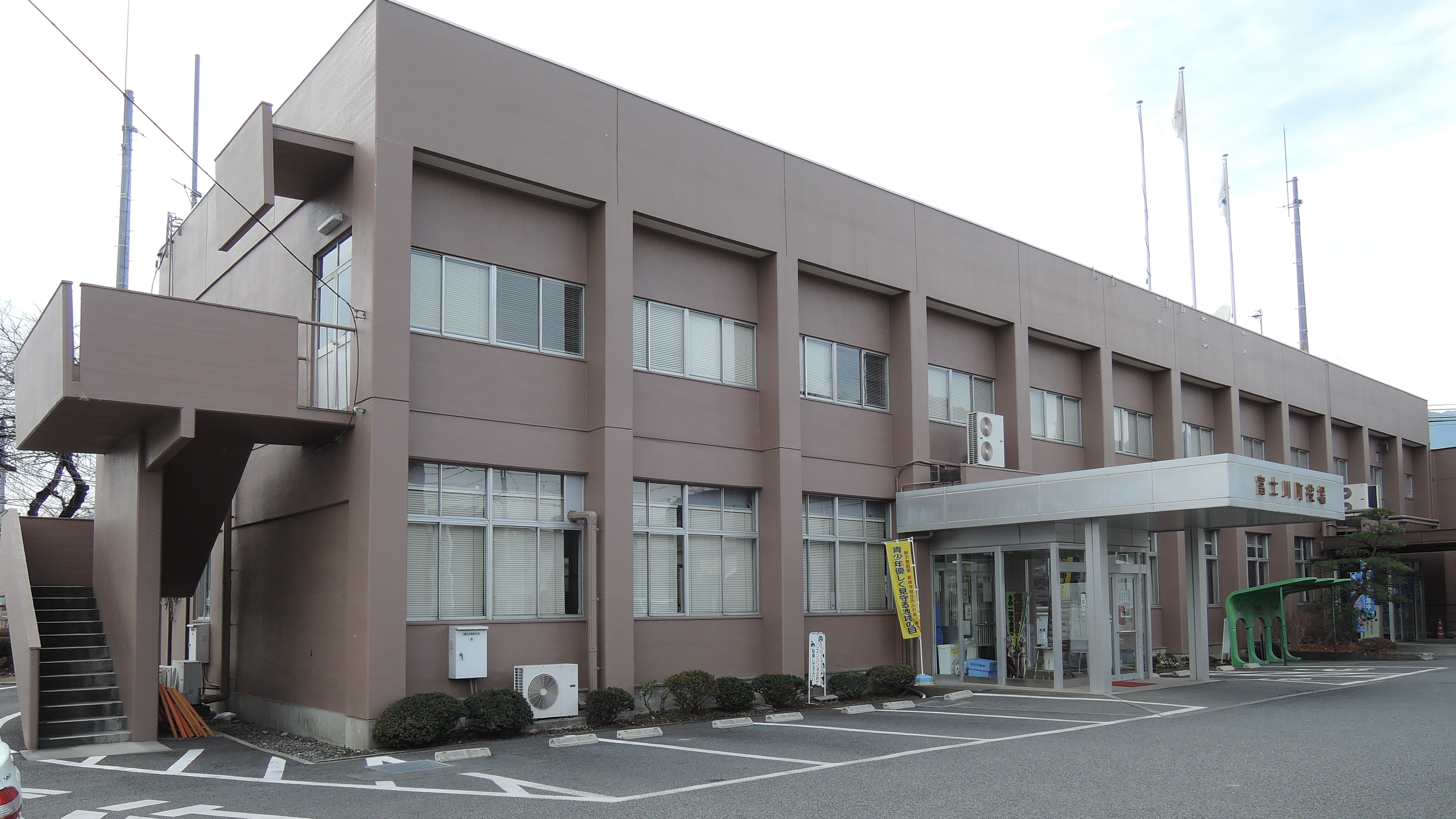
Fujikawa Town Hall

Fujikawa (富士川町, Fujikawa-chō) is a town located in Yamanashi Prefecture, Japan. As of 1 June 2019, the town had an estimated population of 15,125 in 6323 households, and a population density of 140 persons per km^{2}. The total area of the town is 111.98 square kilometres (43.24 sq mi). .

== Geography ==
Fujikawa is located in the southwestern part of Yamanashi Prefecture, bordered by the 2000-meter Kushigatayama to the west and the Fuji River to the east. In terms of land use, 81% of the town area is forested.

=== Neighboring municipalities ===
Yamanashi Prefecture

- Hayakawa
- Ichikawamisato
- Minami-Alps
- Minobu

=== Climate ===
The town has a climate characterized by hot and humid summers, and relatively mild winters (Köppen climate classification Cfa). The average annual temperature in Fujikawa is 13.7 °C. The average annual rainfall is 1415 mm with September as the wettest month. The temperatures are highest on average in August, at around 25.9 °C, and lowest in January, at around 2.0 °C.

== Demographics ==
Per Japanese census data, the population of Fujikawa has declined by roughly one-third over the past 60 years.

Historical population
Year	Pop.	±%
1960	21,558	—
1970	19,864	−7.9%
1980	18,815	−5.3%
1990	18,170	−3.4%
2000	17,544	−3.4%
2010	16,307	−7.1%
2020	14,219	−12.8%

== History ==
During the Edo period, all of Kai Province was tenryō territory under direct control of the Tokugawa shogunate. During the cadastral reform of the early Meiji period on April 1, 1889, Minamikoma District within Yamanashi Prefecture was created and organized into 22 villages. Kajikazawa village was raised to town status on August 1, 1898, and Masuho on April 3, 1951.

In 2003, a proposal was raised to merge the towns of Masuho and Kajikazawa with the towns of Ichikawadaimon, Mitama and Rokugō from Nishiyatsushiro District into a new city, or to merge with neighboring Minami-Alps. The proposal was not successful, and instead the three towns in Nishiyatsushiro merged to form Ichikawamisato on October 1, 2005, whereas Masuho and Kajikazawa merged to form Fujikawa on March 8, 2010.

== Economy ==
The economy of Fujikawa is primarily based on forestry and agriculture.

== Education ==
Fujikawa has three public elementary schools and two public junior high schools operated by the town government. The town does not have a high school.

== Transportation ==
=== Railway ===
The town has no passenger rail service. The nearest train stations are Kajikazawaguchi Station or Ichikawa-Daimon Station in Ichikawamisato, Yamanashi.

=== Highway ===
- Chūbu-Ōdan Expressway
- National Route 52
- National Route 140

== Notable people from Fujikawa ==
- Masaki Fukai – professional football player
- Yu Hasegawa – professional football player
- Yoshifumi Kashiwa – professional football player
- Kunio Yonenaga – shogi master
