= Ashigawa, Yamanashi =

Dissolved municipality in Yamanashi prefecture, Japan

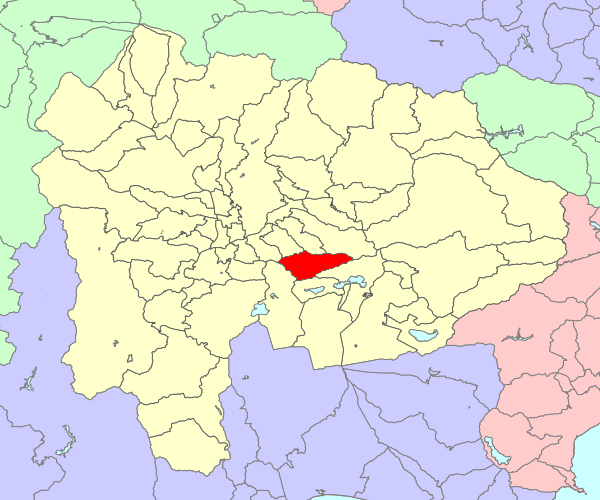
Map of former Ashigawa village

Ashigawa (芦川村, Ashigawa-mura) was a village located in Higashiyatsushiro District, Yamanashi Prefecture, Japan.

As of 2003, the village had an estimated population of 555 and a population density of 14.94 persons per km^{2}. The total area was 37.15 km^{2}.

On August 1, 2006, Ashigawa was merged into the expanded city of Fuefuki. Higashiyatsushiro District was dissolved as a result of this merger.

== Geography ==
The village was located at the southern end of Higashiyatsushiro District.

After the village of Ashiyasu merged with five towns and villages to form the city of Minami-Alps on April 1, 2003, the village become the least populous municipality in Yamanashi Prefecture. Also, after the town of Nakamichi was amalgamated into the city of Kōfu on March 1. 2006, Ashigawa became the sole village within Higashihyatsushiro District until August 1, 2006.
