= Kamikuishiki, Yamanashi =

Dissolved municipality in Japan

Kamikuishiki 上九一色村 かみくいしきむら
- Village
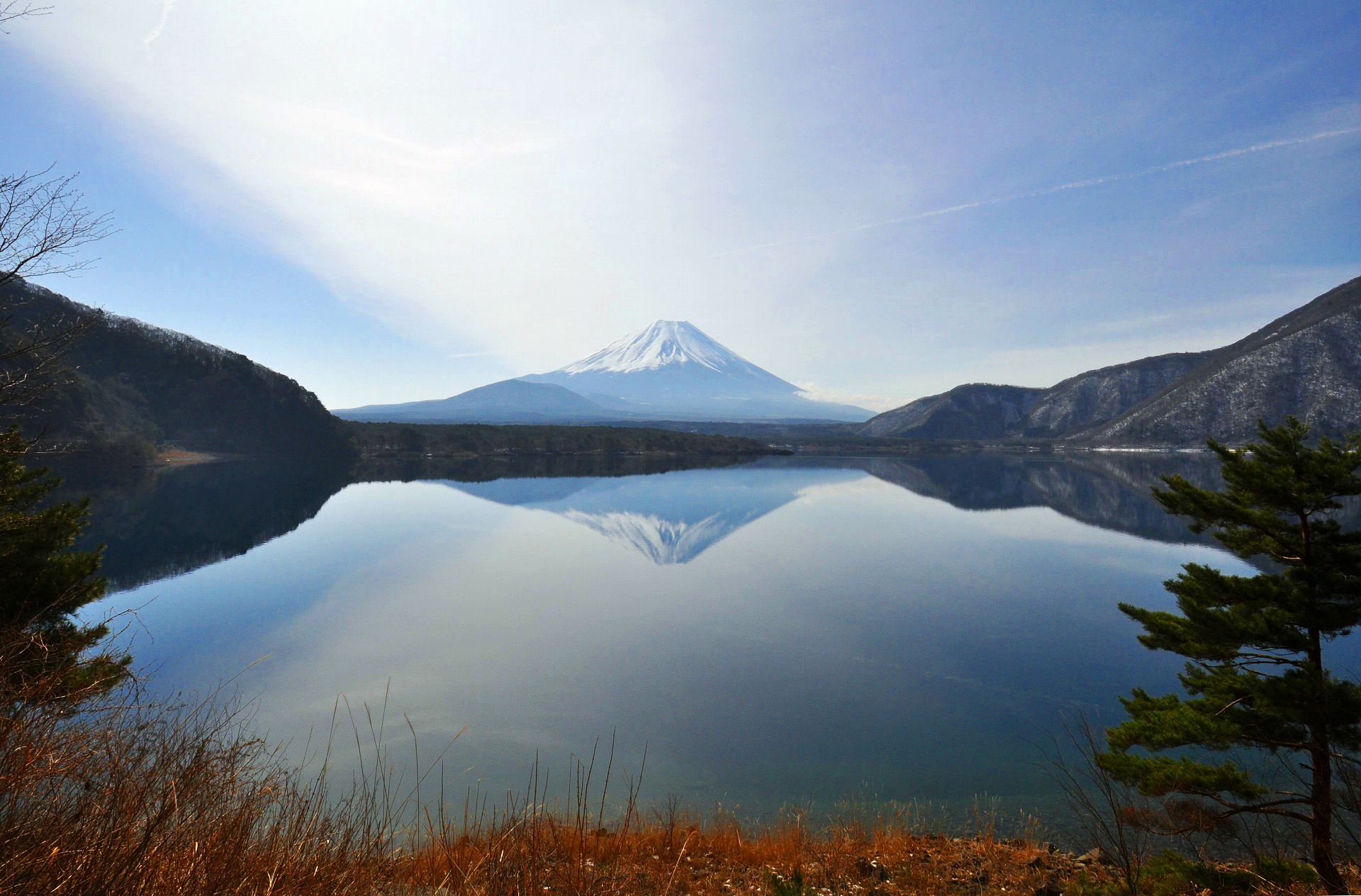
- Lake Motosu with Mount Fuji in the distance

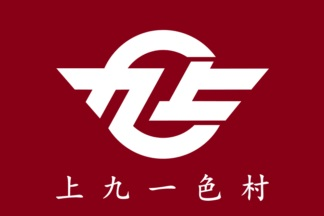
- Flag Seal
- Interactive map of Kamikuishiki
- Country: Japan
- Region: Chūbu (Kōshin'etsu)
- Prefecture: Yamanashi
- District: Nishiyatsushiro
- Merged: March 1, 2006

Area
  - Total: 86.59 km^{2} (33.43 sq mi)

Population (2006)
  - Total: 1,501
  - Density: 17.33/km^{2} (44.90/sq mi)

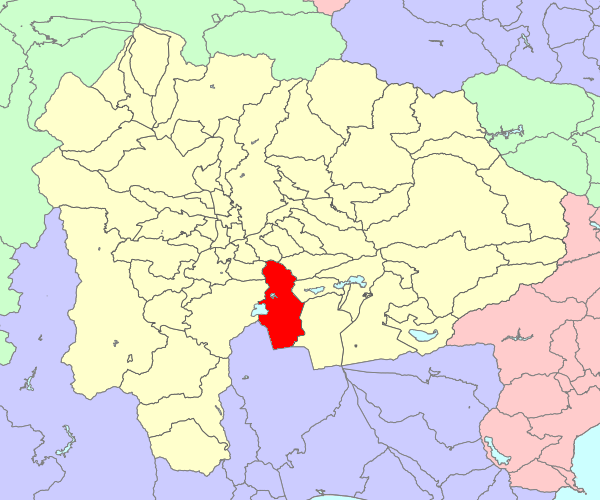
Location of Kamikuishiki within Yamanashi Prefecture

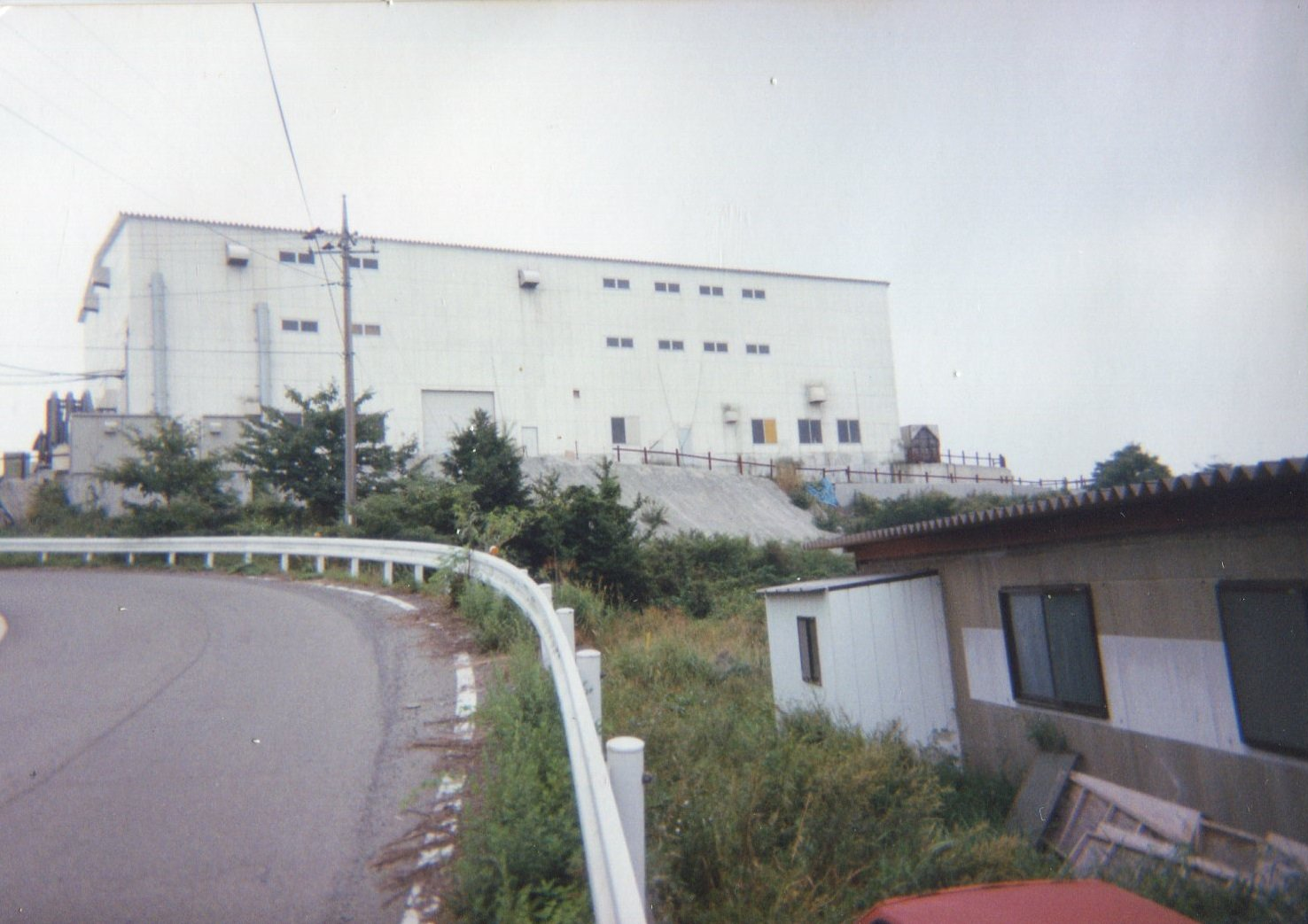
Aum Shinrikyo facility in Kamikuishiki.

Kamikuishiki (上九一色村, Kamikuishiki-mura; lit. 'up-nine-one-color') was a village located in Nishiyatsushiro District, Yamanashi Prefecture, Japan.

As of 2006, the village had an estimated population of 1,501 and a density of 17 persons per km^{2}. The total area was 86.59 km^{2}.

Kamikuishiki achieved nationwide infamy in Japan as a major center of the notorious cult religion Aum Shinrikyo which built its religious center and several facilities there. This included a production center named Satyan 7, located in the Fujigamine district for nerve gases which were used in attacks on the Tokyo subway and in Matsumoto. It was in one of these buildings that the leader of the cult Shoko Asahara was arrested on May 16, 1995.

On March 1, 2006:

- The northern part of Kamikuishiki (the localities of Furuseki and Kakehashi), along with the town of Nakamichi (from Higashiyatsushiro District), was merged into the expanded city of Kōfu.
- The southern part of Kamikuishiki (the localities of Fujigane, Motosu and Shoji) was merged into the expanded town of Fujikawaguchiko (of Minamitsuru District). Kamikuishiki was officially dissolved as an independent municipality. According to the last mayor Makoto Kobayashi, "financial reasons" made the decision inevitable. Economic decline made the villagers leave for larger areas where jobs are more readily available. Reduced tax collections and aging population also played their role.

Lake Shōji and Lake Motosu, two of the famous Fuji Five Lakes, are in Kamikuishiki.
