= Yamato, Yamanashi =

Dissolved municipality in Yamanashi prefecture, Japan

Yamato (大和村, Yamato-mura) was a village located in Higashiyamanashi District, Yamanashi Prefecture, Japan.

As of 2003, the village has an estimated population of 1,495 and a density of 34.74 persons per km^{2}. The total area is 43.03 km^{2}.

== History ==
The village was established in 1941 by merging five villages from two different districts: Hajikano, and Tsuruse from Higashi-yamanashi; Tokusa, Tano, and Hikage from Higashi-yatsushiro.

On November 1, 2005 Yamato, along with the city of Enzan, and the town of Katsunuma (also from Higashiyamanashi District), was merged to create the city of Kōshū.
