= Nakamichi, Yamanashi =

Former town in Yamanashi Prefecture, Japan

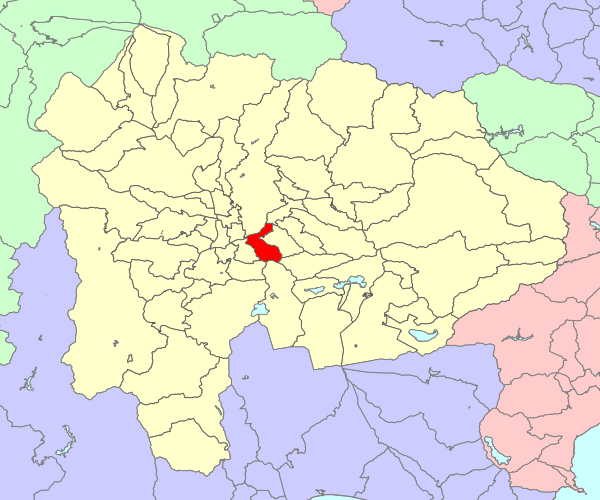
Location map of former Nakamichi Town

Nakamichi (中道町, Nakamichi-machi) was a town located in Higashiyatsushiro District, Yamanashi Prefecture, Japan.

As of 2003, the town had an estimated population of 5,632 and a population density of 267.94 persons per km^{2}. The total area is 21.02 km^{2}.

== History ==
On March 1, 2006, Nakamichi, along with the northern part of the village of Kamikuishiki (the localities of Furuseki and Kakehashi) (from Nishiyatsushiro District), was merged into the expanded city of Kōfu.

== Geography ==
=== Topography and Hydrography ===
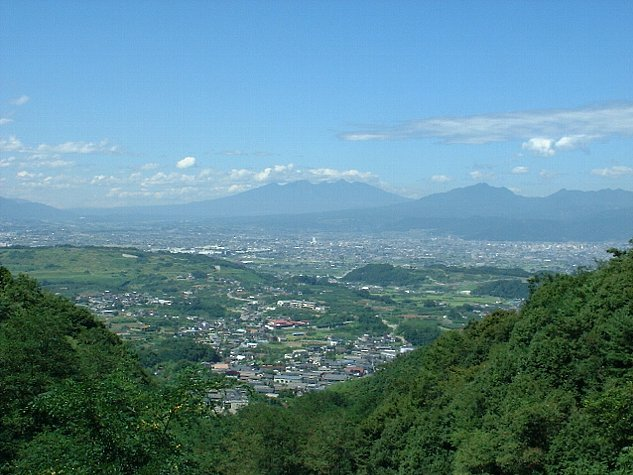
Nakamichi seen from the Ubaguchi Pass.

Located at the southeastern edge of the 甲府盆地 (甲府盆地), Nakamichi is the southern gateway to Kōfu. Long and narrow in shape, the town is traversed from north to south by National Route 358. The northern part is a floodplain on the left bank of the Fuefuki-gawa (笛吹川). The Takido-gawa (滝戸川), which flows into the Fuefuki, runs through the center of the town. To the south, the Sone Hills extend from the 御坂山地 (御坂山地), featuring small, rounded hills in the foreground. The southern part is part of the Misaka Mountains · . The municipality covers an area of 21.02 km^{2} (8.12 sq mi).

== Sources ==
- Yokota, Tadao (1976), 中道町史 [Nakamichi Town History] (in Japanese), Nakamichi Town Hall
- Yokota, Tadao (1995), 山梨県の地名 日本歴史地名大系 [Place Names in Yamanashi Prefecture: Japan Historical Place Names] (in Japanese), Heibonsha, ISBN 4-582-49019-0
