= Fuefuki River =

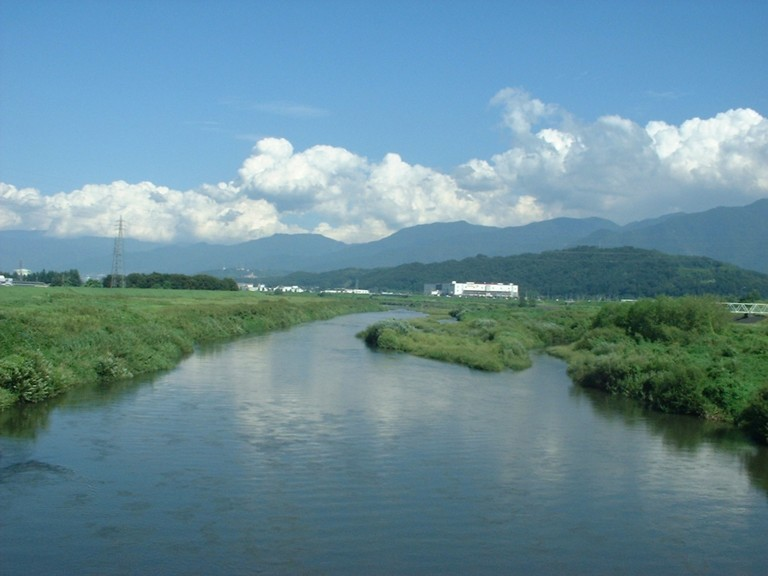
- Fuefuki River in Fuefuki, Japan

- Location within Japan
- Native name: 笛吹川 (Japanese)

Location
- Country: Japan
- Region: Chūbu
- Cities and towns: Koshu, Yamanashi, Fuefuki, Kōfu, Chūō, Ichikawamisato

Physical characteristics
- Source: Mount Kobushi
  - location: Yamanashi
  - coordinates: 35°54′33″N 138°43′44″E
  - elevation: 2,475 m (8,120 ft)
- Mouth: Fuji River
  - location: Ichikawamisato
  - coordinates: 35°32′56″N 138°28′22″E
  - elevation: 235 m (771 ft)
- Length: 56 km (35 mi)
- Basin size: 1,040 km^{2} (400 sq mi)

Basin features
- River system: Fuji river basin

The Fuefuki River (笛吹川, Fuefuki-gawa) is a river located in the Yamanashi Prefecture of Japan. It is a tributary of the Fuji River.

== Geography ==
The Fuefuki River has its source the neighboring mountains of Mount Kobushi on the southern slope of Mount Kobushi in the north of Yamanashi, on Honshu, in Japan. Its course takes a southeast direction to the Hirose dam then south, in the east of Yamanashi. Leaving Yamanashi, it successively crosses the northwest of Fuefuki to which it gives its name, south of Kōfu, central Chūō and the northwest of the town of Ichikawamisato. Near the boundary between Ichikawamisato and Fujikawa, the Fuefuki and Kamanashi rivers converge and form the Fuji River.

The watershed of the Fuefuki River covers an area of 1,040 km^{2} (400 sq mi) in the northwest of Yamanashi prefecture.
