= Misaka, Yamanashi =

Former town in Yamanashi prefecture, Japan

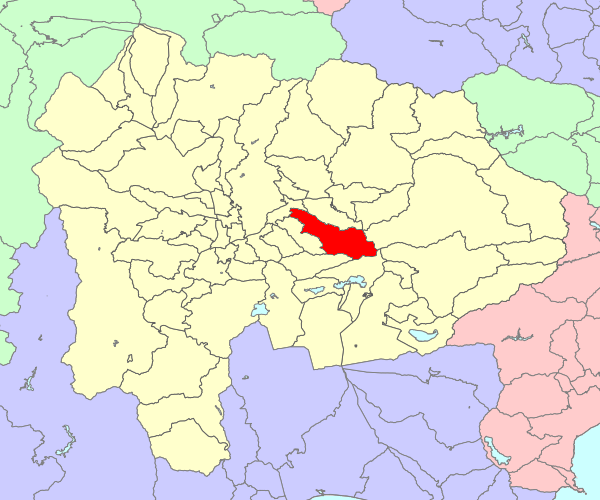
Map of former Misaka Town

Misaka (御坂町, Misaka-chō) was a town located in Higashiyatsushiro District, Yamanashi Prefecture, Japan.

As of 2003, the town had an estimated population of 12,116 and a density of 207.57 persons per km^{2}. The total area was 58.37 km^{2}.

On October 12, 2004, Misaka, along with the towns of Ichinomiya, Isawa and Yatsushiro, the village of Sakaigawa (all from Higashiyatsushiro District), and the town of Kasugai (from Higashiyamanashi District), was merged to create the city of Fuefuki.
