= Katsunuma, Yamanashi =

Dissolved municipality in Yamanashi prefecture, Japan

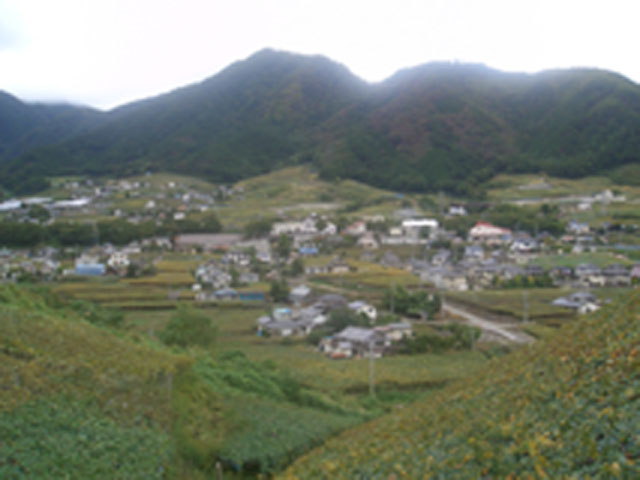

Katsunuma (勝沼町, Katsunuma-chō) was a town in Higashiyamanashi District, Yamanashi Prefecture, Japan.

As of 2003, the town had an estimated population of 9,271 and a density of 255.82 persons per km^{2}. The total area was 36.24 km^{2}.

On November 1, 2005, Katsunuma, the city of Enzan, and the village of Yamato (also from Higashiyamanashi District), were merged to create the city of Kōshū.

Katsunuma is also popular for white wines.

== See also ==
- Japanese wine
- Battle of Kōshū-Katsunuma
