= Ichinomiya, Yamanashi =

Dissolved municipality in Yamanashi prefecture, Japan

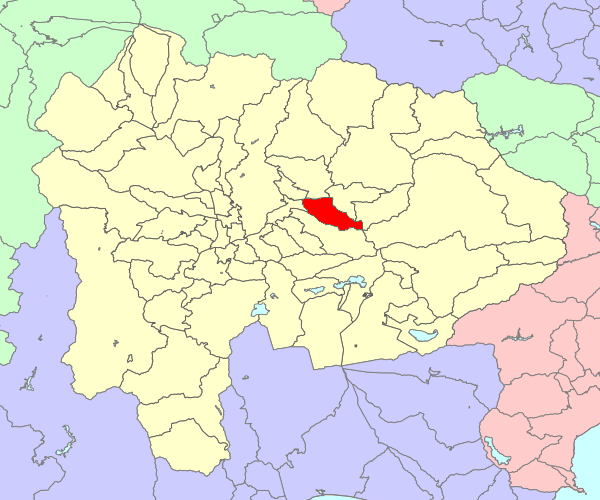
former Ichinomiya Town

Ichinomiya (一宮町, Ichinomiya-chō) was a town located in Higashiyatsushiro District, Yamanashi Prefecture, Japan. As of 2003, the town had an estimated population of 11,111 and a density of 362.87 persons per km^{2}. The total area was 30.62 km^{2}. Ichinomiya literally means "the first shrine" of the province. In case of this town, it is the Sengen Shrine of the Kai Province.

== History ==
On October 12, 2004, Ichinomiya, along with the towns of Isawa, Misaka and Yatsushiro, the village of Sakaigawa (all from Higashiyatsushiro District), and the town of Kasugai (from Higashiyamanashi District), was merged to create the city of Fuefuki.

== Transportation ==
- Route 20 to Tokyo or Shiojiri
- Route 411 to Ōme via Okutama
- Ichinomiya-Misaka IC, Chūō Highway

== Special Products ==
- Peaches
