= Kōshū, Yamanashi =

Kōshū 甲州市
- City
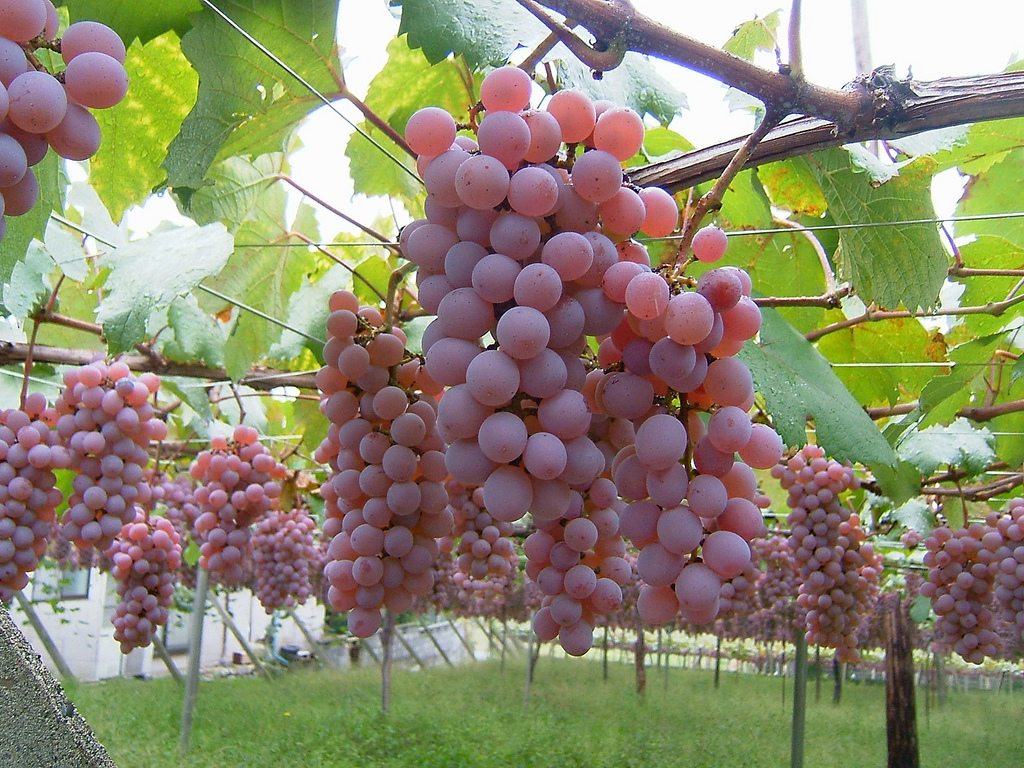
- Katsunuma vineyard

- Flag Seal

- Location of Kōshū in Yamanashi Prefecture

- Coordinates: 35°42′15.6″N 138°43′45.9″E
- Country: Japan
- Region: Chūbu (Tōkai)
- Prefecture: Yamanashi Prefecture

Government
  - Mayor: Atsushi Tanabe (since December 2005)

Area
  - Total: 264.11 km^{2} (101.97 sq mi)

Population (October 1, 2020)
  - Total: 29,237
  - Density: 110.70/km^{2} (286.71/sq mi)
- Time zone: UTC+9 (Japan Standard Time)
- Phone number: 0553-32-2111
- Address: Enzan-Kamiozo 1085-1, Koshū-shi, Yamanashi-ken 404-8501
- Climate: Cfa
- Website: Official website
- Symbols
- Bird: Cettia diphone
- Flower: Cherry blossom
- Tree: Grape

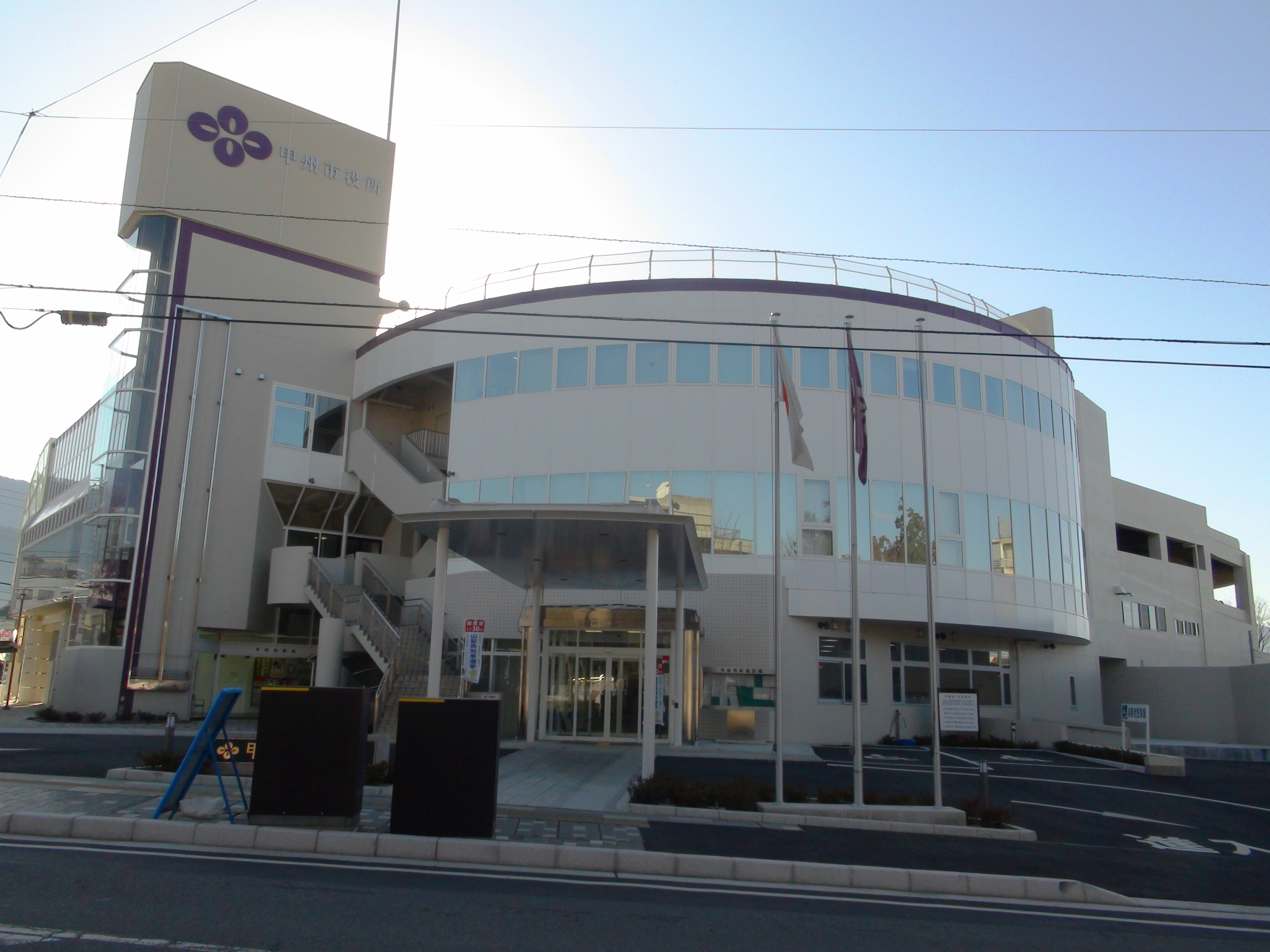
Kōshū City Hall

Kōshū (甲州市, Kōshū-shi; Japanese pronunciation: [kó̞ò̞.ɕɨ̀ɨ̀, kò̞ó̞.ɕɨ́ɨ̀.ɕì, kó̞ó̞.ɕɨ́ɨ̀-]) is a city located in Yamanashi Prefecture, Japan. As of 1 September 2020, the city had an estimated population of 29,659 in 13,141 households, and a population density of 120 persons per km². The total area of the city is 264.11 square kilometres (101.97 sq mi). The city is the home of the indigenous Koshu grape and is synonymous with viticulture and wine production in Japan.

== Geography ==
Kōshū is in northeastern Yamanashi Prefecture, occupying the eastern portion of the Kofu Basin. Parts of the city are within the borders of the Chichibu Tama Kai National Park. The peak of Mount Daibosatsu, at 2,057 meters, is within the city limits.

=== Rivers ===
- Fuefuki River
- Omo River(Yamanashi)
- Hi River

=== Neighboring municipalities ===
- Saitama Prefecture
  - Chichibu
- Yamanashi Prefecture
  - Fuefuki
  - Kosuge
  - Ōtsuki
  - Tabayama
  - Yamanashi

== Climate ==
The city has a climate characterized by hot and humid summers, and relatively mild winters (Köppen climate classification Cfa). The average annual temperature in Kōshū is 10.1 °C. The average annual rainfall is 1477 mm with September as the wettest month. The temperatures are highest on average in August, at around 22.5 °C, and lowest in January, at around -1.8 °C.

Climate data for Katsunuma, Kōshū (1991−2020 normals, extremes 1977−present)
Month	Jan	Feb	Mar	Apr	May	Jun	Jul	Aug	Sep	Oct	Nov	Dec	Year
Record high °C (°F)	17.2 (63.0)	24.0 (75.2)	27.1 (80.8)	31.9 (89.4)	34.9 (94.8)	39.2 (102.6)	40.2 (104.4)	40.5 (104.9)	38.5 (101.3)	33.4 (92.1)	27.4 (81.3)	23.0 (73.4)	40.5 (104.9)
Mean daily maximum °C (°F)	8.3 (46.9)	10.0 (50.0)	14.2 (57.6)	20.3 (68.5)	25.0 (77.0)	27.5 (81.5)	31.3 (88.3)	32.7 (90.9)	28.2 (82.8)	21.9 (71.4)	16.1 (61.0)	10.7 (51.3)	20.5 (68.9)
Daily mean °C (°F)	2.1 (35.8)	3.6 (38.5)	7.6 (45.7)	13.2 (55.8)	18.0 (64.4)	21.5 (70.7)	25.2 (77.4)	26.1 (79.0)	22.2 (72.0)	16.0 (60.8)	9.8 (49.6)	4.5 (40.1)	14.1 (57.4)
Mean daily minimum °C (°F)	−3.0 (26.6)	−1.8 (28.8)	2.0 (35.6)	7.3 (45.1)	12.5 (54.5)	17.0 (62.6)	21.1 (70.0)	21.9 (71.4)	17.9 (64.2)	11.6 (52.9)	4.8 (40.6)	0.6 (33.1)	9.2 (48.6)
Record low °C (°F)	−11.3 (11.7)	−10.6 (12.9)	−6.7 (19.9)	−3.7 (25.3)	1.6 (34.9)	9.1 (48.4)	13.3 (55.9)	14.0 (57.2)	6.7 (44.1)	0.7 (33.3)	−3.1 (26.4)	−8.5 (16.7)	−11.3 (11.7)
Average precipitation mm (inches)	38.9 (1.53)	38.5 (1.52)	73.7 (2.90)	73.0 (2.87)	84.3 (3.32)	113.2 (4.46)	140.2 (5.52)	123.8 (4.87)	182.5 (7.19)	150.6 (5.93)	52.2 (2.06)	35.3 (1.39)	1,106.1 (43.55)
Average precipitation days (≥ 1.0 mm)	4.5	5.0	8.3	7.7	8.9	11.1	11.5	9.2	10.3	8.9	5.7	4.3	95.3
Mean monthly sunshine hours	209.0	197.6	201.1	205.0	200.4	144.8	165.1	197.2	149.7	158.0	180.2	201.2	2,209.4
Source: Japan Meteorological Agency (1991–2020 normals, extremes 1977–present)

== Demographics ==
Per Japanese census data, the population of Kōshū has declined in recent decades.

Historical population
Year	Pop.	±%
1940	38,208	—
1950	47,719	+24.9%
1960	43,076	−9.7%
1970	38,138	−11.5%
1980	37,269	−2.3%
1990	37,038	−0.6%
2000	36,925	−0.3%
2010	33,927	−8.1%
2020	29,237	−13.8%

== History ==
Kōshū is located near the center of ancient Kai Province and contains many ruins from the Jōmon period and burial mounds from the Kofun period. During the Heian period, the area was developed in shōen under control of the Minamoto clan, which devolved into feudal holdings by the Nikaido clan and later the Takeda clan from the Kamakura through Sengoku periods. During the Edo period, all of Kai Province was tenryō territory under direct control of the Tokugawa shogunate. Following the Meiji restoration, the area was organized into villages within Yamanashi District of Yamanashi Prefecture, which was later divided into Higashiyamanashi District and Nishiyamanashi District Many of these villages were consolidated into the city of Enzan, the town of Katsunuma, and the village of Yamato by April 1, 1955. The modern city of Kōshū was established on November 1, 2005, from the merger of these three municipalities.

== Government ==
Kōshū has a mayor-council form of government with a directly elected mayor and a unicameral city legislature of 18 members. The city supplies two members to the Yamanashi Prefectural Assembly.

== Economy ==
Most of the area of the city is agricultural, and is especially known for its production of peaches, grapes and wine.

== Education ==
Kōshū has 14 public elementary schools and six public junior high schools operated by the city government and one public high school operated by the Yamanashi Prefectural Board of Education. Then prefectural also operates the Yamanashi Industrial Technology Junior College.

== Transportation ==
=== Railway ===
- East Japan Railway Company - Chūō Main Line
  - Kai-Yamato - Katsunuma-budōkyō – Enzan

=== Highway ===
- Chūō Expressway
- National Route 20
- National Route 140
- National Route 411

== Sister cities ==
- Ames, Iowa, United States, since September 20, 1993 with former Enzan City
- Beaune, Côte-d'Or, France, since September 18, 1976 with former Katsunuma City
- (Japan) Futtsu, Chiba, since December 1, 1977 with former Enzan City
- Turpan, Xinjiang, China, since October 3, 2000 with former Katsunuma City

== Local attractions ==
=== Places ===
- Daizen-ji, Buddhist temple with a Yakushi-do designated as a National Treasure
- Erin-ji, Buddhist temple with Japanese garden designed as a national Place of Scenic Beauty
- Kaikinzan gold mines, Sengoku period mine and National Historic Site
- Katsunuma clan residence ruins, a National Historic Site
- Kōgaku-ji, Buddhist temple with Japanese garden designed as a national Place of Scenic Beauty
- Mitake Shōsenkyō, River gorge and nationally designated Special Place of Scenic Beauty
- Shakado Museum Of Jomon Culture

=== Events ===
Every year in autumn the "Koshu Fruit Marathon" is held. While it is called a "marathon" (the word is commonly used in Japan to describe races of varying distances) it actually consists of several shorter races, a 3.5 family race, a 10 km race, a half-marathon, and a 23 km race.

== Notable people ==
- Eijun Kiyokumo, professional football player
- Tomokazu Miura, actor
- Hiroko Nakamura, pianist
- Yoshio Tsuchiya, actor
- Terutomo Yamazaki, karateka and kick boxer
