= Kasugai, Yamanashi =

Dissolved municipality in Yamanashi prefecture, Japan

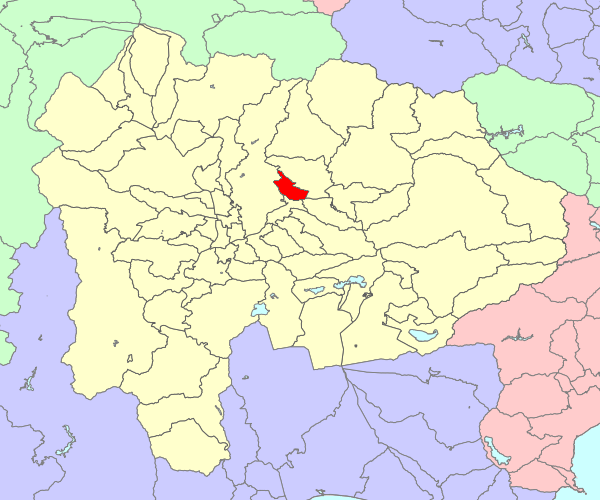
map of former Kasugai Town

Kasugai (春日居町, Kasugai-chō) was a town located in Higashiyamanashi District, Yamanashi Prefecture, Japan.

As of 2003, the town had an estimated population of 7,689 and a density of 558.39 persons per km^{2}. The total area was 13.77 km^{2}.

== History ==
On October 12, 2004, Kasugai, along the towns of Ichinomiya, Isawa, Misaka and Yatsushiro, and the village of Sakaigawa (all from Higashiyatsushiro District), was merged to create the city of Fuefuki.
