= Mount Kobushi =

Mountain in Kantō, Japan

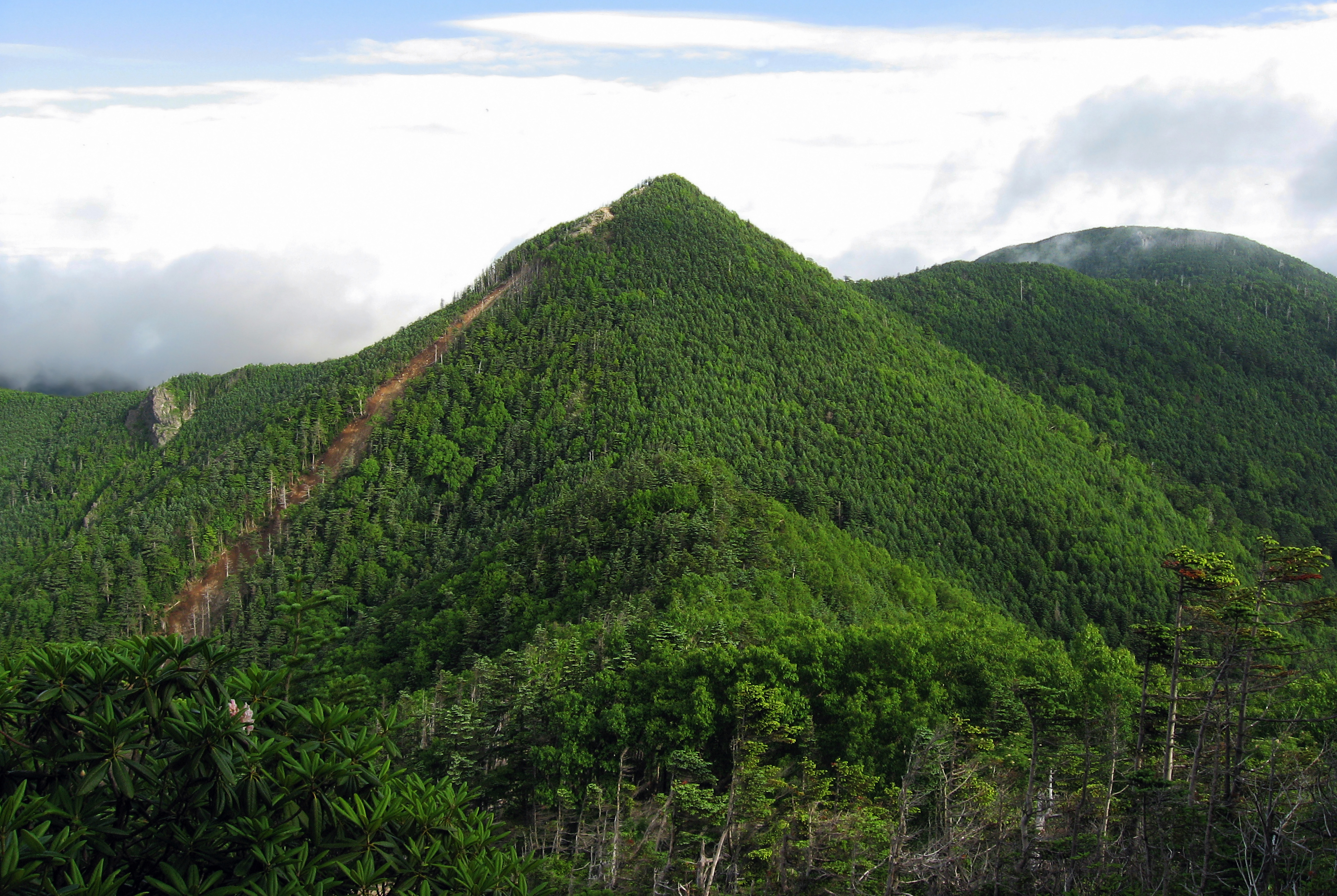
- Mount Kobushi from Mount Tokusa

Highest point
- Elevation: 2,475 m (8,120 ft)
- Listing: 100 Famous Japanese Mountains
- Coordinates: 35°54′32″N 138°43′44″E

Geography
- Location within Japan
- Location: Honshu, Japan
- Parent range: Okuchichibu Mountains

Mount Kobushi (甲武信ヶ岳, Kobushigadake) is a mountain on the border of Saitama, Yamanashi, and Nagano prefectures in Japan. The mountain is the source of the Arakawa and Shinano Rivers. It is one of the 100 Famous Japanese Mountains.
