= Yatsushiro, Yamanashi =

Dissolved municipality in Yamanashi prefecture, Japan

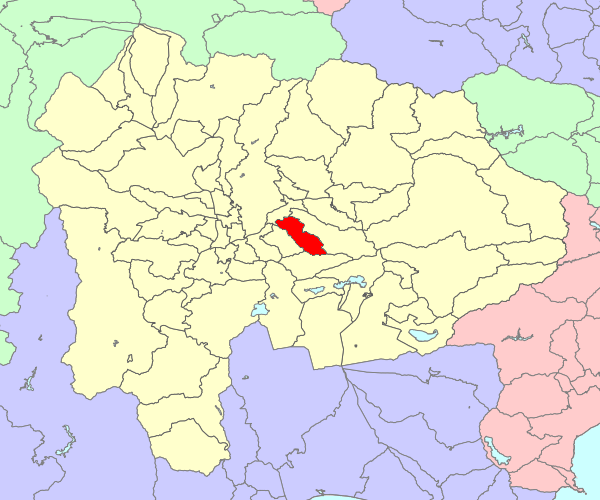
Map of former Yatsushiro Town

Yatsushiro (八代町, Yatsushiro-chō) was a town located in Higashiyatsushiro District, Yamanashi Prefecture, Japan.

As of 2003, the town had an estimated population of 8,540 and a density of 333.20 persons per km^{2}. The total area was 25.63 km^{2}.

== History ==
On October 12, 2004, Yatsushiro, along with the towns of Ichinomiya, Isawa and Misaka, the village of Sakaigawa (all from Higashiyatsushiro District), and the town of Kasugai (from Higashiyamanashi District), was merged to create the city of Fuefuki.
