= Enzan, Yamanashi =

Dissolved municipality in Yamanashi prefecture, Japan

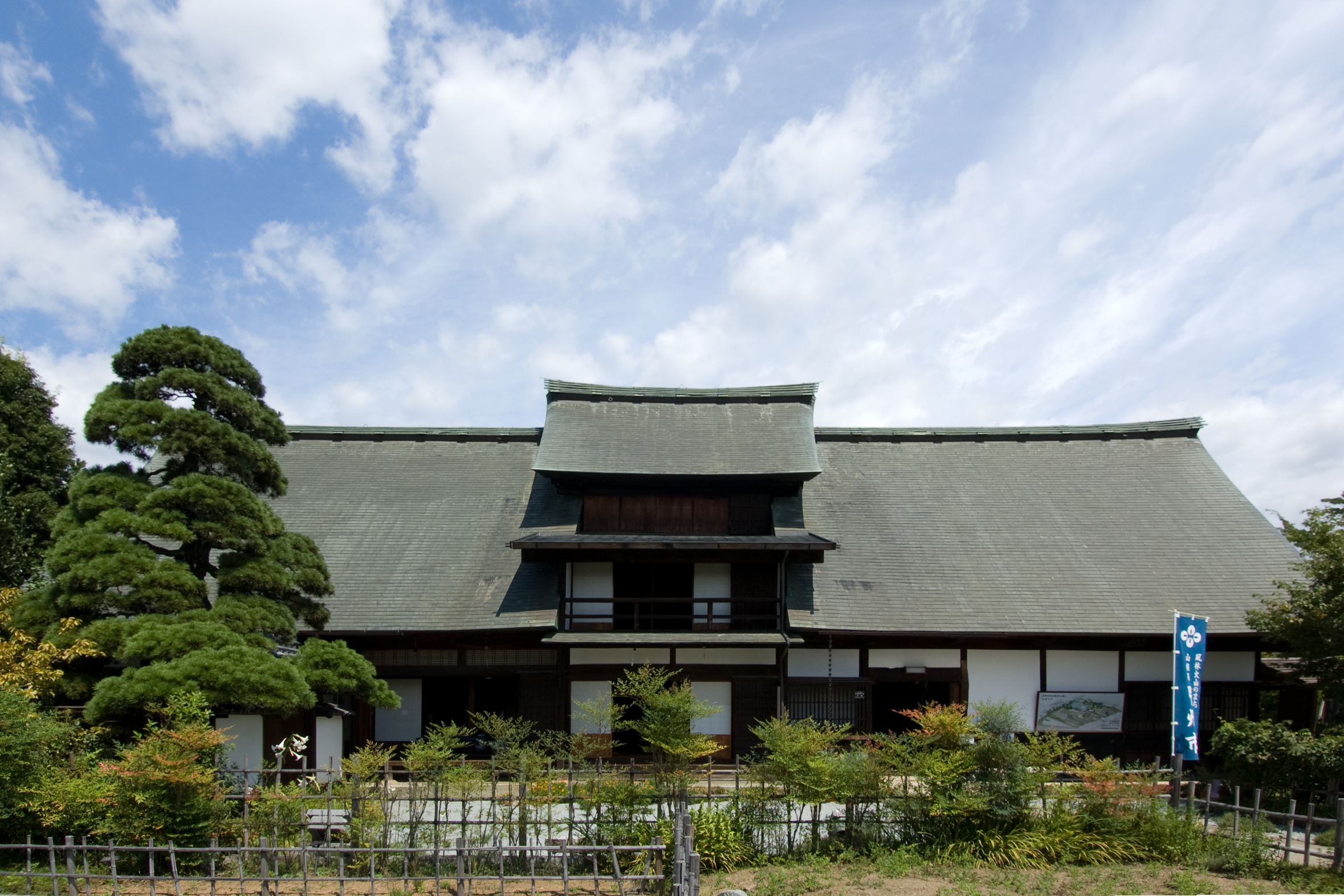
Old Takano House, at Kōshū, Yamanashi, Japan, build in 19th century

Enzan (塩山市, Enzan-shi) was a city located in Yamanashi Prefecture, Japan. The city was founded on April 5, 1954.

As of 2003, the city had an estimated population of 25,856 and the density of 139.96 persons per km^{2}. The total area was 184.74 km^{2}.

== History ==
On November 1, 2005, Enzan, along with the town of Katsunuma, and the village of Yamato (both from Higashiyamanashi District), was merged to create the city of Kōshū.

== Education ==
There are 3 Junior High Schools in Enzan:

- Enzan Junior High
- Matsusato Junior High
- Enzan Kita Junior High (Closed, 2025)

== Notable people ==
- Actor Tomokazu Miura was born in Enzan in 1952.
