= Higashiyamanashi District, Yamanashi =

Former district in Yamanashi Prefecture, Japan

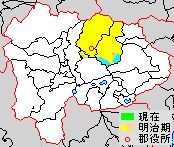
Map showing original extent of Higashiyamanashi District in Yamanashi Prefecture: * yellow - areas formerly within the district borders during the early Meiji period

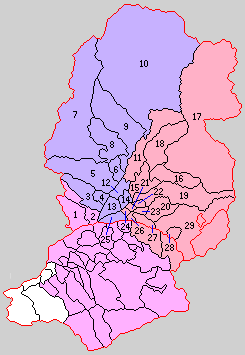
Colored areas are in this district.

Higashiyamanashi (東山梨郡, Higashiyamanashi-gun) was a district located in Yamanashi Prefecture, Japan.

As of 2004, the district had an estimated population of 10,701 persons with a density of 135 persons per km^{2}. The total area was 79.27 km^{2}.

== Municipalities ==
Prior to its dissolution, the district consisted of three towns:

- Kasugai (Note: Classified as a town.)
- Katsunuma
- Yamato

== History ==
=== Recent mergers ===
- On October 12, 2004 - the town of Kasugai was merged with the towns of Ichinomiya, Isawa, Misaka and Yatsushiro, and the village of Sakaigawa (all from Higashiyatsushiro District), to form the city of Fuefuki.
- On March 22, 2005 - the town of Makioka and the village of Mitomi were merged into the expanded city of Yamanashi.
- On November 1, 2005 - the towns of Katsunuma and Yamato were merged with the city of Enzan to form the city of Kōshū. Higashiyamanashi District was dissolved as a result of this merger.

== See also ==
- List of dissolved districts of Japan
