= Isawa, Yamanashi =

Dissolved municipality in Yamanashi prefecture, Japan

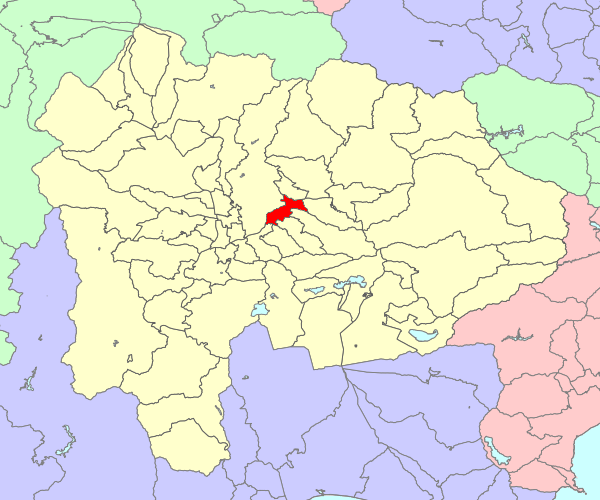
Map of former Isawa Town

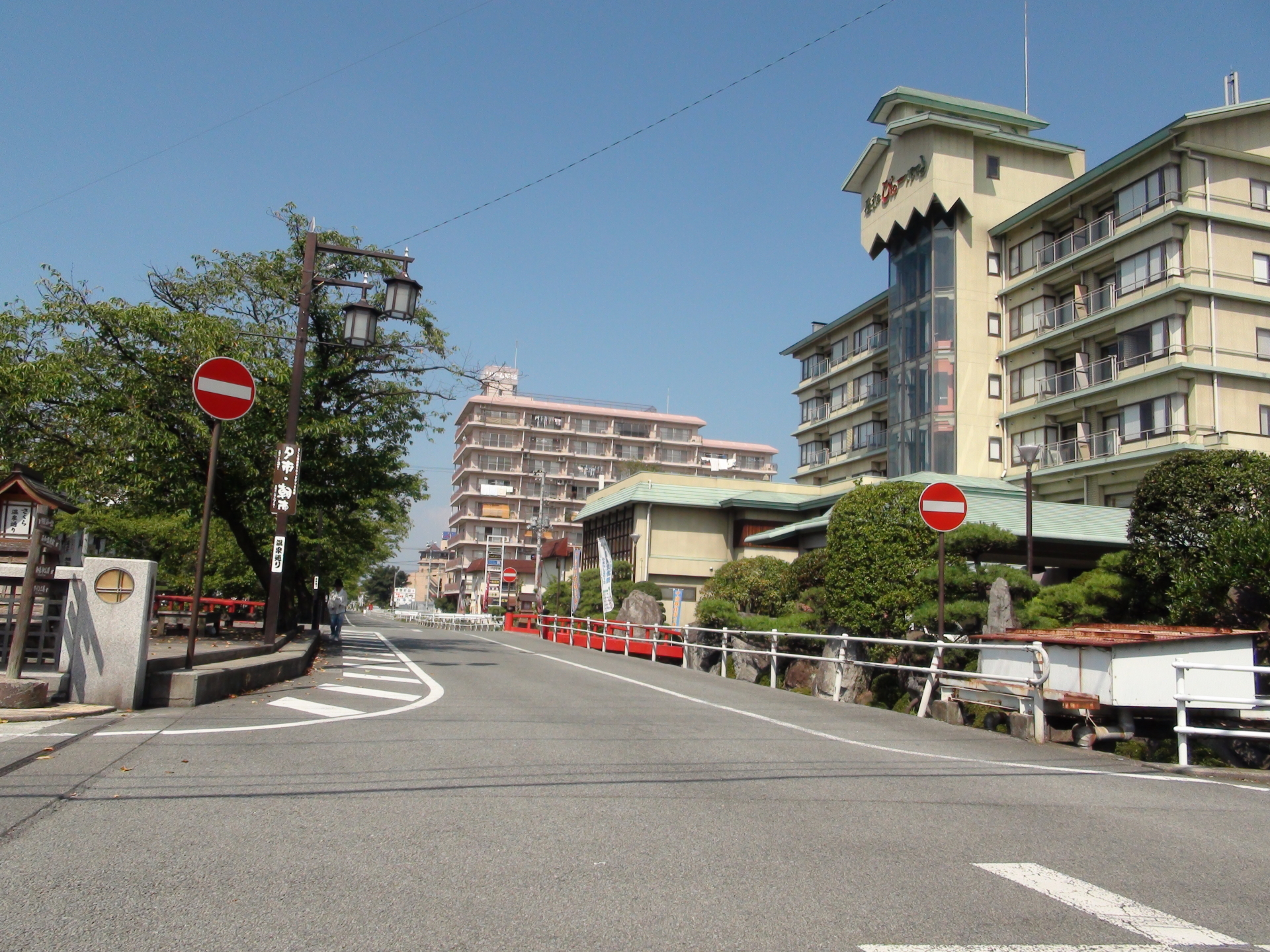
Isawa Spa Town

Isawa (石和町, Isawa-chō) was a town located in Higashiyatsushiro District, Yamanashi Prefecture, Japan. As of 2003, the town had an estimated population of 27,603 and a density of 1,850.07 persons per km^{2}. The total area was 14.92 km^{2}.

It was famous for its hot springs and for its springtime medieval festival. It was a sister city to Bad Mergentheim, Germany.

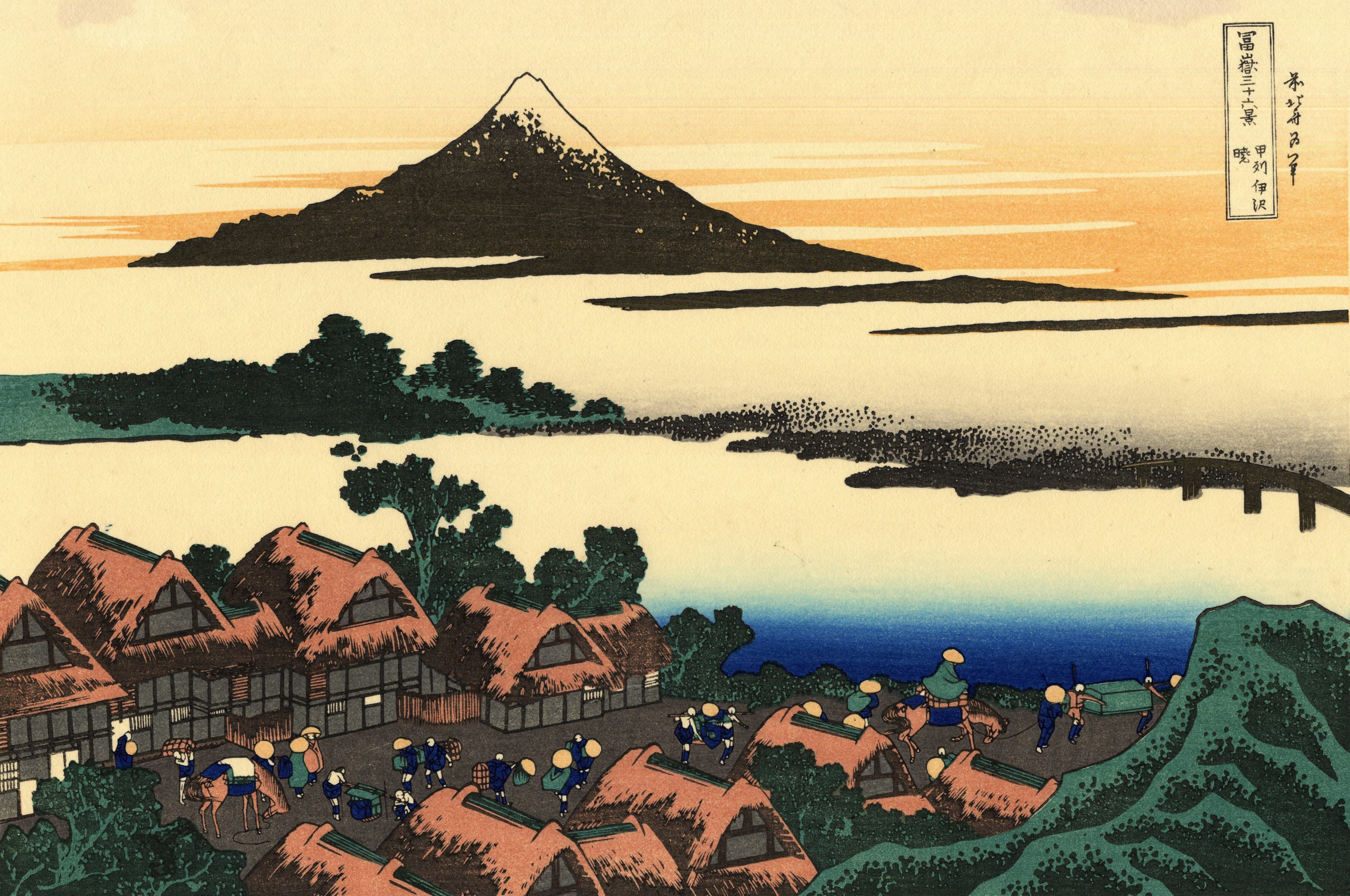
Hokusai

== History ==
On October 12, 2004, Isawa, along with the towns of Ichinomiya, Misaka and Yatsushiro, the village of Sakaigawa (all from Higashiyatsushiro District), and the town of Kasugai (from Higashiyamanashi District), was merged to create the city of Fuefuki.
