= Sakaigawa, Yamanashi =

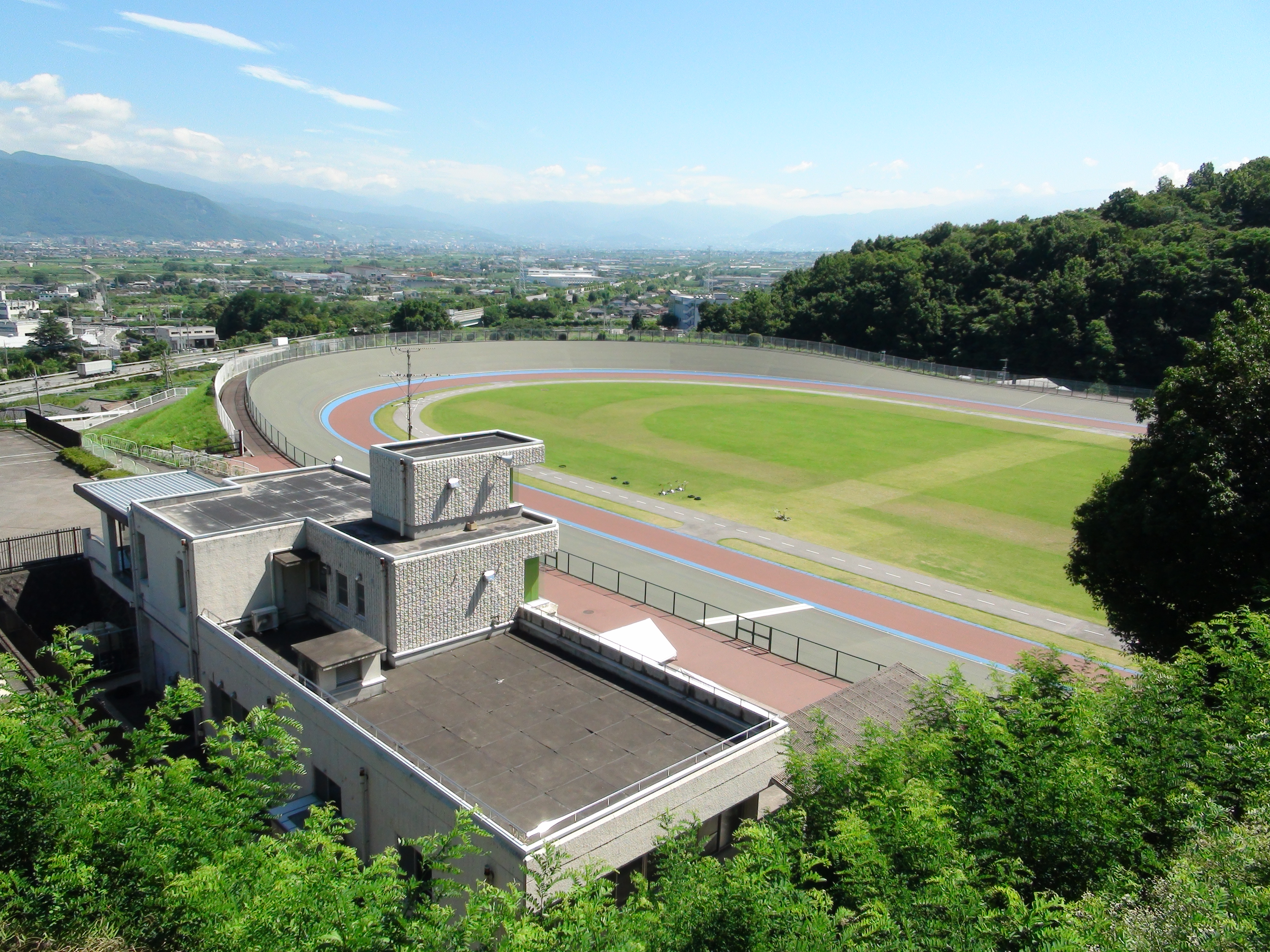
- Sakaigawa Velodrome

- Flag Emblem

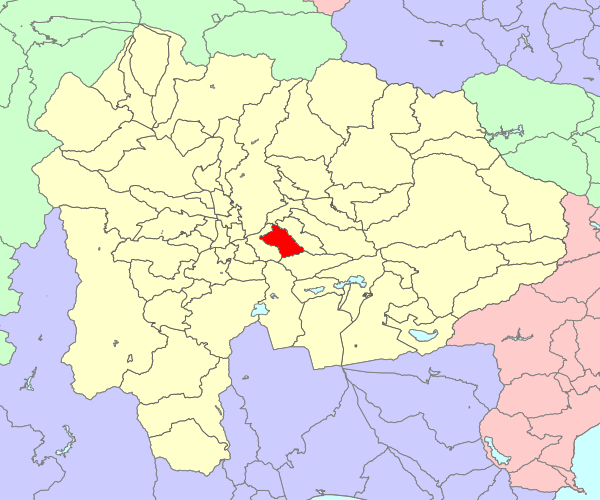
- Map of former Sakaigawa Village

Sakaigawa (境川村, Sakaigawa-mura) was a village located in Higashiyatsushiro District, Yamanashi Prefecture, Japan.

As of 2003, the village had an estimated population of 4,640 and a density of 216.22 persons per km^{2}. The total area was 21.46 km^{2}.

On October 12, 2004, Sakaigawa, along with the towns of Ichinomiya, Isawa, Misaka and Yatsushiro (all from Higashiyatsushiro District), and the town of Kasugai (from Higashiyamanashi District), was merged to create the city of Fuefuki.
