= Ichikawadaimon, Yamanashi =

Dissolved municipality in Yamanashi prefecture, Japan

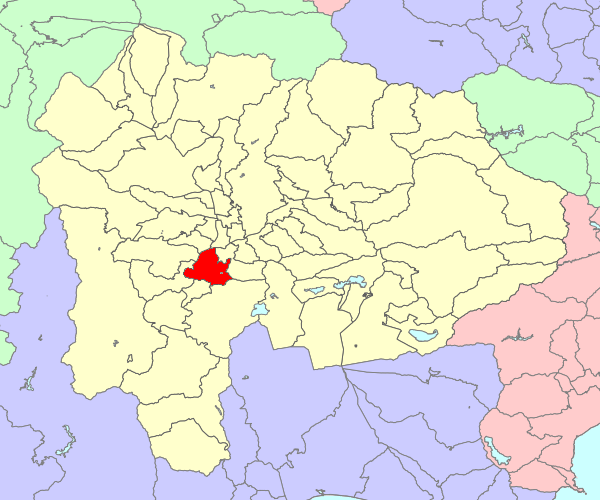
Location map of former Ichikawadaimon town

Ichikawadaimon (市川大門町, Ichikawadaimon-chō) was a town located in Nishiyatsushiro District, Yamanashi Prefecture, Japan.

As of 2003, the town had an estimated population of 10,421 and a population density of 322.43 persons per km^{2}. The total area was 32.32 square kilometres (12.48 sq mi).

On October 1, 2005, Ichikawadaimon, along with the towns of Mitama and Rokugō (all from Nishiyatsushiro District), was merged to create the town of Ichikawamisato.
