= Rokugō, Yamanashi =

Dissolved municipality in Yamanashi prefecture, Japan

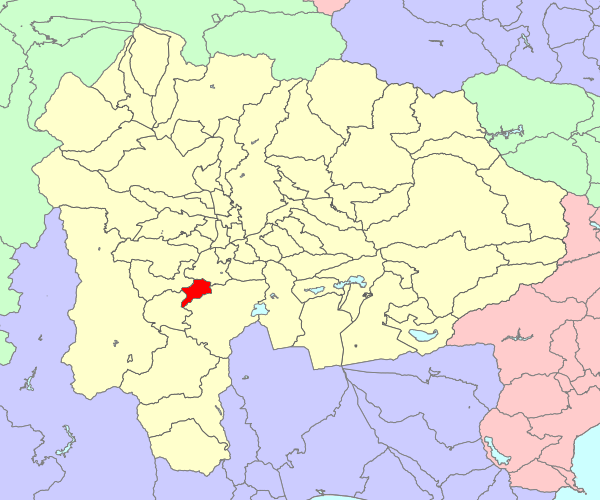
Location map of former Rokugō town

Rokugō (六郷町, Rokugō-chō) was a town located in Nishiyatsushiro District, Yamanashi Prefecture, Japan.

As of 2003, the town had an estimated population of 3,861 and a population density of 290.74 persons per km^{2}. The total area was 13.28 km^{2}.

On October 1, 2005, Rokugō, along with the towns of Ichikawadaimon and Mitama (all from Nishiyatsushiro District), was merged to create the town of Ichikawamisato.
