= Mitama, Yamanashi =

Dissolved municipality in Yamanashi prefecture, Japan

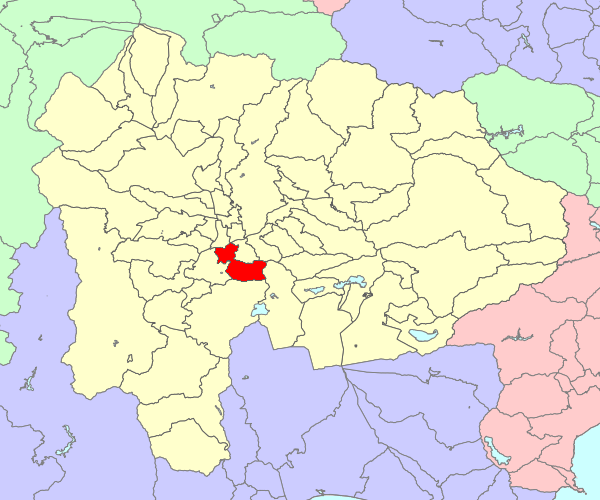
Location map of former Mitama town

Mitama (三珠町, Mitama-chō) was a town located in Nishiyatsushiro District, Yamanashi Prefecture, Japan.

As of 2003, the town had an estimated population of 4,047 and a population density of 137.33 persons per km^{2}. The total area was 29.47 km^{2}.

On October 1, 2005, Mitama, along with the towns of Ichikawadaimon and Rokugō (all from Nishiyatsushiro District), was merged to create the town of Ichikawamisato.
