= Fuefuki =

Fuefuki 笛吹市
- City
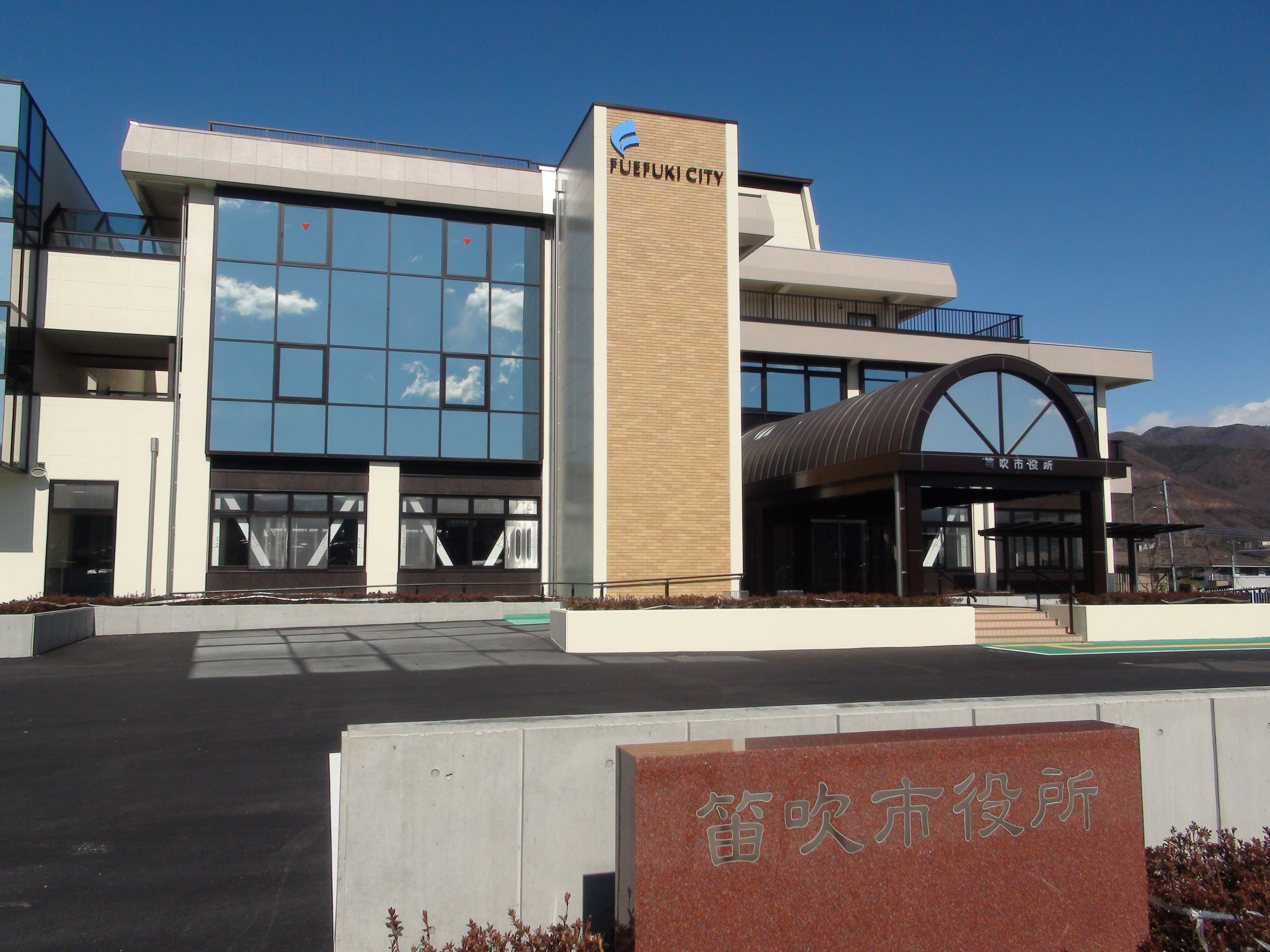
- Fuefuki City Hall

- Flag Seal
- Interactive map of Fuefuki
- Coordinates: 35°38′50.3″N 138°38′23″E
- Country: Japan
- Region: Chūbu (Tōkai)
- Prefecture: Yamanashi Prefecture
- First official recorded: 35 AD (official)
- Isawa town settled: August 10, 1903
- Kasugaichi town settled: October 1, 1969
- Both town merged and city settled: October 12, 2004

Government
  - Mayor: Masaki Yamashita (since November 2016)

Area
  - Total: 201.92 km^{2} (77.96 sq mi)

Population (October 1, 2025)
  - Total: 64,272
  - Density: 318.30/km^{2} (824.40/sq mi)
- Time zone: UTC+9 (Japan Standard Time)
- Symbols
  - Tree: Peach
  - Flower: Rose
  - Bird: Blue-and-white flycatcher
- Address: 777 Ichibu, Isawa-chō, Fuefuki-shi, Yamanashi-ken 406-8510
- Website: Official website

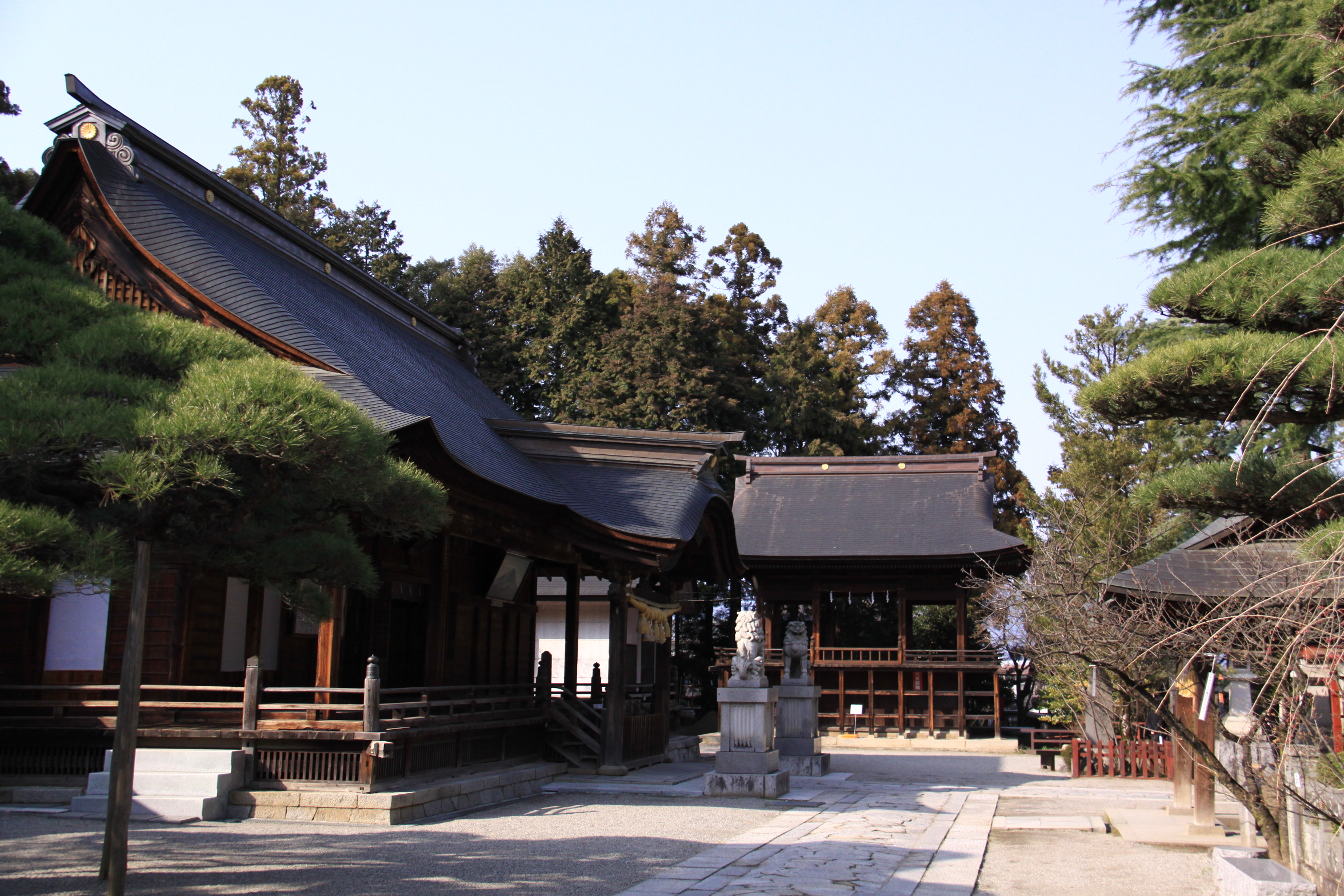
Ichinomiya Asama Shrine

Fuefuki (笛吹市, Fuefuki-shi) is a city in Yamanashi Prefecture, Japan. As of 1 October 2025, the city had an estimated population of 64,272 in 30,408 households, and a population density of 318.30 persons per km^{2}. The total area of the city is 201.92 square kilometres (77.96 sq mi).

== Geography ==
Fuefuki is located in central Yamanashi Prefecture at an average altitude of 261 meters. Just over 58% of the area of the city is covered in forest. The Fuefuki River flows through the city.

=== Neighboring municipalities ===
The following municipalities surrounding the city clockwise starting from Kōfu.

- Fuji-kawaguchiko, Minamitsuru District
- Kōfu
- Kōshū
- Ōtsuki
- Yamanashi

=== Climate ===
The city has a climate characterized by hot and humid summers, and relatively mild winters (Köppen climate classification Cfa). The average annual temperature in Fuefuki is 10.7 °C. The average annual rainfall is 1524 mm with September as the wettest month. The temperatures are highest on average in August, at around 22.8 °C, and lowest in January, at around -1.0 °C.

== Demographics ==
Per Japanese census data, the population of Fuefuki peaked around the year 2000 and has declined since.

Historical population
Year	Pop.	±%
1940	49,960	—
1950	61,882	+23.9%
1960	53,064	−14.2%
1970	50,380	−5.1%
1980	55,950	+11.1%
1990	62,322	+11.4%
1995	66,839	+7.2%
2000	71,025	+6.3%
2005	71,711	+1.0%
2010	70,529	−1.6%
2015	69,559	−1.4%
2020	66,947	−3.8%
2025	64,272	−4.0%

== History ==
Fuefuki was the center of ancient Kai Province and contains many burial mounds from the Kofun period. The ruins of the Kai Kokubun-ji, the Nara period provincial temple are also found within the city limits, as is the Ichinomiya Asama Shrine, the ichinomiya of Kai Province. During the Edo period, all of Kai Province was tenryō territory under direct control of the Tokugawa shogunate, with a daikansho based at the village of Isawa. During the cadastral reform of the early Meiji period on April 1, 1889, the rural districts of Higashiyatsushiro and Higashiyamanashi Districts were formed.

The modern city of Fuefuki was established on October 12, 2004, from the merger of the towns of Ichinomiya, Isawa, Misaka and Yatsushiro, the village of Sakaigawa (all from Higashiyatsushiro District), and the town of Kasugai (from Higashiyamanashi District). The name refers to the Fuefuki River that flows through the city. The city hall is located at the former Isawa Town Hall, and other former towns and village halls were converted to satellite offices.

On August 1, 2006, Fuefuki later absorbed the village of Ashigawa (also from Higashiyatsushiro District. Higashiyatsushiro District was dissolved as a result of this merger.

== Government ==
Fuefuki has a mayor-council form of government with a directly elected mayor and a unicameral city legislature of 19 members.

== Economy ==
The economy of Fuefuki is based on agriculture (horticulture), seasonal tourism and the production of wine. Fuefuki is the largest producer of grapes and peaches in Japan.

== Education ==
Fuefuki has 14 public elementary schools and five public junior high schools operated by the city government, and one public high school operated by the Yamanashi Prefectural Board of Education.

Elementary Schools:

1. Isawa Minami (South) 石和南
2. Isawa Higashi (East) 石和東
3. Isawa Kita (North) 石和北
4. Fujimi 富士見
5. Isawa Nishi (West) 石和西
6. Misaka Higashi (East) 御坂東
7. Misaka Nishi (West) 御坂西
8. Ichinomiya Nishi (West) 一宮西
9. Ichinomiya Minami (South) 一宮南
10. Ichinomiya Kita (North) 一宮北
11. Yatsushiro 八代
12. Sakaigawa 境川
13. Kasugai 春日居
14. Ashigawa 芦川

Junior High Schools:

1. Isawa 石和
2. Misaka 御坂
3. Ichinomiya 一宮
4. Asakawa 浅川
5. Kasugai 春日居

High School:

1. Fuefuki 笛吹

== Gallery ==
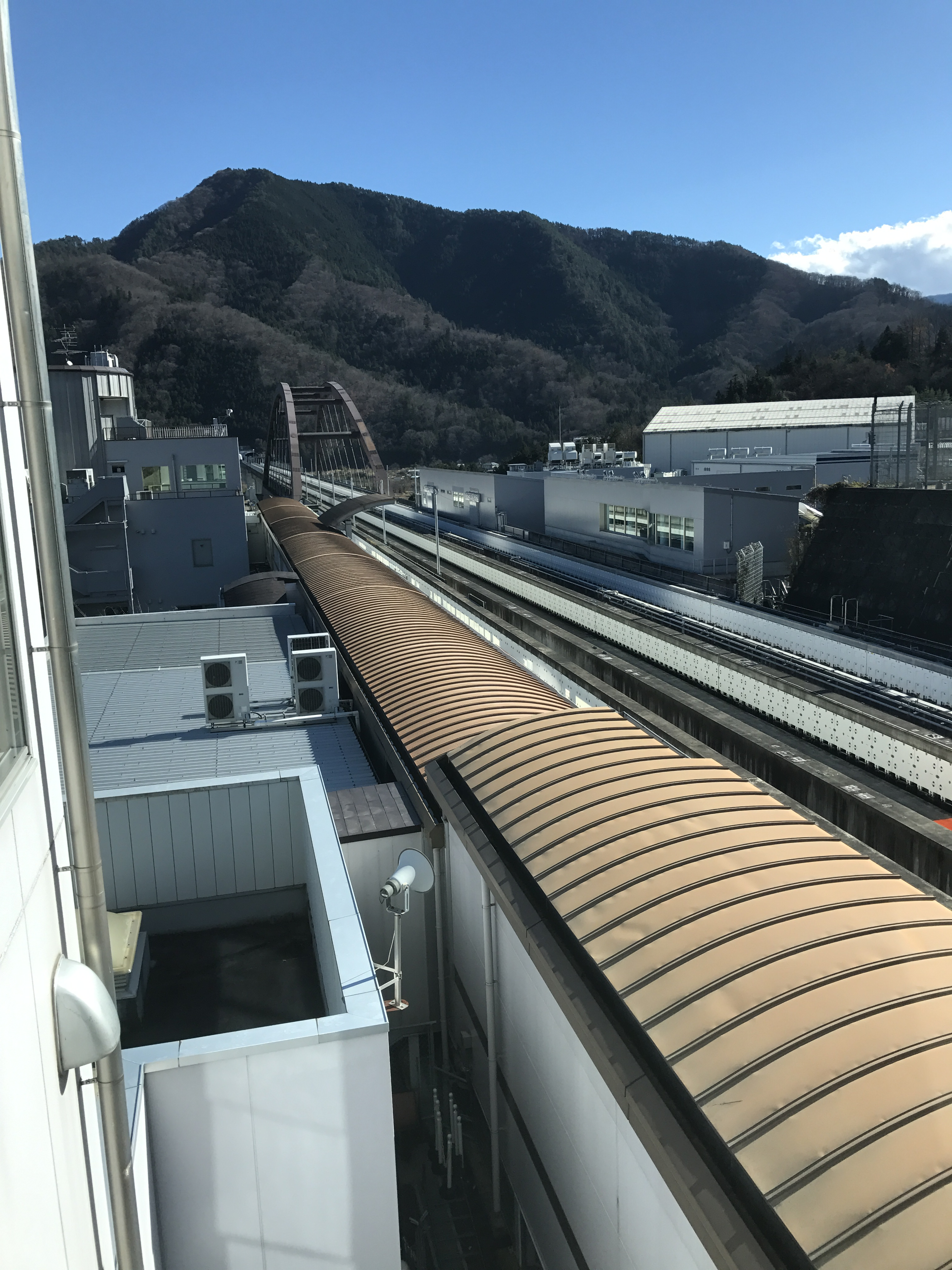
A maglev train test run center and Maglev Exhibition Center

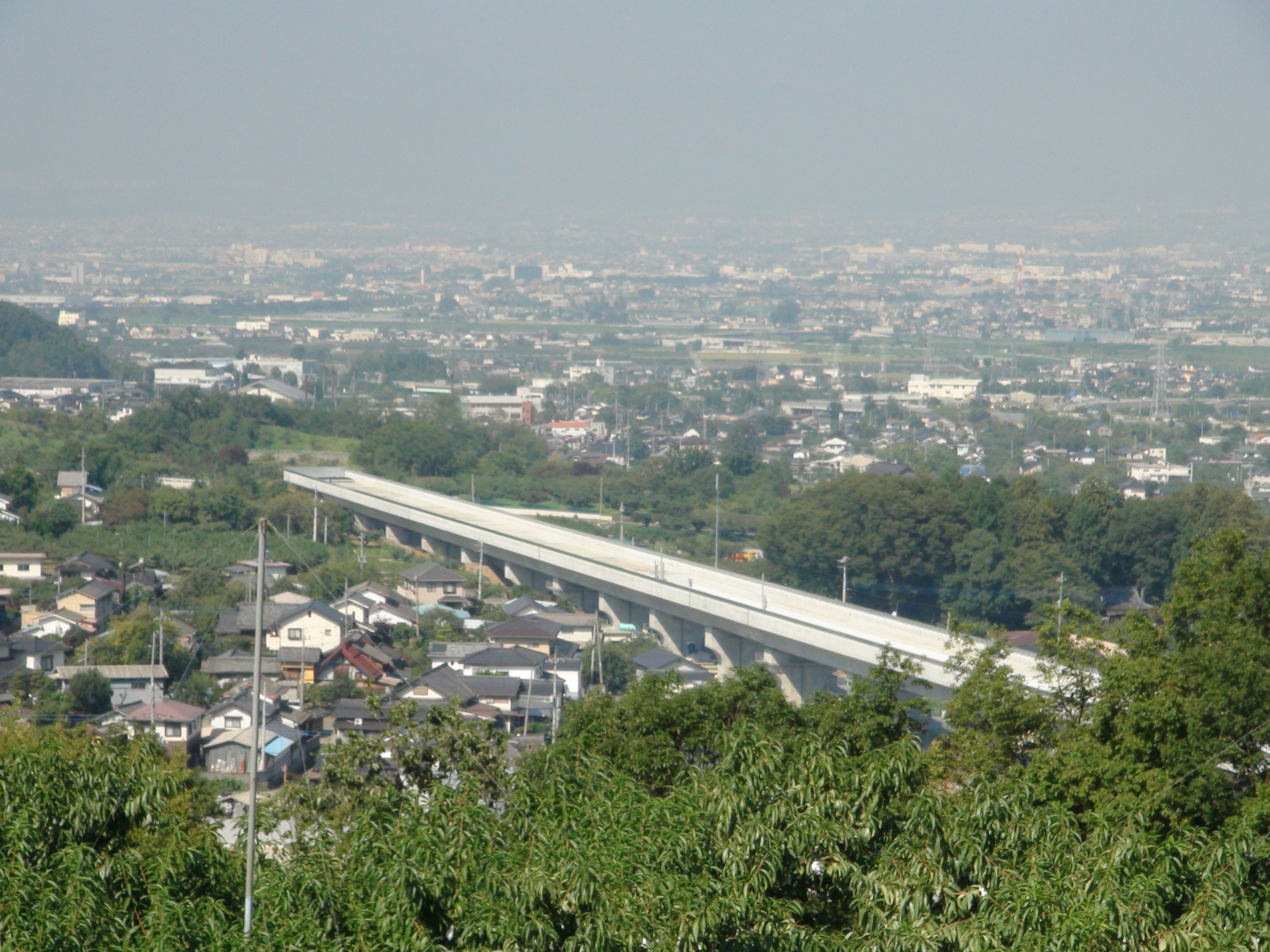
Panorama view of Fuefuki and Maglev train test run exhibition

== Transportation ==
=== Railway ===
- East Japan Railway Company - Chūō Main Line
  - Isawa-onsen - Kasugaichō

=== Highways ===
- Chūō Expressway
- National Route 20
- National Route 137
- National Route 140
- National Route 358
- National Route 411

== Sister cities ==
- (Japan) Tateyama, Chiba, since May 1973 with former Isawa Town
- (Japan) Fujikawaguchiko, Yamanashi, since July 1962 with former Misaka Town
- (Japan) Ichinomiya, Chiba, since April 1982 with former Ichinomiya Town
- (Japan) Yui, Shizuoka, since April 1989 with former Yatsushiro Town
- (Japan) Tainai, Niigata, since October 1996 with former Sakaigawa Village
- (Japan) Sado, Niigata, since October 1989 with former Kasugai Town
- Bad Mergentheim, Baden-Württemberg, Germany, since 1991 with former Isawa Town
- Nuits-Saint-Georges, Côte-d'Or, France, since 1992 with former Ichinomiya Town
- Feicheng, Shandong, China, since 1994 with former Ichinomiya Town

== Local attractions ==
- Yamanashi Prefectural Museum
- The Shakado Museum of Jomon Culture

== Notable people from Fuefuki ==
- Dakotsu Iida, haiku poet
