= Higashiyatsushiro District, Yamanashi =

Former district in Yamanashi prefecture, Japan

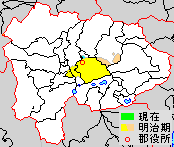
Map showing original extent of Higashiyatushiro District in Yamanashi Prefecture: * yellow - areas formerly within the district borders during the early Meiji period

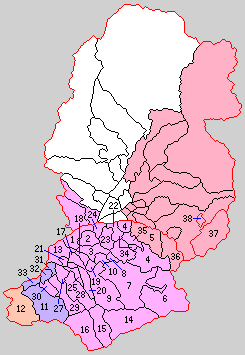
Colored areas are in this district.

Higashiyatsushiro (東八代郡, Higashiyatsushiro-gun) was a district located in Yamanashi Prefecture, Japan.

As of March 2006, the district has an estimated population of 513 with a density of 13.80 persons per km^{2}. The total area is 37.15 km^{2}.

== Municipalities ==
Prior to its dissolution, the district consisted of only one village:

- Ashigawa (Note: Classified as a village.)

== History ==
=== District Timeline ===
- 1878 - The district was founded after Yatsushiro District was split into Higashiyatsushiro and Nishiyatsushiro Districts.

=== Recent mergers ===
- On October 12, 2004 - The towns of Ichinomiya, Isawa, Misaka and Yatsushiro, and the village of Sakaigawa were merged with the town of Kasugai (from Higashiyamanashi District) to form the city of Fuefuki.
- On February 20, 2006 - The village of Toyotomi was merged with the towns of Tamaho and Tatomi (both from Nakakoma District) to form the city of Chūō.
- On March 1, 2006 - The town of Nakamichi was merged into the expanded city of Kōfu.
- On August 1, 2006 - The village of Ashigawa was merged into the expanded city of Fuefuki. Higashiyatsushiro District was dissolved as a result of this merger.

== See also ==
- List of dissolved districts of Japan
