= Nishiyatsushiro District, Yamanashi =

District in Yamanashi Prefecture, Japan

Coordinates: 35.5412°N 138.511°E

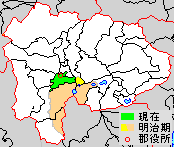
Map showing original extent of Nishiyatsushiro District in Yamanashi Prefecture: * yellow - areas formerly within the district borders during the early Meiji period * green - current borders: 1. Ichikawamisato-machi

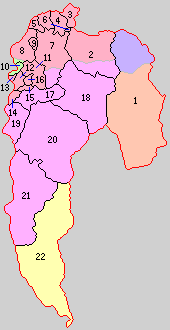
Colored areas are in this district.

Nishiyatsushiro (西八代郡, Nishiyatsushiro-gun) is a district located in Yamanashi Prefecture, Japan.

As of October 1, 2020, the district has an estimated population of 14,700 and a density of 195.5 persons per km^{2}. The total area is 75.18 km^{2}.

== Municipalities ==
The district consists of one town:

- Ichikawamisato (Note: Classified as a town.)

== History ==
Before the massive mergers of the Showa era, the east shore of Fujigawa belonged to Nishiyatsushiro District, and the west shore belonged to Minamikoma District.

The district used to have the area of the east shore of Fujikawa, but due to these mergers, the district is now merely the town of Ichikawamisato.

=== District Timeline ===
- 1878 - The district was founded after Yatsushiro District was split into Higashiyatsushiro and Nishiyatsushiro Districts.
- On February 11, 1955 - The town of Okawauchi was merged with the former town of Minobu (from Minamikoma District) and 3 towns to form the new town of Minobu (in Minamikoma District).
- On April 1, 1955 - The village of Sakae was merged with the village of Akatsukisawa (from Minamikoma District) to form the town of Nambu (in Minamikoma District).
- On September 30, 1956 - Parts of the village of Daido were merged into the town of Ajisawa (in Minamikoma District).
- On January 1, 1958 - Parts of the town of Ichikawadaimon were merged into the town of Ajisawa.
- On April 1, 1958 - Parts of the town of Shimobe were merged into the town of Nakatomi (in Minamikoma District). Nishiyatsushiro District started to eat more areas by Minamikoma District.

=== Recent mergers ===
- On September 13, 2004 - The town of Shimobe merged with the towns of Minobu (former) and Nakatomi (both from Minamikoma District) to form the new and expanded town of Minobu (in Minamikoma District).
- On October 1, 2005 - The towns of Ichikawadaimon, Mitama and Rokugō were merged to form the new town of Ichikawamisato.
- On March 1, 2006:
  - The northern part of Kamikuishiki (the sections of Furuseki and Kakehashi) was merged into the expanded city of Kōfu.
  - The southern part of Kamikuishiki (the sections of Fujigane, Motosu and Shoji) was merged into the expanded town of Fujikawaguchiko (in Minamitsuru District).
