= Manjumori Kofun =

Kofun period burial mound in Yamanashi, Japan

- 万寿森古墳 (Japanese)
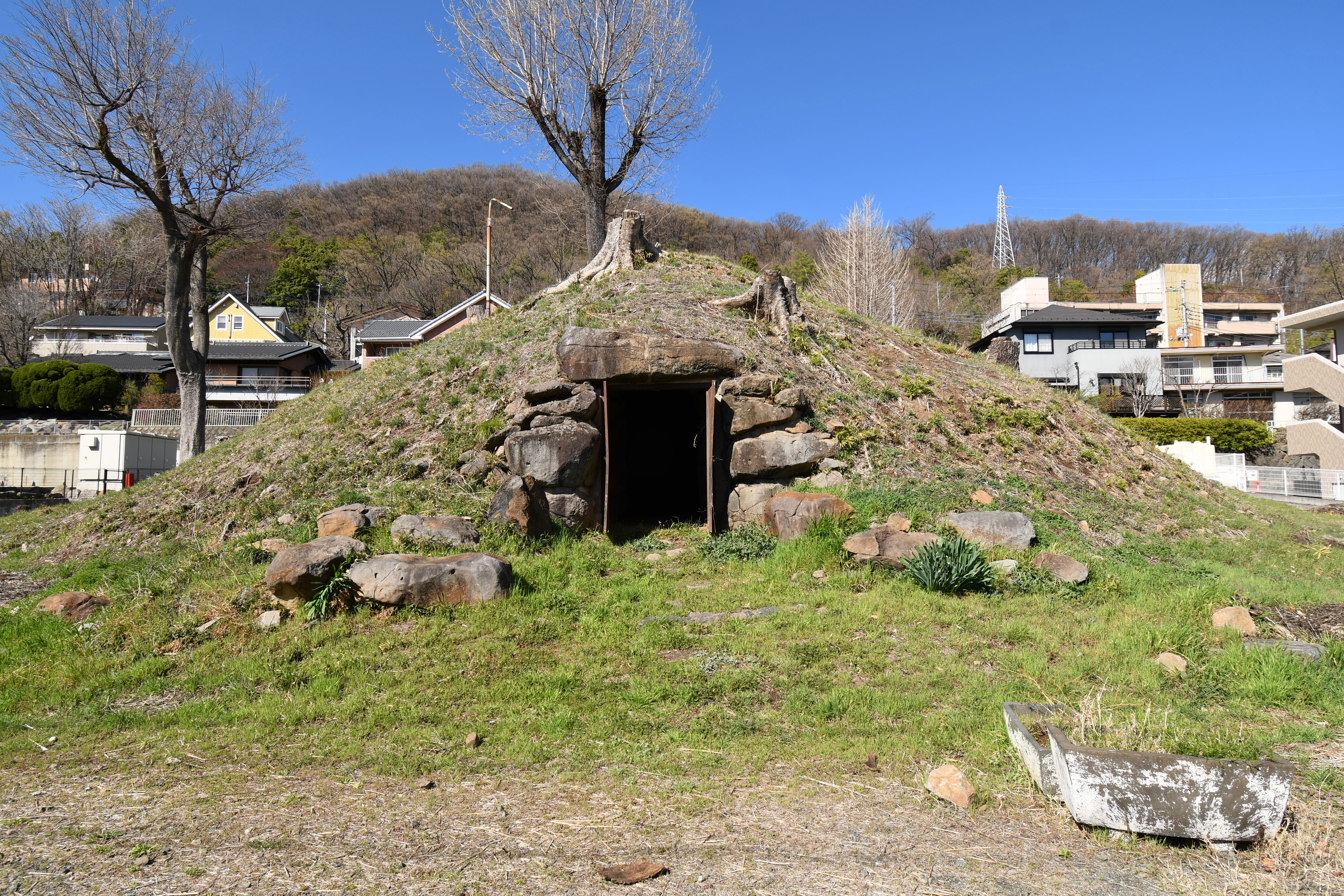
- Manjumori Kofun

- Manjumori Kofun Manjumori Kofun (Japan)
- 35°40′50.0″N 138°33′8.4″E
- Type: Kofun
- Periods: Kofun period
- Location: 94 Shimoinoue, Misaka-cho, Kofu, Yamanashi, Japan
- Region: Tōkai region

History
- Built: mid 6th century

Site notes
- Public access: Yes (no facilities)
- Yamanashi Prefecture Historic Site

Manjumori Kofun (万寿森古墳) is a Kofun period burial mound, located in the Yumura neighborhood of the city of Kōfu, Yamanashi in the Tōkai region of Japan. The tumulus was designated a Yamanashi Prefecture Historic Site in 2016.

== Overview ==
The Manjumori Kofun is a large enpun (円墳)-style circular tumulus located on the northern edge of the Kōfu Basin, at the foot of the southern Yumura Mountains at an elevation of approximately 300 meters. The surrounding area has long been known as a region with many ancient burial mounds, as suggested by its name "Senzuka", and the Enokida site in Senzuka contains the traces of a settlement dating from the Yayoi period to the Heian period. The Kamunazuka Kofun, located northwest of the Manjumori Kofun, was constructed in the latter half of the 6th century and is the second largest burial mound in Yamanashi Prefecture, after the Ubazuka Kofun in IFuefuke. The Manjumori Kofun is one of the Yumurayama Kofun cluster, once containing more than ten other burial mounds; however, many of these have disappeared due to urban encroachment.

The Manjumori Kofun measures 31 meters east-west, 38 meters north-south, and is five meters high. No traces of fukiishi revetment stones or haniwa clay figures have been found. It was first excavated during 2006 and 2007, during which traces of a previously unknown moat were discovered. Fragments of Sue ware pottery, characteristic of the second quarter of the 6th century (525-550 AD) or later, were unearthed from the moat, which supports the theory that this tumulus dates to the early to mid-6th century.

The tumulus contains a double-chambered horizontal entry stone burial chamber opening to the south. The total length of the burial chamber is 14.2 meters, with the chamber itself having a length 7.9 meters, and the entrance passage a length of 5.3 meters. The main axis runs north-south. The width of the burial chamber is 2.44 meters near the back wall, 1.61 meters on the side, and 1.55 meters at the entrance to the passage. The four walls of the burial chamber are constructed of 6 to 7 layers of irregularly-shaped andesite stones, each approximately 70-100-cm in size. The height is not precisely known because the floor was later paved with concrete, as described below, but it is estimated to have reached a maximum of 3.3 meters. The Manjumori Kofun has an exceptionally large horizontal burial chamber for its time, and its construction is not typical of the Kinai region, but rather follows the style of some stone chambers found in Nagano and Gunma Prefectures.

According to the late Edo period "Kai no Kuni Shi" ("History of Kai Province"), the Manjumori Kofun has been known since ancient times, and during the Bakumatsu period, the burial chamber was used as a gunpowder storage facility. In modern times, it was used as a warehouse for a nearby hotel, with doors installed in the opening and concrete laid on the floor.

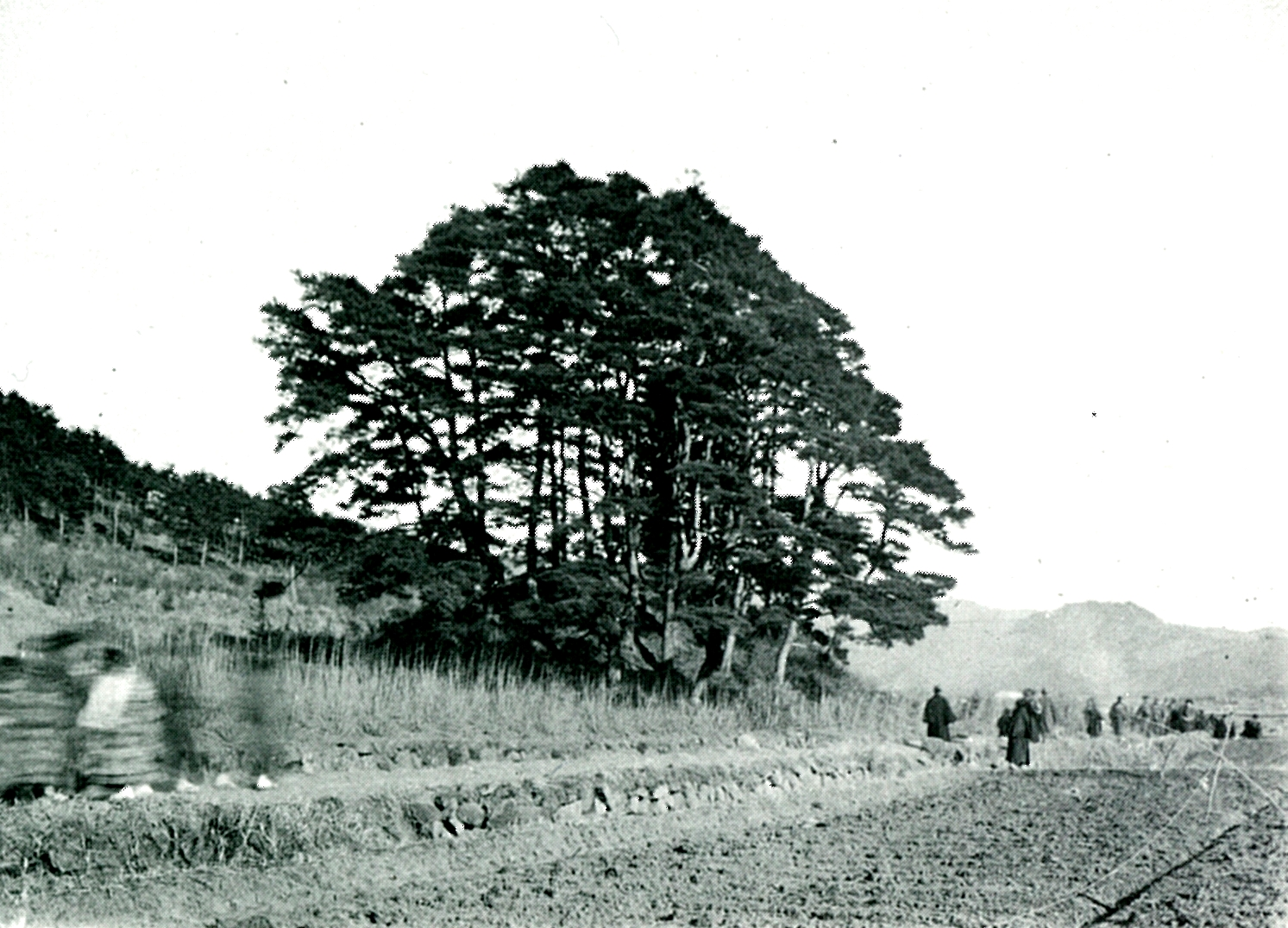
Manjumori Kofun in the 1910s

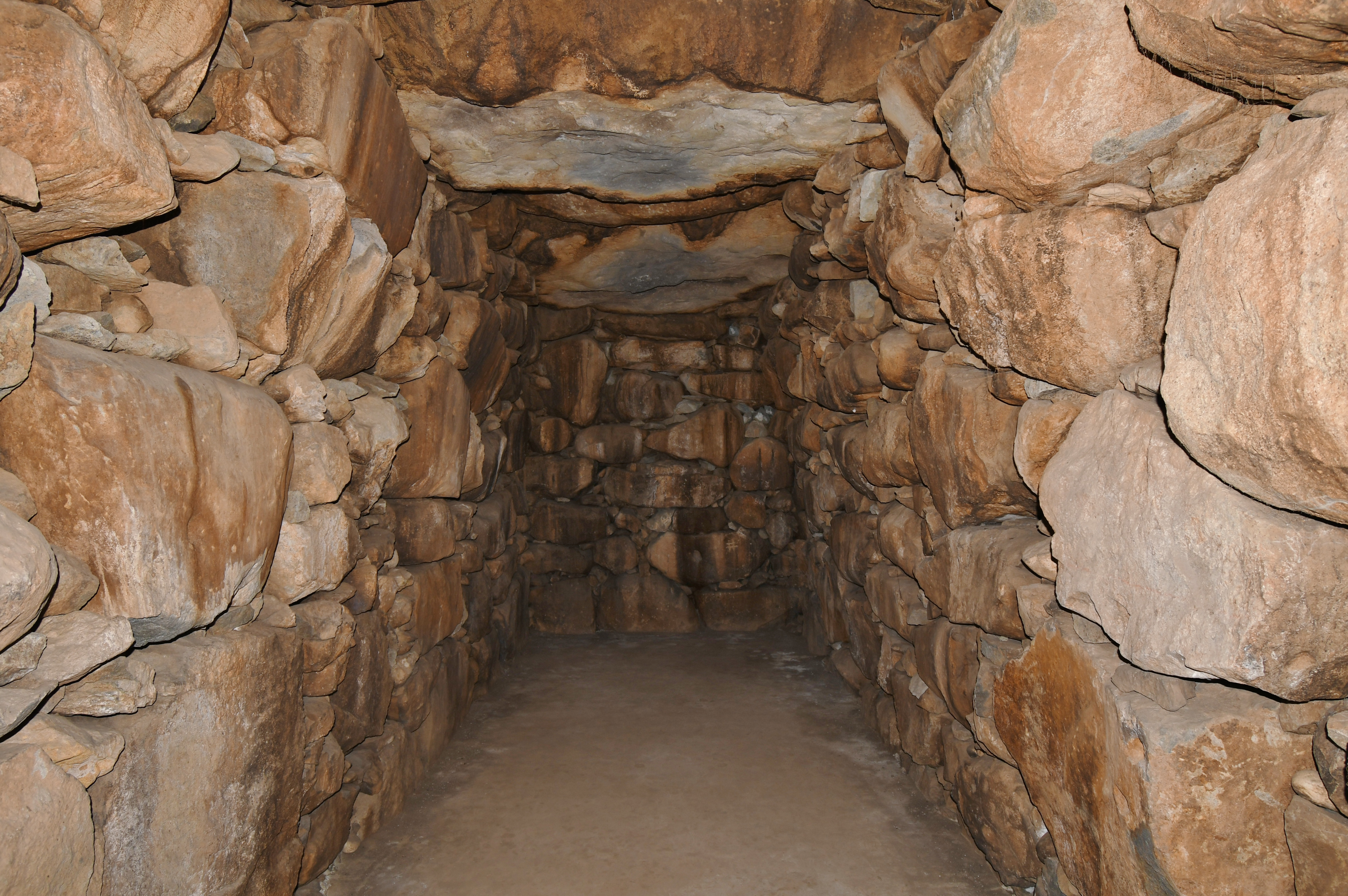
Burial chamber

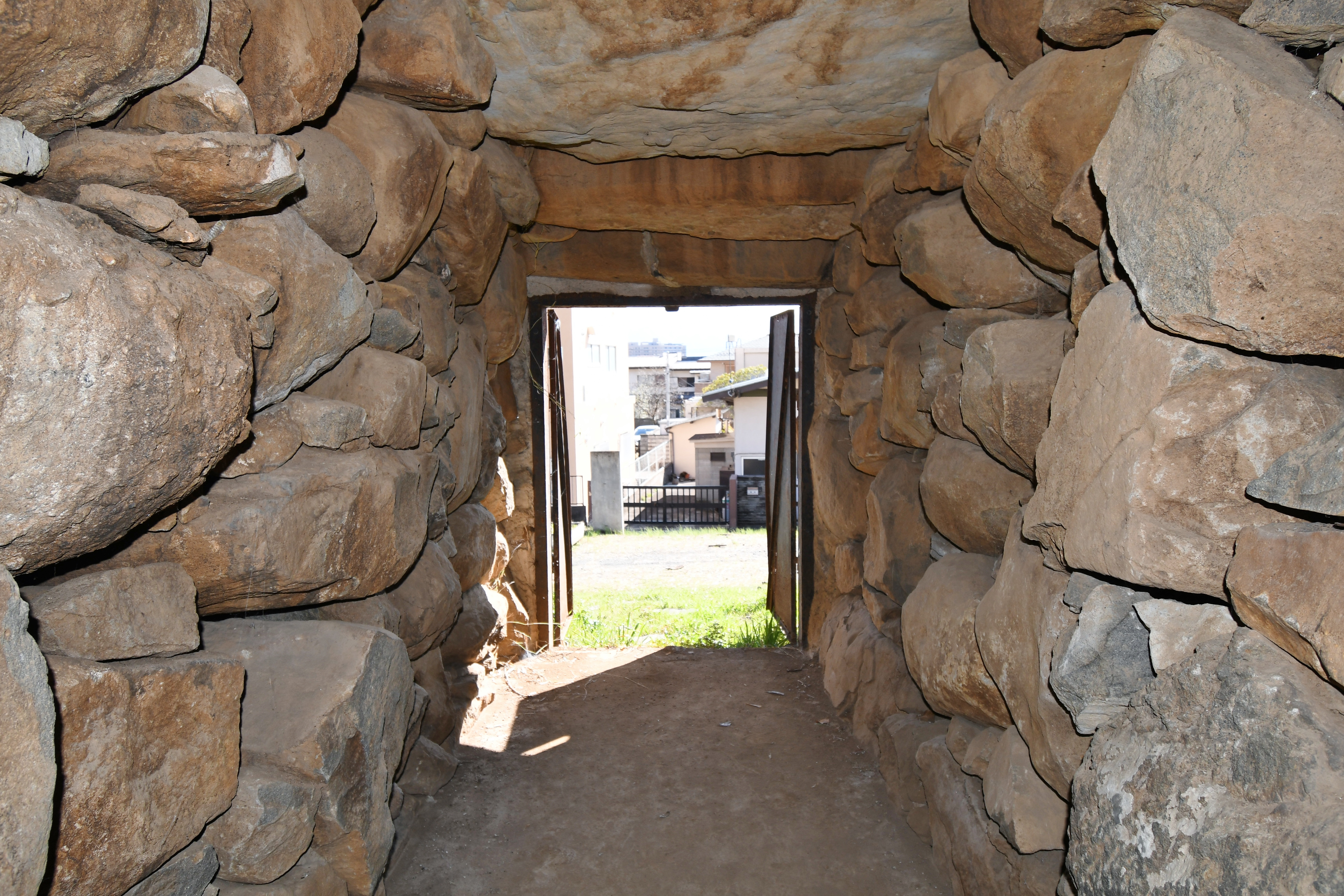
Passageway facing entrance

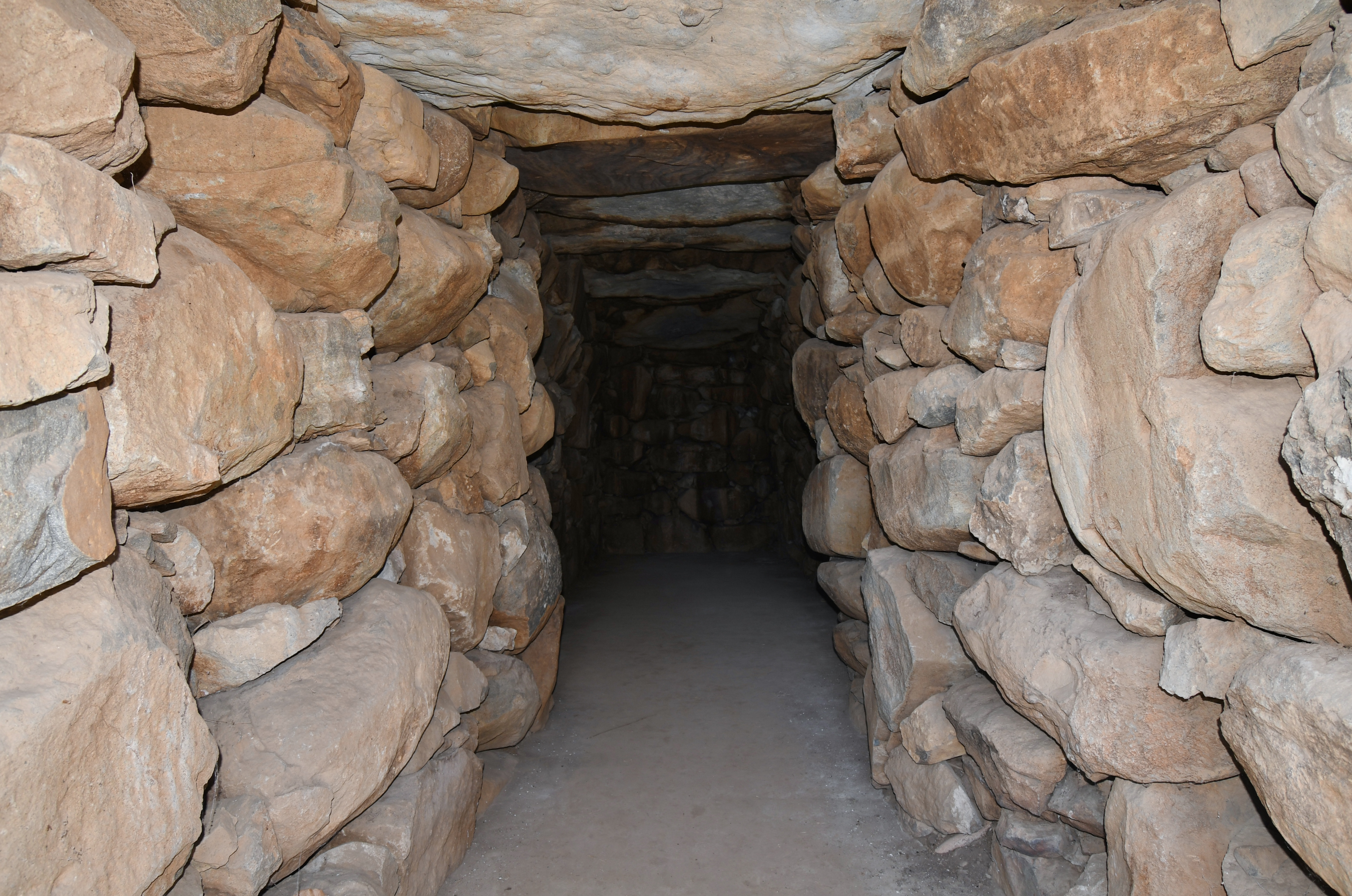
Passageway facing burial chamber

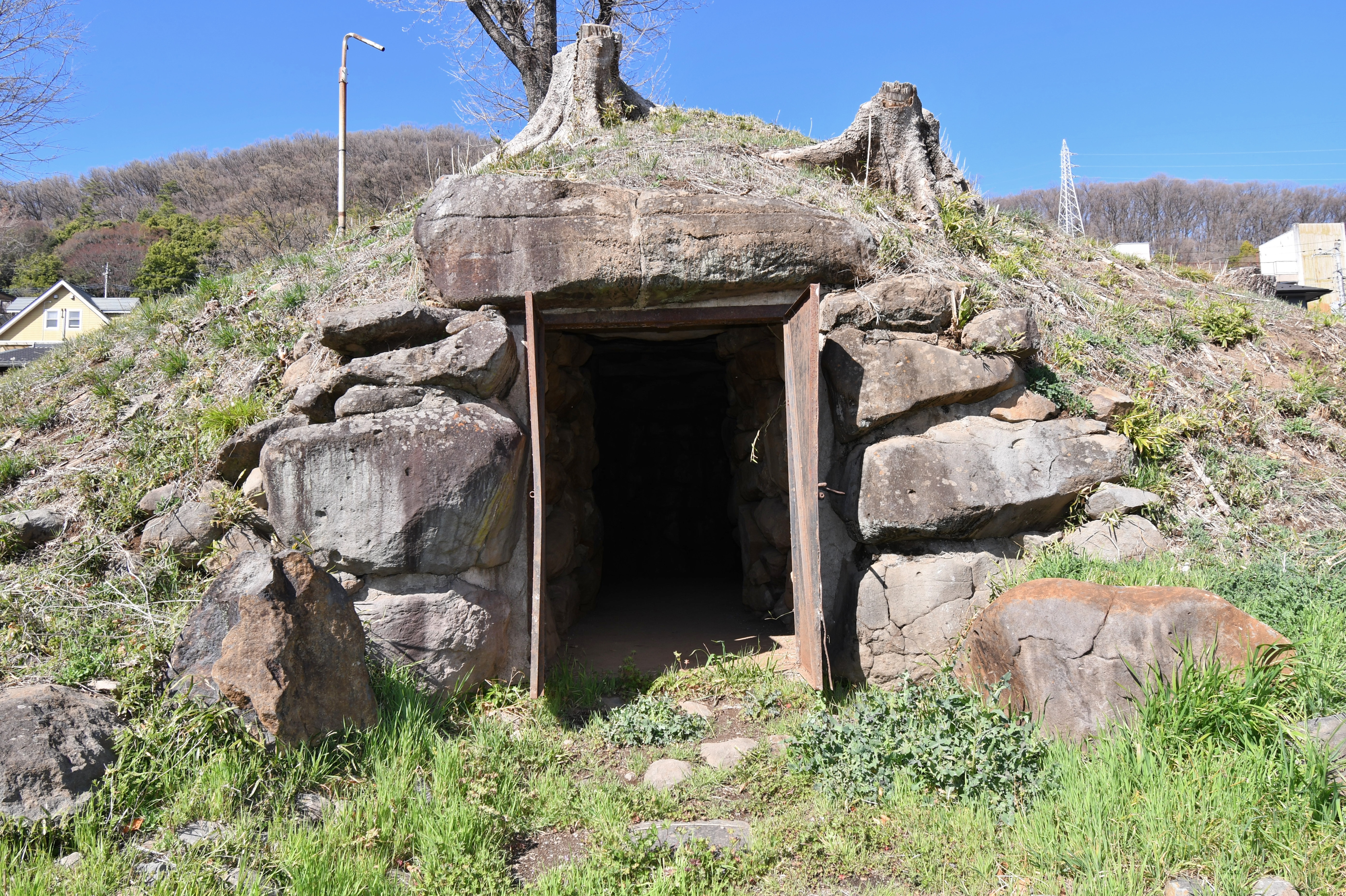
Entry

== See also ==
- List of Historic Sites of Japan (Yamanashi)
