= Ryūzuka Kofun =

Kofun period burial mound in Yamanashi, Japan

- 竜塚古墳 (Japanese)
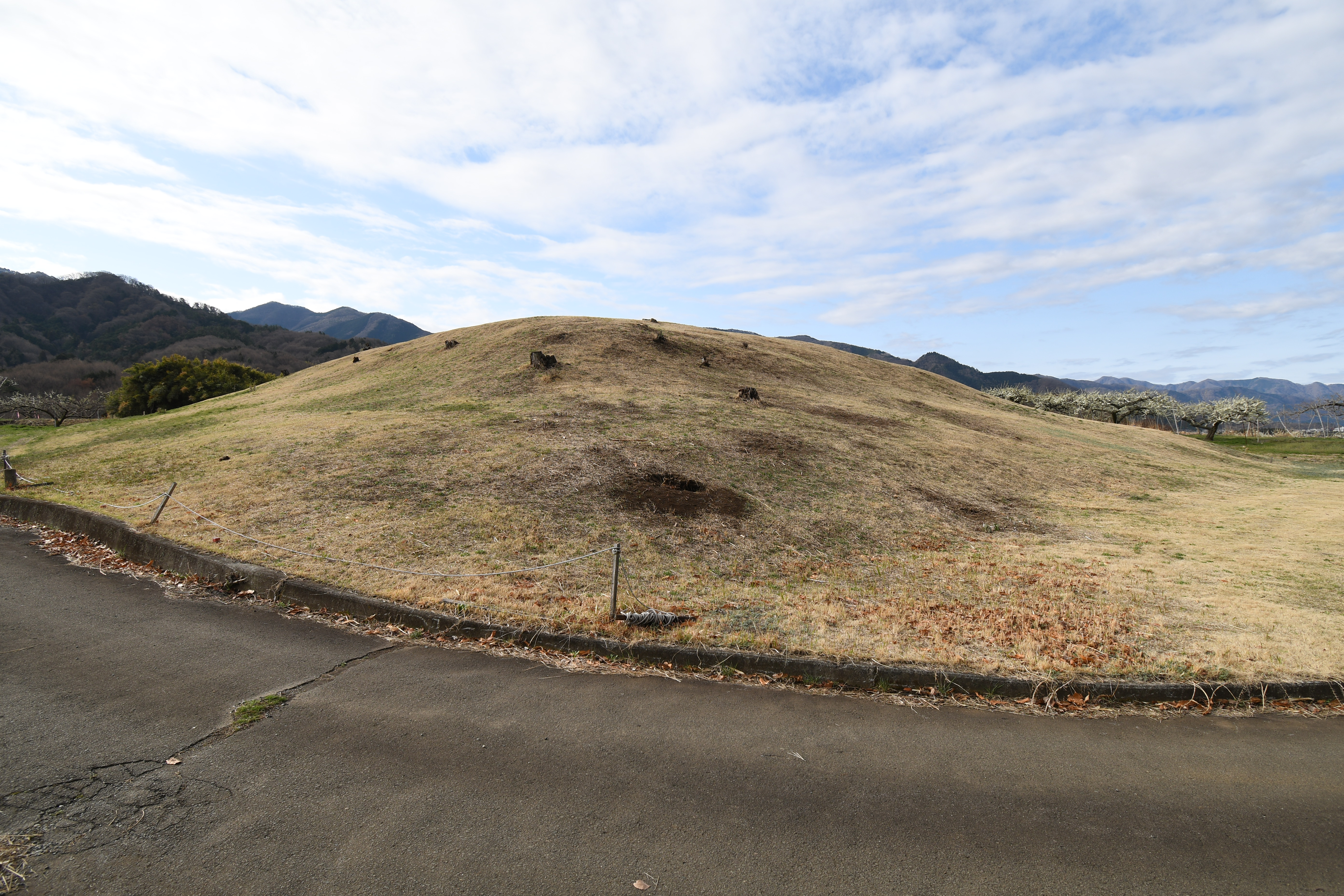
- Ryūzuka Kofun

- Ryūzuka Kofun Ryūzuka Kofun (Japan)
- 35°36′4.6″N 138°38′15.1″E
- Type: Kofun
- Periods: Kofun period
- Location: 2086-51, Yonekura, Yatsushiro-cho, Fuefuki, Yamanashi, Japan
- Region: Tōkai region

History
- Built: early 5th century

Site notes
- Public access: Yes (no facilities)
- Yamanashi Prefecture Historic Site

Ryūzuka Kofun (竜塚古墳) is a Kofun period (early 5th century) burial mound, located in the Yonekura, Yatsushiro-cho neighborhood of Fuefuki, Yamanashi in the Tōkai region of Japan. The tumulus was designated a Yamanashi Prefecture Historic Site in 1979.

== Overview ==
The Ryūzuka Kofun is a hōfun (方墳) square tumulus, with each side approximately 52 meters wide. It has height of 12 meters on the north side and six meters on the south side. The mound was constructed in two tiers, and was faced with fukiishi revetment stones. There are 4.5 meter wide depressions on the edges of the tumulus on three sides (excluding the north side), suggesting that a moat surrounded it. It is one of the largest square tumuli in eastern Japan, it is located at an elevation of 365 meters on the edge of a hill called Ryūanjiyama, on the left bank of the Fuefuki River on the southeastern edge of the Kōfu Basin, in the Sone Hills, an area densely populated with large tumuli. Similar square tumuli in Yamanashi Prefecture are rare, with only the Toriihara Kitsunezuka Kofun in Otsuka, Ichikawamisato, and the Imonoshiya Kofun in Shimoichinose, Minamialps.

As a result of archaeological excavations conducted over four years from 2000 for preservation and maintenance, a middle section approximately three meters wide was found around the middle of the mound's slope. Its burial facility does not utilize a stone burial chamber; partial excavations suggest a vertical shaft approximately 1.5 meters deep was dug in the center of the top of the tumulus, with a wooden coffin placed at its bottom on a clay floor. Excavations also uncovered a Haji ware pedestaled bowl from the mid-5th century, from which the date if the tumulus may be inferred to have been between that of the Kai Chōshizuka Kofun and the Maruyamazuka Kofun.

== See also ==
- List of Historic Sites of Japan (Yamanashi)
