= Ōmaruyama Kofun =

4th century Kofun period tumulus in Japan

- 大丸山古墳 (Japanese)
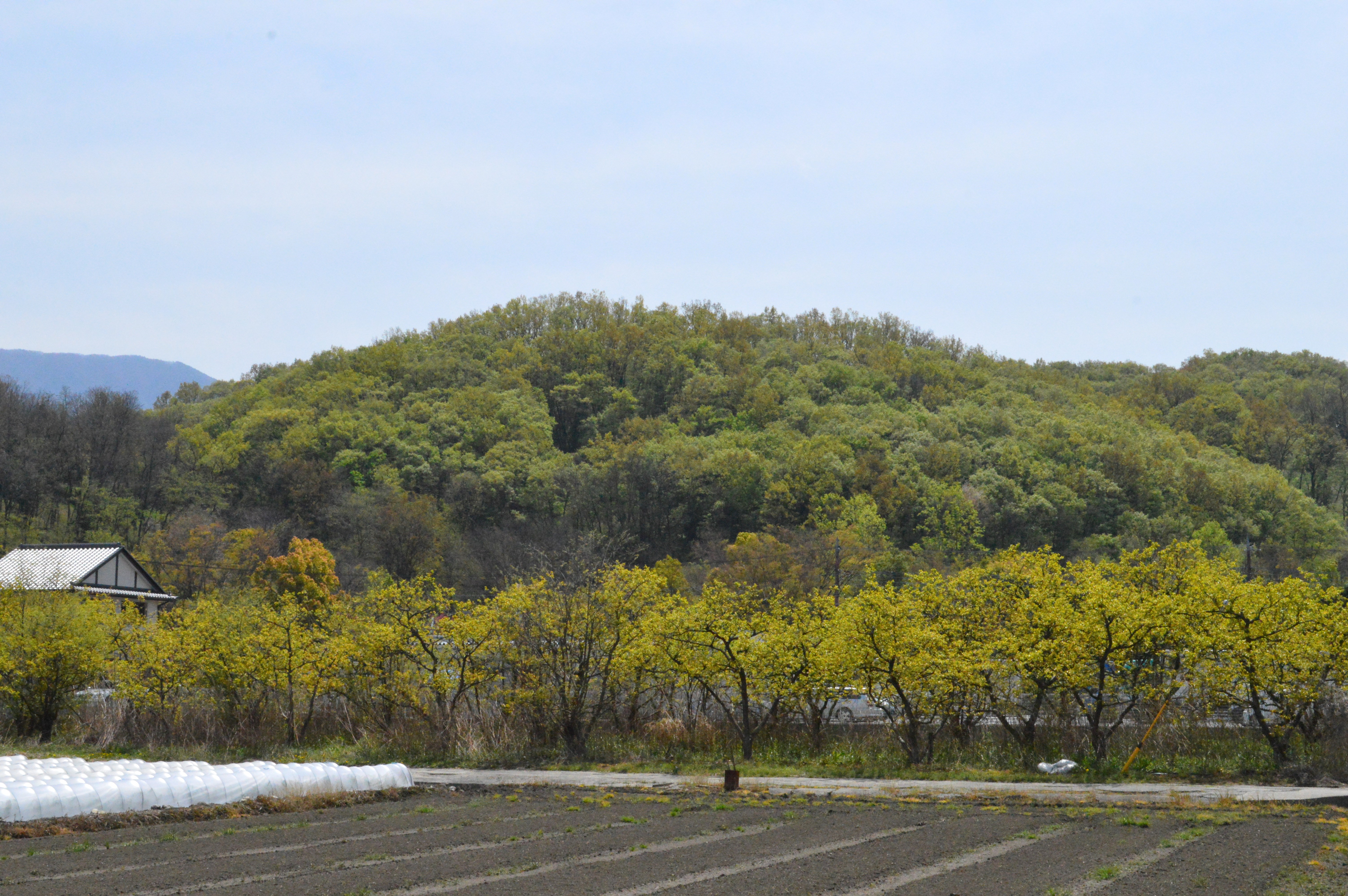

- Ōmaruyama Kofun Ōmaruyama Kofun (Japan)
- 35°35′36″N 138°34′49″E
- Type: Kofun
- Location: Kōfu, Yamanashi, Japan
- Region: Chūbu region

History
- Built: Kofun period

Site notes
- Public access: Yes (no public facilities)

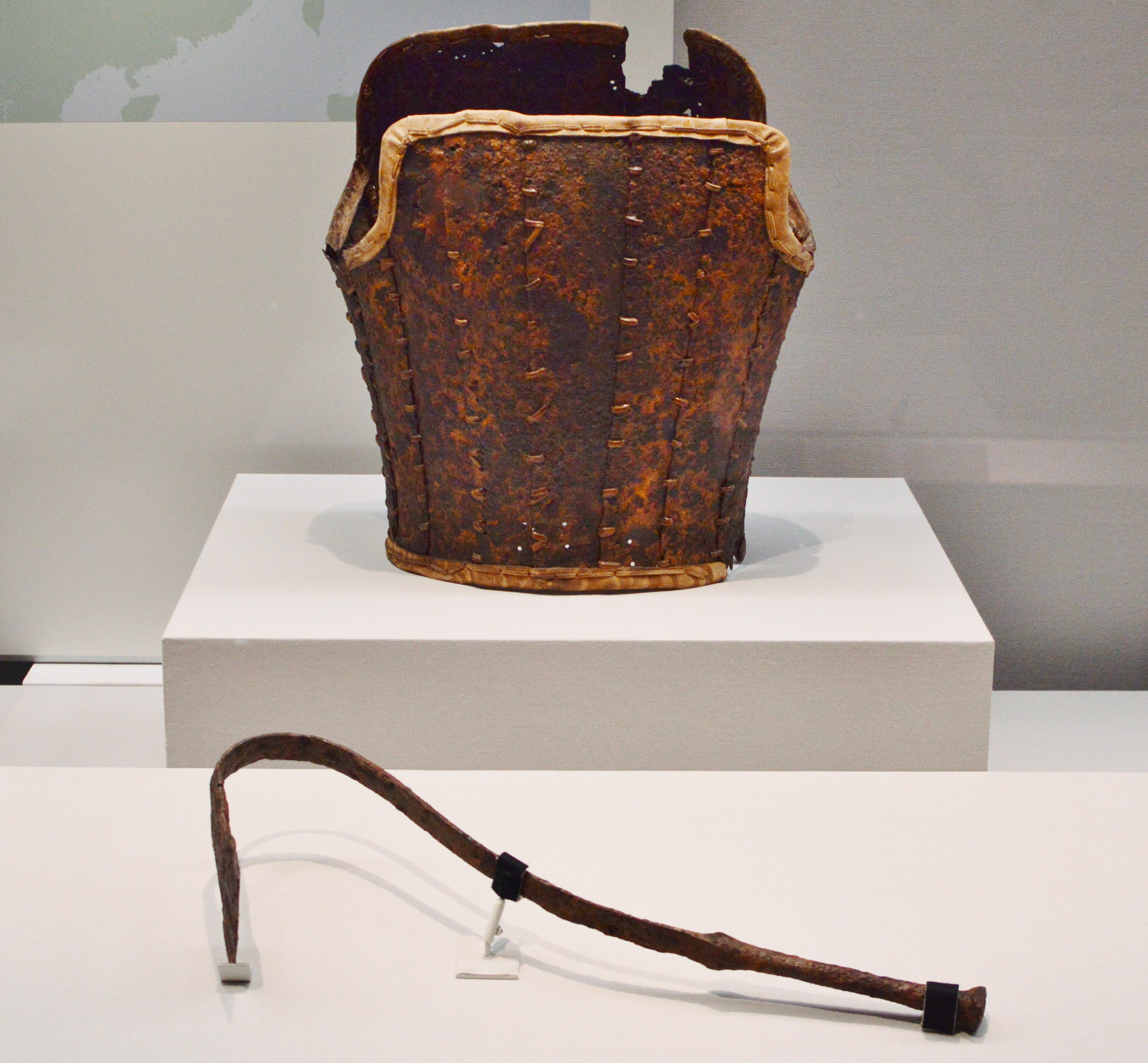
Artifacts from the Ōmaruyama Kofun

The Ōmaruyama Kofun (大丸山古墳) is a 4th century Kofun period tumulus located in the Nakamichi neighborhood of the city of Kōfu, Yamanashi in the Chūbu region of Japan. The tumulus was designated a National Historic Site of Japan in 2013.

== Overview ==
The Ōmaruyama Kofun is located on the southeastern edge of the Kōfu Basin on the ridge of a 310 meter mountain which extends to the left bank of the Fuefuki River. The area has a high concentration of Kofun period remains and is located immediately above the Chōshizuka Kofun - Maruyamazuka Kofun. The Ōmaruyama Kofun was discovered in 1920, and is a zenpō-kōen-fun (前方後円墳), which is shaped like a keyhole, having one square end and one circular end, when viewed from above. It has an overall length of 105 meters, and is aligned in along an east-west axis, taking advantage of the natural topography. The posterior circular portion has a diameter 48 meters, and the anterior rectangular portion has a width of 34 meters. No haniwa or fukiishi have been found.

The site was excavated in 1970 and again in 1976, during which time the burial chamber was uncovered and found to be a peculiar two-tied structure with length of 2.2 meters and width of 0.8 meters. The interior of the sarcophagus was painted in vermillion, and contained the remains of two adult men and women along with many burial goods. These included an almost intact set of armor made from iron plates, iron weapons and swords, agricultural implements, three bronze mirrors, beads and jewelry. One of the bronze mirrors, or Shinju-kyo was of especial interest, as it was identical to mirrors found at the Uchikoshi Kofun in Gifu and the Teradani Chōshizuka Kofun in Iwata, Shizuoka. Many of the excavated artifacts are now preserved at the Tokyo National Museum.

== See also ==
- List of Historic Sites of Japan (Yamanashi)
