= List of historic sites of Japan (Yamanashi) =

This list is of the historic sites of Japan located within the Prefecture of Yamanashi.

== National Historic Sites ==
As of 1 June 2022, sixteen Sites have been designated as being of national significance, including Mount Fuji, which spans the prefectural borders with Shizuoka.

Site	Municipality	Comments	Image	Coordinates	Type	Ref.
Kinsei ruins 金生遺跡; Kinsei iseki	Hokuto	Jōmon period settlement trace		35°50′54″N 138°23′07″E	1	
Midai River embankments 御勅使川旧堤防; Midai gawa kyū-teibō iseki	Nirasaki, Minami-Alps	begun by Takeda Shingen		35°39′13″N 138°25′00″E	6	
Kaikinzan gold mines 甲斐金山遺跡; Kaikinzan iseki	Kōshū, Minobu	the designation includes Kurokawa Kinzan (黒川金山) and Nakayama Kinzan (中山金山); the latter comprises some 124 terrace mines, 16 tunnel mines, and 77 pit mines over an area of 16.4 ha, exploitation being first documented under the Takeda clan in 1571		35°47′20″N 138°50′42″E	6	
Kai Kokubun-ji ruins 甲斐国分寺跡; Kai Kokubunji ato	Fuefuki	provincial temple of Kai Province		35°38′19″N 138°41′01″E	3	
Kai Kokubunni-ji ruins 甲斐国分寺跡; Kai Kokubunniji ato	Fuefuki	provincial nunnery of Kai Province		35°38′36″N 138°41′02″E	3	
Katsunuma clan residence ruins Site 勝沼氏館跡; Katsunuma-shi yakata ato	Kōshū	Sengoku period residence ruins		35°39′32″N 138°44′00″E	2	
Shinpu Castle ruins 新府城跡; Shinpu-jō ato	Nirasaki	Sengoku period castle ruins		35°44′09″N 138°25′31″E	2	
Yato Castle ruins 谷戸城跡; Yato-jō ato	Ōizumi	Heian period castle ruins		35°51′25″N 138°23′10″E	2	
Chōshizuka Kofun & Maruyamazuka Kofun 銚子塚古墳附丸山塚古墳; Chōshizuka kofun tsuketari Maruyamazuka kofun	Kōfu	Kofun period tumuli		35°35′33″N 138°34′45″E	1	
Hakusan Castle ruins 白山城跡; Hakusan-jō ato	Nirasaki	Heian period castle ruins		35°42′04″N 138°25′21″E	2	
Tsutsujigasaki Castle 武田氏館跡; Tsutsujigasaki yakata ato	Kōfu	Sengoku period castle ruins		35°41′12″N 138°34′39″E	2	
Mount Yōgai 要害山; Yōgaizan	Kōfu	Sengoku period castle ruins		35°42′11″N 138°35′54″E	2	
Ōmaruyama Kofun 大丸山古墳; Ōmaruyama kofun	Kōfu	Kofun period tumuli		35°35′36″N 138°34′49″E	1	
Umenoki ruins 梅之木遺跡; Umenoki iseki	Hokuto	Jōmon period settlement trace		35°47′22″N 138°27′48″E	2	
Mount Fuji 富士山; Fujisan	Fujiyoshida, Fujikawaguchiko, Narusawa	the designation includes areas of three municipalities in Shizuoka Prefecture; Mount Fuji is also a Special Place of Scenic Beauty and has been inscribed on the World Heritage List as a Cultural (rather than Natural) Site		35°30′36″N 138°44′46″E	3	
Kōfu Castle ruins 甲府城跡; Kōfu-jō ato	Kōfu	Edo Period castle ruins		35°39′55″N 138°34′17″E		

== Prefectural Historic Sites ==
As of 16 March 2026, twenty-nine Sites have been designated as being of prefectural importance.

Site	Municipality	Comments	Image	Coordinates	Type	Ref.
Takeda Nobutora Grave 武田信虎の墓; Takeda Nobutora no haka	Kōfu	at Daisen-ji (大泉寺)		35°40′37″N 138°34′51″E		for all refs see
Grave of Lady Sanjō 武田晴信室三条氏墓; Takeda Harunobu no bushitsu Sanjō-shi no haka	Kōfu	Sengoku period grave at Enkō-in (円光院)		35°40′58″N 138°35′14″E		
Kamunazuka Kofun 加牟那塚; Kamunazuka Kofun	Kōfu			35°41′05″N 138°32′37″E		
Takeda Shingen Grave 武田晴信の墓; Takeda Harunobu no haka	Kōshū	at Erin-ji		35°43′48″N 138°42′50″E		
Ozo Yashiki 於曽屋敷; Ozo yashiki	Kōshū			35°42′11″N 138°43′56″E		
Katsuyama Castle ruins 勝山城跡; Katsuyama-jō ato	Tsuru			35°33′16″N 138°54′14″E		
Renpō Yashiki 連方屋敷; Renpō yashiki	Yamanashi			35°41′36″N 138°42′17″E		
Iwatono Castle ruins 岩殿城跡; Iwatono-jō ato	Ōtsuki			35°37′18″N 138°57′00″E		
Monomizuka Kofun 物見塚古墳; Monomizuka kofun	Minami-Alps			35°35′59″N 138°27′19″E		
Kochōzen-ji 古長禅寺; Kochōzenji	Minami-Alps			35°35′47″N 138°28′13″E		
Takeda Katsuyori Grave 武田勝頼の墓; Takeda Katsuyori no haka	Kōshū	at Keitoku-in (景徳院)		35°38′28″N 138°48′13″E		
Keitoku-in Precincts 景徳院境内; Keitokuin keidai	Kōshū			35°38′28″N 138°48′12″E		
Hatta Family Residence 八田家御朱印屋敷; Hatta-ke goshuin yashiki	Fuefuki			35°39′15″N 138°38′28″E		
Ubazuka Kofun 姥塚古墳; Ubazuka kofun	Fuefuki			35°38′05″N 138°39′30″E		
Kyōzuka Kofun 経塚古墳; Kyōzuka kofun	Fuefuki			35°38′20″N 138°40′39″E		
Oka Chōshizuka Kofun 岡銚子塚古墳; Oka Chōshizuka kofun	Fuefuki			35°36′01″N 138°38′39″E		
Teramoto Haiji ruins 寺本廃寺跡; Teramoto Haiji iseki	Fuefuki			35°39′54″N 138°39′18″E		
Ryūzuka Kofun 竜塚古墳; Ryūzuka kofun	Fuefuki			35°36′04″N 138°38′15″E		
Ōtsuka Kofun 大塚古墳; Ōtsuka kofun	Ichikawamisato			35°34′29″N 138°32′22″E		
Nichiren Hermitage Site 日蓮上人草庵跡; Nichiren shōnin sōan ato	Minobu	at Kuon-ji		35°22′55″N 138°25′29″E		
Majino Castle ruins 真篠城跡; Majino-jō ato	Nanbu			35°15′09″N 138°28′34″E		
Nakamagizuka Kofun 中秣塚古墳; Nakamagizuka kofun	Kai			35°40′31″N 138°30′14″E		
Tengusawa Tile Kiln Site 天狗沢瓦窯跡; Tengusawa gayō ato	Kai			35°41′29″N 138°31′01″E		
Fukakusa Residence Site 深草館跡; Fukakusa kan-seki	Hokuto			35°49′54″N 138°23′08″E		
Koizuka Ichirizuka 恋塚一里塚; Koizuka ichirizuka	Uenohara			35°37′34″N 139°02′03″E		
Yōjuin Grave 徳川家康側室養珠院墓所; Tokugawa Ieyasu sokushitsu Yōjuin bosho	Minobu	Yōjuin (養珠院) was the concubine of Tokugawa Ieyasu; at Honnon-ji (本遠寺)		35°21′45″N 138°26′46″E		
Manjumori Kofun 万寿森古墳; Manjumori kofun	Kōfu			35°40′50″N 138°33′08″E		
Uenotaira Site Tumuli 上の平遺跡の方形周溝墓群; Uenotaira iseki no hōkei shūkō bogun	Kōfu			35°35′06″N 138°34′35″E		
Ōzuka Kofun 王塚古墳; Ōzuka Kofun	Chūō			35°34′46″N 138°33′13″E		

== Municipal Historic Sites ==
As of 1 May 2021, a further one hundred and ninety-six Sites have been designated as being of municipal importance.

== Registered Historic Sites ==
As of 17 June 2022, one Monument has been registered (as opposed to designated) as an Historic Site at a national level.

Site	Municipality	Comments	Image	Coordinates	Type	Ref.
Tokushima Canal 徳島堰; Tokushima-segi	Nirasaki, Minami-Alps			35°41′43″N 138°26′11″E		

== See also ==
- Cultural Properties of Japan
- Kai Province
- List of Places of Scenic Beauty of Japan (Yamanashi)
- Yamanashi Prefectural Museum
- List of Cultural Properties of Japan - paintings (Yamanashi)
