= Monomizuka Kofun =

Kofun period keyhole-shaped burial mound in Yamanashi, Japan

- 物見塚古墳 (Japanese)
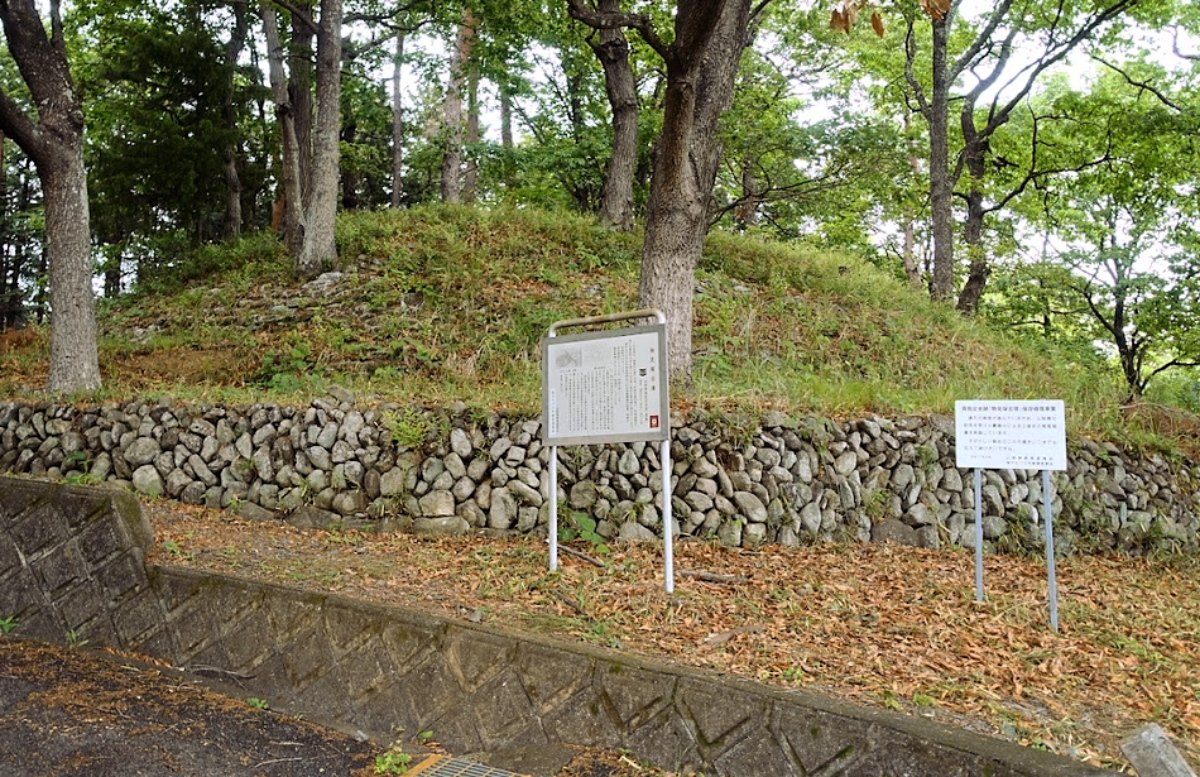
- Monomizuka Kofun

- Monomizuka Kofun Monomizuka Kofun (Japan)
- 35°35′59.1″N 138°27′18.6″E
- Type: Kofun
- Periods: Kofun period
- Location: Shimoichinose, Minami-Alps, Yamanashi, Japan
- Region: Tōkai region

History
- Built: late 4th-early 5th century

Site notes
- Public access: Yes (no facilities)
- Yamanashi Prefecture Historic Site

Monomizuka Kofun (物見塚古墳) is an early-middle Kofun period keyhole-shaped burial mound, located in the Shimoichinose neighborhood of Minami-Alps, Yamanashi in the Tōkai region of Japan. The tumulus was designated a Yamanashi Prefecture Historic Site in 1988.

== Overview ==
The Monomizuka Kofun is a zenpō-kōen-fun (前方後円墳), which is shaped like a keyhole, having one square end and one circular end, when viewed from above. It is located at an elevation of 375 meters on the tip of the Ichinose Plateau, overlooking the Kōfu Basin, It is the only known keyhole-shaped burial mound in this region, although the surrounding area contains several other tumuli, including the Nujinaoka Kofun (a circular burial mound believed to be from the late 5th century), the Imonoshiya Kofun (a 6th-century burial mound), and the Aburata Site, a complex settlement site dating from the Yayoi, Kofun, and Heian periods. Its construction is estimated to have taken place between the late 4th and early 5th centuries.

The tumulus is approximately 46 meters long, with an anterior rectangular section approximately 16 meters long and 14 meters wide, a posterior circular section approximately 30 meters in diameter, and a height of about 4.2 meters. Fukiishi revetment stones have been confirmed on the surface of the mound, but no traces of haniwa or of a moat have been found. The burial facility is presumed to be a clay sarcophagus in a vertical pit in the center of the posterior circular portion. Archaeological excavations were carried out in 1981 and 2005. Grave goods such as three iron swords, one straight sword, jade ornaments, and fragments of Haji ware pottery, and a bronze mirror had been found.

The excavated artifacts are on display at the Minami-Alps City Hometown Culture and Heritage Museum.

Total length
46 meters:
Anterior rectangular portion
14 meters wide
Posterior circular portion
30 meter diameter x 4.2 meters high

== See also ==
- List of Historic Sites of Japan (Yamanashi)
