= Nakamagizuka Kofun =

Kofun period burial mound in Yamanashi, Japan

Nakamakizuka Kofun
- 中秣塚古墳 (Japanese)
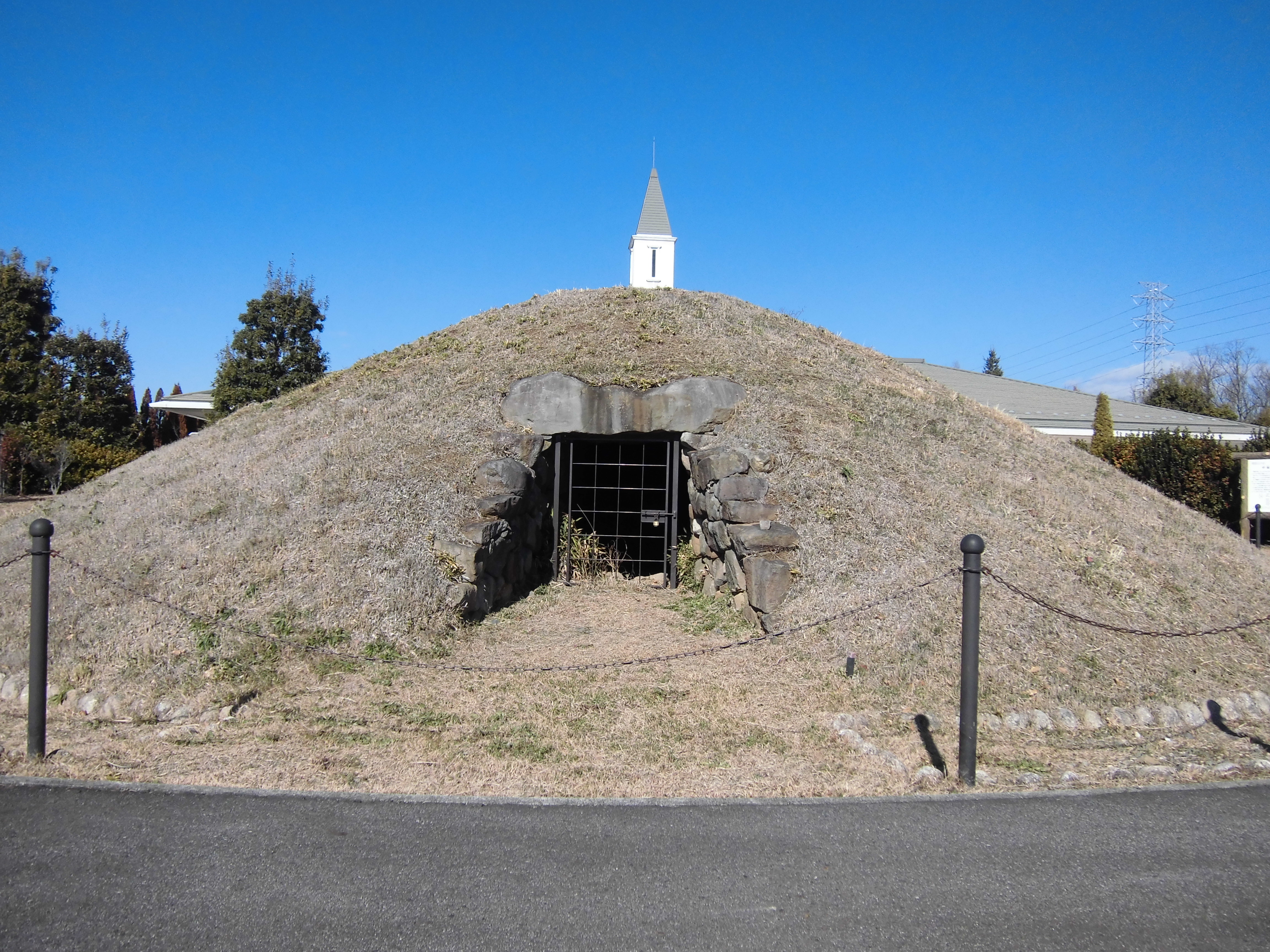
- Nakamakizuka Kofun

- Nakamakizuka Kofun Nakamagizuka Kofun (Japan)
- 35°40′31″N 138°30′14″E
- Type: Kofun
- Periods: Kofun period
- Location: Ryuo-cho, Kai, Yamanashi, Japan
- Region: Tōkai region

History
- Built: early 7th century

Site notes
- Public access: Yes (no facilities)
- Yamanashi Prefecture Historic Site

Nakamakizuka Kofun (中秣塚古墳) is a Kofun period kofun burial mound, located in the Ryuo neighborhood of the city of Kai, Yamanashi in the Tōkai region of Japan. The tumulus was designated a Yamanashi Prefecture Historic Site in 1996.

== Overview ==
The Nakamakizuka Kofun is an enpun (円墳)-style circular tumulus approximately 14 meters in diameter and 2.3 meters high. Its horizontal-entry stone burial chamber has a total length of 8.5 meters, and the main chamber section measuring 4.5 meters in length and 1.2-1.6 meters in width, opening almost to the south. The tumulus is located on a plateau at an altitude of approximately 349 meters, between the Kamanashi River and the Mitsugawa River. It has a surrounding moat.

An archaeological excavation was conducted from 1994, and the grave goods were found to be in good condition, yielding numerous iron arrowheads, straight swords, gold rings, fragments of Sue ware and Haji ware pottery. Based on the form of the burial chamber and the unearthed artifacts, the mound is believed to date to the first half of the 7th century.

The area surrounding this burial mound is known as the Akasaka-dai Kofun cluster (赤坂台古墳群), which consisted of over 30 enpun-style burial mounds; however, most have been destroyed by urban encroachment. Under the ancient Ritsuryo system, this area was part of Koma District and was as an area where many immigrants settled. The current appearance of the is the result of restoration and maintenance work carried out in 1997, which included repairing damaged parts.

== See also ==
- List of Historic Sites of Japan (Yamanashi)
