= Kurokawa gold mine =

Gold mine in Japan

Kurokawa gold mine 黒川金山
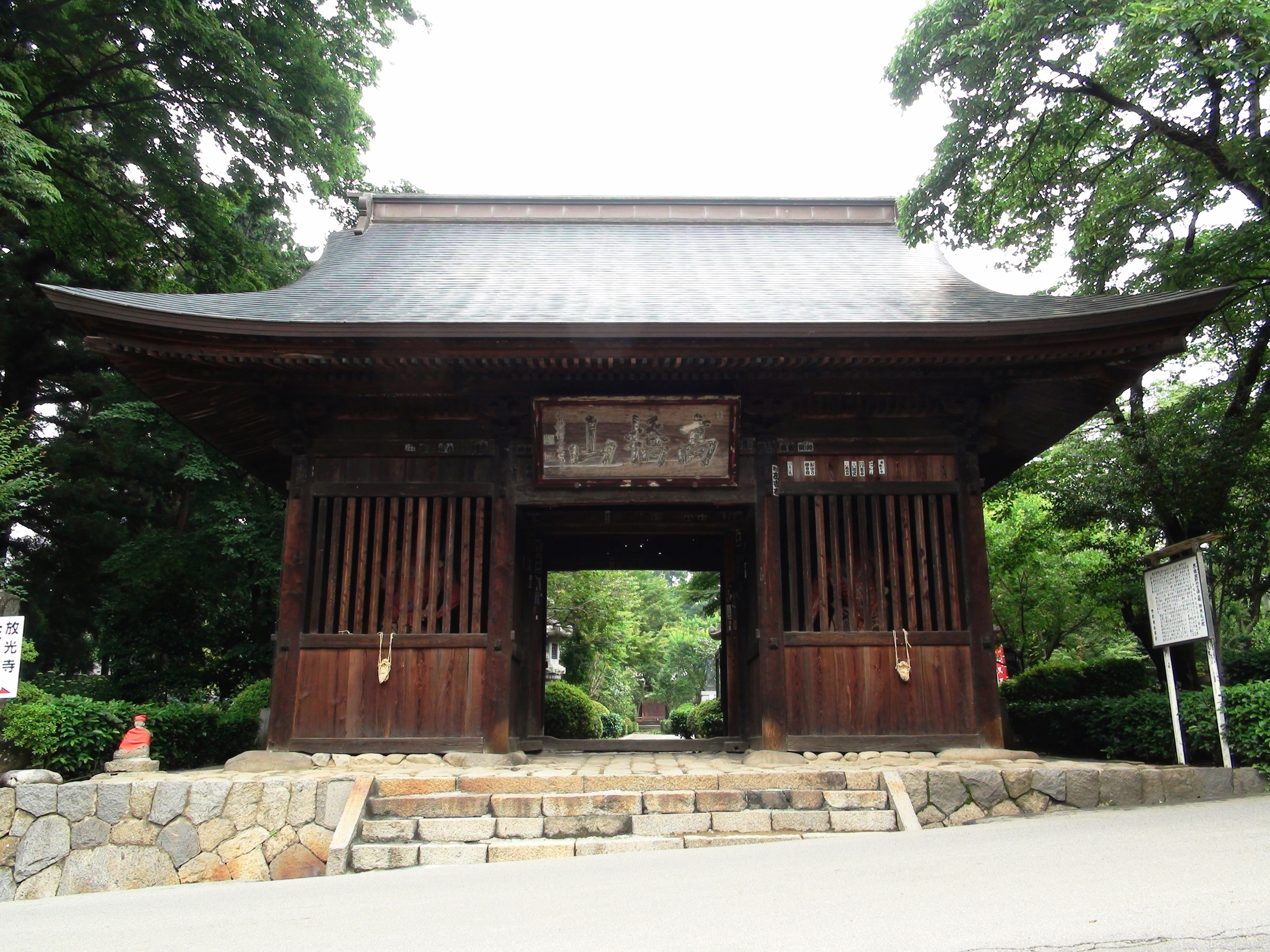
- Hokoji temple located on the site of the Kurokawa gold mine.

- Location in Japan Kurokawa gold mine (Japan)
- Location: Yamanashi Prefecture, Japan; 35°47′20″N 138°50′42″E
- Products: Gold
- Opened: Kamakura period
- Closed: Edo period
- Company: Takeda clan, Tokugawa shogunate
- National Historic Site of Japan

The Kurokawa gold mine (黒川金山, Kurokawa Kinzan) was a gold mine located in the city of Kōshū, Yamanashi, Japan which was in operation for several hundred years from the Sengoku period into the modern era. The site, along with the Nakayama gold mine (中山金山, Nakayama Kinzan) (in Minobu, Yamanashi) was collectively designated a National Historic Site of Japan in 1997 as the Kai gold mine sites (甲斐金山遺跡, Kai Kinzan iseki).

== Overview ==
Kai Province, the ancestral home of the Takeda clan is a very mountainous area which is rich in mineral resources. After Takeda Shingen seized power from his father and unified the province, he developed the gold resources which were known to exist in various areas of the province, minting gold coins called "Kōshū kin", which were in great demand due to their purity.

The Kurokawa mine is located on the hillside of Mount Keikan (also known as Mount Kurokawa) in the northeastern part of the prefecture, at an elevation of 1350 to 1400 meters. Gold in the form of gold dust was known to have been extracted from the area since at least the early Kamakura period, however, exploitation began in earnest by Takeda Shingen and the locations of more than thirty mineheads and a smelter ruins have been found in this area, along with a mining town. Production is estimated to have reached its peak during the tenure of his son, Takeda Katsuyori. After the fall of the Takeda clan, Kai Province came under the control of Tokugawa Ieyasu, and the mines continued to operate into the Edo period under the control of the Tokugawa shogunate. Archaeological excavation has found mining tools such as mortars and chisels, ceramics, and daily necessities such as copper coins. Gold extraction was done by gold panning as well as open pit mining and tunneling. References to the mine disappear from historical records around the Genroku era (1688-1703). An attempt was made to reopen the mine in 1906, but the venture failed after two years. the Kurokawa mine is about 60 minutes by car from Enzan Station on the JR Tōkai Chūō Main Line.

The Nakayama mine is located in Minobu, Yamanashi in the southern part of the prefecture on the slopes of Mount Kenashi at an elevation of 1400 to 1600 meters. The site covers 16.36 hectares, and 124 mine heads have been identified.The site has a flat area where the residences of the workers and a smelter once existed and extensive tailing piles. Its history parallels that of the Kurokawa Mine, and it was controlled by the Anayama clan, retainers of the Takeda clan, and later of the Tokugawa. The mine was first mentioned in official documents in 1571 and was closed at the end of the 17th century. It is about 20 minutes by car from Shimobeonsen Station on the JR Tōkai Minobu Line; however, some artifacts are on display at the Yu-no-oku Museum of Gold Mining History (湯之奥金山博物館, Yunooku Kinzan hakubutsukan) in the town of Minobu.

== See also ==
- List of Historic Sites of Japan (Yamanashi)
- List of mines in Japan
- Sado mine
