= Enkō-in =

Buddhist temple in Kōfu, Yamanashi, Japan

- 円光院
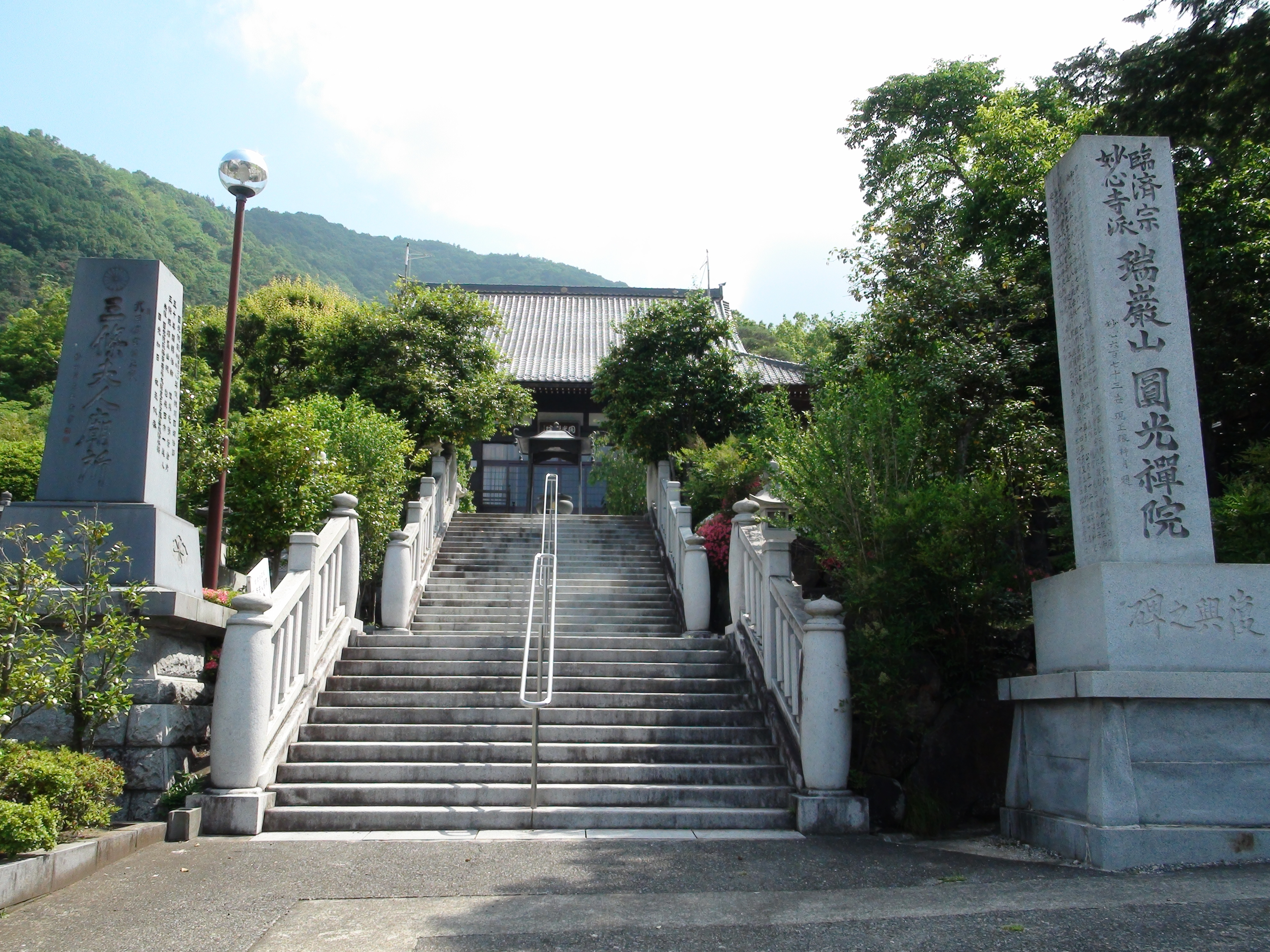
- Enkō-in Hondō

- Location within Yamanashi Prefecture Location within Japan

Religion
- Affiliation: Buddhist
- Deity: Shakyamuni Buddha
- Rite: Rinzai school
- Status: functional

Location
- Location: 500 Iwakubo, Kōfu-shi, Yamanashi-ken
- Interactive map of Enkō-in
- Coordinates: 35°40′58.4″N 138°35′13.5″E

Architecture
- Founder: Takeda Shingen
- Completed: 1560

Website
- Official website
- Yamanashi Prefecture Historic Site

Enkō-in (円光院) is a Buddhist temple located in the Iwakubo neighborhood of the city of Kōfu, Yamanashi Prefecture, Japan. It belongs to the Myōshin-ji branch of Rinzai Zen and its honzon is a statue of Shakyamuni Buddha. The temple's full name is Zuiganzan Enkō-in (瑞巌山 円光院). It is one of the five temples in Kōfu established by Takeda Shingen during the Sengoku period, and is known as the family temple of Shingen's wife, Lady Sanjō.

== History ==
According to Volume 82 of the Edo period histories Kai no Kuni Shi (History of Kai Province) and Volume 32 of the Kai no Kuni Shaki/Ji Ki, (Temples and Shrines of Kai Province) the predecessor of Enkō-in was Seikō-ji, built in Fuefuki, Yamanashi by Minamoto no Kiyomitsu, the founder of the Kai Minamoto clan. During the Muromachi period, it was rebuilt by Takeda Nobumori, the shugo of Kai Province, as the memorial temple for his father, Takeda Nobushige, and renamed Jōjū-in. During the Sengoku period, Takeda Nobutora moved his stronghold from Fuefuki to the jōkamachi of Kōfu, and Jōjū-in was relocated to the castle town by his son, Takeda Shingen (Harunobu) during the Eiroku era and designated as one of the "Kōfu Gozan" in imitation of the great monasteries of Kyoto and Kamakura. After the death of Shingen's wife, Lady Sanjō, in 1570, the temple was renamed after her dharma name and her tomb was built on the west side of the temple grounds.

Yanagisawa Yoshiyasu, a close advisor who became the daimyō of the short-lived Kōfu Domain during the Edo period, claimed descent from a former Takeda retainer and donated a stone lantern to Enkō-in. The temple burned down in 1746 and was rebuilt in the Hōreki era (1751-1760) by the Hiraoka clan, who served as magistrates of Kōfu under the Tokugawa shogunate and who made the temple their bodaiji. The current main hall was rebuilt in 1977.

The temple is five minutes by car from Kōfu Station (North Exit) on the JR Tokai Chūō Main Line.

=== Grave of Lady Sanjō ===
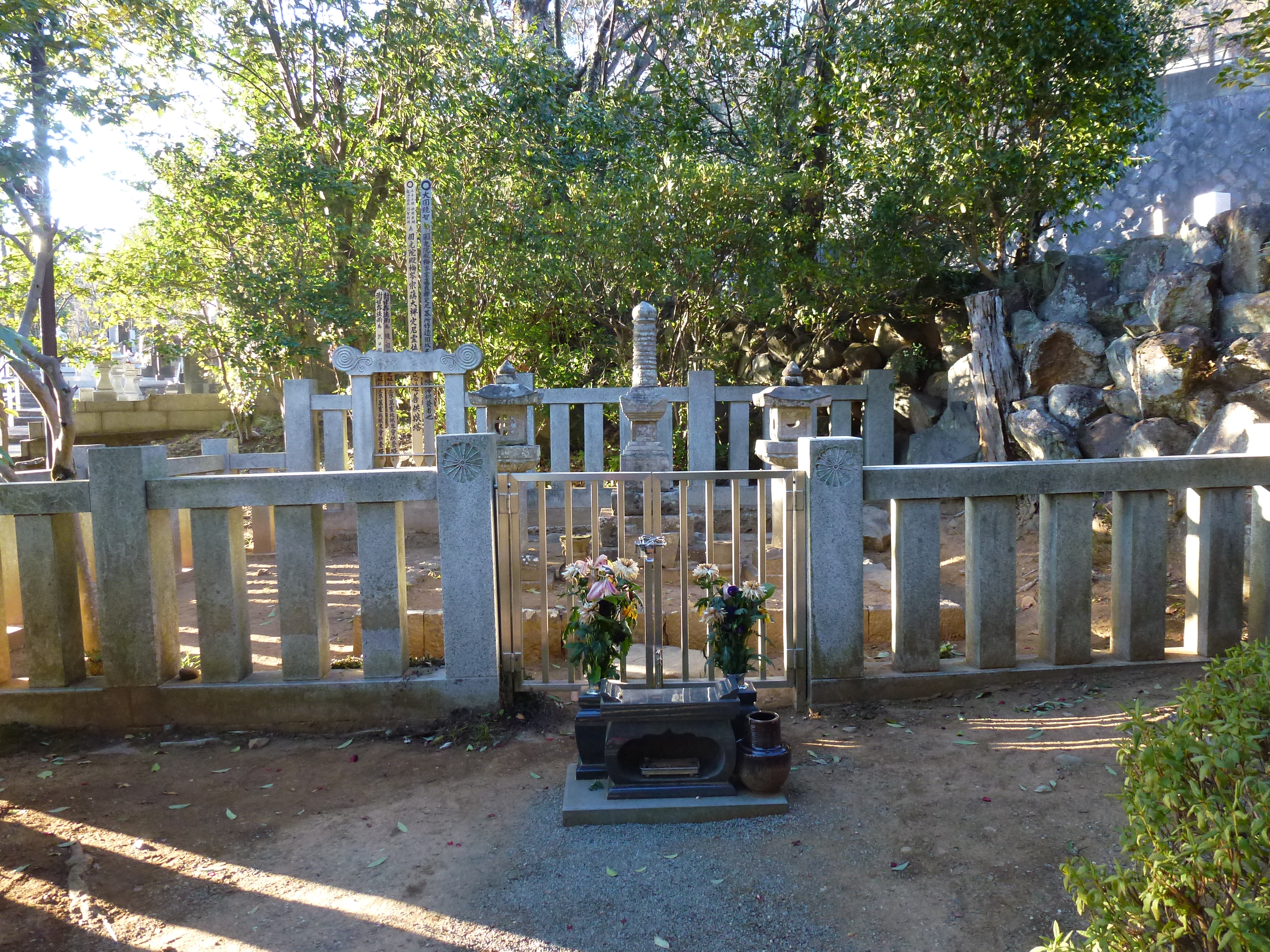
Grave of Lady Sanjō

The Grave of Lady Sanjō (武田晴信室三条氏墓) consists of one Hōkyōintō pagoda and two stone lanterns. The Hōkyōintō pagoda is currently 121 centimeters tall (from the bottom of the base to the top of the finial). The base has three upper tiers, with framed panels on the front and south sides, and latticed panels carved inside these panels. The finial is thick, a characteristic of 16th-century Hōkyōintō pagodas. The upper part of the jewel is missing, and the nine-ring structure is broken in the middle. It connects to the cap with a handle and handle hole, and the lower part of the cap is carved with lotus and inverted flower ornaments. The finial has five tiers above the eaves and three tiers below, with two outward-curving corner projections. Part of the cap is similarly damaged. There are three tiers of base stones below the base, but it is unclear whether this was the original arrangement, as photographs of the tomb from the Meiji period show a different appearance from the present day, with the orientation of the Hōkyōintō pagoda and the positions of the finial and roof being reversed, confirming that it had been rebuilt several times.The two existing stone lanterns bear the date September 17, 1718, suggesting that the site was renovated to coincide with the 150th anniversary of Lady Sanjō's death. The grave is a Yamanashi Prefecture Designated Historic Site.

== See also ==
- List of Historic Sites of Japan (Yamanashi)
