= Ubazuka Kofun =

Kofun period keyhole-shaped burial mound in Yamanashi, Japan

- 姥塚古墳 (Japanese)
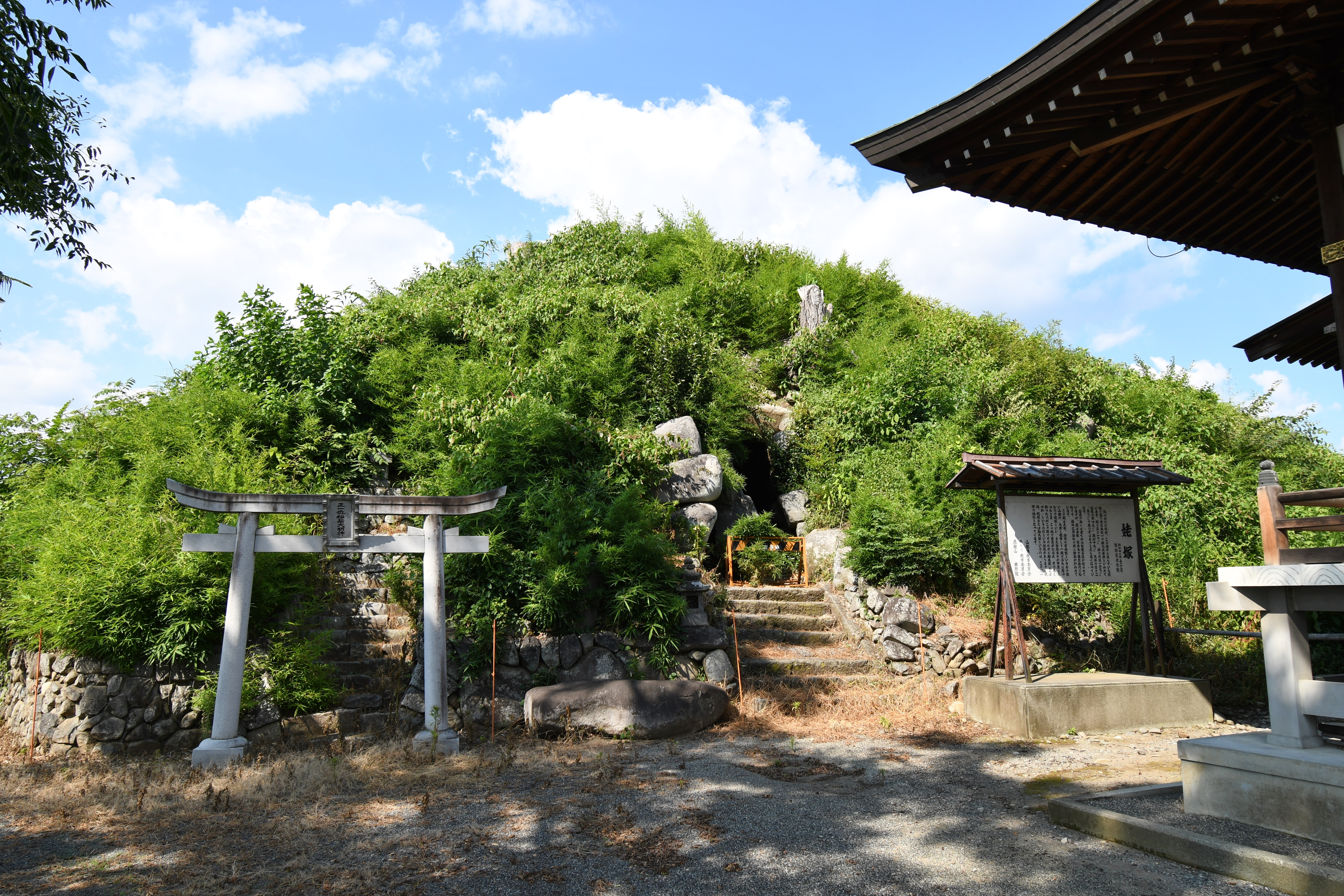
- Ubazuka Kofun

- Ubazuka Kofun Ubazuka Kofun (Japan)
- 35°38′4.95″N 138°39′29.85″E
- Type: Kofun
- Periods: Kofun period
- Location: 94 Shimoinoue, Misaka-cho, Fuefuki, Yamanashi, Japan
- Region: Tōkai region

History
- Built: late 6th century

Site notes
- Public access: Yes (no facilities)
- Yamanashi Prefecture Historic Site

Ubazuka Kofun (姥塚古墳) is a Kofun period (late 6th century) keyhole-shaped burial mound, located in the Mimasako-cho Shimoinoue neighborhood of Fuefuki, Yamanashi in the Tōkai region of Japan. The tumulus was designated a Yamanashi Prefecture Historic Site in 1965. Currently located within the grounds of a Buddhist temple, the Jigenzan Nanshō-in, a statue of Kannon is enshrined inside the burial chamber.

== Overview ==
The Ubazuka Kofun is a large enpun (円墳)-style circular tumulus constructed on the left bank of the Kanagawa alluvial fan in the southeastern part of the Kōfu Basin. It measures approximately 40 meters in diameter and ten meters in height and was surrounded by a moat. It contains a single-chambered horizontal stone burial chamber opening to the southwest. The burial chamber measures 17.54 meters in length, making it the largest in Yamanashi Prefecture and one of the largest in eastern Japan. It was constructed of natural stones measuring 1-1.5 meters; however the back wall is constructed in two layers, with the lower layer consisting of two pieces and the upper layer consisting of a single monolith, and there are five ceiling stones in the burial chamber and four in the passage (one at the opening has collapsed). The boundary between the burial chamber and the passage is demarcated by a square pillar stone measuring 0.9 meters wide and approximately two meters high. There is a theory that the passage is 5-6 meters longer than at present, given the presence of large stones scattered throughout the grounds of Nanshō-in, which may have been repurposed ceiling stones. The burial chamber has been open for centuries, and no grave goods have been found.

The kofun is believed to have been constructed around the end of the 6th century during the late Kofun period. To the south lies the Ninomiya-Ubazuka site, a settlement site from the same period. According to legend, it is called "Ubazuka" (Old Woman's Mound) because a mountain hag competed with a giant to build it, and it is also called "Onbazuka" (Prince Shotoku's Mound) because his beloved horse collapsed and was buried there when he visited Kai Province.

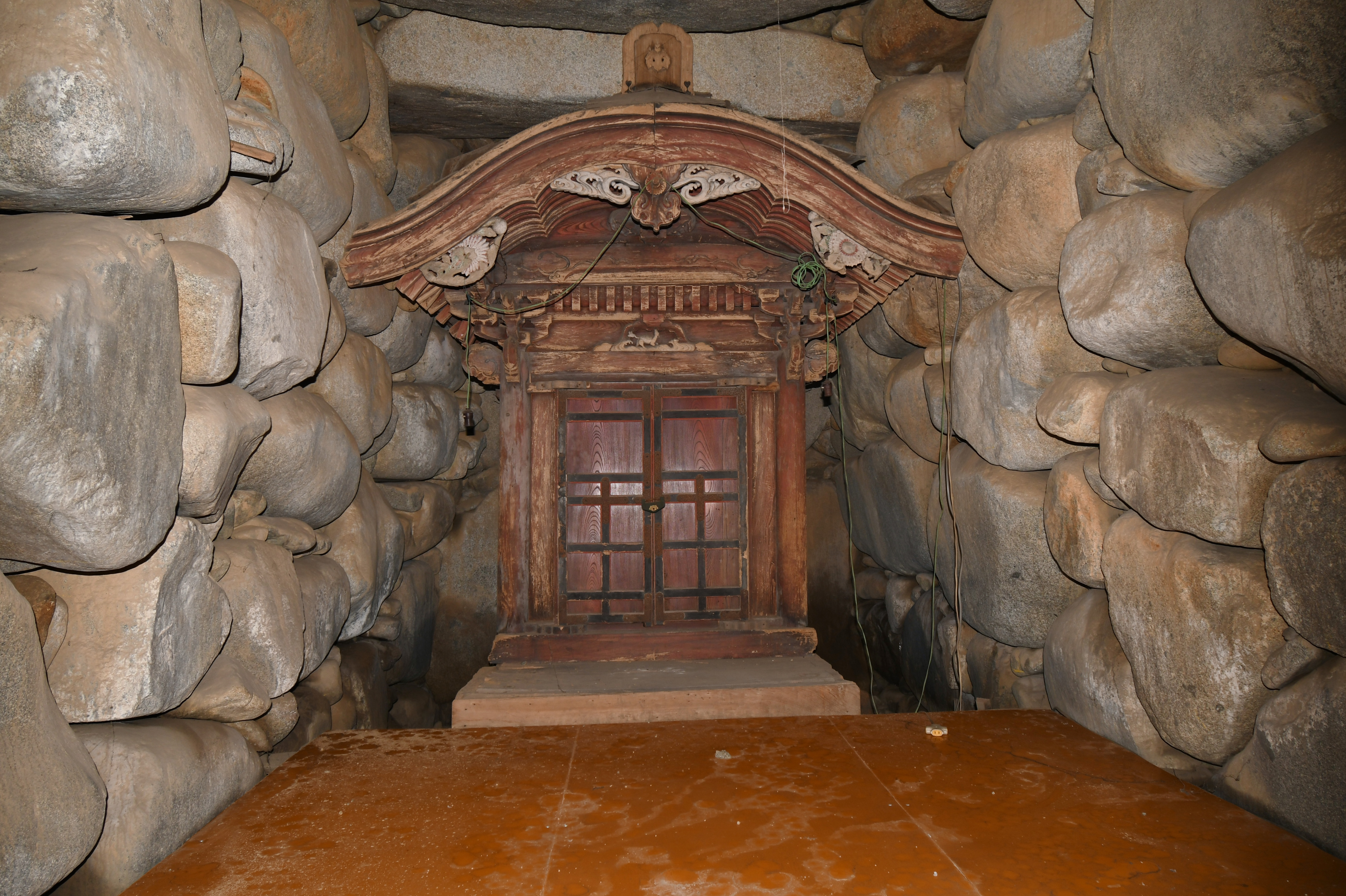
Burial Chamber (towards the back wall)

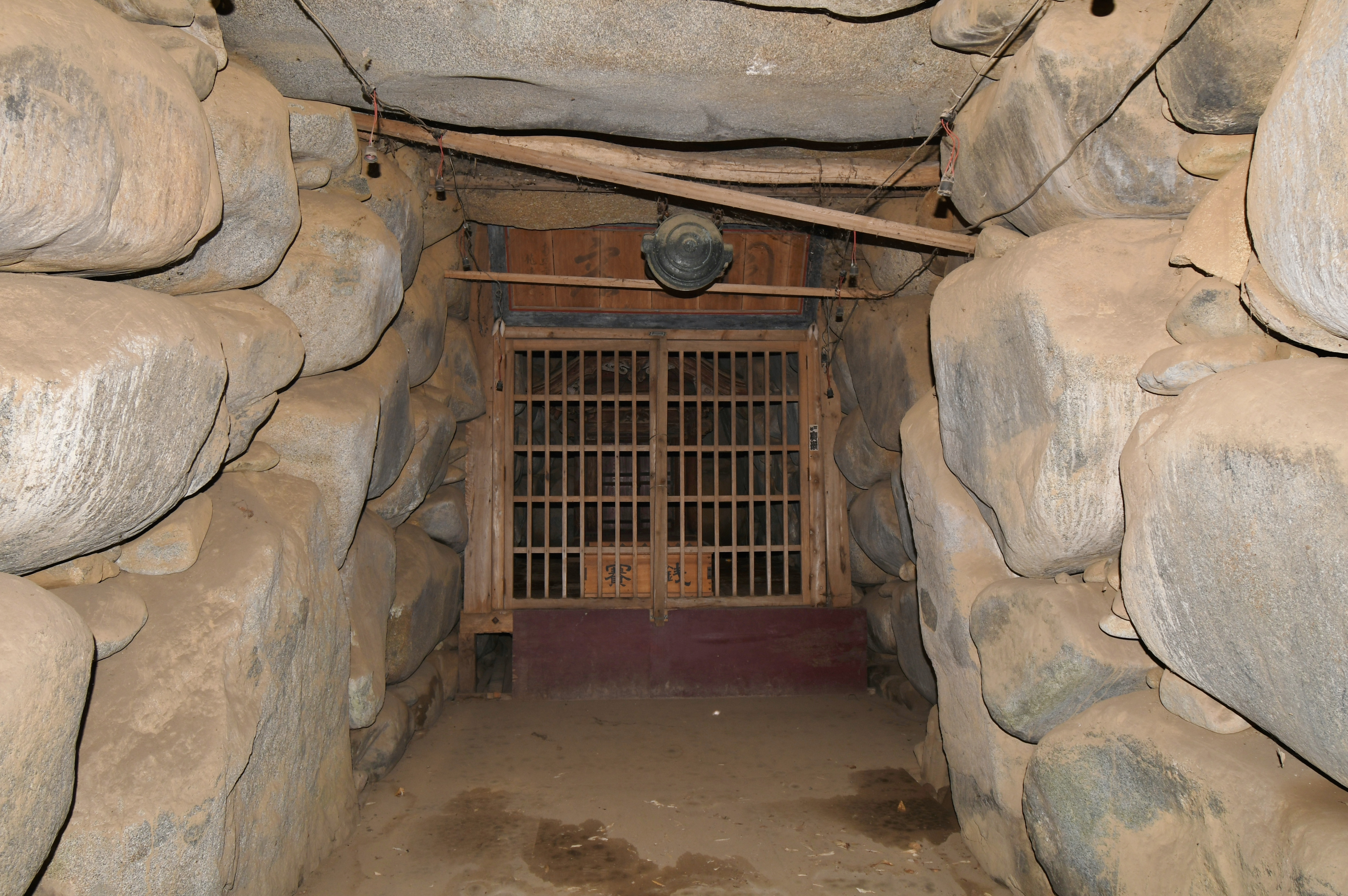
Burial Chamber (towards the back wall)

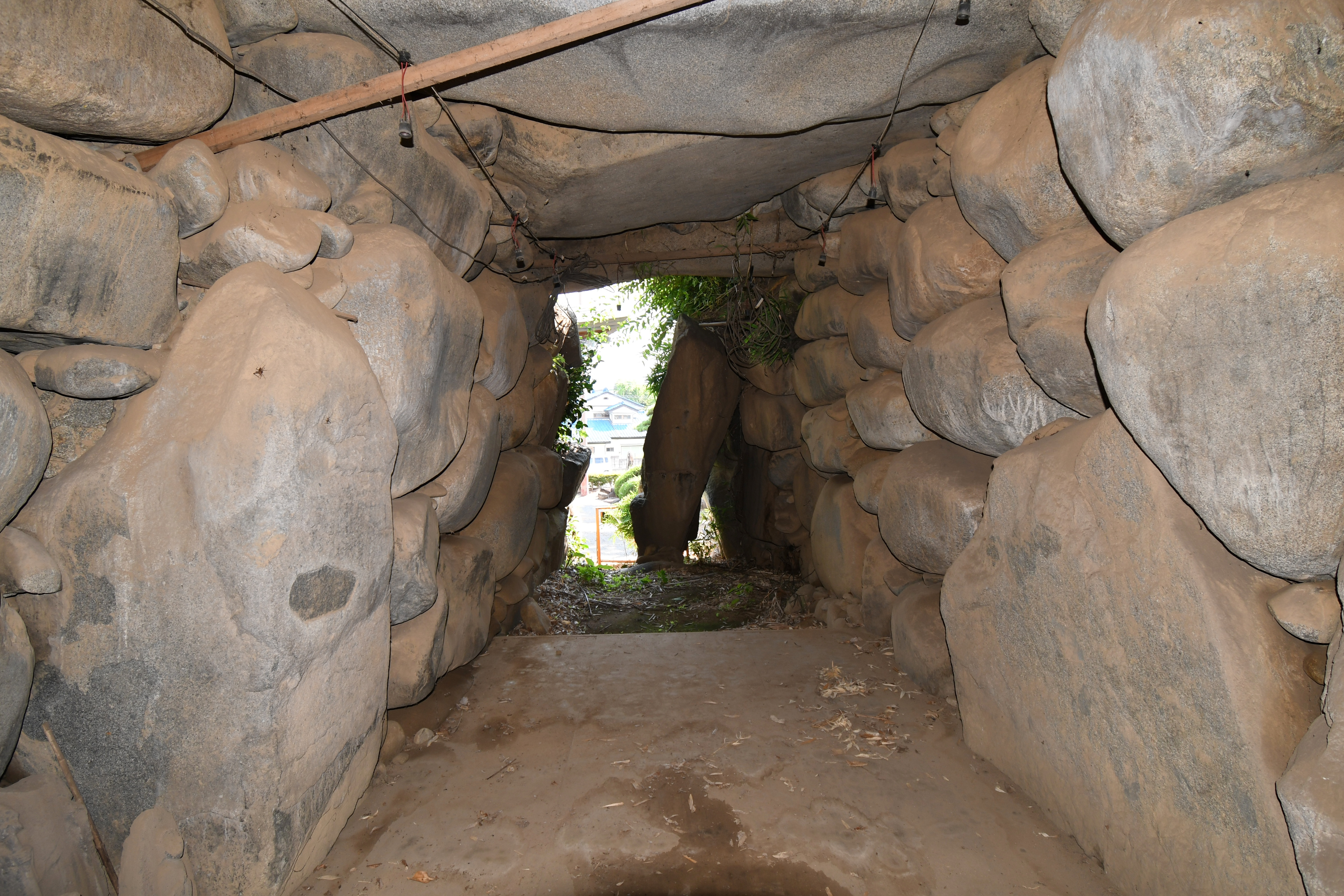
Burial Chamber (towards the entry)

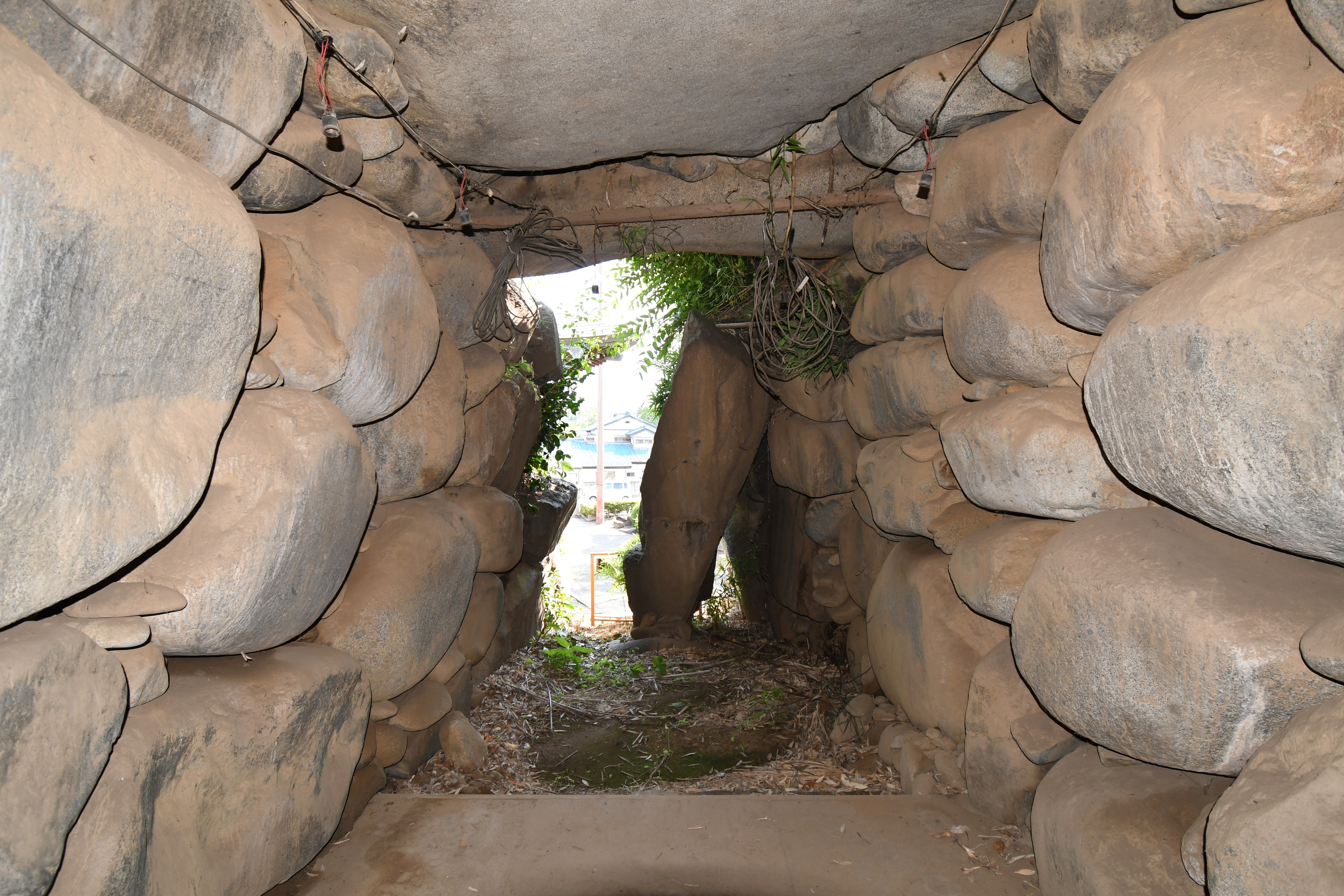
Entrance Passage (towards the opening)

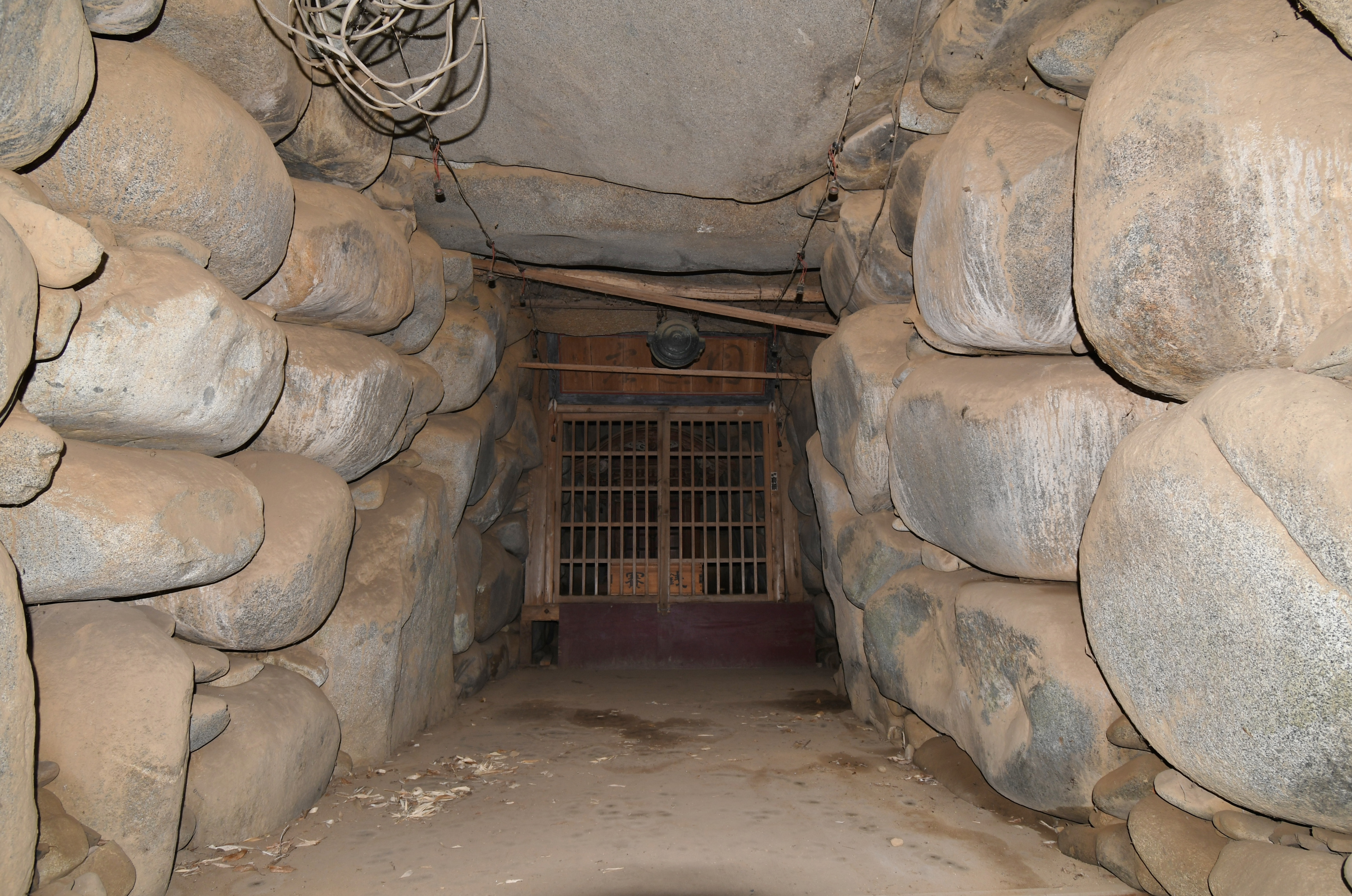
Entrance Passage (towards the burial chamber)

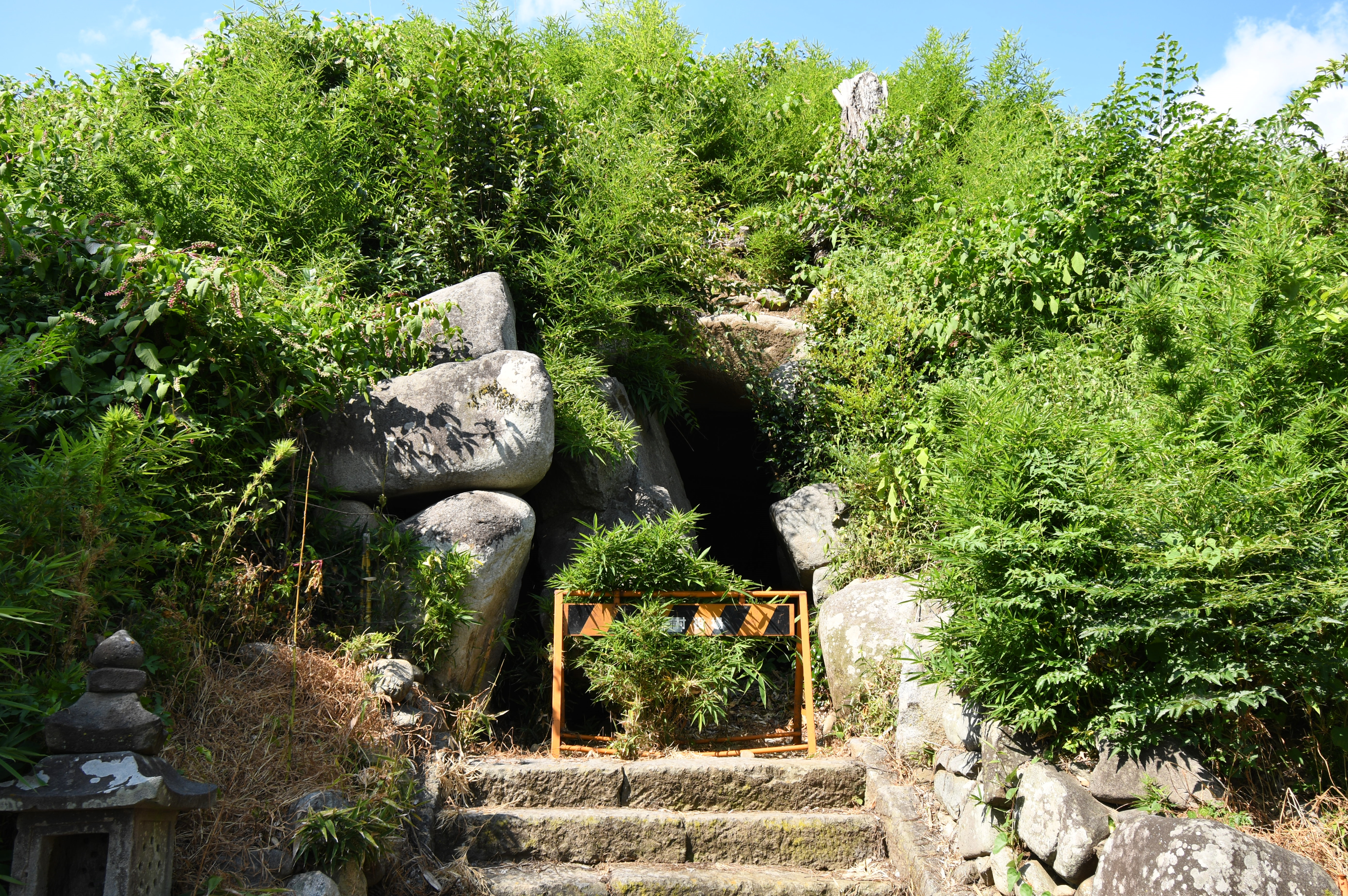
Entrance

== See also ==
- List of Historic Sites of Japan (Yamanashi)
