= Kamunazuka Kofun =

Kofun period burial mound in Yamanashi, Japan

- 加牟那塚 (Japanese)
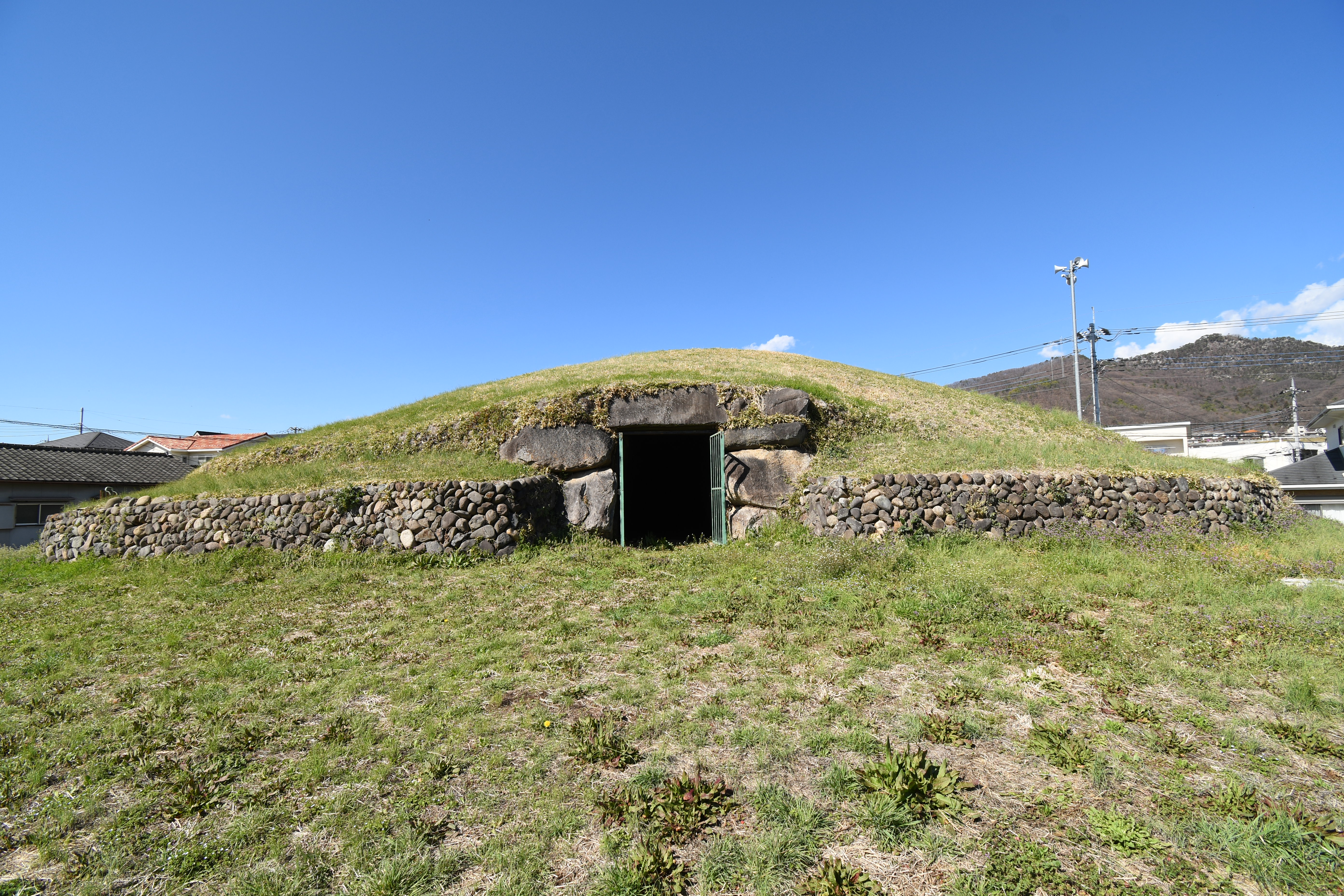
- Kamunazuka Kofun

- Kamunazuka Kofun Kamunazuka Kofun (Japan)
- 35°41′04.51″N 138°32′37.01″E
- Type: Kofun
- Periods: Kofun period
- Location: Senzuka, Kōfu, Yamanashi, Japan
- Region: Tōkai region

History
- Built: late 6th century

Site notes
- Public access: Yes (no facilities)
- Yamanashi Prefecture Historic Site

Kamunazuka Kofun (加牟那塚古墳) is a Kofun period (early 5th century) kofun burial mound, located in the Senzuka neighborhood of the city of Kōfu, Yamanashi in the Tōkai region of Japan. The tumulus was designated a Yamanashi Prefecture Historic Site in 1968.

== Overview ==
The Kamunazuka Kofun is a enpun (円墳)-style round tumulus, with a diameter of 45 meters and height of 7.3 meters. The mound was constructed in two tiers, and was faced with fukiishi revetment stones and haniwa clay figures. It is located in the central part of the prefecture, on the northern edge of the Kōfu Basin, on a gently sloping area on the left bank of the Arakawa River. The Arakawa River flows southeast along the border with Kai city, and the area from the Arakawa alluvial fan on the northern edge of the basin is densely populated with late Kofun period burial mounds, as the name "senzuka" indicates.

The existence of the Kamunatsuka Kofun has been known since ancient times. During the Edo period, it was recorded in the 1601 Senzuka Village Land Survey Register and in the "Kai no Kuni Shi," a comprehensive geographical record of Kai Province, and was known by names such as "Kanazuka," "Kamazuka," and "Kamizuka." In 1969, repair work was carried out at the base of the burial mound. Prior to the work, an archaeological excavation was conducted by Aoyama Gakuin University. The internal structure is a right-sided, single-chambered horizontal stone burial chamber, opening due south. It is the second largest horizontal stone burial chamber in the prefecture, measuring 16.75 meters in length and approximately three meters in height.

The tumulus is believed to date from the late 6th century, characterized by the type, large size and use of large stones in the construction of the burial chamber. In the 6th century, the construction of burial mounds with horizontal stone chambers began, and an influx of immigrants to Kai Province from mainland Asia is known. The name "Kamuna" is thought to be of Goguryeo origin, and according to legend, a large group of immigrants fleeing the wars on the Korean Peninsula landed in what is now Toyama Prefecture and made their way inland to settle in the Kōfu Basin.

Excavated grave goods include Sue ware pottery, small glass beads, and three shinju-kyo bronze mirrors: an inner-patterned floral mirror, a divine beast mirror, and a dragon mirror, although their whereabouts are unknown. Other artifacts include swords, shields, and figurative haniwa in the form of everyday utensils, horses, and warriors. Analysis of the clay body of the excavated haniwa revealed that 10 out of 11 analyzed samples had almost identical compositions, containing many red grains of ejecta from the Kurofuji volcano, collected from the river terraces of the Arakawa and Shiokawa rivers. The remaining sample contained a large amount of granite, suggesting it may have been brought from another region, such as the Sone Hills.

Some of the excavated artifacts are housed in the Yamanashi Prefectural Archaeological Museum.

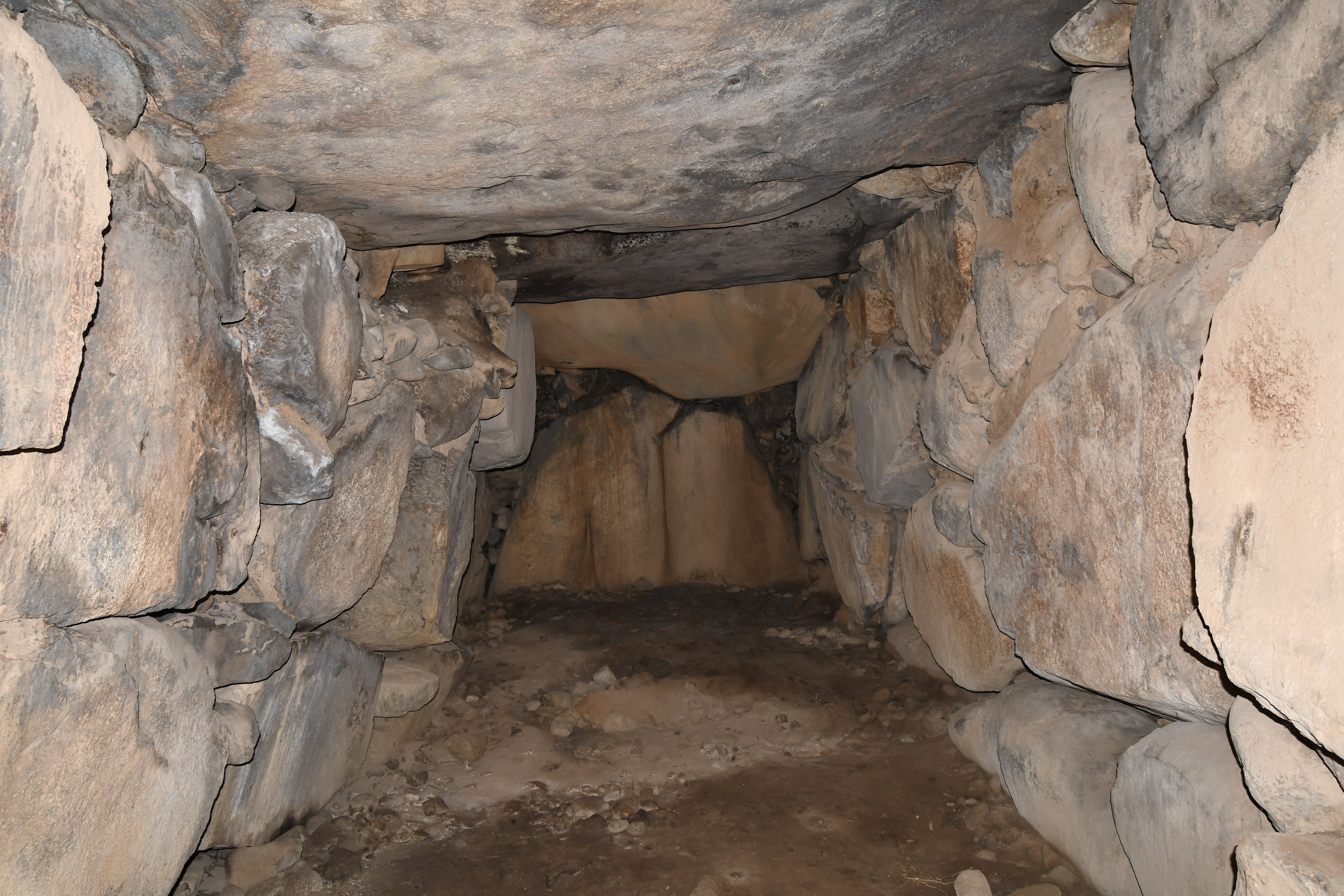
Burial chamber（looking from entrance）

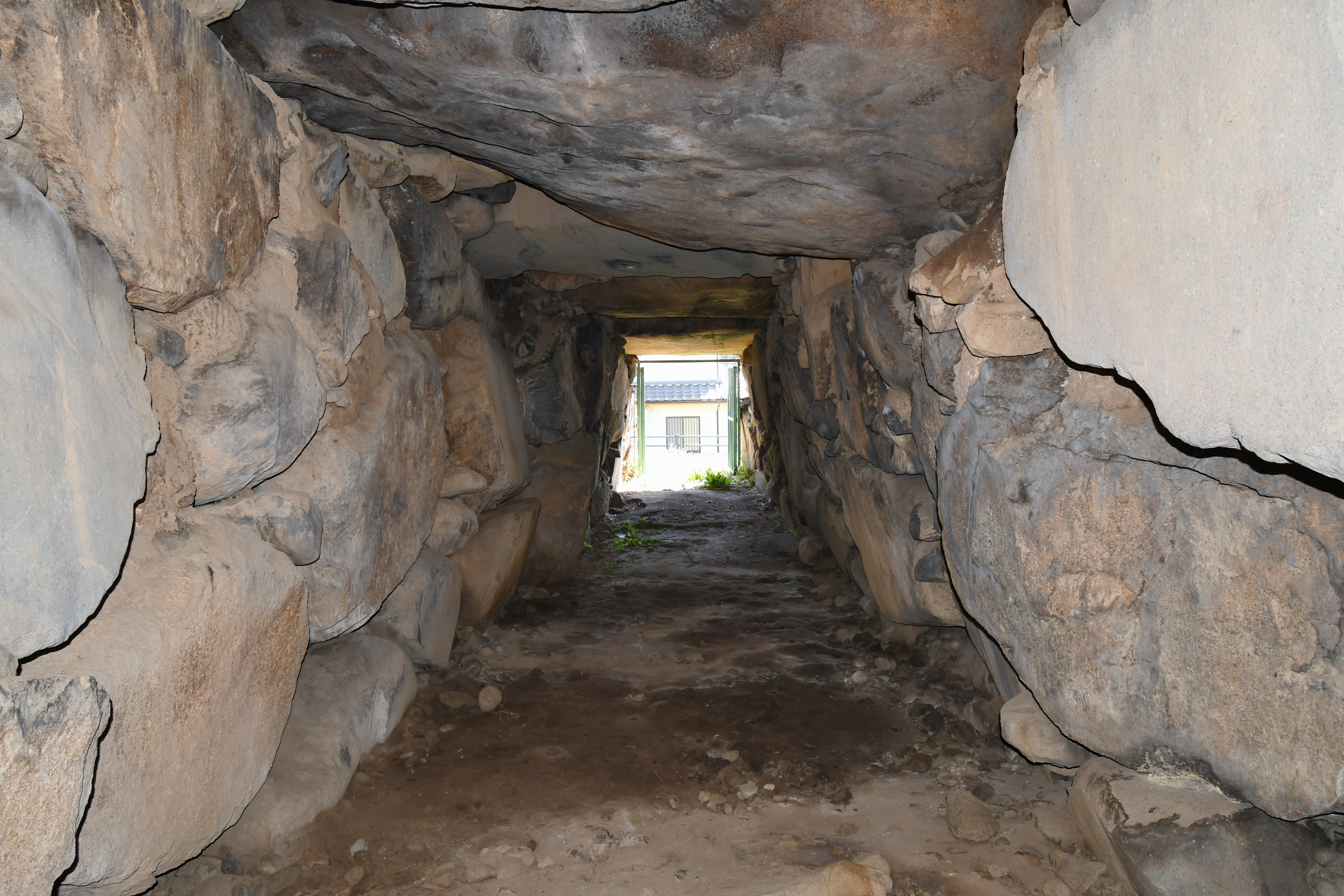
Burial chamber（looking towards entrance）

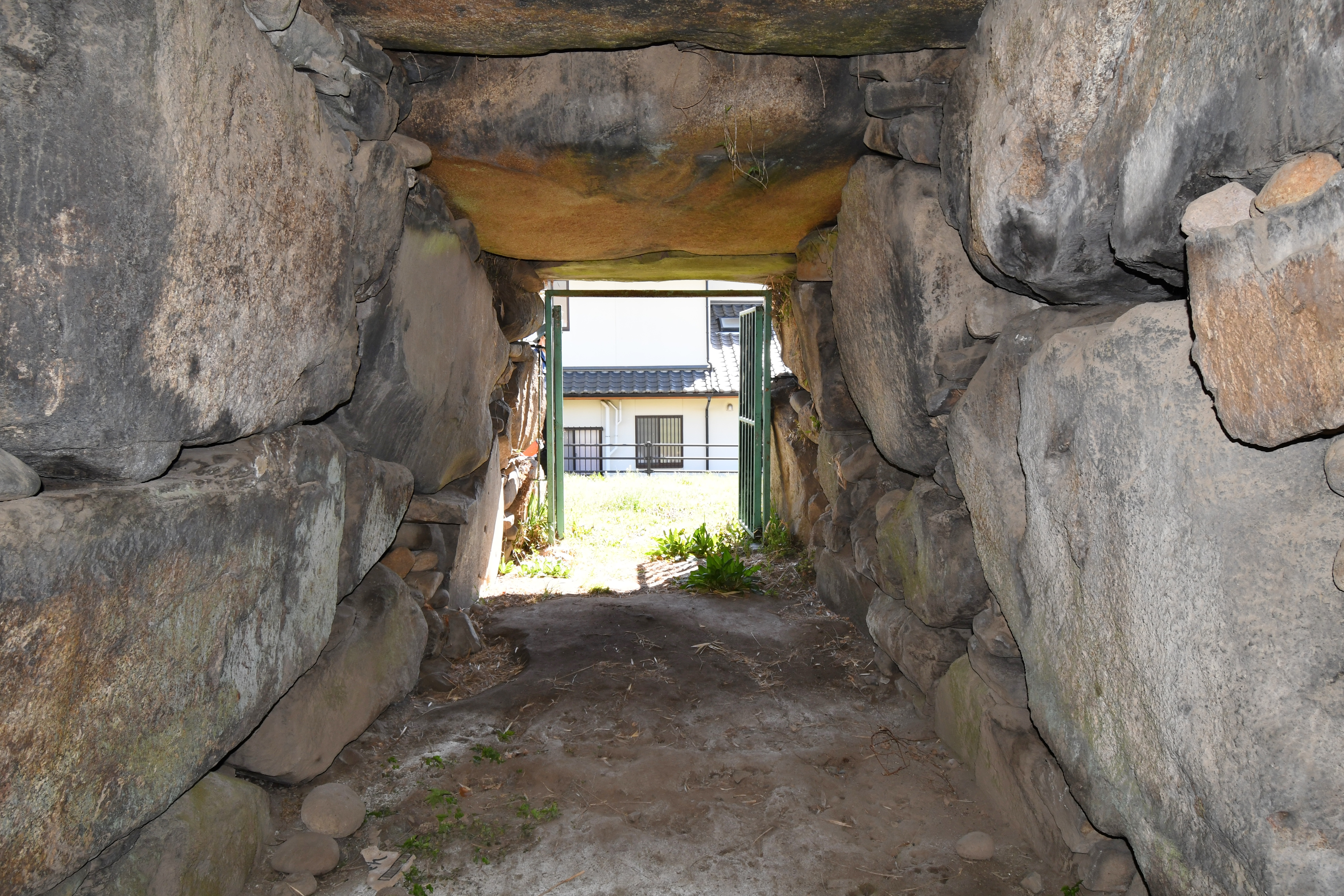
Corridor (looking towards entrance）

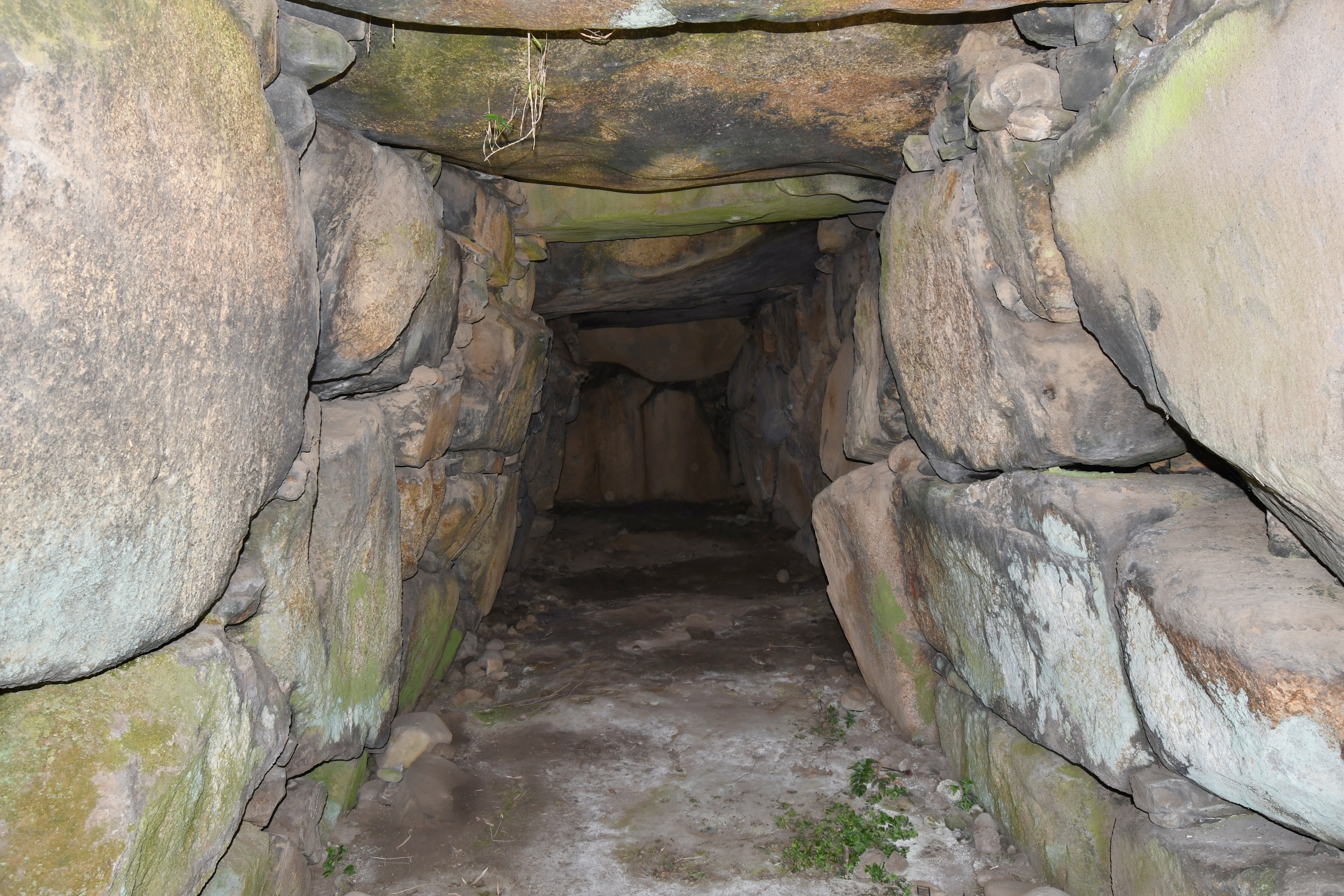
Corridor（looking from entrance）

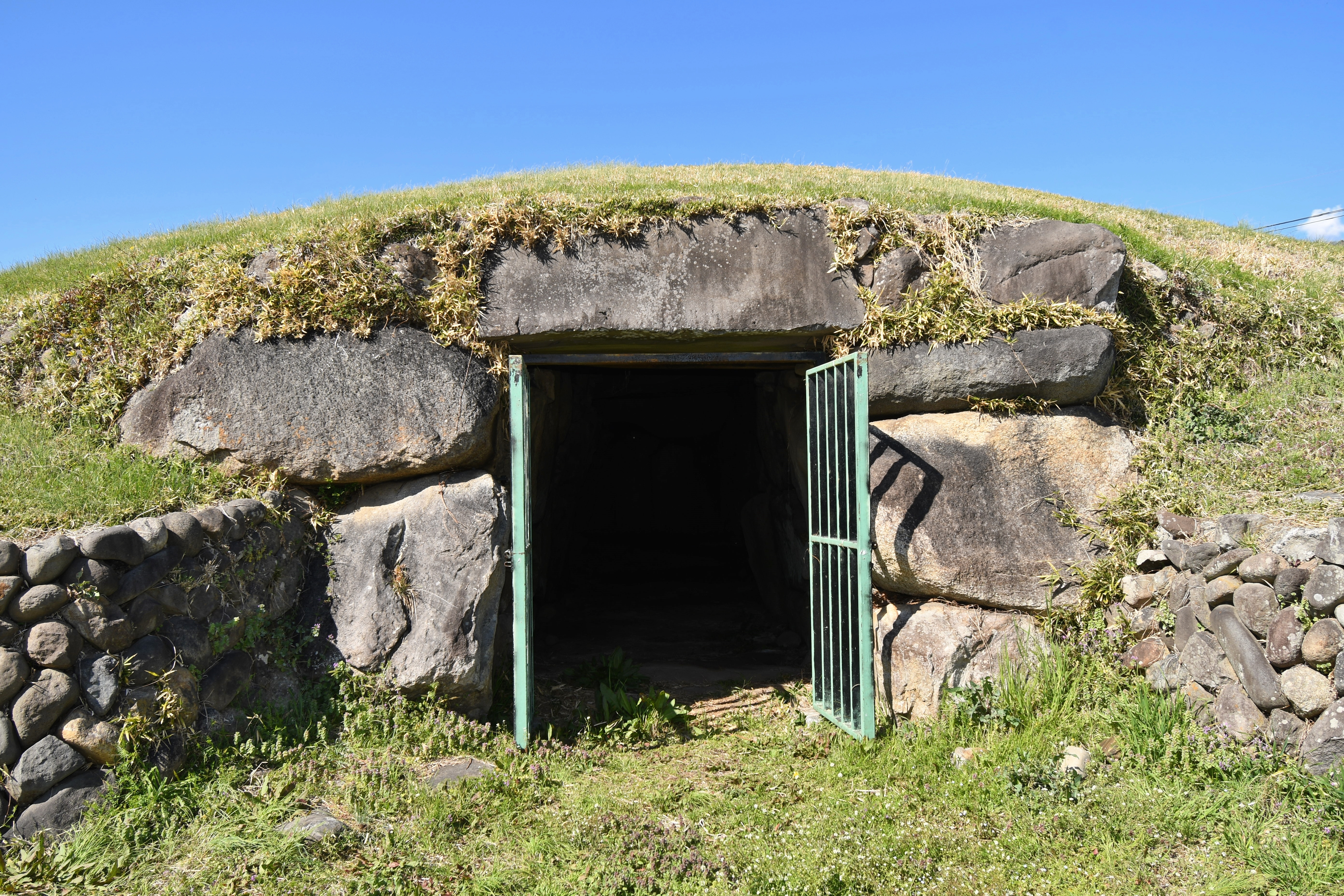
Entrance

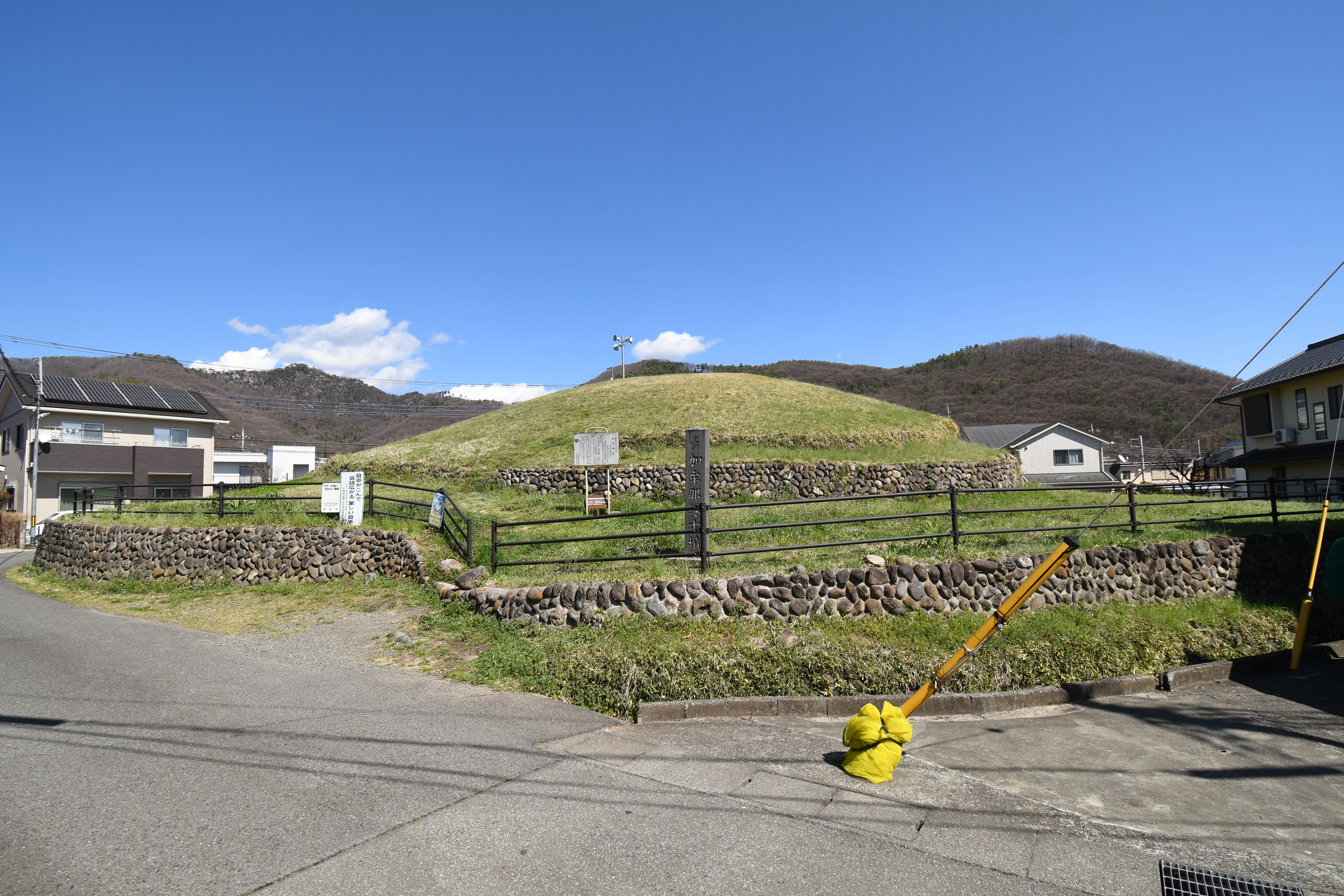
Tumulus

== See also ==
- List of Historic Sites of Japan (Yamanashi)
