= Kai Chōshizuka Kofun =

Burial mound in Kōfu, Japan

- 甲斐銚子塚古墳 (Japanese)
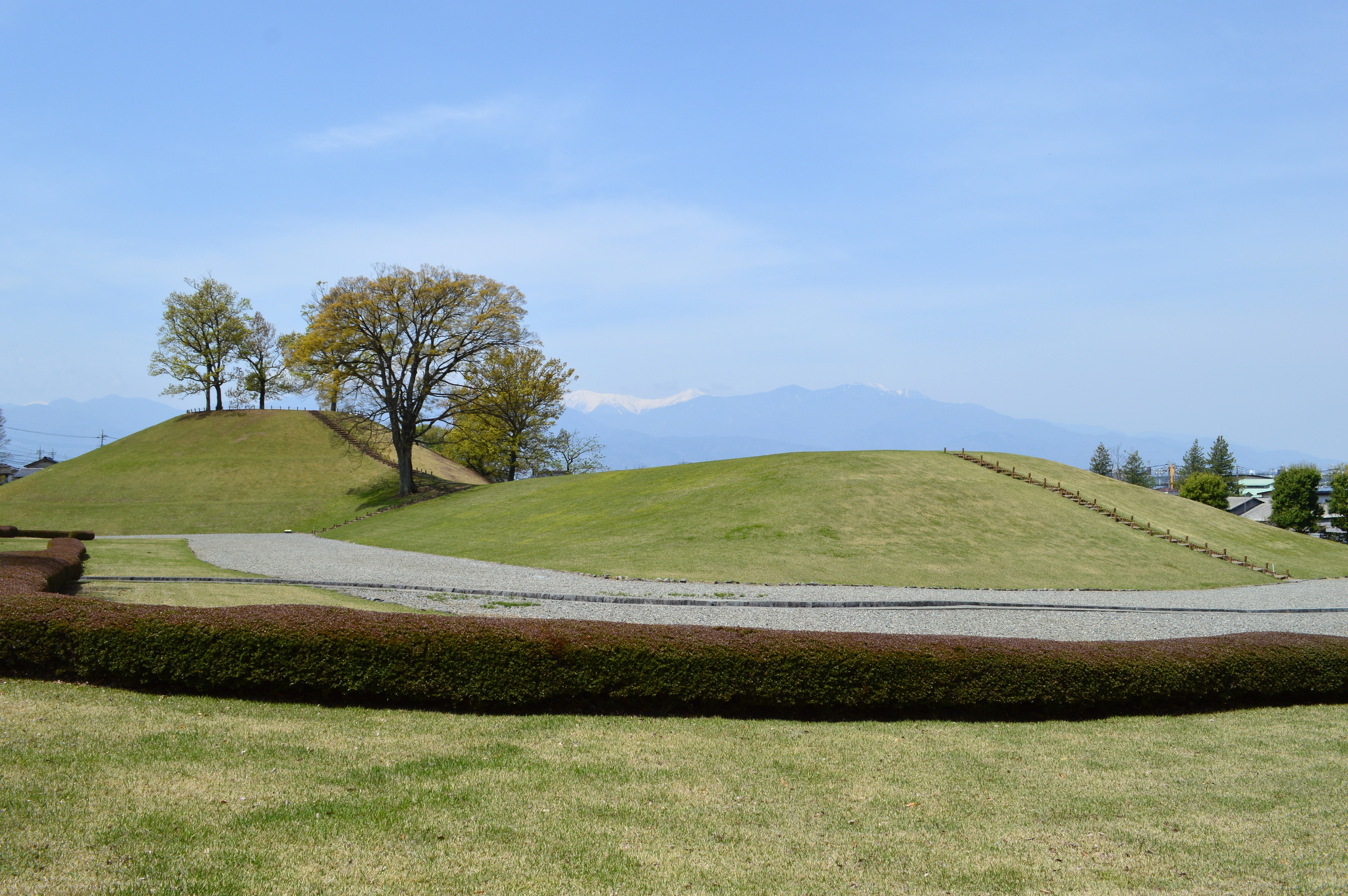
- Kai Chōshizuka Kofun

- Kai Chōshizuka Kofun Kai Chōshizuka Kofun (Japan)
- 35°35′33″N 138°34′45″E
- Type: kofun
- Periods: Kofun period
- Location: Kōfu, Yamanashi, Japan
- Region: Chūbu region

History
- Built: 4th century AD

Site notes
- Public access: Yes

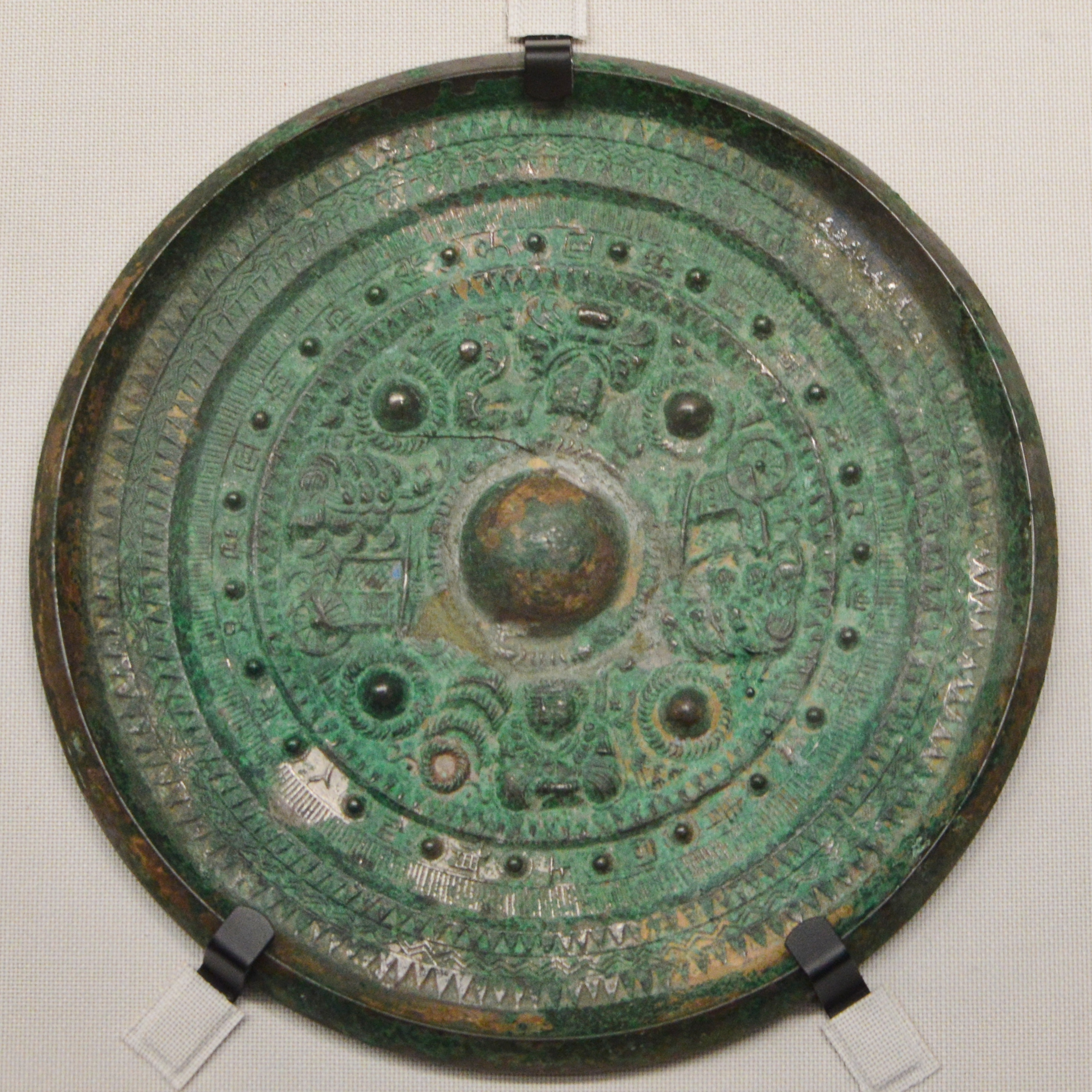
Bronze Mirror excavated at the Kai Chōshizuka Kofun

The Kai Chōshizuka Kofun (甲斐銚子塚古墳) is a kofun burial mound located in the Shimosone neighborhood of the city of Kōfu, Yamanashi in the Chūbu region of Japan. Together with the adjacent Maruyamazuka Kofun (丸山塚古墳) it was designated as a National Historic Site of Japan in 1930. It is one of the largest keyhole-shaped tumuli in eastern Japan and has a total length of 169 meters. The tumuli are located a three minute walk from the "Kenritsukōkohakubutsukan" bus stop on the Yamanashi Kōtsu Kankō Bus from Kōfu Station.

== Overview ==
"Chōshizuka" is a popular name for keyhole-shaped tumuli ( zenpō-kōen-fun (前方後円墳)), which are shaped like a keyhole, having one square end and one circular end, when viewed from above. However, in the Edo period, the shape of the tumulus from the side was thought to resemble that of a chōshi, or long-handled sake bottle, and thus kofun named "Chōshizuka" are found in many locations. Thisi Chōshizuka Kofun is located in the southeastern edge of the Kofu Basin at an elevation of 260 meters, at the northern foot of the Sone Hills on the left bank of the Fuefuki River. The area has a high concentration of kofun, and this tumulus is part of the Higashiyama Kofun cluster. The tumulus has a three tier posterior circle, 92 meters in diameter and 15 meters in height, with a two tier anterior rectangular portion with a width of 69 meters and height of 8.5 meters. It was once covered in fukiishi and haniwa, and was once surrounded by moat. It is orientated facing east.

The tumulus was excavated in 1925, at which time a vertical-type stone-lined burial chamber was discovered in the center of the posterior circle. The chamber had an inner length of 6.5 meters, a width of 0.9 meters, and a height of 1.2 meters. The opening of this burial chamber in 1928 drew considerable attention due to the wealth of grave goods and clear connections to the Kansai region of Japan. It had a thick vermillion coating on the walls and floor. Of especial interest were five bronze mirrors, which had been made from the same mold as bronze mirrors recovered from the Bizen Kurumazuka Kofun (Okayama), the Sanbongi Kofun (Fujioka, Gunma), and the Fujisaki Site (Fukuoka, leading to speculation that these were some of the 100 mirrors sent by Emperor Cao Rui to the Kingdom of Yamatai in 238 AD per ancient Chinese records.

Other artifacts included a large quantity of iron swords, spearheads, and other weapons, stone tools and various items of jewelry, including magatama and cylindrical beads. From these artifacts, the tumulus can be dated to the early Kofun period, around the late 4th century AD, and it can be inferred that the people who constructed it had strong ties to the imperial dynasty. Many theories have been advanced as to the identity of the person buried in this tomb. One theory is that it is a person named "Mihitaki no Okina" based on accounts of the travels of Yamato Takeru in this area during this time period as recounted in the Kojiki and Nihon Shoki. Most of the artifacts recovered from this site are now stored at the Tokyo National Museum.

Further excavations were conducted in 1966 by Meiji University and in 1985 by the Yamanashi Prefectural Board of Education, and the surrounding area has been maintained as a public park. In excavations from 2001 to 2004, a protrusion was discovered on the west side of the posterior circle. This area was found to contain an unprecedented amount of wooden artifacts pertaining to rituals which were conducted at the site.

=== Maruyamazuka Kofun ===
The Maruyamazuka Kofun is an empun (円墳)) tumuli located about 80 meters east of the front part of the Kai Chōshizuka Kofun. It has a diameter about 72 meters and height of 11 meters. The tumulus is a two-tiered structure with haniwa and a moat. It was excavated in 1904, earlier than the Kai Chōshizuka Kofun. At the top of the mound there was a 5.5 meter-long pit-type burial chamber which was found to contain a Shinju-kyo bronze mirror, an iron sword, an iron ax, a sickle, and other items. It is believed to date from slightly later than the Kai Chōshizuka Kofun.

== See also ==
- List of Historic Sites of Japan (Yamanashi)
