= Ōhikage Tunnel =

Tunnel in Kōshū, Yamanashi Prefecture, Japan

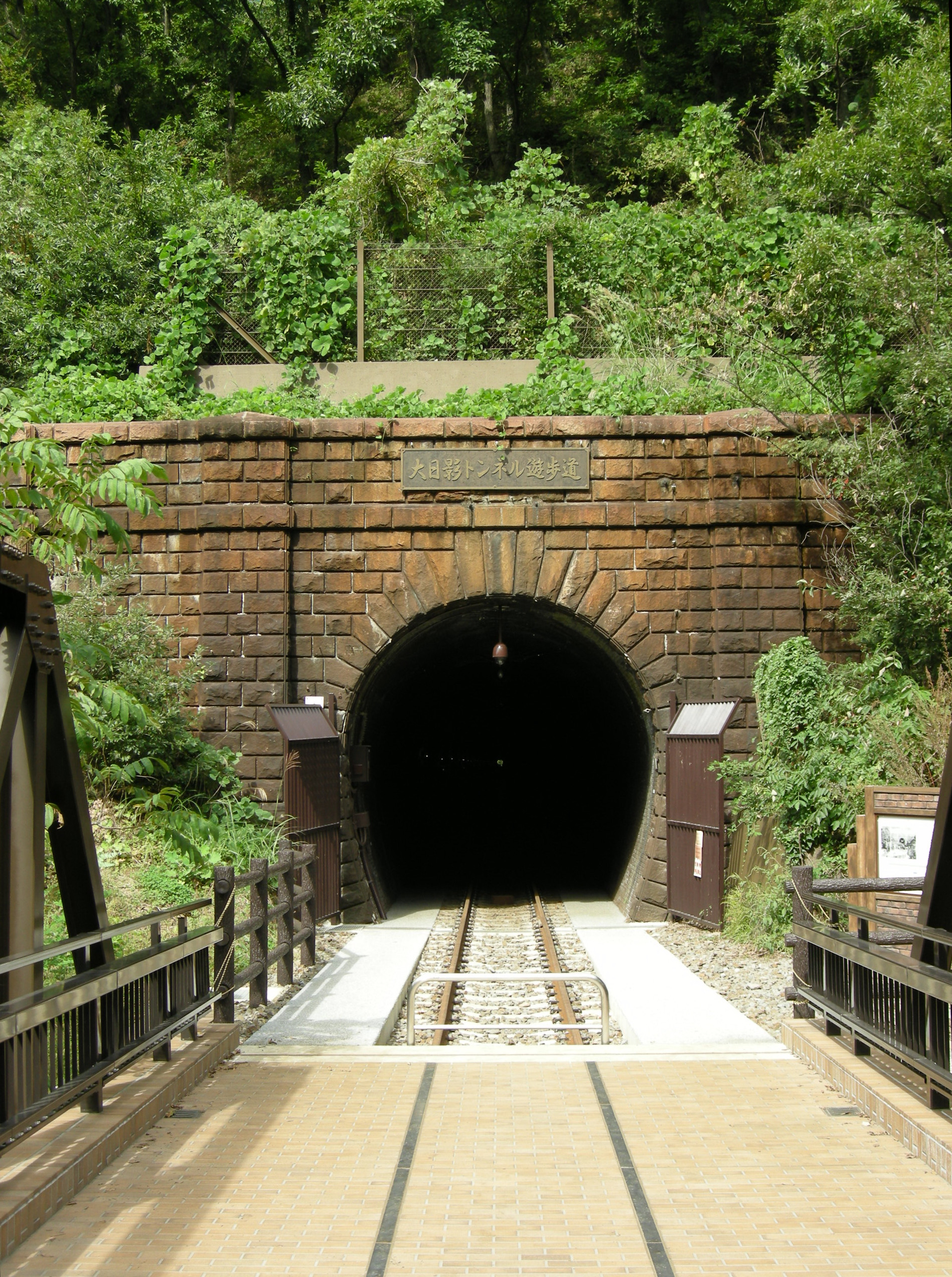
- South entrance to the tunnel
- Interactive map of Ōhikage Tunnel

Overview
- Line: Chūō Main Line
- Location: Kōshū, Yamanashi
- Coordinates: 35°39′40.45″N 138°45′32.18″E

Operation
- Opened: 1906
- Closed: 1997
- Operator: Central Japan Railway Company
- Character: Passengers and freights

Technical
- Line length: 1,376 m (4,514 ft)

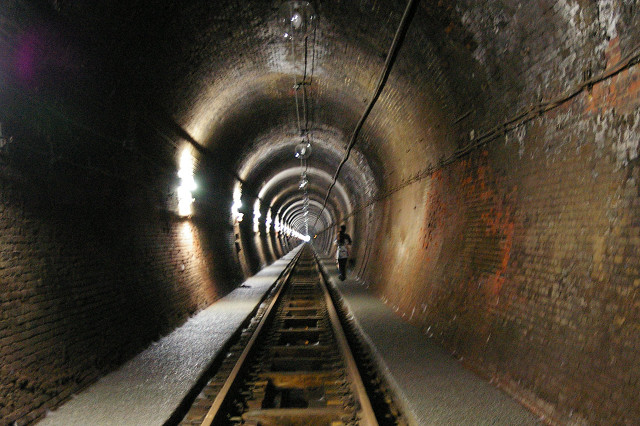
Inside the tunnel

The Ōhikage Tunnel (大日影トンネル) is a preserved railway tunnel located near Katsunuma-budōkyō on the Chūō Main Line in Kōshū, Yamanashi Prefecture, Japan.

== Description ==
The Ōhikage Tunnel was constructed from 1896 as part of the overall construction of the Chūō Main Line. It was faced with brick and opened for traffic in 1903. The tunnel is located between Kai-Yamato and Katsunuma-budōkyō Station, with the northern exit located very near the latter.

The gradual increase in railway traffic on the Chūō Main Line starting from 1931 led to the construction of a double track, which was completed in 1968. However, by the 1990s, the Ōhikage Tunnel was considered outdated and the Shin-Ōhikage Tunnel was constructed as its replacement. The Ōhikage Tunnel was closed in 1997.

After 1997, sections of the tunnel were used to store wine from the vineyards around Kōshū. From 2005 to 2007, renovations were undertaken on various sections in and outside the tunnel to turn it into a tourist destination. In March 2007, the tunnel opened to the public. At the same time, the industrial importance of the tunnel was recognized by the Ministry of Economy, Trade and Industry on its “Heritage of Industrial Modernization List. However, due to water leakage, the tunnel was closed for repairs in January 2012.

== Details ==
- Overall length - 1.367 km
- Width - 3.57m - 3.74m
- Height - 4.90m
- Operating Hours - 09:00 to 15:00 hrs
