= Katsunuma clan residence ruins =

Archaeological site in Kõshū, Chūbu, Japan

- 勝沼氏館跡 (Japanese)
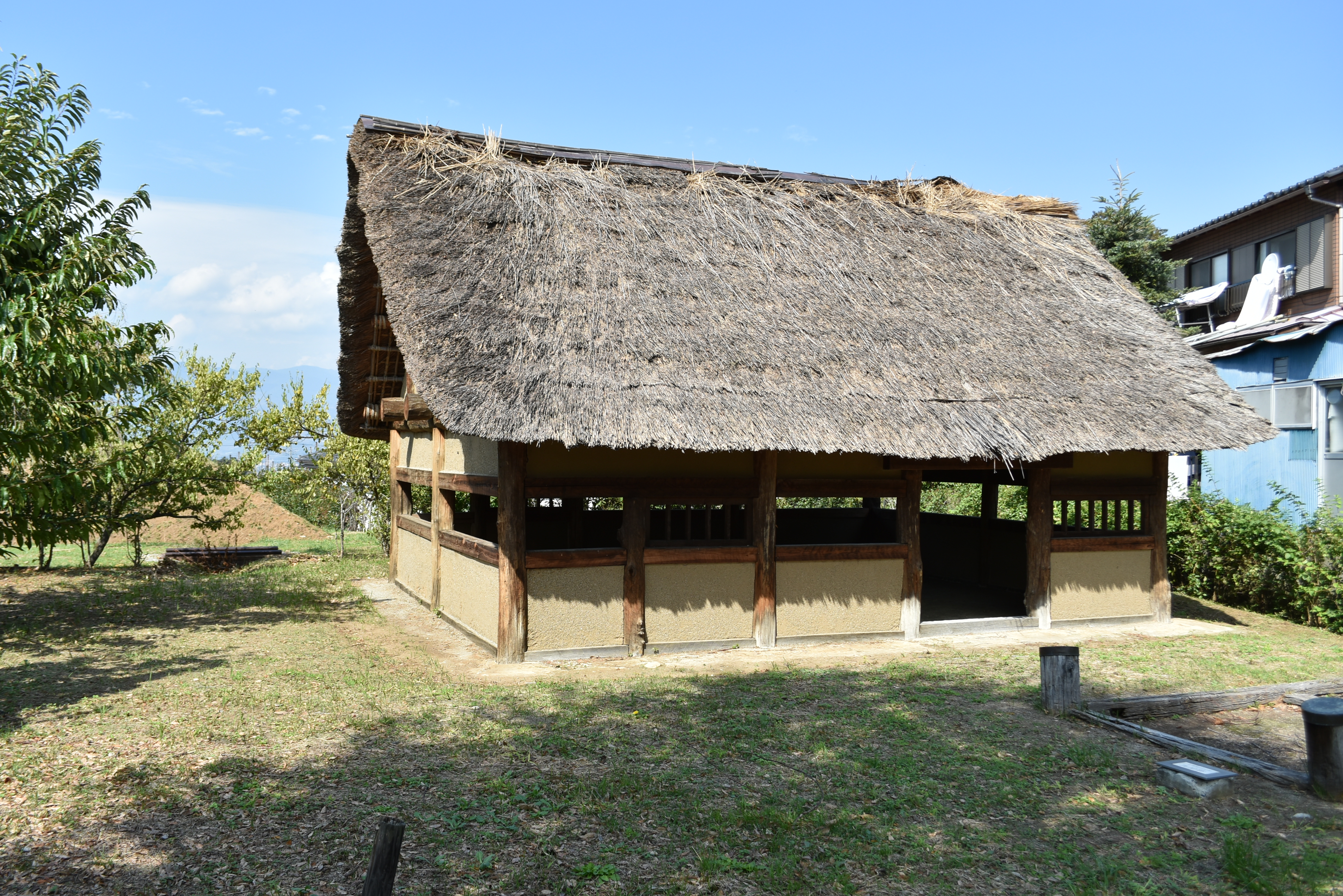
- Katsunuma clan residence ruins

- Katsunuma clan residence ruins Katsunuma clan residence ruins (Japan)
- 35°39′32″N 138°44′00″E
- Periods: Sengoku period
- Location: Kōshū, Yamanashi, Japan
- Region: Chūbu region

The Katsunuma clan residence ruins (勝沼氏館跡, Katsunuma-shi yakata ato) is an archaeological site consisting of the ruins of a Sengoku period fortified residence, located in what is now part of the city of Kōshū, Yamanashi in the Chūbu region of Japan. The site was designated a National Historic Site of Japan in 1981.

== Overview ==
The Katsunuma clan were a cadet branch of the Takeda clan founded by Takeda Nobutora's brother Katsunuma Nobutomo. The clan was annihilated by Takeda Shingen in 1560 during his struggle to seize control of the province from his father. The site of their fortified residence is located in former Katsunuma town, on a river terrace of the Higawa River at an elevation of 418 meters. It strategically located overlooking the old route of the Kōshū Kaidō highway connecting Kai Province with Musashi Province and Sagami Province. The site was discovered in 1973 during construction of a prefectural wine promotion center. An archaeological excavation was conducted from 1973 to 1977 which revealed that the site consisted of a moated compound measuring 90 meters east-to-west by 60 meters north-to-south. Within this compound were the foundations of 23 buildings, along with a temple, blacksmith and reservoir.

A wide variety of artifacts, including Chinese celadon, Haji ware pottery (used for lanterns), Tenmoku pottery, lacquerware, metal farming tools, weapons such as iron gun balls and other items used in daily life. Finds from the midden included many animal bones (deer, wild boar, chickens) indicating that the samurai of this period included animal meat in their diet. Other artifacts included a large number of fish bones from oceanic species, especially horse mackerel, despite Kai Province's landlocked location. A further excavation conducted in 2009 found traces of gold from a small forge, confirming speculation that gold ore from the Kurokawa gold mine was refined in the area.

The site is now a public park, and is approximately ten minutes by car from Katsunuma-budōkyō Station on the JR East Chūō Main Line.

== Gallery ==
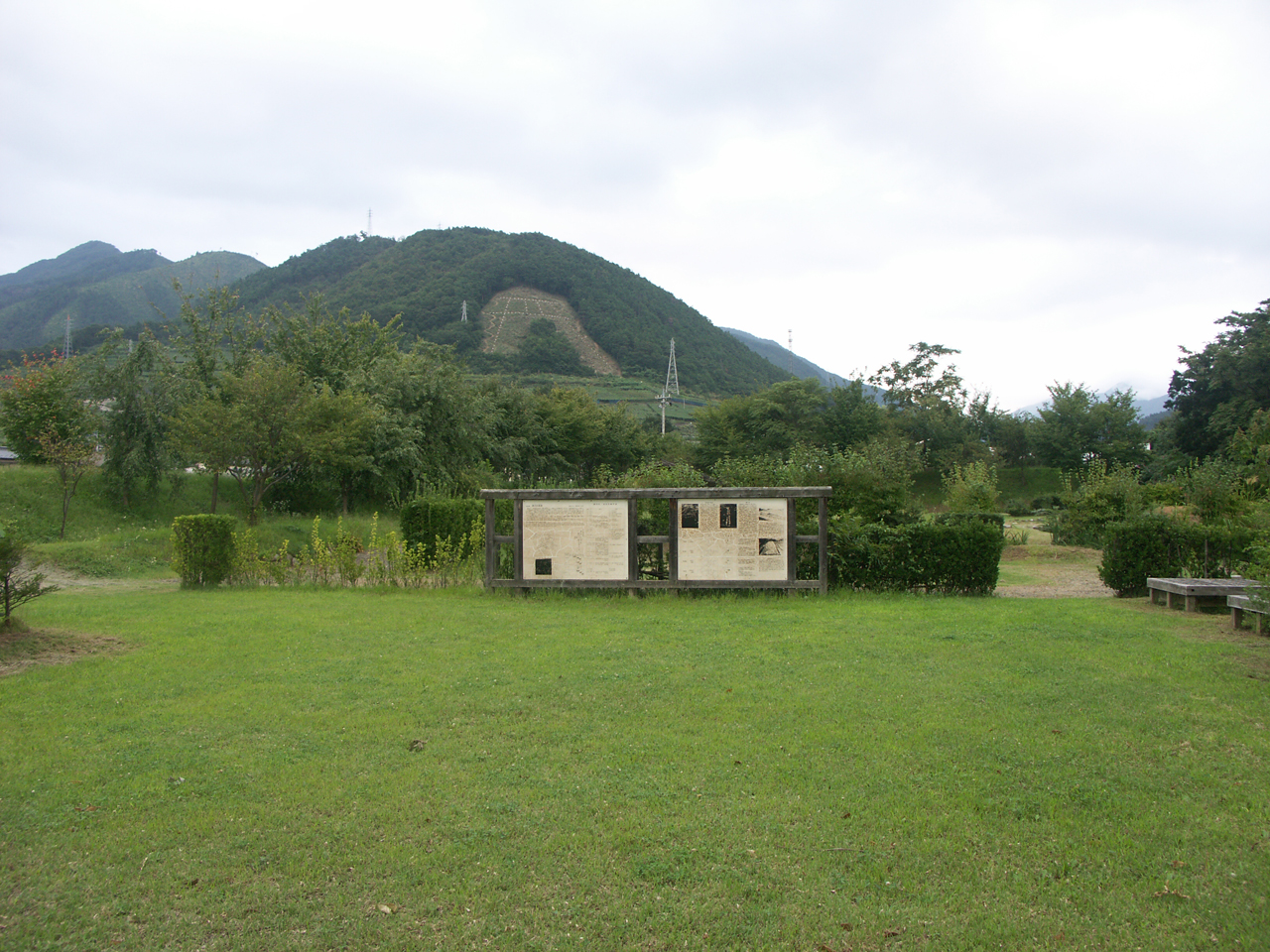
Panoramic view

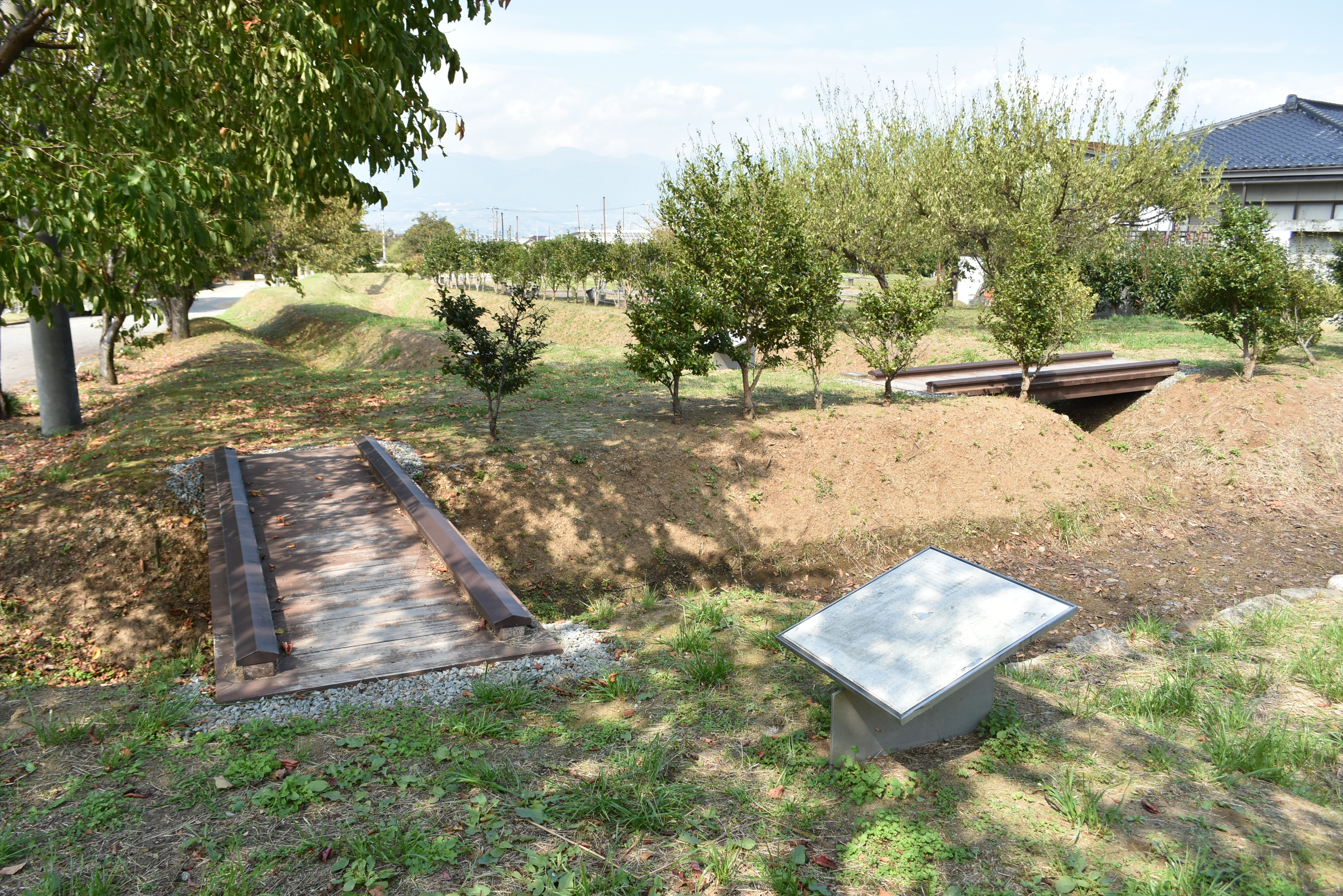
Traces of the inner moat

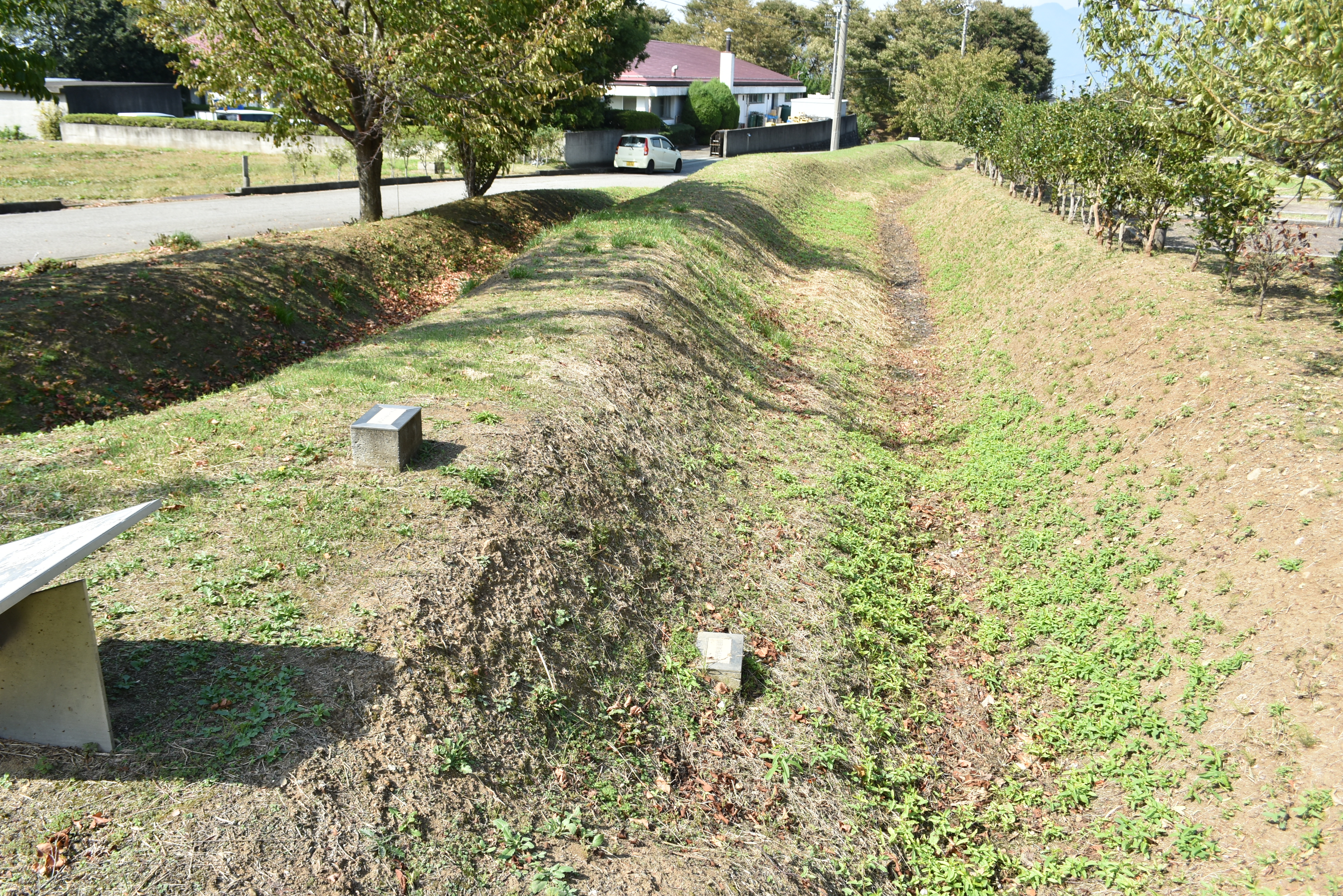
Traces of the inner moat

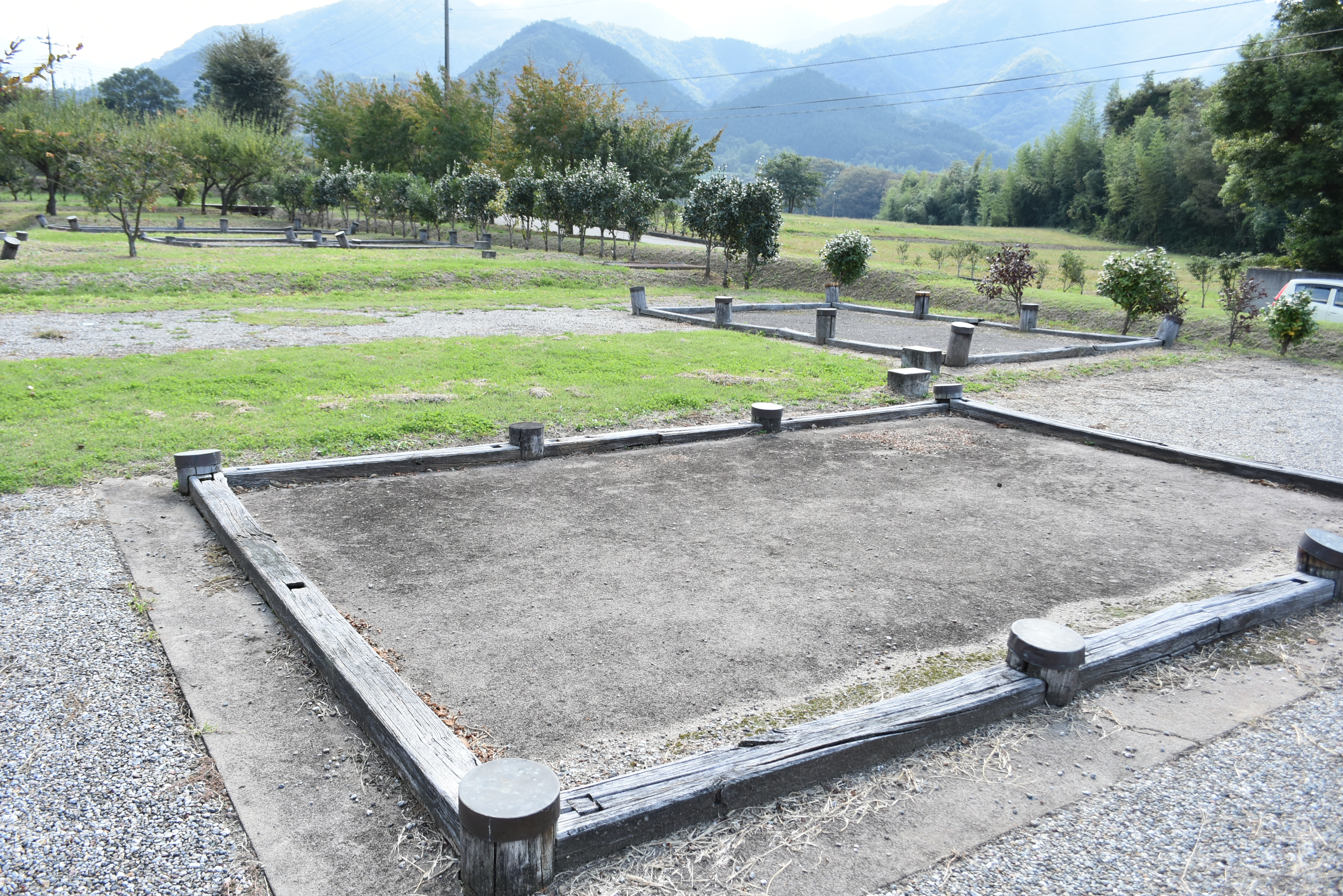
Foundation stones for the main dwelling

== See also ==
- List of Historic Sites of Japan (Yamanashi)
