= Katsunuma =

Katsunuma may refer to:

- Battle of Kōshū-Katsunuma, battle between pro-Imperial and Tokugawa shogunate forces during the Boshin War in Japan
- Katsunuma, Yamanashi, town located in Higashiyamanashi District, Yamanashi, Japan
- Katsunuma Nobutomo (died 1535), Japanese samurai of the Sengoku period
- Katsunuma-budōkyō Station, railway station of Chūō Main Line, East Japan Railway Company
