= Sahashi =

Sahashi (written: 佐橋) is a Japanese surname. Notable people with the surname include:

- Nozomu Sahashi (猿橋 望, born 1951), Japanese businessman
- Shigeru Sahashi (佐橋 滋, 1913–1993), Japanese government official
- Toshihiko Sahashi (佐橋 俊彦, born 1959), Japanese composer
