= Masaki Inayoshi =

Japanese businessman

Masaki Inayoshi (稲吉 正樹, Inayoshi Masaki) (born 1969) is the owner and founder of G.Communication, a Japanese kabushiki kaisha based in Nagoya, Japan. The company is an operator of restaurant chains, juku (cram schools), and eikaiwa (language schools).

== Early life ==
Born in Gamagori, Aichi Prefecture, Inayoshi started working as a local city official. In 1994 Inayoshi first opened a private cram school called "Ganbaru Gakuen"., which later became G.Communication, and quit the city office in 1995 to focus on his business.

== G.Communication ==
In November 2007, G.Communication took over Nova after it filed for bankruptcy in November 2007. Following the April 2010 bankruptcy of GEOS, G.Communication took over 230 schools owned by the company. Another round of closures on October 30, 2010, affected all GEOS schools on Kyushu and most on Shikoku. GEOS is again being downsized as it and Nova are personally reclaimed from G.Education by Inayoshi Capital. Per agreement, schools in Ito-Yokado supermarkets will stay open a few months longer.

On G.Communication's website, Inayoshi comments on his business philosophy, saying he runs the group as its owner because he wants to please his employees, who have invested their lives in him, and their families. To become profitable, Inayoshi said his company has to have the support of the public and franchise owners, as well as good relations with business partners and those involved with the firm.
