= Aeon (eikaiwa) =

Chain of English schools in Japan

Aeon Corporation of Japan 株式会社イーオン
- Type: Kabushiki kaisha
- Industry: Language instruction
- Founded: Tokushima, Japan (1973)
- Headquarters: Okayama, Japan
- Key people: Kiyoshi Aki (Chairman and CEO)
- Website: http://www.aeonet.com/ http://www.aeonet.co.jp (in Japanese)

Aeon (株式会社イーオン, Kabushikigaisha Īon) is a chain of English conversation teaching companies in Japan. It is considered one of the historical "Big Four" eikaiwa schools. The company operates 320 branch schools throughout Japan, and has recruitment offices in New York City and Los Angeles. In November 2013 it was reported that Aeon had approximately 100,000 students studying English.

== History ==
In 1973, university classmates Kiyoshi Aki and Tsuneo Kusunoki founded the company AMVIC. The name was a portmanteau of the phrase "AMbition and VICtory." The company would focus on foreign language studies. AMVIC International was later split into two divisions in 1989, as the former partners developed differing visions of the company's future. Aki's company became Aeon, focusing on language learning in Japan. He remains Aeon's chairman as of 2010. Kusunoki's company became GEOS, focusing on global language learning. GEOS and Aeon remained competitors until April 2010 when GEOS filed for bankruptcy protection.

In 2018, Aeon joined the KDDI company umbrella. With the merger, Aeon began using KDDI's AI systems to promote student learning. They continue to use AI technology with their Aeon NET Campus App.

Aeon also partnered with the Ministry of Education, Culture, Sports, Science, and Technology to help train teachers in teaching English in Japan's public school systems in 2018. As of 2020, Aeon has continued to train teachers in partnership with the government.

== Educational services ==
Aeon offers many types of English courses and services. For adults, conversation and grammar courses are available, as well as courses on business English. The company also offers training for various tests, such as TOEIC and J-SHINE courses. The company also provides lessons for young children, elementary, and junior high school students in conversation and grammar skills.

== Employee responsibilities ==
Teachers at Aeon schools have the following responsibilities, as outlined by Aeon's recruiting website. A "40-hour workweek consisting of a standard number of 30+ teaching hours, with the remaining hours spent on office responsibilities. Office responsibilities include, but are not limited to interviewing prospective students, recommending texts, counseling students, completing progress reports, and greeting students in the lobby", "actively participating in all meetings, workshops and AEON-related campaigns" and contributing to a positive work environment while encouraging students. Teachers usually work from Tuesdays through Saturdays, depending on local school hours and weekly schedules.

Aside from teaching positions, the company also employs emergency teachers who travel and assist at various schools, "corporate division" teachers who teach at various business offices, trainers, curriculum development staff, recruiters, and other forms of management staff.

== Company structure ==
Aeon's corporate headquarters are in Okayama. Its operations are divided into three regions.

Region	Areas covered	Number of schools	Headquarters	Regional manager
East Japan	Hokkaidō, Tōhoku, Kantō, Kōshin'etsu and Kansai	149	Shinjuku	Yoshikazu Miyake
Central Japan	Tōkai, Chūbu, Hokuriku, Kyūshū and Okinawa	71	Nagoya	Kiyoshi Aki
West Japan	Chūgoku and Shikoku	26	Okayama	Masashi Satō

Aeon also has a subsidiary named Aeon Amity which offers classes to children and students up to high school age. The Amity group operates 85 schools throughout Japan.

Aeon is a member of the Japan Association for the Promotion of Foreign Language Education (全国外国語教育振興協会, zenkoku gaikokugo kyōiku shinkō kyōkai).

As of December 2010, Aeon held total assets of 28.7 billion yen. Its total revenue for 2009 was 24.8 billion yen.

On 5 February 2010, Aeon announced that it would henceforth be depositing 50% of the lesson fees that students pay up-front into a trust account managed by the Mizuho Trust Bank. These funds would be held on behalf of the students, to be refunded in the event the company could no longer continue operating. The initial amount paid into the trust account was 4.3 billion yen.
