= Nova Corp =

Nova Corp can refer to:

- Nova Corps, a fictional intergalactic military/police force appearing in Marvel Comics
- Nova (eikaiwa), a large eikaiwa school (private English teaching company) in Japan
