= Nobutomo =

- Gender: Male

Origin
- Origin: Japanese
- Meaning: Different meanings depending on the kanji used

Nobutomo (written: 信友) is a masculine Japanese given name. Notable people with the name include:

- Akiyama Nobutomo (秋山 信友) (1531–1575), Japanese samurai
- Anayama Nobutomo (穴山 信友) (1506–1561), Japanese samurai
- Katsunuma Nobutomo (勝沼 信友) (died 1535), Japanese samurai
- Oda Nobutomo (織田 信友) (1516–1555), Japanese daimyō
