= G.Communication =

- Company type: Public
- Industry: Language instruction
- Founded: Okazaki, Japan (1998)
- Headquarters: Nagoya, Japan
- Key people: Masaki Inayoshi (稲吉 正樹, Inayoshi Masaki) Founder
- Net income: 2,786 million JPY
- Website: g-com.jp

G.Communication, also abbreviated as G.com, is a Japanese kabushiki kaisha based in Nagoya, Japan. The company is an operator of restaurant chains, juku (cram schools), and eikaiwa (language schools).

== History ==
G.Communication Group was started in Aichi, Japan. Masaki Inayoshi first opened a private cram school in 1994 called "Ganbaru Gakuen". G.Communication grew rapidly due to aggressive mergers and acquisitions. Headed by Inayoshi, the firm expanded its business by purchasing shares of restaurant chains, including sushi chain Heiroku in July 2005 and Yakinikuya Sakai Co. in May 2007.

The aggressive strategy has at times caught the attention of the government. In October 2006, the Financial Services Agency ordered G.Communication to pay a ¥390,000 fine for insider trading after purchasing shares of one of its subsidiaries that was planning a capital increase before the information became public. In 2006, it acquired all of the shares of an English-language school chain in Hokkaido with some 50 schools, merging it into G.Education, part of the group.

In November 2007, G.Communication took over Nova after it filed for bankruptcy in November 2007. Following the April 2010 bankruptcy of GEOS, G.Communication also took over 230 schools owned by the company.

On 1 October 2010, Nova's 490 locations nationwide and GEOS's 167 were sold by G.Education to Inayoshi Capital, owned by G.Education founder Masaki Inayoshi.

As of February 1, 2012 Nova was sold to Jibun Mirai Associe Co Ltd. G.Communication still owns some GEOS operations outside Japan, located in Singapore, Hong Kong, Taipei, and Thailand.

== Criticisms ==
Criticism of the company has been made regarding: 'disorganization and putting profit before quality and teacher's rights'.
