= Ministry of International Trade and Industry =

Agency of the Government of Japan

Coordinates: 35.672°N 139.751°E

Ministry of International Trade and Industry (MITI)
- 通商産業省; Tsūshō-sangyō-shō

Agency overview
- Formed: May 1949
- Preceding agency: Ministry of Commerce and Industry
- Dissolved: January 6, 2001
- Superseding agency: Ministry of Economy, Trade and Industry
- Jurisdiction: Japan
- Parent agency: Government of Japan

The Ministry of International Trade and Industry (通商産業省, Tsūshō-sangyō-shō; MITI) was a ministry of the Government of Japan from 1949 to 2001. The MITI was one of the most powerful government agencies in Japan and, at the height of its influence, effectively ran much of Japanese industrial policy, funding research and directing investment. In 2001, MITI was merged with other agencies during the Central Government Reform to form the newly created Ministry of Economy, Trade and Industry (METI).

== Pre-MITI Industrial Agencies ==
As a part of Western-style reforms after the Meiji Restoration, the Japanese government founded a Ministry of Agriculture and Commerce. Due to the surge in exports and economic activity of World War I in 1918, the Imperial Diet began to debate splitting the ministries so that they could more effectively control the economy. The long economic recession following the war eventually saw the Imperial Diet decide to split the two ministries into a Ministry of Agriculture and Forestry and a Ministry of Commerce and Industry, respectively in 1925.

MCI administered the Important Industries Control Act of 1931, which allowed Japanese industries to form cartels to fix export prices and efficiently organize among themselves. By the mid-1930s, MCI was one of the most powerful economic actors in the country, with the 1938 National General Mobilization Law giving them sweeping authorities to control resources, capital, wages, and labor. In 1943 in the midst of World War II, MCI transformed into the Munitions Ministry.

After the Japanese surrender in August 1945, the Munitions Ministry reorganized itself back into MCI to avoid scrutiny from the Americans. The ensuing allied occupation of Japan surprisingly saw little change come to the economic bureaucracy of MCI.

== History ==
MITI was created with the split of the Ministry of Commerce and Industry in May 1949 and given the mission for coordinating international trade policy with other groups, such as the Bank of Japan, the Economic Planning Agency, and the various commerce-related cabinet ministries. At the time it was created, Japan was still recovering from the economic disaster of World War II. With inflation rising and productivity failing to keep up, the government sought a better mechanism for reviving the Japanese economy.

MITI has been responsible not only in the areas of exports and imports but also for all domestic industries and businesses not specifically covered by other ministries in the areas of investment in plant and equipment, pollution control, energy and power, some aspects of foreign economic assistance, and consumer complaints. This span has allowed MITI to integrate conflicting policies, such as those on pollution control and export competitiveness, to minimize damage to export industries.

MITI has served as an architect of industrial policy, an arbiter on industrial problems and disputes, and a regulator. A major objective of the ministry has been to strengthen the country's industrial base. It has not managed Japanese trade and industry along the lines of a centrally planned economy, but it has provided industries with administrative guidance and other direction, both formal and informal, on modernization, technology, investments in new plants and equipment, and domestic and foreign competition.

The close relationship between MITI and Japanese industry has led to foreign trade policy that often complements the ministry's efforts to strengthen domestic manufacturing interests. MITI facilitated the early development of nearly all major industries by providing protection from import competition, technological intelligence, help in licensing foreign technology, access to foreign exchange, and assistance in mergers.

These policies to promote domestic industry and to protect it from international competition were strongest in the 1950s and 1960s. As industry became stronger and as MITI lost some of its policy tools, such as control over allocation of foreign exchange, MITI's policies also changed. The success of Japanese exports and the tension it has caused in other countries led MITI to provide guidance on limiting exports of particular products to various countries. Starting in 1981, MITI presided over the establishment of voluntary restraints on automobile exports to the United States to allay criticism from American manufacturers and their unions.

Similarly, MITI was forced to liberalize import policies, despite its traditionally protectionist focus. During the 1980s, the ministry helped to craft a number of market-opening and import-promoting measures, including the creation of an import promotion office within the ministry. The close relationship between MITI and industry allowed the ministry to play such a role in fostering more open markets, but conflict remained between the need to open markets and the desire to continue promoting new and growing domestic industries.

As late as the 1980s, prime ministers were expected to serve a tenure as MITI minister before taking over the government. MITI worked closely with Japanese business interests, and was largely responsible for keeping the domestic market closed to most foreign companies.

MITI lost some influence when the switch was made to a floating exchange rate between the United States dollar and yen in 1971. Before that point, MITI had been able to keep the exchange rate artificially low, which benefited Japan's exporters. Later, intense lobbying from other countries, particularly the United States, pushed Japan to introduce more liberal trade laws that further lessened MITI's grip over the Japanese economy. By the mid-1980s, the ministry was helping foreign corporations set up operations in Japan.

The decline of MITI was described by Johnstone:

... by the early 1980s, when Western analysts first became aware of MITI, the ministry's glory days were over. In 1979 MITI lost its primary instrument of control over Japanese firms – allocation of foreign currency. The power, that is, to decide who could – and who could not – import technologies. [For example] ... MITI bureaucrats attempted to deny fledgling Sony the $25,000 the company needed to license transistor technology from Western Electric.

However, MITI still continued to benefit industry, especially in semiconductors, where, to overcome resistance to a new technology, it forced every electronic company to have at least one CMOS project going.

The influence of MITI shrank in the 1990s because of deregulation and the collapse of the Japanese asset price bubble, and the creation of the World Trade Organization made it more difficult for governments to protect local companies from foreign competition. The declining significance of MITI to Japanese companies made it a less powerful agency within the bureaucracy, and by the end of the 20th century, it was folded into a larger body. In 2001, it was reorganized into the Ministry of Economy, Trade, and Industry (METI).

== MITI's Role in the Computing Industry ==
MITI was a key player in the building of Japan's formidable computing industry, exercising its economic powers to facilitate foreign technology transfers and protect the infant industry. MITI was involved in technology transfer contracts from leading American firms like RCA and Western Electric to Japanese manufacturing firms in the early 1950s. These contracts had to be approved by MITI, which would artificially reduce competition to ensure that Japanese manufacturers would get good prices for the know-how. MITI officials famously laughed at Sony co-founder's Masaru Ibuka's proposal to approve a licensing agreement to produce Western Electric transistors in 1953. MITI eventually approved the license after Ibuka signed the contract behind their back.

In 1957, the Japanese government implemented the Extraordinary Measures Law for Promotion of the Electronics Industry which gave MITI the power to organize economic aid packages for the small industry at its own discretion. In 1959, IBM brought the first transistor based computers to market, which vastly outperformed anything which Japan could produce domestically. After convening a committee of top MITI officials, business executives, banks, and electronics firms in 1960, Japan decided that a domestic computing industry was essential. They immediately acted to grow the industry by raising tariffs and seeking foreign technology patents for domestic manufacturers.

To compete with the massive funding for computer research from the United States' Department of Defense, MITI created the Fontac Project in 1962 and the Super High-Performance Computer Project in 1966 which organized multiple firms to share the costs of developing computers together. MITI also directed NTT, Japan's state-owned telecommunications firm, to make contracts with Japanese electronics manufacturers at above-market rates giving the computer industry another large source of financial resources.

MITI also worked with industry to create the Japan Electronic Computer Company (JECC) in 1961. Funded by low-interest loans from the Japan Development Bank and jointly owned by the top six computer manufacturers, the company bought computers from Japanese manufacturers and rented them to end-users, making Japanese computers more financially attractive to firms. JECC was an informal policy tool of MITI. For example, JECC forced Japanese companies to compete on quality and technology advancement, as price was not an issue for the firm. MITI was able to artificially increase demand using the JECC. As firms got stronger throughout the 1970s, the computing industry's reliance on JECC purchases waned as the industry became stronger and could compete directly with American firms on technology.

In response to the "Nixon shocks" of 1971 and increased competition from IBM's 370 series, MITI reorganized the six leading Japanese firms into three conglomerates of two each. Each conglomerate was directed to pool R&D costs to create competitor computers dubbed the "New Series," resulting in Fujitsu-Hitachi's M series of computers, most famously the FACOM M-190. MITI responded to increased American scrutiny of its non-market trade practices, by nominally opening its economy. It had cut tariffs to zero and eased investment restrictions by 1975, but it kept non-tariff barriers like standardizations and certifications in place to protect domestic industry.

In 1976, MITI introduced the VSLI or Very Large Scale Integration Project, which was a public-private partnership to develop the next generation of semiconductor manufacturing equipment to produce cutting edge memory chips. The project lasted four years and included all five major computer manufacturers at the time, with MITI contributing roughly half of all R&D funding. The project was immensely successful, pioneering new technologies like the world's first variable-rectangle-beam system.

== Debate over MITI's influence in the Japanese Technological Industry ==
There have been a number of scholarly texts presenting and discussing different perspectives on whether MITI helped or hindered the growth and development of the Japanese computing and semiconductor industry throughout the second half of the 20th century. Bernstein's review of the book Divided Sun by Scott Callon discusses how MITI's capabilities in implementing industrial policy and partnering with individual firms to influence Japan's technological industry gradually decrease throughout the 20th century, from its height in the 1950-60s to failing to lead research and development (R&D) projects in the 1980s.

In MITI's early days in the 1950s, MITI's technology import policies have had a great impact on individual Japanese firms as well as the Japanese government to catch up with the technological development of the Western countries. Even if MITI's technology import policies have been described by Lynn as being one of, if not the most restrictive sets of policies in the world, these policies have conferred multiple benefits but also multiple drawbacks for the development of Japan's technological industry. MITI's close management of Japanese firms' partnership with foreign firms has helped lower royalty payments that the Japanese firms were required to sign an agreement with an international partner. Because of MITI's presence, they are able to pool in different international agreements and send those that have higher royalty fees back to each individual firm for further renegotiation. MITI's presence further deters international firms from signing agreements that allow them substantial equity within the Japanese company, and prevents Japan from continuing to be independent of foreign technological industries.

A notable example of a foreign firm needing to compromise and make an exception for Japanese agreements was described by Lynn:

Dupont, for example, which had a strict policy of transferring process technologies only to firms in which it had more than 50% equity, and thus managerial control, was forced to break this policy in the case of Japan.

MITI also exerted influence over regulating the Japanese technological industry. Under its management, MITI has reduced unnecessary firm-wide competition that may overinflate the price of a technology, as well as blocking the possibility of any individual Japanese firm creating a monopoly on their specific agreement. MITI does this by forcing Japanese firms that are dependent on their grants to enter different licensing agreement to, after the agreement has been signed, further license it to any other Japanese firms that are interested in developing that product.

However, Lynn also analyzes and notes instances and cases where MITI's technology import policies have failed in the 1950s-60s. MITI's practice of targeting key industries that its members believe will advance Japan's economy leads them, in many cases, delay applications for partnership grants of specific technologies that they do not believe are a priority, and individual Japanese firms that they do not believe have the experience and the capacity to successfully import those technologies. Lynn brings up cases where MITI has stalled and enforced outrageous terms in different situations, relating to agreements for the importation of Texas Instruments (TI) and polypropylene. MITI has also been accused of favoring bigger firms and discriminating against small firms such as in the case of a licensing agreement between Sony and Western Electric (WE). While acknowledging that MITI's delay has cost Japanese firms to pay higher fees to import those technologies, especially in the case of importing polypropylene, Lynn argues that those case-by-case failures do not reflect a general conclusion that MITI's overall technology import policies have caused harm to the Japanese technological industry.

In the 1970-80s, as individual Japanese firms caught up with the global technological development and no longer lagged behind, it was harder for MITI to force each firm to comply with their industrial policy. MITI's longstanding policy of targeting key industries since Japanese firms have grown to a point where they can privately fund their own partnerships and projects, and foreign partners have demonstrated skepticism and fear of MITI's targeting efforts. MITI's ineffective intervention on Japanese firms' agreements with foreign firms is shown in Irwin's analysis of the US-Japan partnership in the semiconductor industry. MITI's attempt to implement antidumping practices in an agreement to secure Japanese produced semiconductor presence in the global market is described by Irwin as unsuccessful. The main reason lies in MITI's lack of authority and control over the semiconductor industry, that make them unable to enforce Japanese companies to comply with MITI's antidumping policies. Because of this weak compliance, President Reagan decided to impose a 100 percent tariff on Japanese imports in 1987, greatly hindering Japanese firms' presence in the semiconductor industry. Bernstein's review also points out MITI's shortcomings in their involvement in different R&D projects in this period. With the exception of the Very Large-Scale Integration project, projects that MITI financed, such as the Supercomputer project and the Fifth Generation Computer Systems project, have at best achieved mixed results, and at worst, failed to achieve their goals, which is deemed too idealistic and unrealistic. There are evidences that points to some moderate success MITI had with projects in the 1970s-80s, although little. Feigenbaum's analysis shows how MITI has successfully revised the idealistic goals in their fifth generation project into an education goal, with an aim to train the next generation of Japanese engineers, which MITI officials believe they have been successful in that regard. In Irwin's paper, MITI failures are also attributed to the noncompliance of individual firms, and Reagan's tariffs actually pleased MITI's officials because the tariffs provide them with proof that individual firms should have followed MITI's policies.

== Agencies ==
Important MITI agencies include:

- National Institute of Advanced Industrial Science and Technology (AIST)
- Japan External Trade Organization (JETRO)
- Japan Patent Office (JPO)

== Administrative Vice-Ministers ==
Administrative Vice-Minister (事務次官, Jimu jikan) is the highest position in a ministry filled by a career bureaucrat rather than a political appointee.

Office holder	From	To
Takayuki Yamamoto	25 May 1949	31 March 1952
Keizō Tamaki	31 March 1952	17 November 1953
Tomisaburō Hirai	17 November 1953	25 November 1955
Takeo Ishihara	25 November 1955	15 June 1957
Kōshichi Ueno	15 June 1957	13 May 1960
Hisatsugu Tokunaga	13 May 1960	7 July 1961
Kinzō Matsuo	7 July 1961	23 July 1963
Zenei Imai	23 July 1963	23 October 1964
Shigeru Sahashi	23 October 1964	25 April 1966
Shigenobu Yamamoto	25 April 1966	25 May 1968
Yoshifumi Kumagai	25 May 1968	7 November 1969
Yoshihisa Ōjimi	7 November 1969	15 June 1971
Yoshihiko Morozumi	15 June 1971	25 July 1973
Eimei Yamashita	25 July 1973	8 November 1974
Yūgorō Komatsu	8 November 1974	27 July 1976
?		
Naohiro Amaya	29 August 1979	26 June 1981

== See also ==
- Fifth generation computer
- Economy of Japan
- Ministry of Economy, Trade and Industry

== Sources ==
- – Japan
- Chalmers A. Johnson (1982). MITI and the Japanese Miracle. Stanford University Press. ISBN 0-8047-1206-9. "MITI and the Japanese Miracle."
- Bob Johnstone (1999). We were burning: Japanese entrepreneurs and the forging of the electronic age. Basic Books. ISBN 978-0-465-09118-8.
- Andrew Gordon (2023). "Japan's Transwar Political Economy." In Laura Hein (ed.), The New Cambridge History of Japan. Cambridge University Press. pp. 401–431.
- Anchordoguy, Marie (1989). Computers, Inc: Japan's Challenge to IBM. Harvard East Asian Monographs. Cambridge, MA: Harvard University Asia Center. ISBN 978-1-68417-282-5.
- Edward Feigenbaum and Howard Shrobe (1993). "The Japanese National Fifth Generation Project: Introduction, Survey, and Evaluation." Future Generation Computer Systems. Vol. 9, No. 2. pp. 105–117.
- Douglas A. Irwin (1996). "The U.S.-Japan Semiconductor Trade Conflict." In Anne O. Krueger (ed.), The Political Economy of Trade Protection. University of Chicago Press. ISBN 0226454916.
- Leonard H. Lynn (1998). "Japan's Technology-Import Policies in the 1950s and 1960s: Did They Increase Industrial Competitiveness?" International Journal of Technology Management. pp. 556–567.
- Jeffrey R. Bernstein (1997). Review of Divided Sun: MITI and the Breakdown of Japanese High-Tech Industrial Policy, 1975–1993. Business History Review. Vol. 71, No. 2. pp. 346–348. https://www.jstor.org/stable/3116177
