= Sprachcaffe Languages Plus =

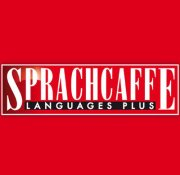
- Logo

Information
- Established: 1983
- Website: www.sprachcaffe.com

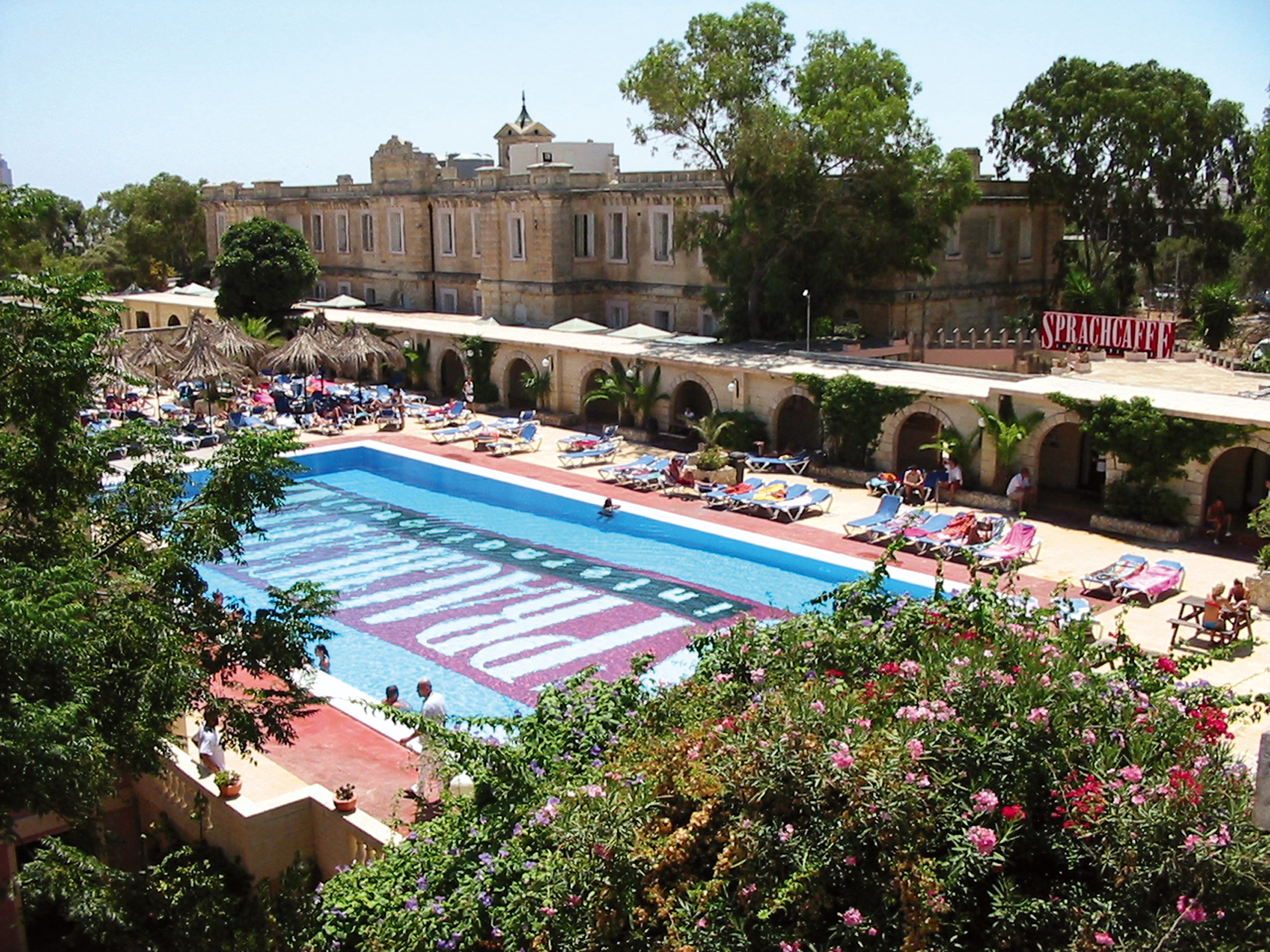
Sprachcaffe Club Village in Pembroke, Malta

Sprachcaffe Languages Plus is an association of 30 language schools offering 7 different languages. It was founded by two Italian brothers, Alberto and Marcello Sarno and established in 1983 in Frankfurt am Main, Germany.

In 2011, the Sprachcaffe network extend its number of school with the acquisition of the Japanese language chain GEOS. In 2016, Sprachcaffe acquired iST, a well established German study abroad agency.

== Specialty ==
Sprachcaffe specialises in offering 'in country' language courses- students learn a second language where it is spoken, however at the Frankfurt centre a number of languages are offered. Sprachcaffe currently has schools offering tuition in English, French, German, Italian, Spanish, Chinese and Arabic. The company even went further and offers courses for professionals or students who want to improve their language level for professional reasons.

Sprachcaffe's flagship school is at Pembroke in Malta, which occupies a large former British army barracks. Italy's oldest private school of languages, the Centro Linguistico Dante Alighieri in Florence has been a member of the Sprachcaffe Languages Plus group since 2012 and is operated as part of the Sprachcaffe family.

The SC Travel Adventures brand offers group tours to through Asia, Africa, Europe, Australia and America. The Sprachcaffe Cuba Travel brand also offers tours, dance and courses in Cuba.

== Locations ==
Sprachcaffe has 30 language schools in Europe, North Africa, Cuba, in the USA, Canada and China. A total of seven major international languages are taught. Many new schools were added through the acquisition of the GEOS North America language school chain. Sprachcaffe has language schools in the following locations: Pembroke, Brighton, London, Devon, New York City, Boston, Los Angeles, Vancouver, Victoria, Ottawa, Toronto, Calgary, Montreal, Nice, Paris, Rabat, Málaga, Madrid, Barcelona, Havana, Frankfurt, Munich, Beijing, Florence, and Calabria.
