= Saburo Shiroyama =

Japanese novelist

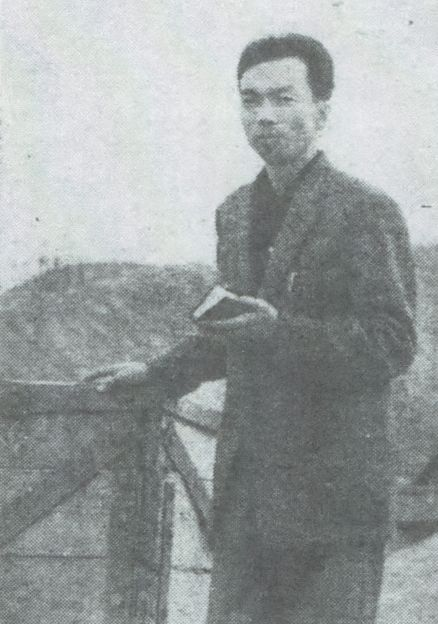
Saburō Shiroyama

Saburō Shiroyama (城山三郎, b. Eiichi Sugiura; 8 August 1927 – 22 March 2007) was a Japanese novelist.

Shiroyama was born in Aichi Prefecture, and studied economics at Hitotsubashi University. He later taught economics at Nagoya Gakuin University. Shiroyama trained as a pilot for the Japanese Navy, but never saw active service. He began his writing career after the end of World War II.

Many of his works concern shoshamen, high-level industry executives within Japanese corporate culture. He is known to have used real people, such as Sahashi Shigeru, as the basis for such characters, though he tried to avoid actually meeting or interviewing these subjects.

In 1957 he won the Bungakukai New Writers award for Export (Yushutsu), which established the economic novel (keizai shosetsu) as a mainstream literary form in Japan. He also won the Naoki Prize for Sōkaiya Kinjō in 1958.

== Major works ==
Some of Shiroyama's most notable works include:

- Export (1957)
- Made in Japan (1959)
- The Takeover (1960) translated by Keiko Ushiro (1991)
- Price Slashing (1969)
- War criminal, the life and death of Hirota Koki (Rakujitsu moyu 1974) translated by John Bester (1990)
