= Kiyoshi Aki =

Japanese businessman

- 安藝 清
- Born: September 13, 1947 (age 79); Japan
- Occupation: Businessman
- Known for: Founder of Aeon Corporation
- Title: Chairman of Aeon Corporation
- Children: Angela Aki

Kiyoshi Aki (安藝 清, Aki Kiyoshi) (born September 13, 1947) is the owner and founder of Aeon Corporation, one of the "Big Four" eikaiwa (conversational English) schools in Japan.

== Founding of Aeon ==
In 1973, Aki and university classmate Tsuneo Kusunoki founded the company AMVIC. The name was an acronym of the phrase "for AMbition and VICtory." The company would focus on foreign language studies.

Later, AMVIC International was split into two divisions. Aki became the head of AMVIC Gaigogakuin (AMVIC外語学院, anbikku gaigogakuin), which provided foreign language training for students. Kusunoki assumed control of AMVIC Eikaiwa (AMVIC英会話, anbikku eikaiwa), which specialized in English language education for non-native speakers.

In 1989, AMVIC International split into two separate companies, as the former partners developed differing visions of the company's future. Aki's company became Aeon, focusing on language learning in Japan. He remains Aeon's chairman as of 2010. Kusunoki's company became GEOS, focusing on global language learning with focus on English language education. GEOS and Aeon remained competitors until April 2010 when GEOS filed for bankruptcy protection.

== Personal life ==
Aki's wife is Italian-American, and his daughter is Angela Aki.
