= Tsuneo Kusunoki =

Japanese businessman

Tsuneo Kusunoki (楠 恒男, Kusunoki Tsuneo) (born June 14, 1947) is the founder of the now-bankrupt GEOS Corporation, previously one of the major eikaiwa (private school for conversational English) providers in Japan.

== GEOS ==
=== Founding ===
In 1973, roommates Kiyoshi Aki and Tsuneo Kusunoki founded the company AMVIC, an acronym of the phrase, "AMbition and VICtory." The company would focus on foreign language studies.

Later, AMVIC International would be split into two divisions. Aki became the head of AMVIC Gaigogakuin (AMVIC外語学院, anbikku gaigogakuin), which provided foreign language training for students. Kusunoki would assume control of the AMVIC Eikaiwa (AMVIC英会話, anbikku eikaiwa), which specialized in English language education for non-native speakers. In 1989, Kusunoki's branch of AMVIC International entered negotiations with Warner Pacific College to assume control of 49% of its physical plant for $6 million, a 30-year lease on the schools facilities, and a seat as a regent of the school.

Not long after, AMVIC International split into two separate companies, after the former partners developed differing visions of the company's future. Aki went on to create Aeon, focusing on language learning in Japan. Aki remains Aeon's President. Kusunoki created GEOS, focusing on global language learning with focus on English language education.

=== Financial crisis ===
Kusunoki was the company's long standing President and CEO until April 2010.

Kusunoki, who has not been present at the press conferences, has said "the bankruptcy was filed by a member of the board and a small group of employees. It is not the will of the company." There has been some serious disagreement among the management at the company for some time. Specifically, those that filed the bankruptcy were board member Kazumi Sugihara and two employees. Normally filing for bankruptcy requires agreement among all the board members, but they filed under a special "semi-personal bankruptcy," something that according to GEOS' lawyer Nobuaki Kobayashi is perfectly legal and valid. Kusunoki's complaints may hold up the bankruptcy process significantly.
