= Rikei =

Japanese noble lady, calligrapher, poet and scholar

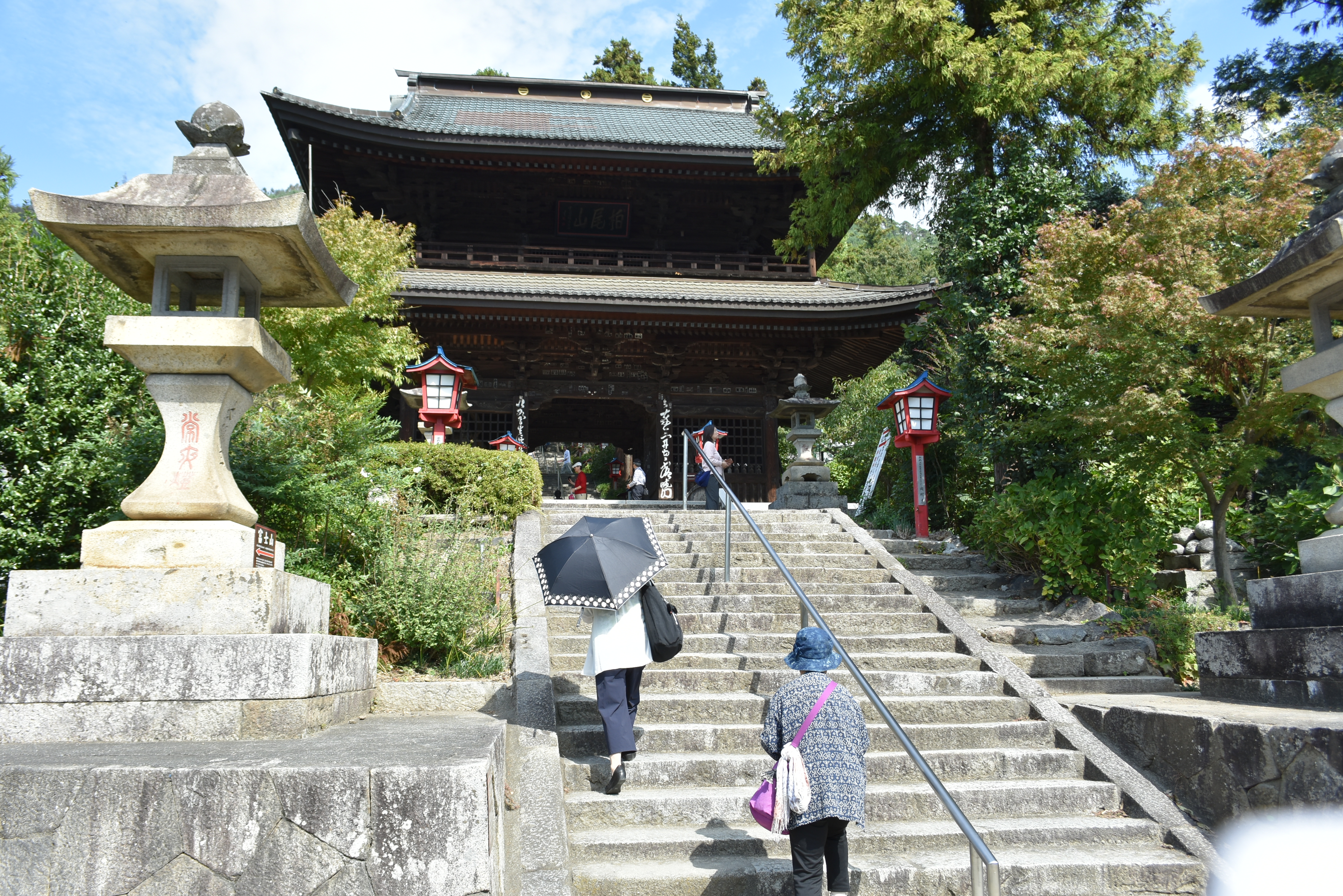
Daizen-ji temple

Rikei (理慶, 1530 – September 23, 1611) was a Japanese noble lady, calligrapher, poet and scholar. She was the eldest daughter of Katsunuma Nobutomo (勝沼 信友), a Takeda samurai and retainer of the Sengoku period with Takeda lineage. She lived as a Buddhist nun at Daizen-ji temple at Mount Kashiwao and is most notable for her military history, Rikei-ni no Ki, or "Nun Rikei’s Account."

== Influence ==
In 1582, the daimyō (大名) or warlord Takeda Katsuyori (武田 勝頼) rebelled against the rival Hojo clan, but because of his poor leadership skills, he was defeated by a reinforcing combined army led by lord Oda Nobunaga and Tokugawa Ieyasu. He, his young formal wife, and about ninety of their followers, mostly women, fled to Rikei's nunnery. However, because of Katsuyori's failure as an administrator, no one wanted to welcome or pity this retinue. Rikei, on the other hand, pitied their fate. She was familiar with the style of military tales, so she wrote Rikei-ni no Ki or "The Nun Rikei's Account" to honor them so that their names at least could remain.

The Rikei-ni no Ki is one of three military accounts written by women in this time period (1600s), the others being the Oan Monogatari and the Okiku Monogatari. Rikei's work starts with a description of the Takeda clan's genealogy, and then she moves into a description of the killings and ritualistic suicides that the retinue committed in order to preserve their honor and avoid capture and humiliation. She also incorporated a myougouka, or prayer verse, in her account. After describing the death of Katsuyori's formal wife, she lists seven poems. The beginning of these verses form the acrostic "na-mu-a-mi-ta-hu-tsu," which is a Buddhist prayer that translates loosely to "Glory to Amitābha" or "May they rest in peace.".

== See also ==
- Ono Otsū
