= Nova (eikaiwa) =

Private English teaching company in Japan

- Type: Private (owned by Jibun Mirai Associe Co. Ltd)
- Industry: Language instruction
- Founded: Osaka, Japan (1981)
- Headquarters: Osaka, Japan
- Key people: Nozomu Sahashi (founder, former CEO); Masaki Inayoshi (former owner)
- Revenue: ▼57,064 million JPY (2007)
- Net income: ▼ −2,495 million JPY (2007)
- Website: www.nova.co.jp

Nova (formerly Nova Group) is a large eikaiwa school (private English teaching company) in Japan. It was by far the largest company of this type until its widely publicized collapse in October 2007. Before its bankruptcy, Nova employed approximately 15,000 people across a group of companies that supported the operations of and extended out from the "Intercultural Network" of its language schools. The scope of its business operations reached its peak in February 2007 following a rapid expansion of its chain to 924 Nova branches plus a Multimedia Center located in Osaka.

Nova, known for high-priced lesson packages and later plagued by lawsuits and negative publicity, began to decline in earnest almost immediately after the Ministry of Economy, Trade and Industry placed a six-month ban against soliciting new long-term contracts from students on the company on 13 June 2007. The impending financial crisis facing Nova related to a rapid increase in refund claims, significant drops in sales figures, and deterioration of its reputation, came to a head in September 2007 when Nova began to delay payment of wages and bonuses to staff. The NAMBU Foreign Workers Caucus in Tokyo estimated that up to 3,000 staff had not received their salaries on time. A solution for Nova's failure to pay wages was promised by 19 October in a fax sent to branch schools. On 23 October the Osaka Labor Standards office accepted a demand by unionized Nova instructors to investigate criminal charges against Nova President and founder, Nozomu Sahashi, over delayed and unpaid wages, but Sahashi was ultimately not charged.

It took roughly eight months for the company to reach the point where it filed for bankruptcy protection on 26 October 2007, whereupon the trading of its stock was suspended and was delisted on 27 November 2007. On 6 November 2007 court-appointed receivers announced that Nagoya-based G.Communication would sponsor Nova. Initial plans by G.com were to start with reopening up to 30 schools in various locations including Tokyo and Osaka by the end of November 2007. G.com later sold off its 490 Nova and 167 GEOS English schools on 1 October 2010 to Inayoshi Holdings, with 50 of the GEOS schools slated to join the Nova group under the name "Nova x Geos" on 1 November 2010. As of 1 February 2012 Nova is owned by Jibun Mirai Associe Co. Ltd. On 2 September 2013 Jibun Mirai established a wholly owned subsidiary called Nova and fully reinstated the name Nova.

As of January 2014 Nova operates 310 branches, with 66,000 students. In January 2020, Monogusa introduced the learning app "Monoxer", which will be provided by the company to all school buildings of Nova in the Business Course/TOEIC Course starting in January 2020.

== History ==
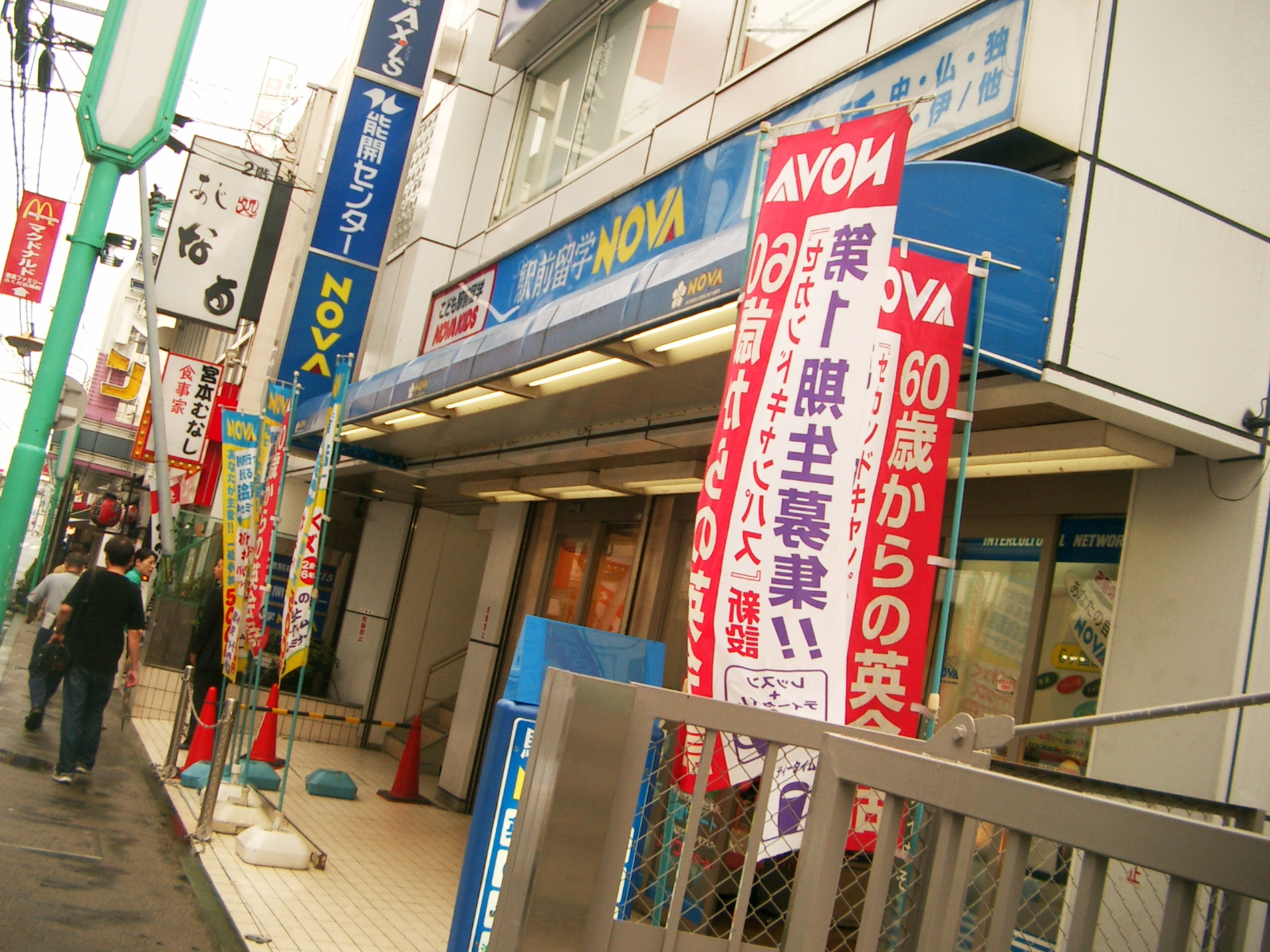
A Nova branch

The Nova Group was founded in August 1981 and was led by CEO Nozomu Sahashi. Nova's corporate headquarters were in Osaka. The company was the largest employer of foreign nationals in Japan, employing 7,000 foreign workers, 5,000 of whom were employed as language instructors. Each year, Nova hired between 2,500 and 2,600 foreign teachers to replace those who had left. Although instructors were not required to have actual educational training, the company provided a salary bonus for teachers with an accredited TEFL certificate, any master's degree, or a degree in education. Teachers were admitted directly after university graduation with any degree that allowed them to obtain a work visa. Instructors from participating countries who can obtain a Working Holiday Visa were admitted without a degree. They worked fewer hours and earned less pay than full-time instructors.

Sahashi originally established the company with two high school graduates from Sweden and Canada whom he met via a friend who was studying abroad in Paris. They opened the first classroom in Shinsaibashi, Osaka. The name Nova (an astronomical term for a stellar explosion) was chosen by Sahashi as he felt it would appeal to prospective students. In November 1996, Nova's initial public offering was met with several demonstrations in front of Nomura Securities and the Tokyo Stock Exchange. A complaint filed by The Nova Union stated that the company was violating Japanese exchange laws by falsely stating that there were no unions at Nova, nor pending litigation, and that labor relations between the company and its employees were amicable and untroubled.

Since 1997, Nova steadily expanded the number of its schools as its business grew, going from 239 schools to 623 in 2004. By 2002, Nova had captured 50% of total market share by revenue (61.5 billion yen) and in 2003, Nova had gained a 66% market share by number of students, some 410,000 students in total. However 2005 saw Nova lose ground in total sales revenue.

The company was in the red in the business year ending in March for the second consecutive year, posting net losses of 3 billion yen in fiscal 2005 and 2.4 billion yen in fiscal 2006 after a failed expansion attempt. The number of students fell to 418,000 by the end of March: down 12.1 percent from a year earlier. On 20 September 2007, NOVA announced it was considering a large-scale closure of up to 200 branches.

=== Events after the collapse ===
The announcement of court protection and the admission that operations at all Nova branches would be temporarily shut down shocked the estimated 420,000 Nova students as some of them had paid their tuition in advance and feared their money might not be refunded. The Ministry of Economy, Trade and Industry asked the Japan Association for the Promotion of Foreign Language Education, an industry body, to call on its member schools to accept Nova students. METI also requested consumer credit companies not to seek loan repayments from the 20% of Nova students who paid their tuition with loans because Nova has ceased operations and they could not take lessons.

Nova President Nozomu Sahashi, missing since before his dismissal, was officially replaced by three board members, including co-founder Anders Lundqvist. The Osaka Labor Bureau, a local branch of the Ministry of Health, Labor and Welfare, launched a consulting counter with five interpreters for foreign Nova instructors.

The immediate effect of collapse of Nova was the sudden unemployment of approximately 4,500 foreign teaching staff and 2,000 Japanese workers. The desperate situation of many of the foreign teachers raised concerns over an apparent lack of an adequate safety net for foreign workers in Japan. Some teachers could not even afford a plane ticket home. The Australian and British embassies in Japan set up information pages on their websites to assist their nationals and Qantas airline offered reduced airfares for Australian Nova employees wishing to return to Australia. The collapse led to huge increases in union membership, particularly in NUGW Tokyo Nambu (future Tozen Union) and in Osaka's General Union. The unions had a chance to appeal their case to the public thanks to extensive coverage on TV, radio and newspaper. The unexpected influx of ex-Nova teachers on the job market led to immense numbers of applicants vying for a much smaller number of employment opportunities. Language education companies, even some outside Japan, attempted to tap into this labor force.

The publicity, generated by the collapse in Japan and in other countries, also threatened to damage the reputation of Japan's foreign language industry although the Japanese government attempted to minimize the damage by pledging non-specific support despite remaining essentially uninvolved in the chaotic collapse. The government did set up a special consultation booth briefly at the Hello Work public employment office in Shinjuku in Tokyo for Nova instructors seeking advice but maintained its distance as its position was that the bankruptcy of Japan's biggest foreign language school chain was a private sector matter.

Although Nova was unable to successfully attract a corporate partner to stave off the bankruptcy, twelve companies quickly applied for sponsorship to rebuild Nova Corp, some of which made specific proposals to turn around the company.

=== Restructuring ===
On 7 November 2007, G.Communication, a Nagoya-based operator of cram schools, language schools and restaurant chains announced it had been unofficially selected to take over part of the operations of failed Nova Corp before any official decision by the board of trustees had been released. G.Education Co, a subsidiary of G.communication, would take over part of Nova's operations in addition to the chain of EC Inc English conversation schools of Hokkaido it runs. Nova Corp assets not absorbed by G.communication would be liquidated by court appointed administrators. The administrators claimed they had to select a sponsor quickly even before the court approved Nova's reconstruction program as value of Nova corporate assets were eroding each day as employees and students left.

Initial plans by G.communication were to start with reopening the Nova Kurokawa school in Nagoya's Kita Ward with the intention to reopen up to 30 schools in various locations including Tokyo & Osaka by the end of November 2007. G.communication held several briefing sessions for Nova employees and foreign teachers about their reemployment. Although many of the foreign teachers were not subsequently re-employed, G.communication has opened 465 schools as of January 2010.

G.communication Co. sold off the Nova and Geos chains of English schools on 1 October 2010. An investment company led by Masaki Inayoshi, who formerly served as chairman of G.communication, purchased the subsidiary of the Nagoya-based firm that ran both GEOS and Nova. At the time of sale, Nova had 490 locations and Geos 167.

Nova changed ownership again in 2012, being purchased by Jibun Mirai Associe Co. Ltd. However G.communication continues to operate some Nova schools through its subsidiaries G.networks and G.taste, under license from Jibun Mirai Associe.

== Branches as of 2012 ==
As of May 2012 there are 212 Nova branches operating. 211 are located across Japan: nineteen in Hokkaido, nineteen in Kyushu, ten in Chugoku, six in Shikoku, thirty-six in Kansai, seventy-six in Kanto, and forty-five in Chubu; Nova has one branch located in Hawaii.

== Marketing and services ==
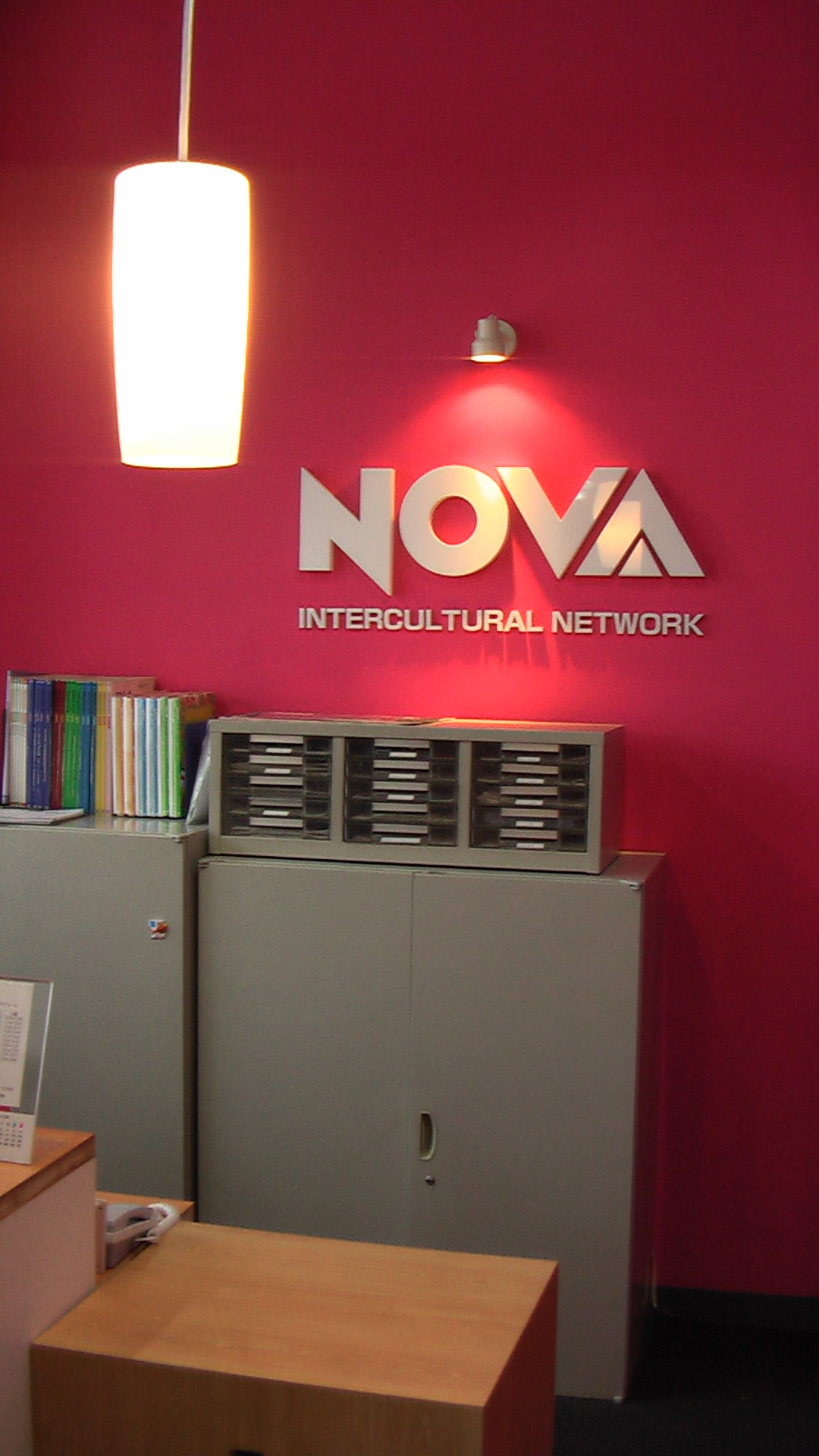
The interior of a new Nova school showing the new design motifs

Prior to its 2007 bankruptcy, the language school chain aggressively operated extensive advertising campaigns in print and on television and had a very high profile and strong brand recognition. Until a short time before its collapse, Nova used an animated pink rabbit (the "Nova Usagi") as the popular face of the company, which appeared often as the focus of Nova's TV commercials and other advertisements. The rabbit appealed strongly to children and became extremely popular. The introduction of "Nova Usagi" merchandise saw sales of over 260 million yen in the first two weeks of availability. Nova partially discontinued using the rabbit in January 2003 after JSPCA animal rights activists lodged a protest over a commercial that featured the rabbit getting its ears ripped off, citing concerns of its impact on children's awareness of death.

Many Nova branches were (and still are) located near train stations, and the company used the term ekimae ryūgaku ("study abroad near the train station": 駅前留学) in its promotional materials. The catch phrase helped Nova to become the nation's biggest chain of English language schools. It similarly promoted its interactive multimedia network as ochanoma ryūgaku ("study abroad from the living room": お茶の間留学).

Nova's success was also attributed to its promises of a foreign teacher, smaller class sizes than its rivals, and an appointment system that allowed students to schedule and attend class at their convenience. However, in 1997, 18 students filed a grievance with the Tokyo Metropolitan Government claiming they were unable to make lesson appointments when they wanted, despite the school's advertisements that its students could reserve classes "at any time". The students said they had purchased hundreds of tickets when joining the school, but found it impossible to use them all by the expiry date due to inflexible scheduling procedures. Nova agreed to a proposal by the Damage Relief Committee to repay a total of 3.8 million yen and said the dispute had been the result of a misunderstanding.

=== Services ===
The company offered English courses for adults, children, business English and test preparation (TOEFL, TOEIC) as well as Chinese, French, Spanish, Italian, and German instruction. Through subsidiaries, the company also offered telecommunications and travel agency services and in-house English instruction, translation and interpretation services for Japanese corporations. While Nova's main product was English language services, the company shifted some of its focus toward China, as 100,000 of its students studied Chinese.

== Instructor employment system ==
- Full-time instructor
  - Five day work week of eight 44-minute lessons per day. Duties may include cleaning or distributing tissues during free lessons.
  - 200,000 yen monthly salary which may vary depending on class capacity. Teachers are paid more for full or one on one classes, less for one or two student classes.
  - Transport allowance included in salary.
  - 10 paid holidays per year in the first 12-month contract. Different schools vary in whether they give public holidays or not.

Instructors are performance graded by both customers and managers.

Customer feedback ranges from scores of 1-5, with scores less than 3 deemed as complaints.

Manager feedback known as ‘manager evaluation’ is based on an extensive set of criteria (more than 20 requirements). Instructors must meet every single criteria to score a 3, the minimal requirement to be deemed a satisfactory instructor.

Instructors with scores of 3 or more, get preferential treatment such as higher pay, transfer and shift change requests.

== Employment and labor relations ==
=== Drug testing ===
In 1994, after two instructors were arrested on drug charges in August and September, Nova asked all 3,100 instructors to sign an agreement to have a mandatory drug test, the results of which would be reported to the police. The drug test only applied to foreign staff. The Osaka Bar Association wrote an opinion that the policy was a violation of the teachers' right to privacy. Nova claimed consent forms had been received from more than 90 percent of employees. According to the union, no instructors were ever required to take a drug test.

=== Shakai hoken ===
In March 2005, after NUGW Tokyo Nambu and the General Union filed a complaint, Nova and other English schools in Japan were investigated by the Social Insurance Agency for not enrolling employees in Social Insurance (社会保険,, Shakai Hoken). The law stipulates that companies with full-time workers who have been in Japan for more than two months must enroll them in the system. Payment is split between employer and employee, each paying about half the monthly premium amount.

In June 2005, Nova amended its working times for instructors and standardized lesson length to 40 minutes, with two minutes either side for lesson planning and student evaluation, resulting in a total lesson time of 44 minutes. Six to eleven minutes of unpaid time was left between classes. As a result of changes to working hours, regular non-titled teachers whose work weeks were reduced to slightly under 30 hours became ineligible for shakai hoken, giving an estimated savings to the company of over one billion yen in annual premium payments. Such employees can register for National Health Insurance (a different system to Shakai Hoken), although this system does not offer coverage for time taken off work due to illness. Nova also offered its own private insurance program.

=== Anti-fraternization policy ===
After six employees were fired for violating a clause in their contracts that forbade interaction between students and instructors outside the classroom, a complaint was filed with the Osaka Bar Association by two employees who were members of the General Union, one of whom had been dismissed as a result of the policy. The two instructors claimed the policy violated their human rights and argued it was racial discrimination since it only applied to foreigners. The clause in Nova's labor contract stated that foreign teachers "should not have a relationship with customers outside the workplace." The Osaka Bar Association subsequently issued a non-binding recommendation that the company drop the clause, saying that it restricted instructors' freedom of association and discriminated between foreign and Japanese staff. The company said the clause was there to "protect both the teachers and the students from trouble, as they do not know each other's cultures and customs."

On 11 December 2005, an Australian who had been teaching in an Osaka Nova branch reached an out-of-court settlement of ¥400,000 and a letter of commendation after claiming that the policy had interfered with his life. The then 30-year-old teacher had been demoted and transferred to another school branch in 2004 when Nova found out he had a relationship with a 21-year-old student.

=== Contested dismissals ===
In November 2004, union supporters gathered outside Nova's Shinjuku Honko school, protesting dismissals of five teachers, three of whom had been working at Nova for more than 10 years. All were members of the Nova union (a branch of the NUGW). The union alleged they were dismissed due to their union activities.

In March 2006, Kara Harris reached a financial settlement with Nova for approximately 7 million yen after she had been dismissed following her request to be made a permanent employee during negotiations with Nova over her sixth consecutive contract. Nova had originally offered her a 12-month extension and, after disputes with her manager over several issues, she sued Nova for wrongful dismissal. Successive courts found that Harris was unfairly treated by Nova.

=== Unions ===
Throughout Japan staff at Nova are represented by various unions. In Kyushu some staff belong to the Fukuoka General union, in Kansai some instructors belong to the General Union. Both of these unions belong to the National Union of General Workers, which is itself a member of the confederation Zenrokyo (National Trade Union Council).

== Government intervention ==
=== Concerns about refund policy ===
On 14 February 2007, the Ministry of Trade, Economy and Industry and the Tokyo Metropolitan Government conducted on-the-spot inspections at Nova Headquarters in Osaka and several other branches. Officials said that several Nova schools failed to give full refunds to students who canceled their remaining lessons after paying in advance. Other clients said that Nova refused to accept unconditional cancellation of lessons, claiming the eight-day "cooling-off" period had expired, and had also deceived students by giving false information about their cancellation procedures. The Kyoto Consumers Contract Network NPO also expressed similar concerns. Reductions in the number of teaching staff since 2004 had created a situation where students found it increasingly difficult to schedule classes, precipitating a substantial increase in complaints. During the February office inspections the Ministry discovered a memo in which Sahashi stated there was no need to stop pushing sales despite difficulties meeting student reservations due to teacher shortages. Consumer centers nationwide received more than 1,000 complaints and queries regarding Nova annually and the National Consumer Affairs Center of Japan says it received some 7,600 complaints or inquiries about Nova's contract and cancellation policies between 1996 and March 2007.

Under Nova's system, students bought points in advance to pay for their lessons. The larger number of points they bought, the smaller the individual class fee became. The case taken to the top court involved a former student who had purchased 600 points at a rate of 1,200 yen per lesson. The student canceled the contract after using 386 points, Nova offered a refund based on a calculation that 300 points were bought, resulting in a price of 1,750 yen per lesson. Nova said the value of the used points should be calculated as having been bought in smaller lots.

The Asahi Shimbun cites an example of a contract for 100 lessons, which would cost 230,000 yen in advance, for a per-lesson fee of 2,300 yen. A contract for 600 lessons would require an advance payment of 720,000 yen, or 1,200 yen per class. But if a person with a contract for 600 lessons canceled after taking only 100 classes, Nova would apply the fee of 2,300 yen per lesson, and the student would receive a refund of 490,000 yen. Such students say the contract for 1,200 yen per lesson should have applied in these cases, which would result in a refund of 600,000 yen.

=== Supreme Court appeal rejected ===
On 4 April 2007, Nova's appeal on two lower court rulings was rejected by the Supreme Court which described Nova's refund policy as invalid and in violation of specified commercial transaction law. The ruling prompted the Ministry of Trade, Economy and Industry to revise the regulations for the specified commercial transaction law to prevent a recurrence of trouble.

On 13 June 2007, LDP Lower House member Yasuhide Nakayama acknowledged he was accompanied by Sahashi and vouched for the company during a meeting with Osaka Mayor Junichi Seki on the morning of 22 May 2006, during the court dispute over the company's refund system. Nakayama, who was elected from an Osaka constituency (of which Sahashi was a member of the lawmaker's support organization) recalled saying at the time that it was "not right by social norms that Nova's refund rule is unacceptable" and explained "it is a politician's job to help out when a supporter is in trouble." Nakayama stated it was not his intention to exert pressure and Mayor Seki said he did not think the judgment of city officials was swayed by the lawmaker's visit.

Industry minister Akira Amari also admitted on 22 June 2007 that he met with Yasuhide Nakayama earlier that year in February shortly after his ministry began investigating the school. Nakayama sought a meeting with Amari to express concern that the ministry might discipline the school over its fee discount system. Amari stated that Nakayama did not try to sway him from punitive action.

=== Business restrictions imposed ===
On 13 June 2007, the Ministry of Economy, Trade and Industry imposed a six-month ban on Nova from soliciting, accepting or finalizing new contracts for long-term courses that last for over a year or 70 hours. The ban was imposed because of issues regarding refunds for the cancellation of contracts. The six months suspension order did not affect those who had already signed up for lessons, meaning that Nova's students were able to continue taking classes.

The ministry also said that Nova failed to comply with a "cooling-off" system provided for in the specified commercial transaction law. Under this system, consumers can cancel a contract without conditions if the cancellation is made within eight days from when the contract was signed. At Nova, potential students first registered their name, address and other data before finalizing their contracts. An official application to the school was made several days later, after the details of the contract are decided upon. Nova told students who wanted to quit that they could not use the cooling-off system, claiming that the day students registered their data was the first day of the contract.

On 15 June 2007, the Ministry of Health, Labor and Welfare said that Nova's English language courses would no longer qualify for government subsidies for those engaged in educational training authorized by the welfare ministry to improve the abilities of the unemployed and other people. In 1999, Nova's 32 courses were approved for the subsidies program. In fiscal 2006, about 4,700 people received a total of 560 million yen in subsidies under the program. Since 1999, around 71,000 Nova students received a total of about 16.1 billion yen in such subsidies. Nova submitted a business improvement plan to the Tokyo government in late June 2007 as required by the METI conditions. Originally instructed to submit the plan on 10 June, Nova postponed the submission until 24 June. The plan was rejected on the basis that it was lacking in concrete details and the planned improvement measures were deemed "insufficient". Nova was requested to submit an additional report.

=== Events following restrictions ===
In an interview in The Daily Yomiuri on 16 June 2007, Sahashi said he was considering offers of capital and business alliances from several companies in various industries, including retail firms, to deal with an expected drop in sales and to restore trust in the company and possibly selling off properties and real estate in Osaka estimated to be worth several billion yen. A capital alliance would have served to improve its creditworthiness and secure operating expenses.

In July 2007, Sahashi met with Hideo Sawada, chairman of H.I.S. travel agency, to discuss a financial assistance as well as a business tie-up but the meeting did not conclude with a decision. Although Sahashi had rejected the possibility of a business affiliation with another English school, Benesse Corporation (parent company of Berlitz Language Schools and provider of home nursing services) announced that it would not be undertaking any business relationship with Nova and saw no synergy between the two companies.

Sahashi indicated the company might have issued new shares to strengthen its capital and that Nova management "[would have to] take responsibility," stating the company would set up an internal inquiry and management reform committee to investigate the scandal, consider disciplinary measures of its executives (including himself), and examine how best to avoid scandals in the future. Sahashi also said that the company would not need assistance from financial organizations During its annual stockholder meeting in June, he apologized for causing the disciplinary action by the government and told the shareholders, "We'd like to regain your trust as soon as possible". Forty-six shareholders attended, and one shareholder who had apparently lost faith in the current Nova management called on them to resign. In response to this call, Sahashi refused stating "If I resign, the company will collapse,". On 14 August 2007 Nova announced and subsequently sold 170,000 new shares on 30 August.

== 2007 financial crisis ==
Indications of an impending financial crisis stemmed from a rapid increase in refund claims that total nearly 5,000,000,000 yen nationwide. A 21 August 2007, article in the Toyo Keizai, Nova was described as repeatedly delaying payment to business partners and banks, falling into arrears for printing costs at the end of July, asking an ad agency to defer a payment. Nova's 2007 first quarter financials showed a loss of 4,300,000,000 yen, a 19% decrease in sales compared to the previous year period, and an overall 19% decrease in recurring profit. Nova cited the decrease in the number of students and deterioration of its image as an explanation. The Asahi Shimbun reported on 11 September 2007, that Nova had made a request to an asset management consulting company, requiring them to return an outstanding amount of 8 million shares that were loaned to them on 30 July 2007. Nova had previously used the asset management consulting company to arrange short term financing with an 11 million share stock loan on 29 July 2007. BNP Paribas had obtained the 8 million shares from a third party on 30 July selling them on 4 September. Commenting on its temporary possession of Nova shares, BNP said it had been the result of the asset management consulting company exercising its option.

=== Unpaid/delayed wages ===
A decline in the stock price following the release of Nova's 2008 fiscal year first quarter financials was preceded by news of a delay in payment of wages and bonuses to some employees. Nova explained that the delay in the monthly wages was due to change in its payment system and personnel management and accounting sections that had not been completed on time and that the summer bonus delay until October was a business necessity that required employee co-operation. On 14 September 2007, Nova delayed wages to many of its teaching staff. Many teachers who had previously resigned never received salary payments from the month of July.

The NAMBU Foreign Workers Caucus in Tokyo estimated that up to 3,000 had not received their salaries on time. According to The Sydney Morning Herald, some teachers said they were owed "thousands of dollars" and others posted messages expressing the intent to quit. Sahashi issued a statement saying it had not been possible to complete all the necessary operations to deposit instructor salaries. As a result of Nova delaying the payment of salaries, the Sankei Shimbun reported that insecurity spread amongst both staff and students surrounding the possible closures of Nova branches. On 20 September one teacher who demonstrated outside of Nova's office in Osaka was quoted as saying "I've already heard about the possible closures of 200 to 300 branches across the country. Nova no longer has the ability to pay the salaries of teachers and staff." By 25 September the cash flow problems had not improved and Sahashi mortgaged 9 million shares of company stock (which included 1.18 million of his own personal shares) for the purposes of raising working capital. Nova Corporation said that they were not involved in planning the transaction. A fax sent to branches after 9 pm on Friday 12 October informed all instructors that salaries would not be met on 15 October as scheduled. The fax promised a solution for 19 October, the day Nova was required to submit its new business plan to JASDAQ after its previous plan was rejected by the Securities Exchange on 5 October for being insufficient.

When salaries were not disbursed on 15 October, union representatives from both Tokyo based NAMBU Foreign Workers Caucus and the Osaka-based General Union approached the Labor Standards Inspection Office to file a report and request an inquest in unpaid wages. The Unions estimated that about 4,000 foreign teachers to salary went unpaid of which about 2,000 employees were still awaiting wages from the previous month that had been delayed since 27 September. The Unions also filed complaints reporting that Nova had withheld member's rent payment and the landlords had tried ask teachers to leave repeatedly.

By 20 October there had been both union organized and wildcat strikes over the unpaid wages. The numerous delays of wages also led individual teachers also to boycott classes. On 23 October, the Osaka Labor Standards office accepted a demand by Nova instructors to investigate criminal charges against Sahashi over delayed and unpaid wages.

One example of the employment fallout after the collapse was the experience of small private school in Higashinari Ward of Osaka, which said 400 people applied in October for a single job opening. The collapse caught some former teachers in such dire financial straits that they had to rely on their former students to feed them.

=== Sahashi's removal ===
On 26 October 2007, Nova's stock was delisted and all branches closed, following an emergency board meeting that removed Sahashi from his position as head of the company.

In June 2008, after a volunteer questioning with Osaka Prefectural Police, a warrant was served and Sahashi was arrested on charges of embezzlement. Sahashi denied charges of wrongdoing and insisted that the 320 million yen reserve fund personally created through a firm affiliated with Nova effectively under Sahashi's control had been set up to refund tuition fees to students who had canceled their lessons.

=== Nonpayment of employee housing rent ===
Foreign staff risked losing company-sponsored housing after Nova stopped paying their rent, which they did well before the official announcements of impending bankruptcy. Paul Dorey, an official of the General Union, said: "Some teachers have already received eviction notices. It’s a total mess."

== Lawsuits ==
The parents of a Nova employee who committed suicide in 2004 filed a suit against the company on 31 August 2007. Their son, age 28 at the time, was employed by Nova to design and supervise the construction of new classrooms. During that period Nova was engaged in a rapid expansion meant to increase the number of Nova branches by 300 in an attempt to reach a total of 1,000. The parents' suit alleges that their son was required by Nova to work up to 80 hours of overtime in one month, and even through the night on seven occasions, despite his inexperience. At one point he had requested to be relieved but was persuaded to stay, which eventually led to overwhelming stress shortly before his suicide.

On 3 September 2007, an Osaka woman filed suit against Nova over a refund related issue. Unlike previous complaints about how Nova adjusted the value of unused lesson points on which the Supreme Court ruled in June 2007, this suit contested Nova's decision not to refund lesson points that were extended after the woman purchased additional points. The woman claims that while Nova explained that her unused points (worth approximately 400,000 yen) from the first contract would carry over after signing a new contract, she was not told that they could not be refunded if she chose to cancel.

In October 2008, approximately a year after the collapse, 24 former students filed a class action lawsuit against accounting firms KPMG AZSA & Co, former Nova president Sahashi, and five of the directors of the company claiming that the rapid expansion was pursued in a reckless manner, and that upfront lesson fees were being misappropriated. The suit further claims that Sahashi and his directors were negligent in their duties to fulfill obligations to customers. It also accuses five directors and two accounting firms of participating in the bankruptcy of Nova by allowing it to continue to use illicit accounting practices. Those accused allegedly inflated profit reports by recording 45% of the paid-in-advance tuition fees as part of its sales. The suit seeks a total of 16 million yen in compensation.

== Lindsay Ann Hawker murder ==
On 24 March 2007, Lindsay Ann Hawker, a 22-year-old British Nova teacher from Brandon, a village near Coventry, was murdered by 28-year-old Tatsuya Ichihashi. Her body was found three-days later in a sand-filled bathtub on the balcony of Ichihashi's apartment in Ichikawa, Chiba. Police went to Ichihashi's apartment after Hawker's flatmates had indicated she had gone there to teach an English lesson, but he managed to escape. He was captured in Osaka on 10 November 2009. During Ichihashi's time as a fugitive, he had altered his appearance, resorting to self-performed cosmetic surgery to avoid detection. He later confessed to the murder and was sentenced to life imprisonment.
