= Shigeru Sahashi =

Japanese government official

Shigeru Sahashi (佐橋滋, Sahashi Shigeru; 5 April 1913 – 31 May 1993) was a Japanese government official.

== Early life and career ==
Sahashi was born in Gifu in 1913 to a middle-class family (his father was a small businessman). He studied law at the University of Tokyo, graduating in 1937, and joined the Ministry of Commerce and Industry (MCI) as a low-level bureaucrat. His work at the Ministry was interrupted by a stint in the military during the Second Sino-Japanese War, but he returned to the civil service in 1941 and rose through the ranks until by 1957 he was in a position of some influence.

== Career at the MITI ==
After the Second World War, the MCI became the Ministry of International Trade and Industry (MITI). In 1961, Sahashi was appointed as director of the MITI's Enterprises Bureau. In this role, he worked with Morizumi Yoshikiko (whom he recalled from France) to adapt and import the French concept of économie concertée, which the two men developed into a system of co-operation between the private and public sectors to revitalise Japan's own economy. Within MITI, Sahashi led the "nationalist faction", which aimed at strengthening Japan's domestic economy.

In 1962, Sahashi proposed and championed a piece of legislation called the Tokoshin Hō, or "Draft Law of Special Measures for the Promotion of Designated Industries". This law (based on French precedents) would have created numerous central controls over Japanese industry, electing industry committees composed of MITI and industry sector representatives to oversee investments and spending within domestic companies. The Tokoshin Hō was strongly resisted by the financial sector and by commercial banks, and this opposition, together with factionalisation within the MITI, led ultimately to the collapse of the proposal.

Sahashi served as vice-minister of the MITI between 1964 and 1966. He was originally recommended for the position in 1963 by the retiring incumbent Matsuo Kinzō. However, Fukuda Hajime, then chief minister of MITI, overruled the decision, appointing Imai Yoshie instead. This breach of protocol caused outrage within the ministry, bringing its day-to-day operations to a standstill; the MITI Journalists' Club compared the situation to the February 26 Incident, in which a group of military officers tried to overthrow the government. Sahashi was not appointed to the role of vice-minister until Fukuda was replaced by Yoshio Sakurauchi the following year. As vice-minister, Sahashi was regarded as a key influence on Japan's post-war economic boom. Three novels about this era feature him as the protagonist, casting him in a similar role to that of the heroic feudal samurai defending the people. One, Kanryo-tachi no Natsu (The Summer of the Bureaucrats) by Saburo Shiyoyama, was later made into a television series.

== Later life ==
Sahashi was a practitioner of aikido, and in 1972 wrote the book Shin no budō (The True Way of the Warrior), which was a diatribe against the increased emphasis on sport within the martial arts. He believed that the true purpose of martial arts was to achieve enlightenment (satori) through training.
