= Kai-Yamato Station =

Railway station in Kōshū, Yamanashi Prefecture, Japan

CO35 Kai-Yamato Station 甲斐大和駅
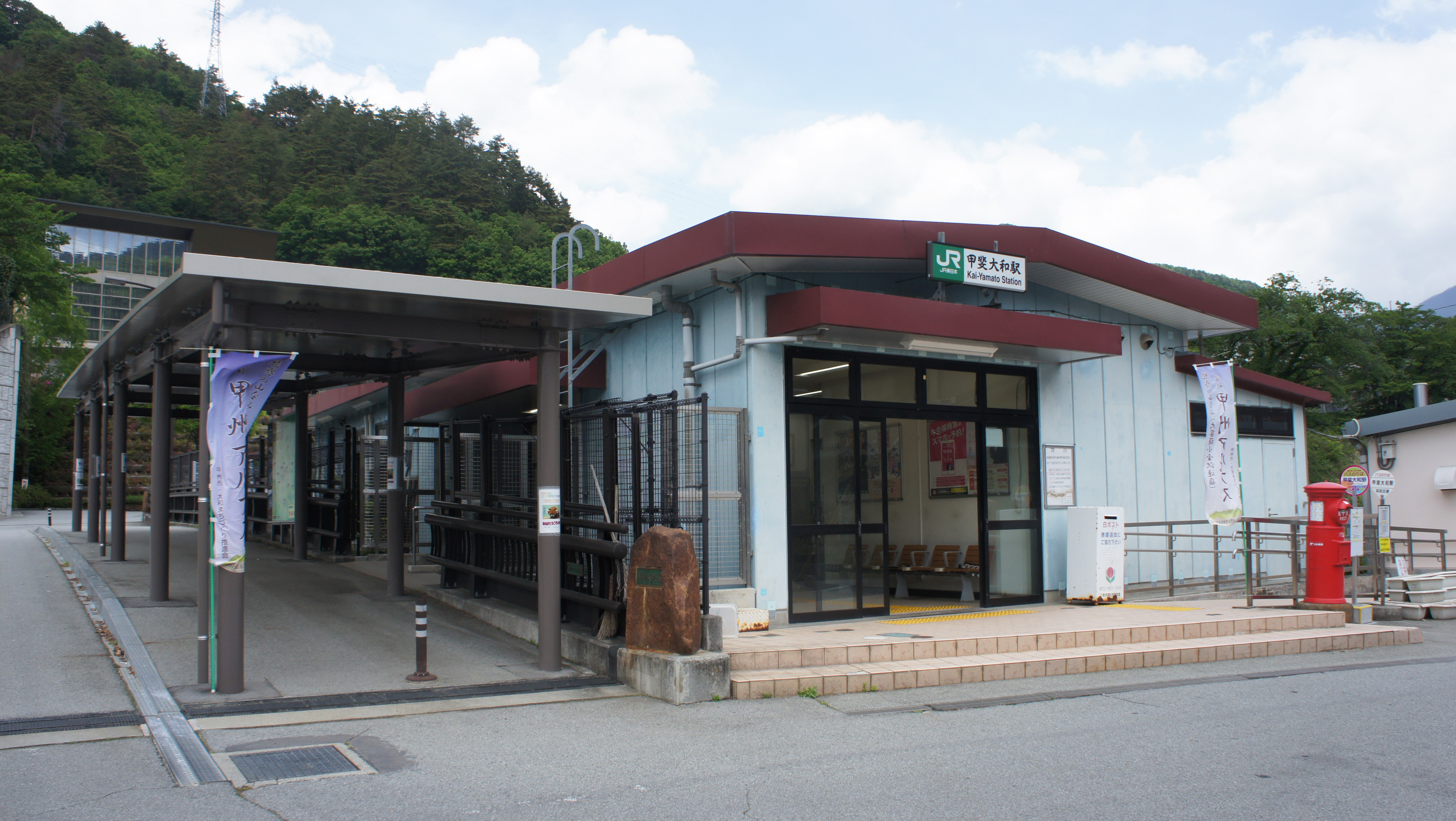
- Kai-Yamato Station in May 2021

General information
- Location: 1716-1, Yamato-cho Hajikano, Kōshū, Yamanashi （山梨県甲州市大和町初鹿野1716-1） Japan
- Coordinates: 35°38′23″N 138°46′51″E
- Operator: JR East
- Line: ■ Chūō Main Line
- Distance: 106.5 km from Tokyo
- Platforms: 1 side + 1 island platform
- Tracks: 3

Other information
- Status: Unstaffed
- Website: Official website

History
- Opened: February 1, 1903
- Former names: Hajikano (until 1993)

Passengers
- 2013: 143 daily

Services
| Preceding station | JR East | Following station |
|---|---|---|
| Katsunuma-budōkyō CO36 towards Shiojiri | Chūō Main Line Local | Sasago CO34 towards Tachikawa |
Location
- Location within Yamanashi Prefecture Location within Japan

Kai-Yamato Station (甲斐大和駅, Kai-Yamato-eki) is a railway station of the Chūō Main Line, East Japan Railway Company (JR East) in Yamato-Hajikano, in the city of Kōshū, Yamanashi Prefecture, Japan.

== Lines ==
Kai-Yamato Station is served by the Chūō Main Line, and is 106.5 kilometers from the terminus of the line at Tokyo Station.

== Station layout ==
The station consists of a single side platform and a single island platform. The platforms are located in a cutting, with the station building on ground level, and accessed via an overpass. The station is unattended.

=== Platforms ===
| 1 | ■ Chūō Main Line | for Enzan, Kōfu, Kobuchizawa and Matsumoto |
| 2 | ■ Chūō Main Line | (siding) |
| 3 | ■ Chūō Main Line | for Ōtsuki, Takao, Hachiōji and Tachikawa |

== History ==
Kai-Yamato Station was opened on February 1, 1903 as Hajikano Station (初鹿野駅, Kajikano-eki) on the Japanese Government Railways (JGR) Chūō Main Line. The JGR became the JNR (Japanese National Railways) after the end of World War II. Scheduled freight services were discontinued from April 1966. The current station building was completed in November 1966. With the dissolution and privatization of the JNR on April 1, 1987, the station came under the control of the East Japan Railway Company. The station was named to its present name on April 1, 1993. Automated turnstiles using the Suica IC Card system came into operation from October 16, 2004.

== Passenger statistics ==
In fiscal 2013, the station was used by an average of 143 passengers daily (boarding passengers only).

== Surrounding area ==
- former Yamato village hall

== See also ==
- List of railway stations in Japan
