= Nozomu Sahashi =

Japanese businessman (born 1951)

Nozomu Sahashi (猿橋 望, Sahashi Nozomu, born September 12, 1951); previously Saruhashi) is the founder of the now-defunct Nova Corporation, previously the major eikaiwa (private school for conversational English) provider in Japan. After graduating from high school, Sahashi went to Paris to attend university and majored in physics although it took him five years to complete a two-year course. The award status of his degree is unknown.

== Nova ==
=== Founding ===
Sahashi was born and raised in Kishiwada, Osaka. He spent several years jobless after returning from France before founding Nova in 1981 with two foreign English teachers. He is the inventor of Nova's particular teaching method, "The NOVA System Concept", which he patented. The Concept is perhaps most comparable to the direct method of language instruction, although Sahashi's method pivots on the interaction with and the repeating of an instructor who was a native speaker. Sahashi thought a native speaker's voice would alleviate the difficulty of the average Japanese brain to distinguish English from background noise, as Japanese and English languages evoked different brain wave patterns. Sahashi had also patented a video phone camera device, a telephone interpretation (translation) system and an at-home medical examination system which provides a virtual consultation room, a virtual waiting room, a virtual nursing room and a virtual individual conversation room depending upon the desired operation although the system does not provide for actual treatment.

=== Financial crisis and downfall ===
Sahashi was the company's long standing President and CEO until 2007. Following governmental restrictions and a financial crisis in 2007, Sahashi was removed as president by an emergency board meeting for failing to adequately explain his "opaque way of fundraising and negotiating with potential business alliance partners.".

According to the Daily Yomiuri, Sahashi made 159 million yen in 2006, even though his company lost 2.9 billion yen. The Mainichi Shimbun reported that Sahashi and his family's stock in the company rapidly declined over a two-week period in September 2007, from holdings of 70% to 20%. It is believed this was done without filing a legally required report. A possible criminal complaint will be filed with legal authorities by receivers for Nova if it is proven Sahashi sold the stock without first filing the required report with authorities. In 1997, Sahashi paid 900 million yen in taxes, the fifth-highest paying taxpayer in the country.

== Criminal investigations and arrest ==
Sahashi came under scrutiny almost immediately after the collapse of Nova when court appointed administrators of the company allowed the media inside the president's luxury suite at Nova's administrative headquarters in Osaka to show "an example of (Sahashi) using the company to benefit himself." The office, a 330-square-meter executive suite on the 20th floor, housed a red-carpeted reception room, private quarters including a dining room with a large-screen TV, a bathroom with sauna, a Japanese-style tea room and a room with a double bed. Sahashi immediately submitted a petition to a local court rebutting allegations that he had used company assets to benefit his own wealth and lifestyle.

In February 2008, police announced they were investigating Sahashi for aggravated breach of trust for using his position to reap profits for his affiliated company, Ginganet, which he also controlled. Ginganet sold the TV-phone sets system to Nova in addition to leasing the Ginganet-managed server for the video-phone lessons. The investigation revealed that Ginganet had illicitly received around 500 million yen in profits from Nova for the use of the server. The bankruptcy administrator had also earlier noted that the price of the TV-telephone devices Ginganet charged Nova was unreasonably high, which could have resulted in Nova losing several billion yen.

In June 2008 police also announced they were investigating Sahashi for possible embezzlement in the course of business for his ordering the transfer of the entire balance of a separately managed employee fund to a Nova business account to allow the payment of refunds to students. Sahashi, who owned the affiliate firm that handled the money transfer, did so in July 2007 to cover operating costs without the approval of employees. Nova employees had made monthly contributions from their pay to fund a mutual aid organization that covered the costs of business trips and occasions of congratulations or condolence. Rarely used, it had an accumulated balance of 300 million yen at the time of the transfer.

On the same day that investigators raided Nova Kikaku's former headquarters, Sahashi along with former president and accounting manager of Nova Kikaku, Toshihiko Murata, were arrested on June 24, 2008 and questioned about misappropriation of funds. While Sahashi acknowledged that the fund was under his control he denied any wrongdoing and on July 30, 2008 he announced his intention to plead "not guilty." Murata, reputed to be Sahashi's right-hand man, reportedly admitted to allegations of embezzlement in the conduct of business. On August 26, 2009 Sahashi was found guilty of embezzlement and sentenced to three and a half years of imprisonment with hard labor. In December 2010 his sentenced was reduced to two years by the Osaka High Court. He appealed against this conviction, but the appeal was rejected by the Supreme Court on December 19, 2012.

== Name change ==
News articles occasionally differ in the spelling/pronunciation of his last name. The confusion apparently began in 2002 when Nozomu Saruhashi became upset after seeing his name printed in an article phonetically rendered in katakana as サル ("saru"), which Saruhashi saw as deliberately emphasizing the first character in his name (猿), which means "monkey." The next day he announced to the staff that his surname was henceforth Sahashi.
