= Ministry of Economy, Trade and Industry =

Government ministry of Japan

- 経済産業省; Keizai-sangyō-shō

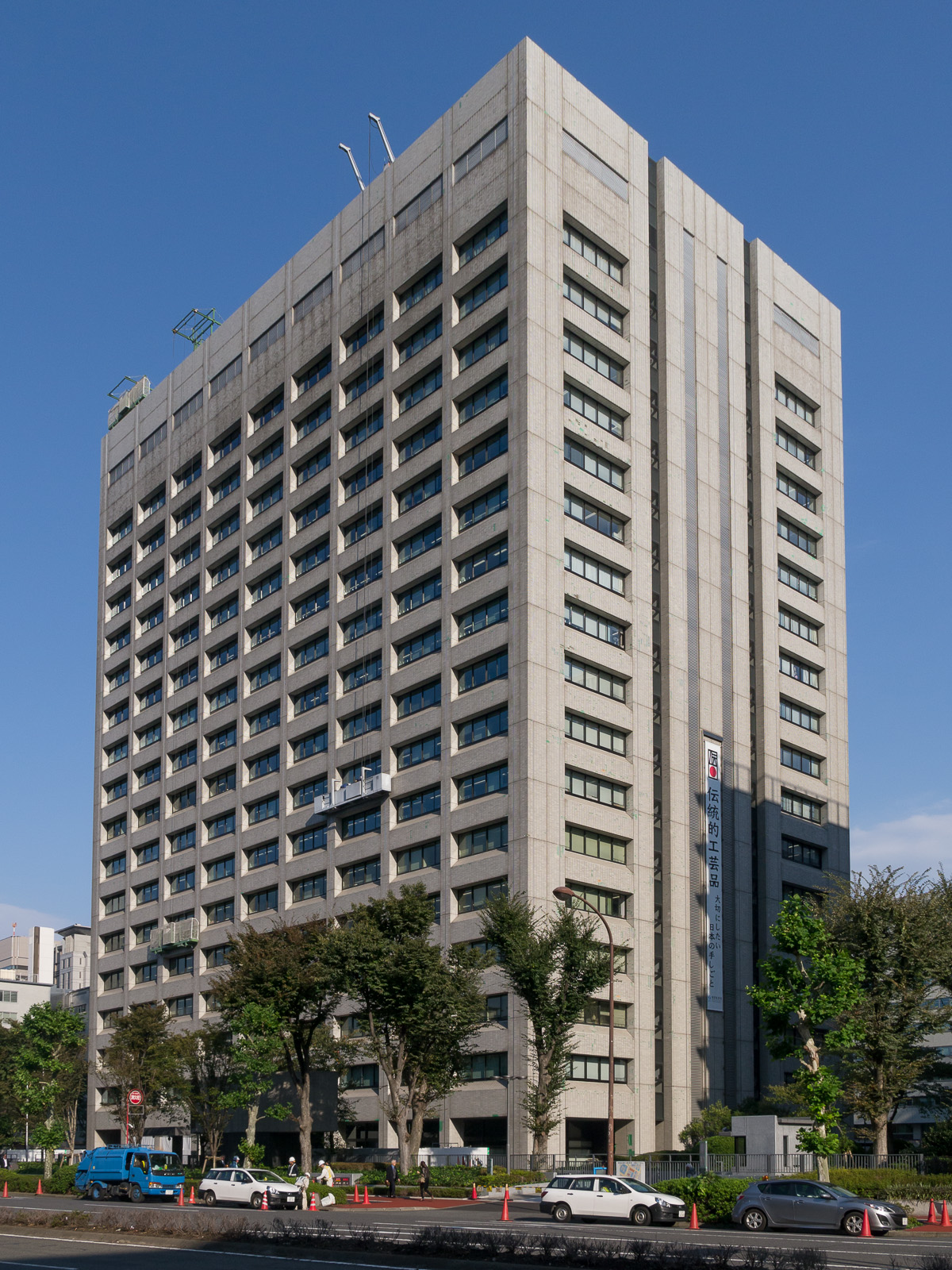
- Headquarters

Agency overview
- Formed: 6 January 2001
- Preceding agencies: Ministry of International Trade and Industry; Economic Planning Agency
- Jurisdiction: Government of Japan
- Headquarters: 1-3-1 Kasumigaseki, Chiyoda-ku, Tokyo 100-8901, Japan; 35.672°N 139.751°E
- Minister responsible: Ryosei Akazawa
- Child agencies: Agency for Natural Resources and Energy; Japan Patent Office; Small and Medium Enterprise Agency; Electricity and Gas Market Surveillance Commission
- Website: meti.go.jp/english

The Ministry of Economy, Trade and Industry (経済産業省, Keizai-sangyō-shō; lit. 'Ministry of Economy and Industry'; METI) is a ministry of the Government of Japan. It was created by the 2001 Central Government Reform when the Ministry of International Trade and Industry (MITI) merged with agencies from other ministries related to economic activities, such as the Economic Planning Agency.

METI has jurisdiction over a broad policy area, containing Japan's industrial/trade policies, energy security, control of arms exports, "Cool Japan", etc.

The Ministry has its headquarters in Kasumigaseki, Chiyoda Ward, Tokyo. Its current head is Ryosei Akazawa, who was appointed minister by Prime Minister Sanae Takaichi in October 2025.

== Overview ==
The mission stipulated in Article 3 of the Act for the Establishment of the Ministry of Economy, Trade and Industry (Act No. 99 of 1999) is to "enhance the economic vitality of the private sector and develop economic and industrial development centered on the smooth development of foreign economic relations, as well as the stable and efficient development of mineral and energy resources." In order to achieve the goal of ensuring supply, it has jurisdiction over macroeconomic policies, industrial policies, trade policies, trade control operations, industrial technology policies, distribution policies, and energy policies.

Some middle-ranking bureaucrats selected from the Ministry of Economy, Trade and Industry are based in the Japan External Trade Organization in foreign countries and are engaged in various research work as industrial investigators.

Since many of the industrial policies initiated by METI, such as the nuclear fuel cycle program and the 5th generation computer program and software development program ("Sigma Plan"), have failed, the ministry is not highly regarded or trusted in Japan in the 21st century.

== History ==
The Ministry's predecessor, the Ministry of International Trade and Industry, was in operation from 25 May 1949 to 5 January 2001. However, due to the reorganisation of central government ministries and agencies on 6 January 2001, the Ministry of Economy, Trade and Industry was established by reorganising and renaming the Ministry of International Trade and Industry.

In the past, the Ministry of International Trade and Industry was regarded as the driving force behind high economic growth as the "Economic General Staff Headquarters", the general control centre of the Japanese economy or Japan Inc.

It made full use of the licences and administrative guidance that it possessed, and was mainly in charge of industrial policy, using allocated loans (FILP) from government-affiliated financial institutions, budget allowances, and subsidies as sources of power. In addition, it held a wide range of authority in areas such as science and technology research and development, trade, patents, energy policy, and small and medium enterprise policy according to technological innovation. It was also involved in monetary policy.

However, after Japan's period of high economic growth ended, one-off policy ideas were inevitably created because, despite having a wide range of authority, they were unable to administer licensing and subsidies compared to other ministries and agencies such as "operational government agencies", it became the main one. Ad balloons for various new policies are launched around May and June every year. For this reason, while the Ministry of Finance is still a "general government agency" that is widely involved in decision-making through fiscal policy, budget assessments, and taxation, the Ministry of Economy, Trade and Industry is an "administrative department store" that has jurisdiction over most industries. It is described as a "limited general government office".

== Structure ==
METI is organized into the following bureaus, offices, departments and 3 agencies (Agency for Natural Resources and Energy, Small and Medium Enterprise Agency, Japan Patent Office):

- Economic and Industrial Policy Bureau
  - General Affairs Division
  - Research Division
  - Industrial Human Resources Division
  - Industrial Organization Division
  - Regional Economic and Industrial Policy Division
  - Regional Industrial Infrastructure Development Division
  - Industrial Finance Division
  - Corporate Behavior Division
  - Industrial Creation Division
- Trade Policy Bureau
  - General Affairs Division
  - Trade Policy Division
  - Trade and Finance Division
  - Trade Promotion Division
  - Economic Partnership Division
  - Americas Division
  - Europe, Middle East, and Africa Division
  - Asia and Pacific Division
  - Northeast Asia Division
  - International Economic Department
    - counselor
    - Economic Cooperation Division
- Trade and Economic Security Bureau
  - General Affairs Division
  - Trade Control Department
    - Trade Control strategy Division
    - Trade Licensing Division
    - Security Export Control Policy Division
    - Security Export Licensing Division
  - Economic and Security Policy Division
- Innovation and Environment Bureau
  - General Affairs Division
  - Innovation Policy Division
  - Innovation Creation New Business Promotion Division
  - Research and Development Division
  - Technical Regulations, Standards, and Conformity Assessment Policy Division
  - Measurement and Intellectual Infrastructure Division
  - Environmental Policy Division
  - Resource Circulation Economy Division
  - GX Promotion Division
- Manufacturing Industries Bureau
  - General Affairs Division
  - Metal section
  - Minerals Division
  - Material Industry Division
  - Life products section
  - Industrial Machinery Division
  - Aircraft Weapons Industry Division
  - Automotive Division
  - Space Industry Division
- Commerce and Information Policy Bureau
  - General Affairs Division
  - Information Economy Division
    - IT Project Office
    - Information and International Policy Office
  - Cyber Security Division
  - Information and Communication Electronics Division
    - Device Industry Strategy Office
    - Environmental Affairs and Recycling Office
    - Digital Consumer Electronics Strategy Office
  - Information Service Division
  - Battery Industry Division
  - Service Affairs Policy Division
    - Service Industries Office
  - Healthcare Industries Division
    - Medical and Assistive Device Industries Office
  - Creative Industries Division
    - Fashion Policy Office
    - Cool Japan Promotion Office
    - Design Policy Office
    - Consumer Goods Office
    - Traditional Craft Industry Office
  - Media and Content Industry Division
- Agency for Natural Resources and Energy
- Small and Medium Enterprise Agency
- Japan Patent Office
- Minister's Secretariat
- Regional Bureaus & Industrial Safety and Inspection Department
- Incorporated Administrative Agencies

== List of ministers ==
#	Agency Minister	Debut month	Retire month	Prime Minister
1	Takeo Hiranuma	January 2001	September 2003	Jun'ichirō Koizumi
2	Shoichi Nakagawa	September 2003	October 2005	Jun'ichirō Koizumi
3	Toshihiro Nikai	November 2005	September 2006	Jun'ichirō Koizumi
4	Akira Amari	September 2006	August 2008	Shinzō Abe; Yasuo Fukuda
3	Toshihiro Nikai	August 2008	September 2009	Tarō Asō
5	Masayuki Naoshima	September 2009	September 2010	Yukio Hatoyama; Naoto Kan
6	Akihiro Ohata	September 2010	January 2011	Naoto Kan
7	Banri Kaieda	January 2011	September 2011	Naoto Kan
8	Yoshio Hachiro	September 2011	September 2011	Yoshihiko Noda
9	Yukio Edano	September 2011	December 2012	Yoshihiko Noda
10	Toshimitsu Motegi	December 2012	September 2014	Shinzō Abe
11	Yūko Obuchi	September 2014	October 2014	Shinzō Abe
12	Yōichi Miyazawa	October 2014	October 2015	Shinzō Abe
13	Motoo Hayashi	October 2015	August 2016	Shinzō Abe
14	Hiroshige Sekō	August 2016	September 2019	Shinzō Abe
15	Isshu Sugawara	September 2019	October 2019	Shinzō Abe
16	Hiroshi Kajiyama	October 2019	October 2021	Shinzō Abe; Yoshihide Suga
17	Kōichi Hagiuda	October 2021	August 2022	Fumio Kishida
18	Yasutoshi Nishimura	August 2022	December 2023	Fumio Kishida
19	Ken Saitō	December 2022	October 2024	Fumio Kishida
19	Yoji Muto	October 2024		Shigeru Ishiba

== Controversies ==
In July 2019, restrictions were taken on the export of semiconductor components without any consultation with South Korea.
