= GEOS (eikaiwa) =

Coordinates: 35.619773°N 139.729426°E

GEOS 株式会社ジオス
- Type: Kabushiki kaisha
- Industry: Language instruction
- Founded: Tokushima, Japan (1973)
- Headquarters: Shinagawa, Tokyo, Japan
- Key people: Tsuneo Kusunoki (楠 恒男) president and CEO
- Website: www.geos.co.jp (in Japanese) www.geos-network.com (in English)

GEOS (株式会社ジオス, Kabushiki Kaisha Jiosu) was one of the Big Four private eikaiwa, or English conversation teaching companies, in Japan. Its extensive network of overseas schools made it the world's largest language school chain. The firm went into bankruptcy in Japan on April 20, 2010. Its headquarters were in the Shin Osaki Kangyo Building (新大崎勧業ビルディング, Shin Ōsaki Kangyō Birudingu) in Shinagawa, Tokyo.

GEOS, which stands for Global Education Opportunities and Services, was formed in 1973 by Tsuneo Kusunoki. The first school was based in Tokushima City, Tokushima Prefecture, Japan, also the location of one of the company's main registered offices.

The GEOS eikaiwa group also ran children-only schools called "Kodomo Schools" (子供校) throughout Japan. The adult GEOS eikaiwa schools had themselves taken on more classes for children. As of February 2007, GEOS had a total of around 500 "Kodomo" and adult schools in Japan and over 55 schools outside Japan.

The main language the school taught was English. Other languages included French, Spanish, Italian, German, Chinese and Korean. The school also taught Japanese to foreigners living in Japan at their Kudan Japanese Culture, Research Center and Language Institute in Kudanshita, Tokyo. The school used a one-teacher system it calls "Tanninsei" where students keep the same teacher for an extended period of time and advertised this system as having benefits of promoting continuity and strong teacher-student relationship.

The GEOS Eikaiwa Corporation filed for bankruptcy on April 21, 2010; 99 schools were closed and the remaining 230 were sold to G.Communication, which is also the "sponsor" of Nova. On October 1, 2010, the schools were resold to Inayoshi Capital.

The GEOS Eikaiwa Group has subsequently ceased trading. After a successful purchase in 2011 the German-based Sprachcaffe Languages Plus currently operates 11 of the former GEOS eikaiwa schools under the GEOS brand.

== History ==
In 1973, roommates Kiyoshi Aki and Tsuneo Kusunoki founded the company AMVIC, an acronym of the phrase, "AMbition and VICtory". The company would focus on foreign language studies.

Later, AMVIC International split into two divisions. Aki became the head of AMVIC Gaigogakuin (AMVIC外語学院, anbikku gaigogakuin), which provided foreign language training for students. Kusunoki would assume control of the AMVIC Eikaiwa (AMVIC英会話, anbikku eikaiwa), which specialized in English language education for non-native speakers. In 1989, Kusunoki's branch of AMVIC International entered negotiations with Warner Pacific College to assume control of 49% of its physical plant for $6 million, a 30-year lease on the schools facilities and a seat as a regent of the school.

== International ==
International expansion began in Vancouver in 1987, and New York, Brighton (UK) in 1989 and Montreal, San Francisco in 1997, Ottawa and Halifax in 1998 (though the Halifax school later closed in 2001). In 2001, GEOS Eikaiwa created a network of international support offices, starting with GEOS International Korea and followed by offices in Korea, Taiwan, Japan, Thailand, Brazil, Hong Kong, Mexico and the Czech Republic. On July 6, 2007, The Japan Times reported that GEOS Eikaiwa would open a school for 150 students in St. Petersburg, Russia as part of a recent expansion into the Russian market by Japanese companies including Toyota and Nissan. Kusunoki, CEO, said the company had "high growth potential in Russia", and that GEOS Eikaiwa would be "targeting business people, aspiring athletes and artists, including aspirants in figure skating, ballet and music".

== Closure of Australian schools ==
On January 29, 2010, the eight Australian GEOS Eikaiwa branches suspended operations, with the nine companies responsible for the schools forced into voluntary administration. On February 1, 2010, Ernst & Young closed all eight GEOS Eikaiwa schools in Australia permanently, citing insufficient finances to continue carrying out business in Australia. Despite a request to GEOS Eikaiwa Japan for funding, it was not forthcoming, leaving 2300 students without the courses they had paid for and 390 employees without jobs or payouts. In their Report to Creditors of GEOS Melbourne Pty Ltd, dated February 23, 2010, Ernst & Young stated that the school had been operating profitably but "in the 18 months prior to closure, approximately $1.36 million was made available for the purpose of transfer from GEOS Australia Holdings to GEOS Corporation (Japan) or other GEOS entities.

== Bankruptcy ==
On April 21, 2010, GEOS Eikaiwa Corporation filed for bankruptcy with the Tokyo District Court with an outstanding debt of about 7.5 billion yen. 99 schools closed, and 230 schools were handed over to G.Communication, which is also the "sponsor" of Nova.

Around 36,800 students were studying at GEOS Eikaiwa schools at the time of the collapse, around 7,800 of these were studying at schools designated for closure. The GEOS Eikaiwa schools in New Zealand were taken over by previous employees.

== Future of the brand ==
While the company GEOS Eikaiwa now ceases to exist, the 11 GEOS schools currently operating in the United States and Canada were successfully purchased by the German-based language travel operator Sprachcaffe Languages Plus in 2011. These schools are now operated under the 'GEOS Languages Plus' brand but are also marketed under the Sprachcaffe brand in Europe. Sprachcaffe Languages Plus is continuing to expand its operations outside of Europe, however not currently under the GEOS brand.
