= Katsunuma-budōkyō Station =

Railway station in Kōshū, Yamanashi Prefecture, Japan

CO36 Katsunuma-budōkyō Station 勝沼ぶどう郷駅
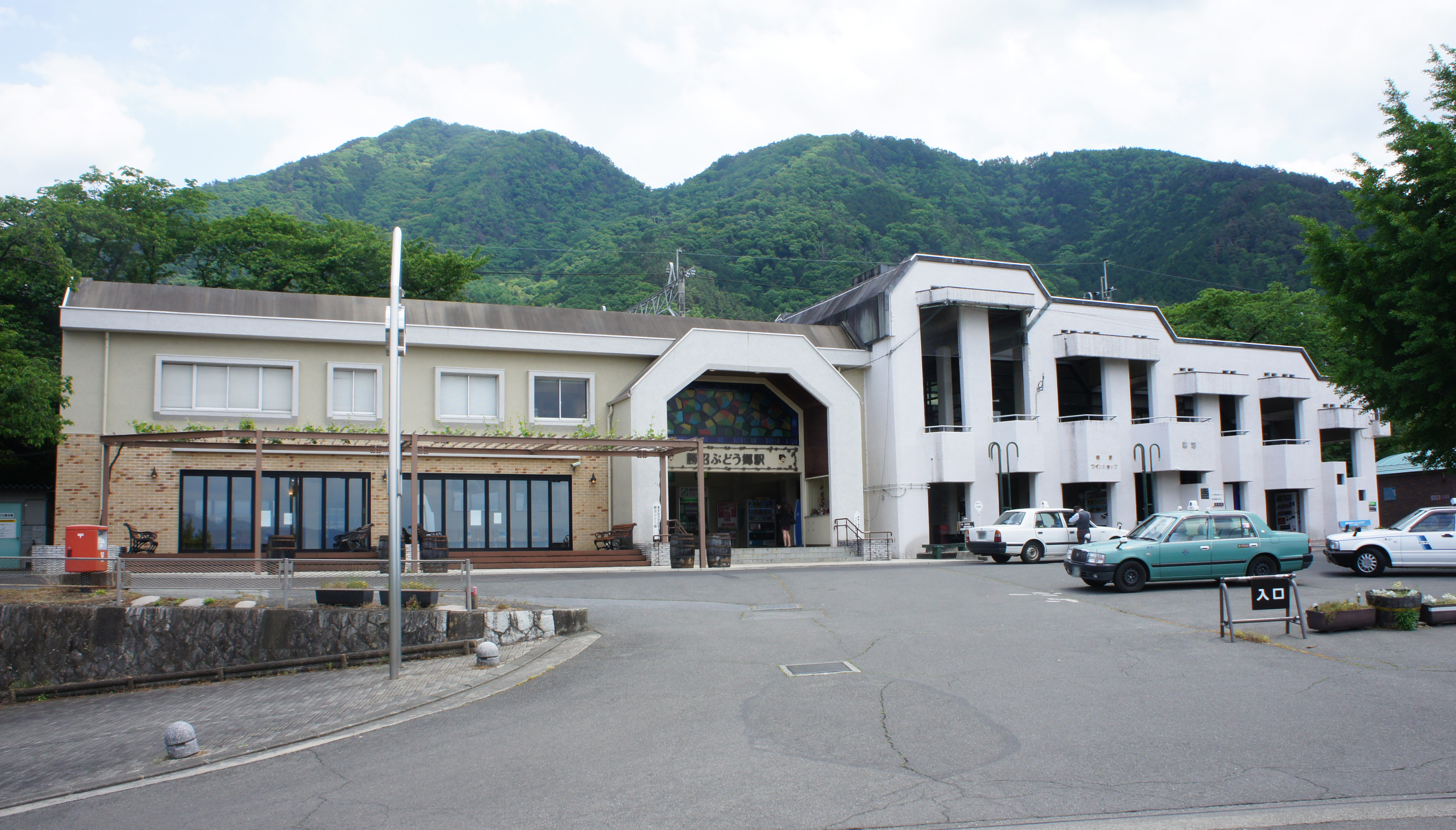
- Katsunuma-budōkyō Station in May 2021

General information
- Location: 3052, Katsunuma-chō Hishiyama, Kōshū-shi, Yamanashi-ken; Japan
- Coordinates: 35°40′21″N 138°44′35″E
- Operator: JR East
- Line: ■ Chūō Main Line
- Distance: 112.5 km from Tokyo
- Platforms: 1 island platform
- Tracks: 2

Other information
- Status: Staffed
- Website: Official website

History
- Opened: April 8, 1913
- Former names: Katsunuma (until 1993)

Passengers
- FY2017: 450 daily

Services
Preceding station	JR East	Following station
Enzan CO37 towards Shiojiri	Chūō Main Line Local	Kai-Yamato CO35 towards Tachikawa
Location
- Location within Yamanashi Prefecture Location within Japan

Katsunuma-budōkyō Station (勝沼ぶどう郷駅, Katsunuma-budōkyō-eki) is a railway station of the Chūō Main Line, East Japan Railway Company (JR East) in Katsunuma-Hishiyama, in the city of Kōshū, Yamanashi Prefecture, Japan.

== Lines ==
Katsunuma-budōkyō Station is served by the Chūō Main Line, and is 112.5 kilometers from the terminus of the line at Tokyo Station.

== Station layout ==
The station consists of one island platform. The station is staffed.

=== Platforms ===
1	■ Chūō Main Line	for Kōfu, Nirasaki Kobuchizawa and Matsumoto
2, 3	■ Chūō Main Line	for Ōtsuki, Takao, Hachiōji and Tachikawa

== History ==
The station opened as Katsunuma Station (勝沼駅, Katsunuma-eki) on April 8, 1913 on the Japanese Government Railways (JGR) Chūō Main Line. The station had served as Ōhikage Signal Stop (大日影信号所, Ōhikage shingōsho) for one week, from April 1, before it started the passenger and freight services. The JGR became the JNR (Japanese National Railways) after the end of World War II. A new two-story station building was completed in October 1980. With the dissolution and privatization of the JNR on April 1, 1987, the station came under the control of the East Japan Railway Company. The station was named to its present name on April 1, 1993. Automated turnstiles using the Suica IC Card system came into operation from October 16, 2004.

== Passenger statistics ==
In fiscal 2017, the station was used by an average of 450 passengers daily (boarding passengers only).

== Surrounding area ==
- former Enzan city hall

== See also ==
- List of railway stations in Japan
