= Katsunuma Nobutomo =

Katsunuma Nobutomo (勝沼 信友; died August, 1535) was a Japanese samurai of the Sengoku period. The son of Takeda Nobutsuna, he was a high-ranking general who served the Takeda clan of Kai Province. As his landholding was in the Katsunuma region of Kai, he used the shō (姓) of "Katsunuma." According to the record Katsuyama-ki (勝山記), he was killed in action during a battle against the Hojo clan of Sagami. Following his death, the family was succeeded by Nobutomo's son Nobumoto.

His oldest daughter was the military writer and poet Rikei.

In the 2007 NHK drama "Fūrin Kazan," Nobutomo was played by Tsuji Kazunaga.
