= Kyōzuka Kofun =

Kofun period burial mound in Yamanashi, Japan

- 経塚古墳 (Japanese)
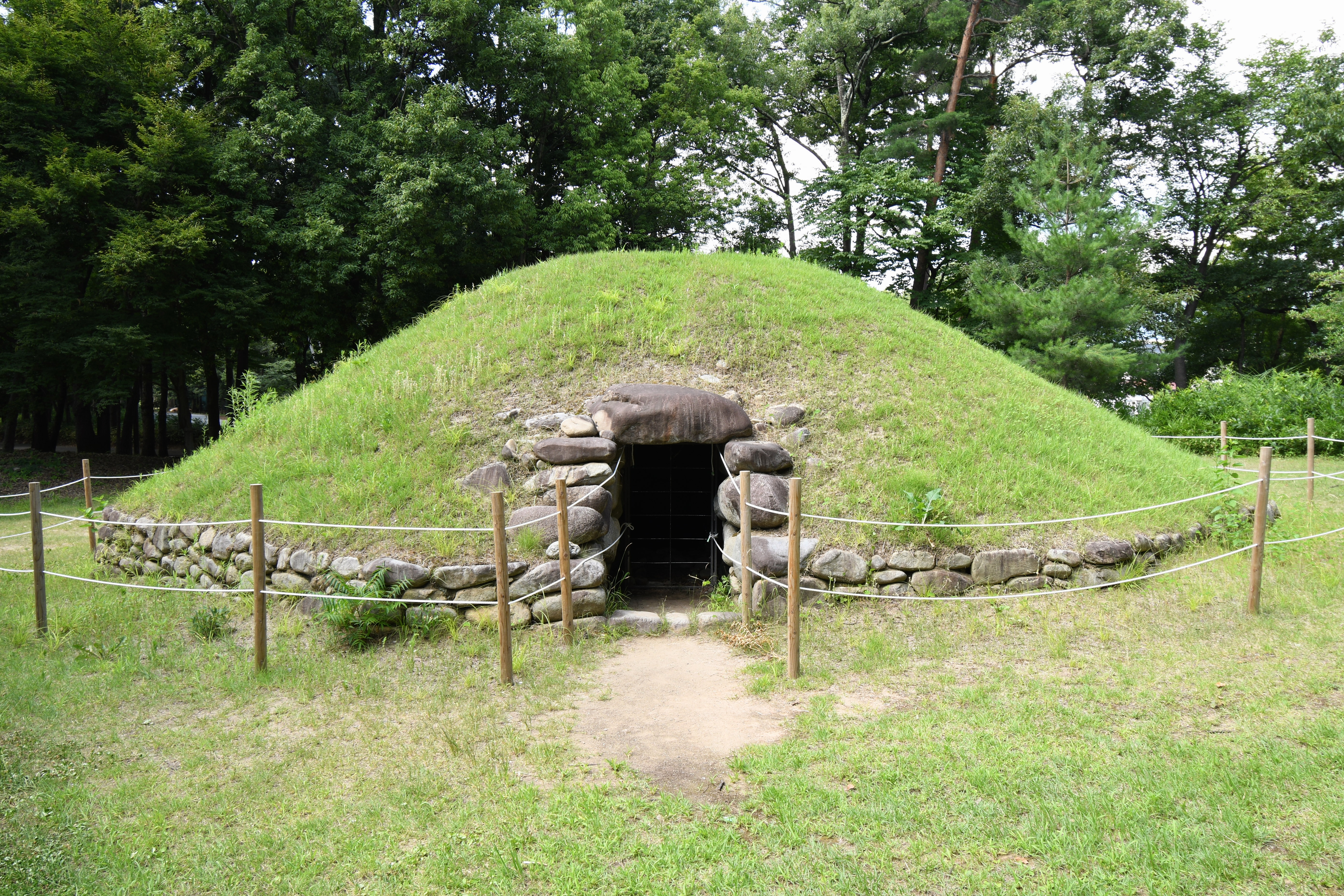
- Kyōzuka Kofun

- Kyōzuka Kofun Kyōzuka Kofun (Japan)
- 35°38′20.2″N 138°40′38.9″E
- Type: Kofun
- Periods: Kofun period
- Location: 1133 Kyozuka, Kokubu, Ichinomiya-cho, Fuefuki, Yamanashi, Japan
- Region: Tōkai region

History
- Built: early 7th century

Site notes
- Public access: Yes (no facilities)
- Yamanashi Prefecture Historic Site

Kyōzuka Kofun (経塚古墳) is a late Kofun period (early 7th century) burial mound, located in the Ichinomiya-cho Kokubu neighborhood of Fuefuki, Yamanashi in the Tōkai region of Japan. The tumulus was designated a Yamanashi Prefecture Historic Site in 1994.

== Overview ==
The Kyōzuka Kofun is located on the Kanagawa alluvial fan, a tributary of the Fuefuki River, in the eastern part of the Kōfu Basin and the western part of the former town of Ichinomiya. It is at an elevation of 348 meters. The surrounding area contains the Kokubu Kofun Group, dating from the late to final Kofun period, and also includes the ruins of the Kai Kokubun-ji and Kai Kokubun-niji from the subsequent Nara period. While the existence of the burial mound was previously known, it was thought to be an enpun (円墳)-style circular tumulus from the 6th or 7th century. However, in archaeological excavations conducted in 1994, it was found to be a very rare octagonal tumulus, the ninth such example nationwide and the third in eastern Japan. The tumulus measures 12.5 meters in diameter and 2.2 meters in height, and has a horizontal-entry stone burial chamber orientated to the due north. Before the excavation, large, sub-rounded pebbles (fukiishi) were exposed in various places on the mound, and the remaining outer stone rows and middle-level stonework were easily discernible.

While the burial chamber retained its original form, one ceiling stone had collapsed. The burial chamber was completely dismantled during the excavation and subsequently restored. Few grave goods were unearthed; besides an iron axe from the construction period, only secondary Kai-type pottery shards and some human remains were found. Based on its similarities to other late-Kofun period tumuli in the vicinity, the structure of the burial chamber, and the iron axe, its construction date is estimated to be the first half of the 7th century, the end of the Kofun period. The artifacts are currently stored at the Yamanashi Prefectural Buried Cultural Properties Center, and the tumulus has been developed into the Yamanashi Prefecture Kanagawa Forest Park .

The octagonal shape of the tumulus is closely associated with imperial tombs in the Kinai region; however, with the spread of Buddhism in Japan and Tang dynasty culture from China, the type began appearing in other locations, such as the Inarizuka Kofun (early 7th century) in Tama, Tokyo, the Isezuka Kofun (early 6th century) in Fujioka, Gunma, and the Mitsuya Kofun (early 7th century) in Yoshioka, Gunma, in eastern Japan.

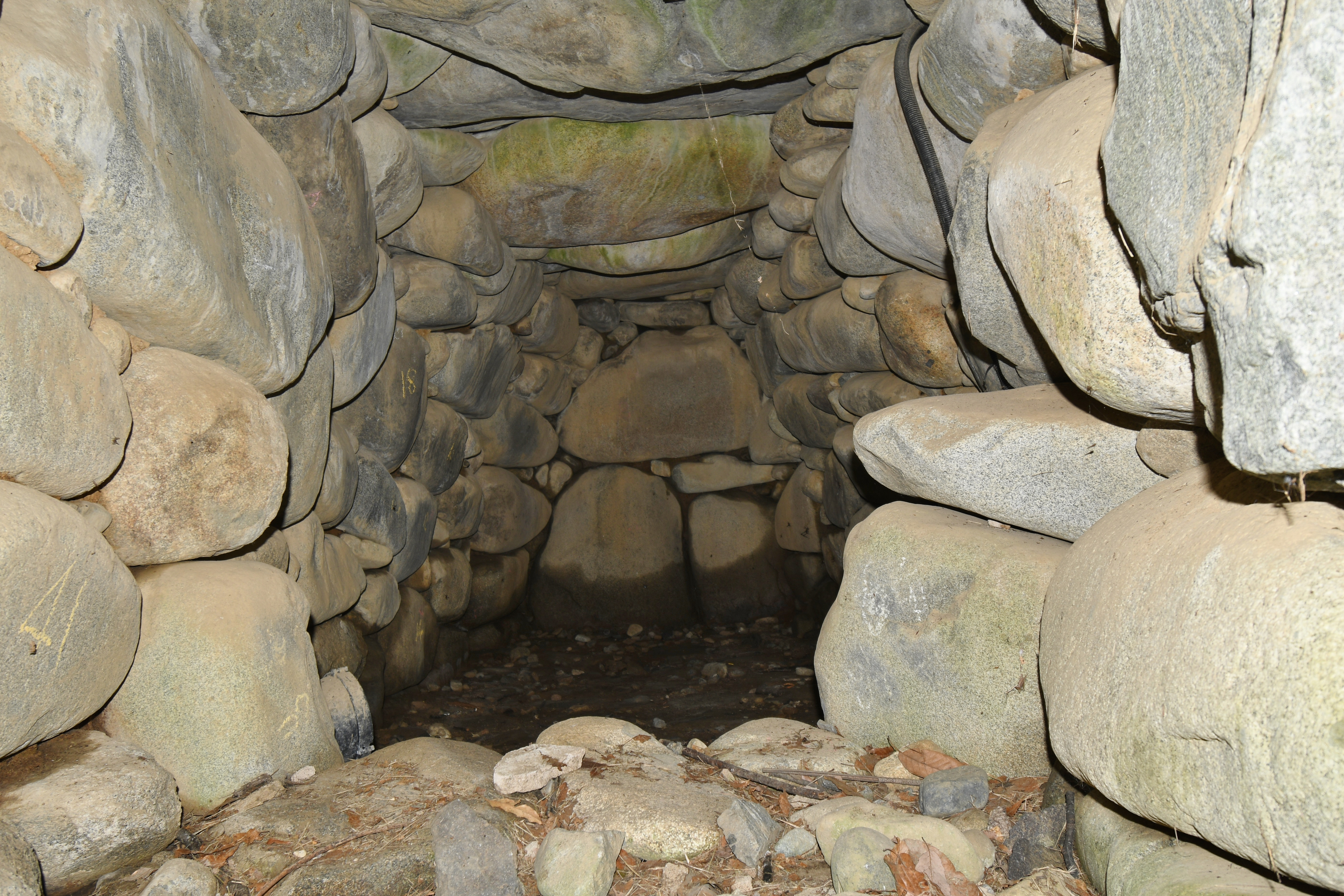
Burial Chamber

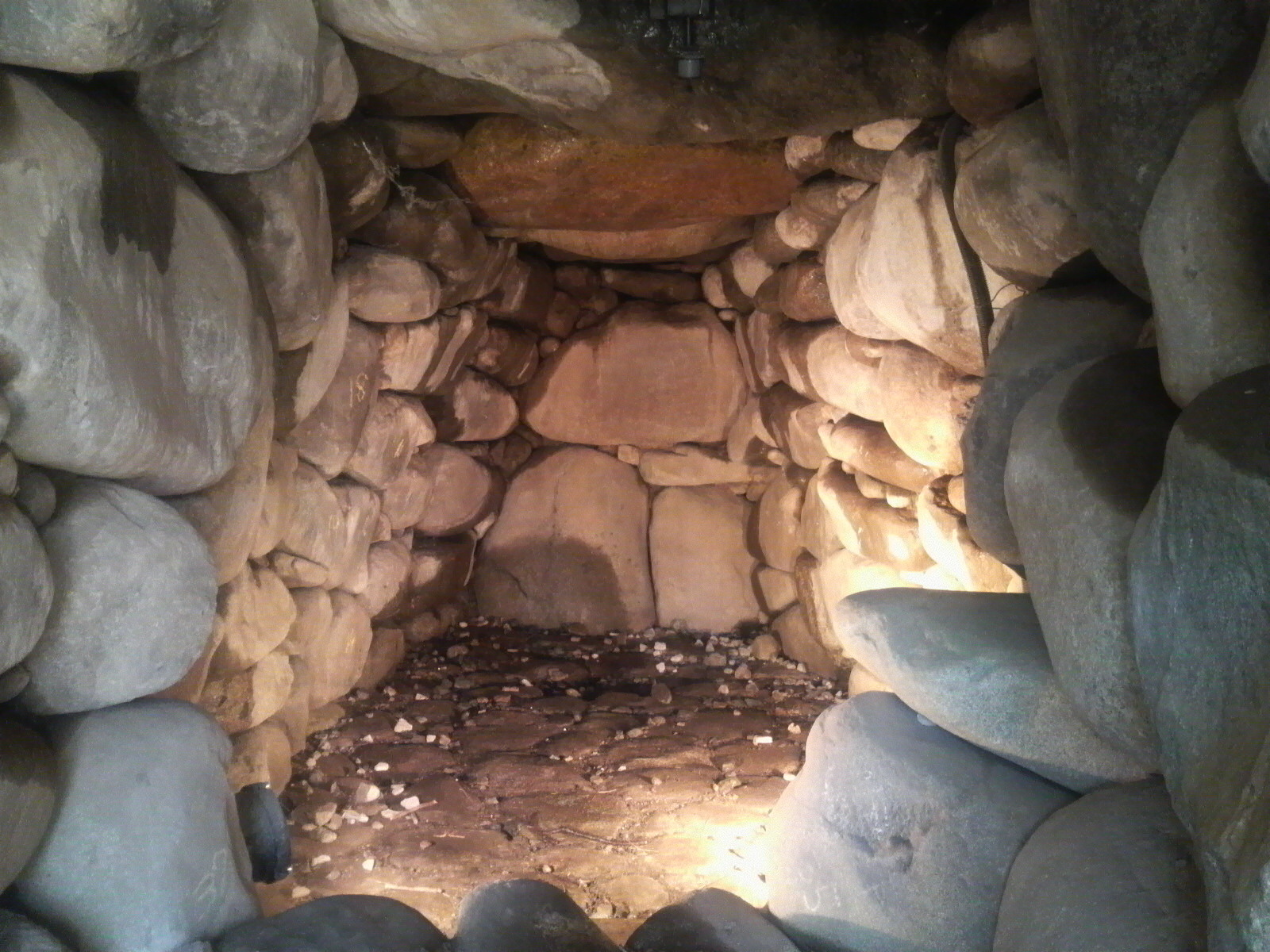
Burial Chamber

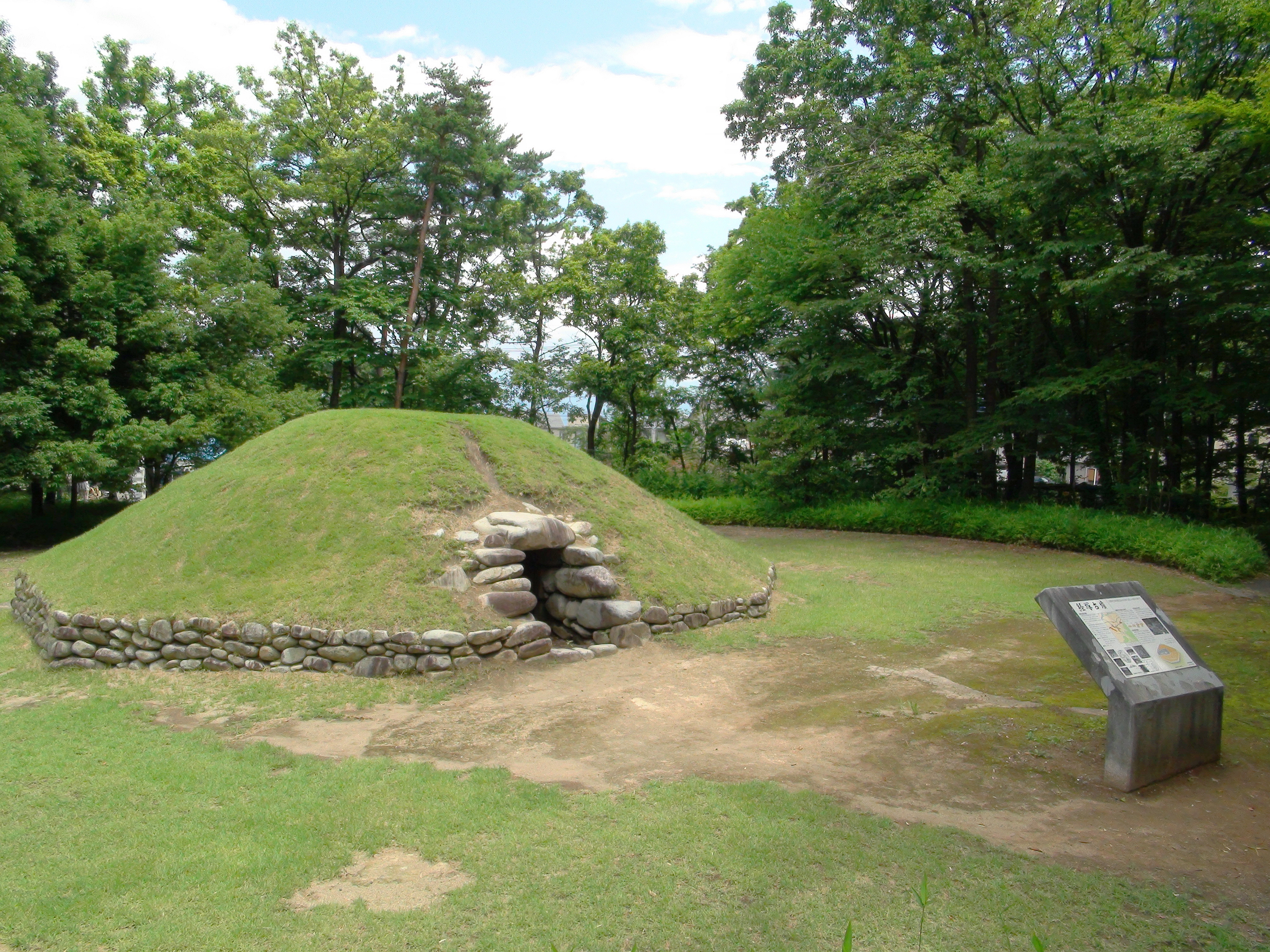
Panoramic view

== See also ==
- List of Historic Sites of Japan (Yamanashi)
