= Miyazuka Kofun =

Kofun period burial mound in Kumagaya, Japan

Miyazuka kofun
- 宮塚古墳 (Japanese)
- Miyazuka kofun

- Miyazuka kofun Miyazuka Kofun (Japan)
- 36°09′06″N 139°20′43″E
- Type: kofun
- Periods: Kofun period
- Location: Kumagaya, Saitama, Japan
- Region: Kantō region

History
- Built: 7th century AD

Site notes
- Public access: Yes (no facilities)

The Miyazuka Kofun (宮塚古墳) is a Kofun period burial mound located in the Hirose neighborhood of what is now the city of Kumagaya, Saitama Prefecture in the Kantō region of Japan. It was designated a National Historic Site of Japan in 1956.

== Overview ==
The Miyazuka Kofun is located on a river terrace in the middle reaches of the Arakawa River, and is part of the Hirose tumulus cluster, which has many densely packed small-scale tumuli. It is a rare example of a Joenkahofun (上円下方墳) tumulus, which has a square base on top of which is a domed tumulus. It was built in the latter half of the 7th century, or towards the final stages of the Kofun period. The mound was originally covered in fukiishi. It has never been excavated, so the structure of the burial chamber or presence of any grave goods is unknown. Although the base was originally square, it has been partially cut away by local farmers.

The site is located about 15 minutes on foot from Hirose-Yachō-no-Mori Station on the Chichibu Railway Chichibu Main Line.

Upper domed portion
10 meter diameter x 2.5 meter high
Lower rectangular base
17 meters wide on east x 24 meters wide on west x 2 meters high

== See also ==
- List of Historic Sites of Japan (Saitama)
