= Musashi Fuchū Kumano Jinja Kofun =

- 武蔵府中熊野神社古墳 (Japanese)
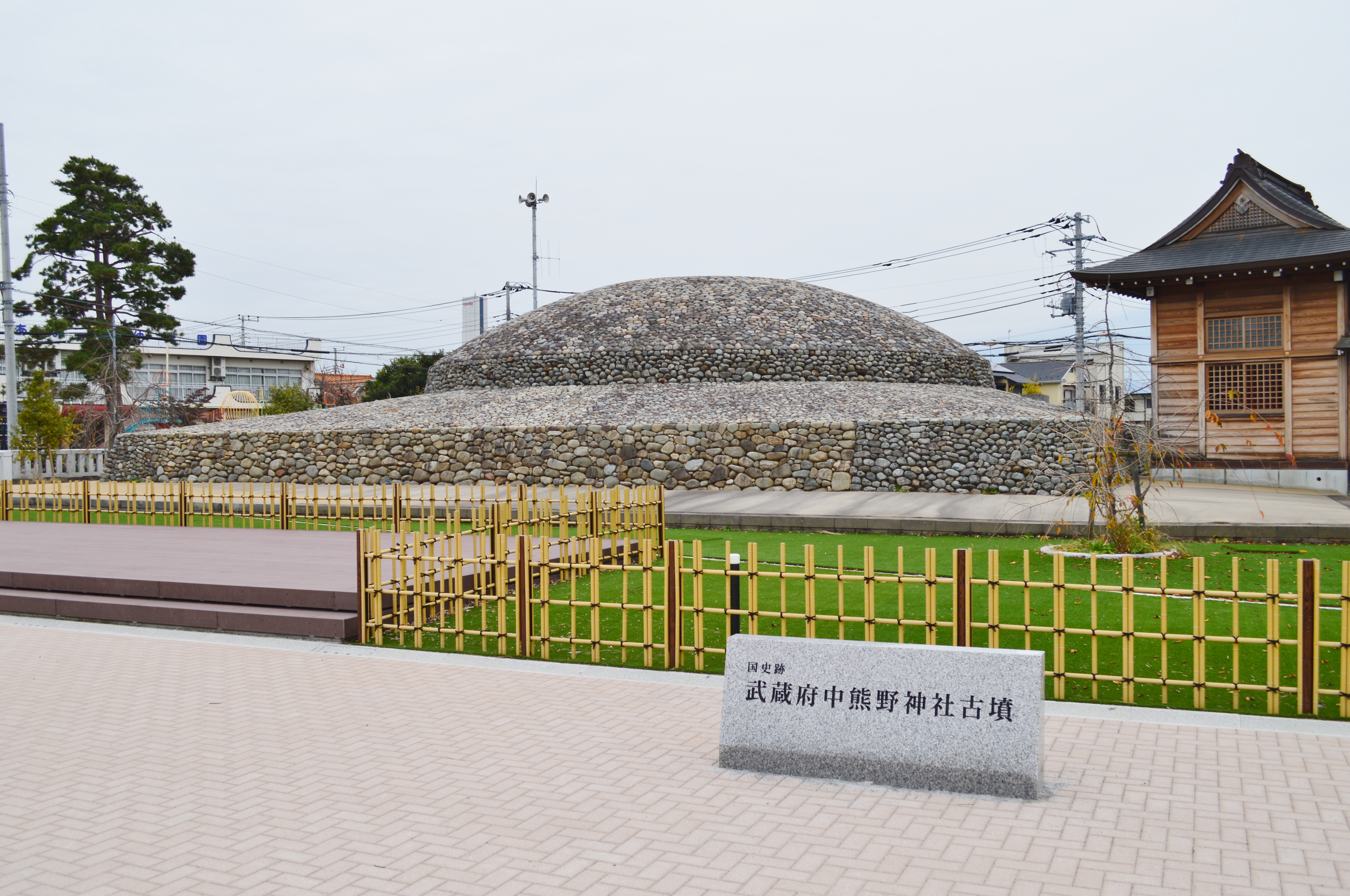
- Musashi Fuchū Kumano Jinja Kofun

- Musashi Fuchū Kumano Jinja Kofun Musashi Fuchū Kumano Jinja Kofun (Japan)
- 35°40′30″N 139°27′26″E
- Type: kofun
- Periods: Kofun period
- Location: Fuchū, Tokyo, Japan
- Region: Kantō region

History
- Built: late 7th century AD

Site notes
- Public access: Yes

The Musashi Fuchū Kumano Jinja Kofun (武蔵府中熊野神社古墳) is a Kofun period burial mound located in the city of Fuchū, Tokyo in the Kantō region of Japan. It received protection as a National Historic Site in 1970.

== Overview ==
The Musashi Fuchu Kumano Jinja Kofun is located on the north side of a Kumano shrine in Fuchū City. The tumulus was believed for centuries to be a natural hill, although there was a local tradition that it contained a cave. The shrine itself was relocated to this site in 1777 and has no connection with the tumulus. In 1990, the shrine decided to remove part of the tumulus to make room for the construction of a new storage shed for its mikoshi floats, and the hill was discovered to be of artificial construction made of rammed earth and river stones. However, as the location is far from any known kofun tumuli clusters, even at this time it was not recognized as being a kofun. In 1994, further investigation using ground penetrating radar indicated the presence of a large stone structure near the top of the mound, raising the possibility that this was indeed a burial tumulus. Shortly afterwards, a local historical journal article dated August 1884 was discovered, stating that a burial chamber had been found within the mound, and that this chamber was divided into three rooms. The innermost room contained two human skeletons, and artifacts resembling "rusty nails". A complete archaeological excavation was conducted from May 2003, in which the hill was confirmed to be a three-tier Joenkahofun (上円下方墳), with two square base tiers and an upper dome. It is the third of this style of tumulus to have been discovered in Japan, and is one of the largest kofun in the Musashi area. The bottom tier is 32 meters long on each side, the middle tier is 23 meters long on each side, and the dome has a diameter of 16 meters and a height of 2.5 meters. The burial chamber had a length of 8.8 meters. Traces of a moat with a width of six meters and depth of two meters have been found on the east and south sides of the tumulus.

As the tomb had been opened in the Meiji period, and possibly earlier, there were few grave goods; however, artifacts recovered included one silver inlaid sheath with metal fittings, six glass beads, three iron swords, and about 300 iron nails. From these artifacts, the tumulus was built from the middle to the latter half of the 7th century AD.

In 2005 it was designated as a National Historic Site. Fuchū city has been active in promoting the site as a tourist attraction, and has restored the mound with fukiishi to what is believed to be its original appearance, and opening an adjacent museum, the Fuchū Kyodo no Mori Museum (府中市郷土の森博物館). It is located about 8 minutes on foot from Nishifu Station on the JR EastNambu Line.

== Gallery ==
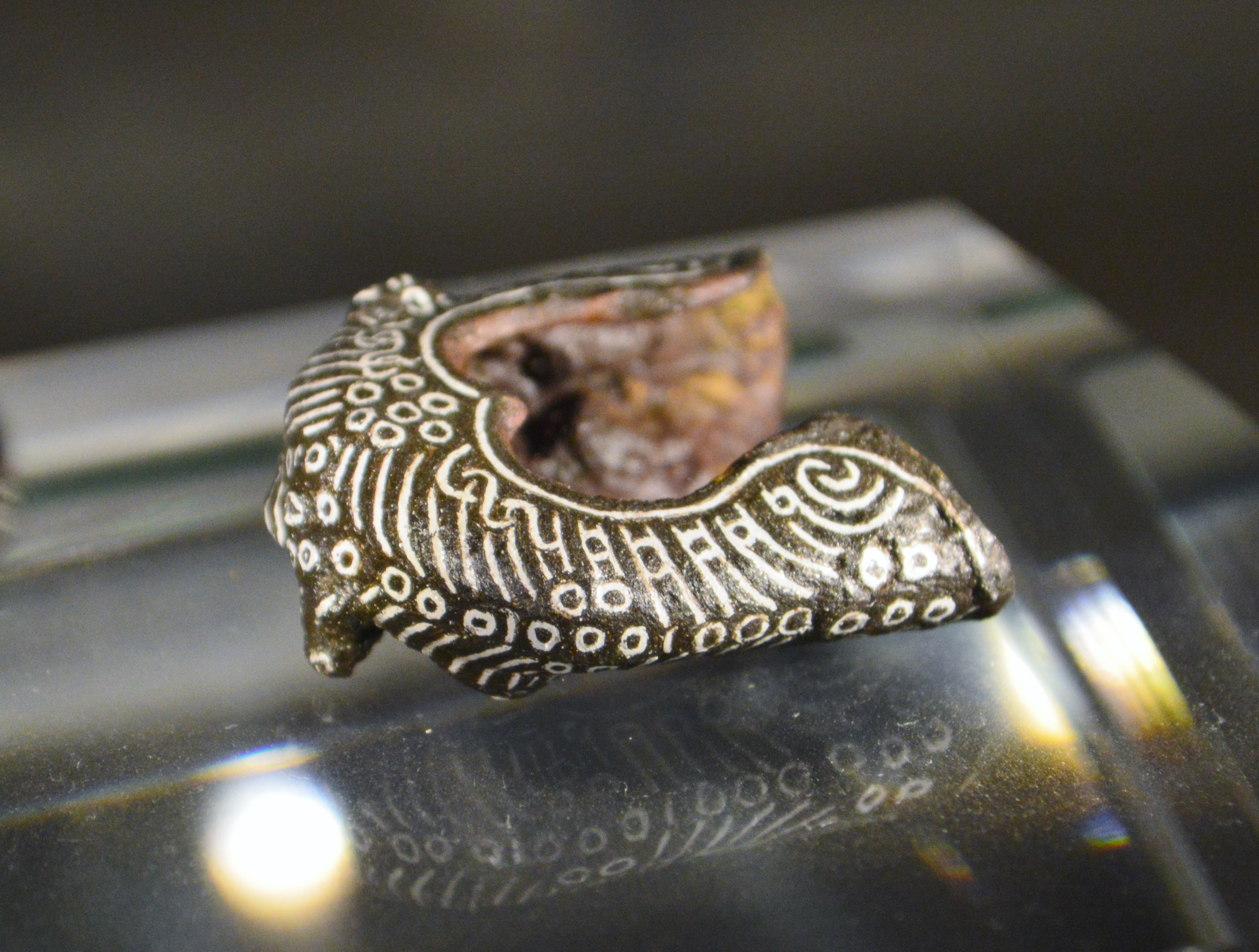
Scabbard metal fittings found within the Musashi Fuchū Kumano Jinja Kofun

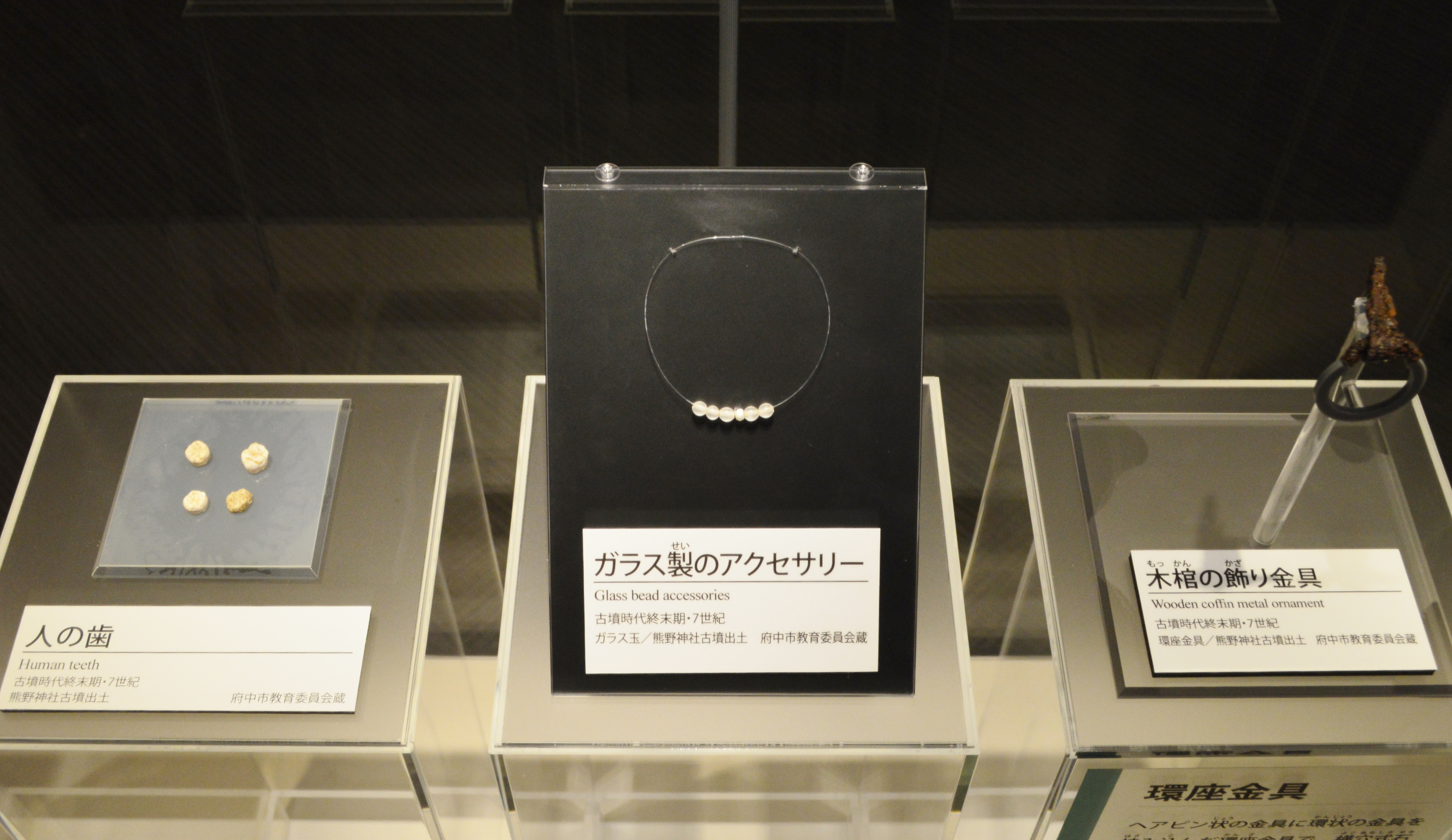
Beads and sword hilt from the Musashi Fuchū Kumano Jinja Kofun

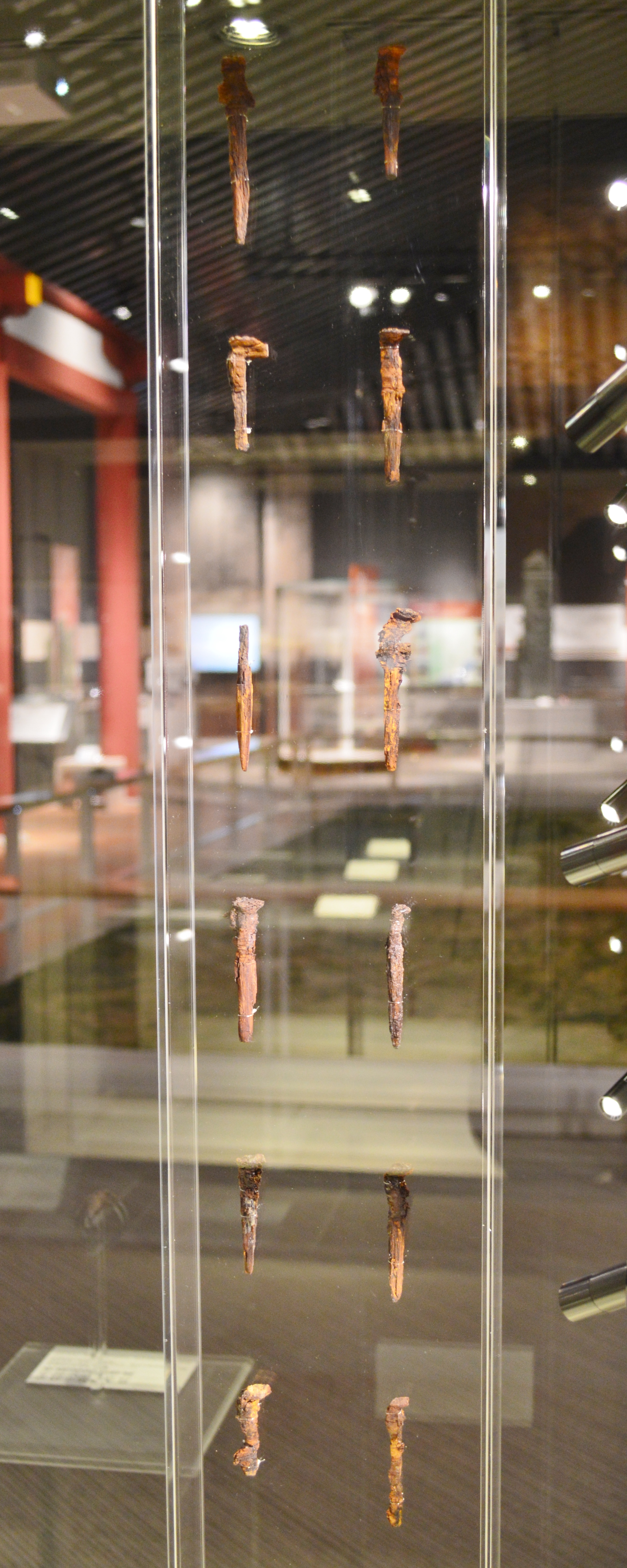
Iron nails from the Musashi Fuchū Kumano Jinja Kofun

== See also ==
- List of Historic Sites of Japan (Tōkyō)
