= Kofun =

Megalithic tombs in Northeast Asia

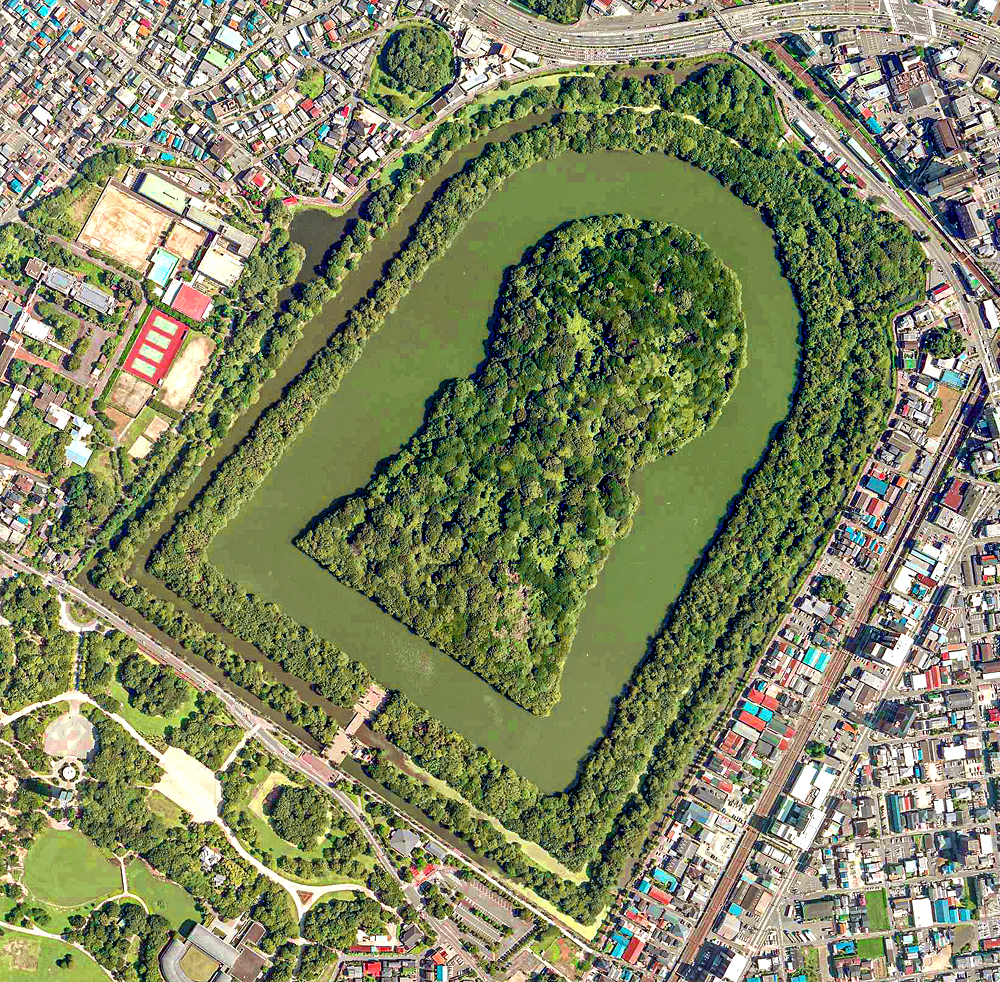
Daisen Kofun, the largest of all kofun, one of many tumuli in the Mozu kofungun, Sakai, Osaka Prefecture (5th century)

Kofun (古墳; from Sino-Japanese "ancient burial mound") are megalithic tombs or tumuli in Northeast Asia. Kofun were mainly constructed in the Japanese archipelago between the middle of the 3rd century to the early 7th century AD.

The term is the origin of the name of the Kofun period, which indicates the middle 3rd century to early–middle 6th century. Many kofun have distinctive keyhole-shaped mounds (zempō-kōen fun (前方後円墳)). The Mozu-Furuichi kofungun or tumulus clusters were inscribed on the UNESCO World Heritage List in 2019, while Ishibutai Kofun is one of a number in Asuka-Fujiwara residing on the Tentative List.

== Overview ==
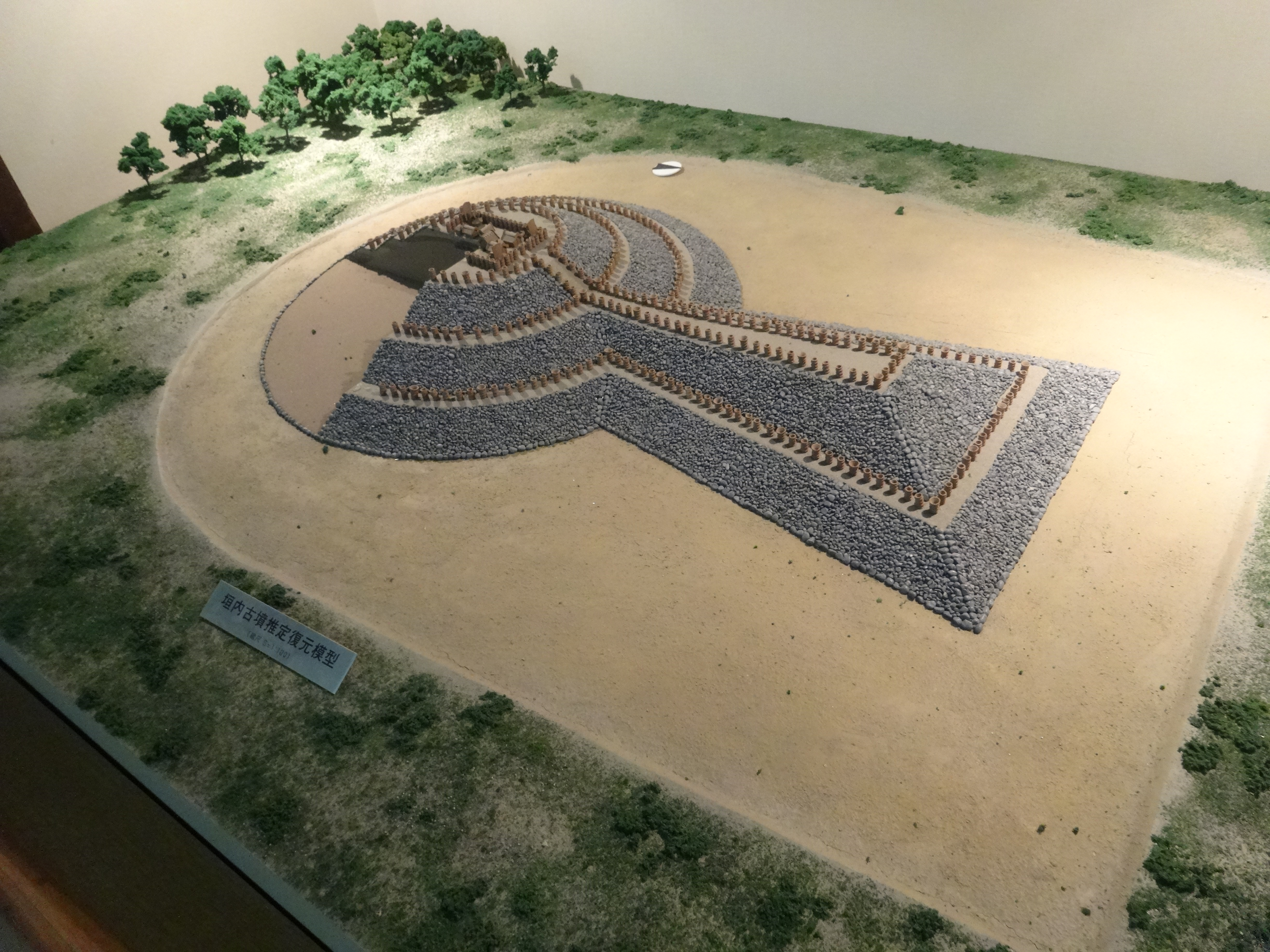
Reconstructed model of a late 4th century zenpō-kōen-fun (Kaichi Kofun), Nantan, Kyoto Prefecture

The kofun tumuli have assumed various shapes throughout history. The most common type of kofun is known as a zenpō-kōen-fun (前方後円墳), which is shaped like a keyhole, having one square end and one circular end, when viewed from above. There are also circular-type (empun (円墳)), "two conjoined rectangles" typed (zenpō-kōhō-fun (前方後方墳)), and square-type (hōfun (方墳)) kofun. Orientation of kofun is not specified. For example, in the Mozu kofun group, in Sakai, several of the circular parts are facing north, while others face east. However, there is no such formation in the Yanagimoto kofun group. Haniwa, terracotta figures, were arrayed above and in the surroundings to delimit and protect the sacred areas.

Kofun range from several metres to over 400 m long. The largest, which has been attributed to Emperor Nintoku, is Daisen Kofun in Sakai City, Osaka Prefecture.

The funeral chamber was located beneath the round part and comprised a group of megaliths. In 1972, the unlooted Takamatsuzuka Tomb was found in Asuka, and some details of the discovery were revealed. Inside the tightly assembled rocks, white lime plasters were pasted, and colored pictures depict the 'Asuka Beauties' of the court as well as constellations. A stone coffin was placed in the chamber, and accessories, swords, and bronze mirrors were laid both inside and outside the coffin. The wall paintings have been designated national treasures and the grave goods as important cultural property, while the tumulus is a special historic site.

=== Locations and number ===
Distribution of Zenpokoenfun

Kofun burial mounds and their remains have been found all over Japan, including remote islands such as Nishinoshima.

A total of 161,560 kofun tomb sites have been found as of 2001. Hyōgo Prefecture has the most of all prefectures (16,577 sites), and Chiba Prefecture has the second most (13,112 sites).

== History ==
=== Yayoi period ===
Distribution of tombs in the Late Yayoi Period

Most of the tombs of chiefs in the Yayoi period were square-shaped mounds surrounded by ditches. The most notable example in the late Yayoi period is Tatetsuki Mound Tomb in Kurashiki, Okayama. The mound is about 45 metres wide and 5 metres high and has a shaft chamber. Broken pieces of Tokushu-kidai, cylindrical earthenware, were excavated around the mound.

Another prevalent type of Yayoi period tomb is the Yosumi tosshutsugata funkyūbo, a square mound with protruding corners. These tombs were built in the San'in region, a coastal area off the Sea of Japan. Unearthed articles indicate the existence of alliances between native tribes in the region.

=== Early Kofun period ===
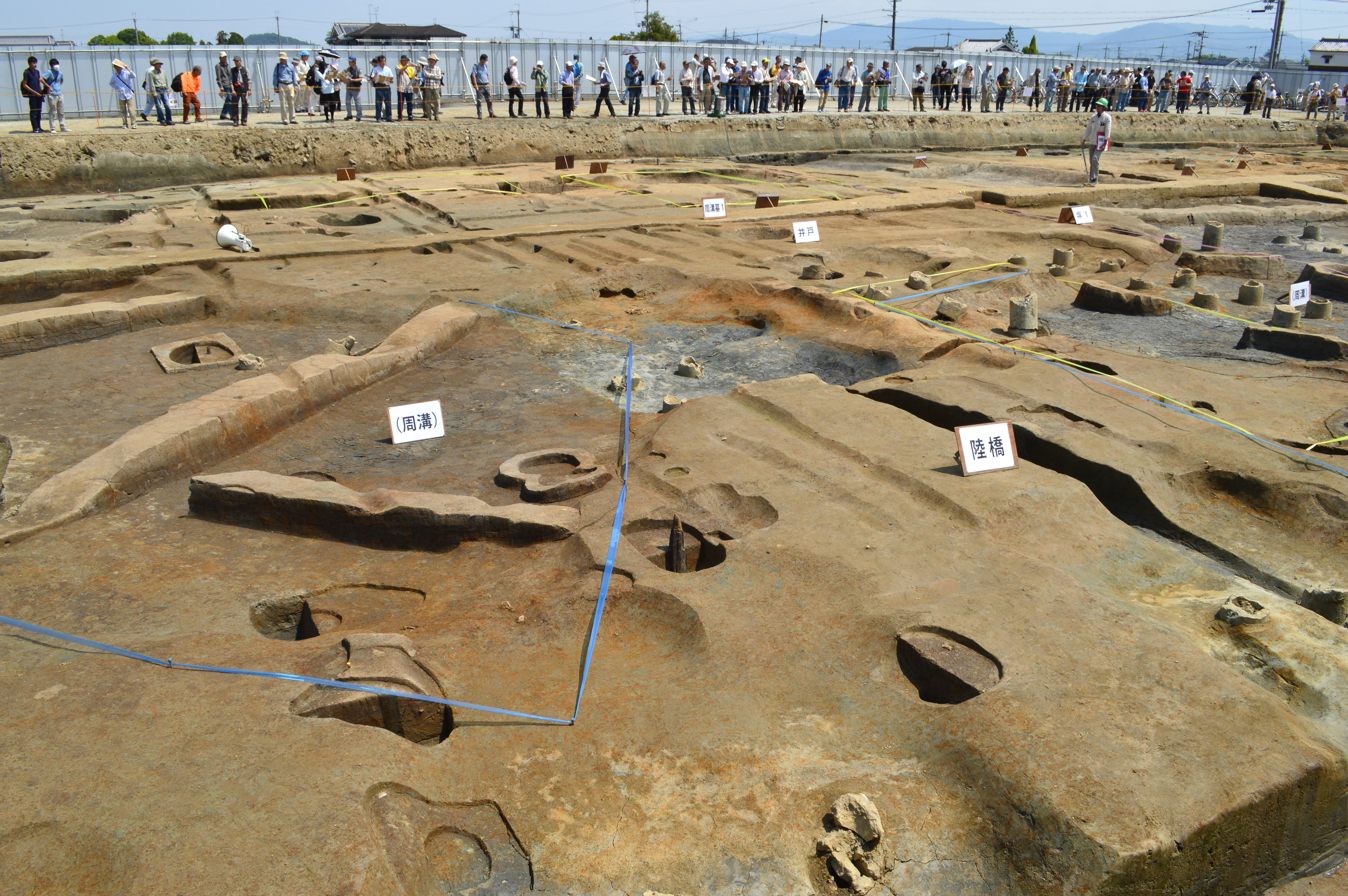
Circular groove tomb at Seta Ruins (Kashihara City, Nara Prefecture)

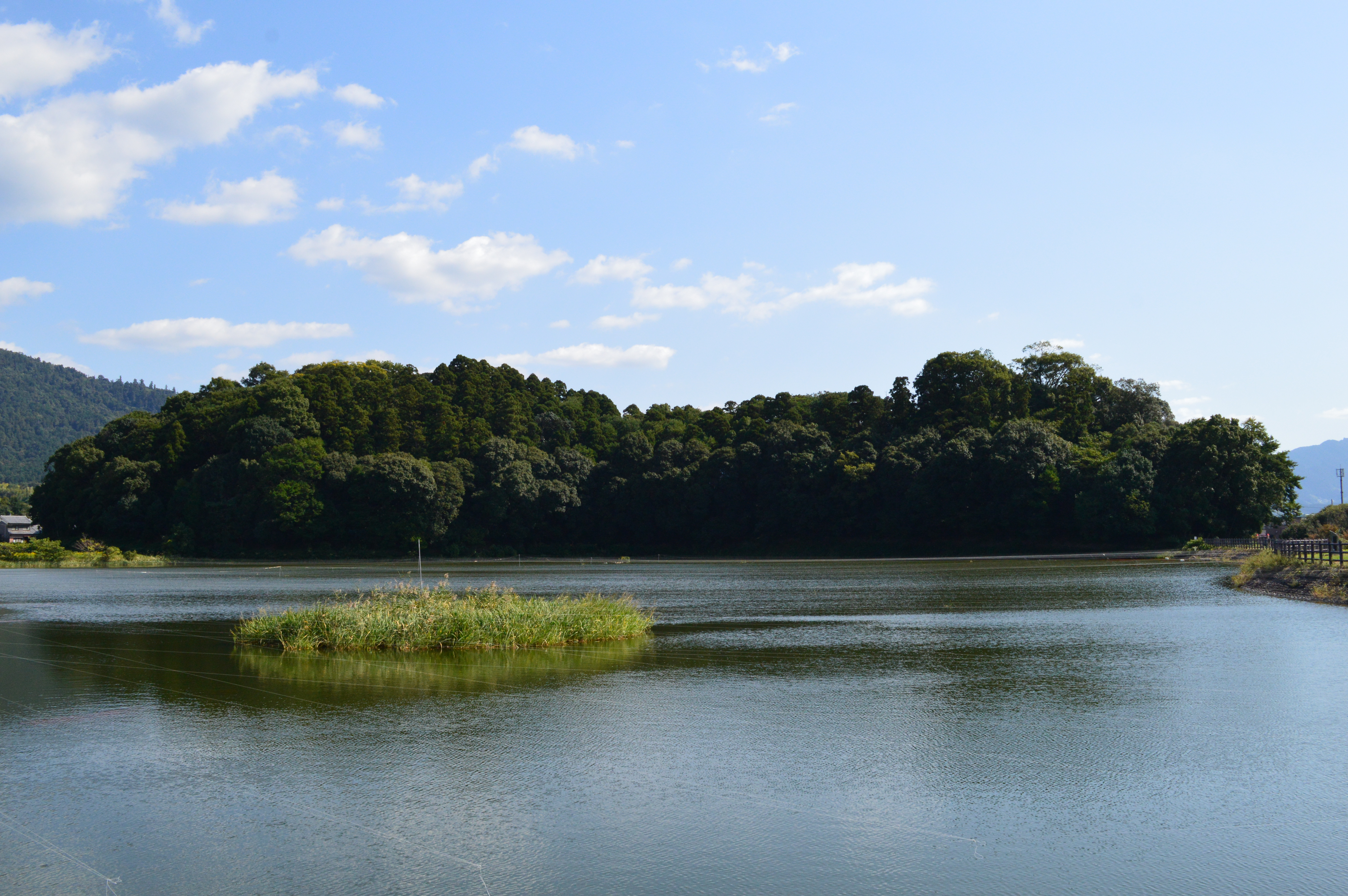
Panoramic view of Hashinaka Kofun in Sakurai, Nara

One of the first keyhole-shaped kofun was built in the Makimuku area, the southeastern part of the Nara Basin. Hashihaka Kofun, which was built in the middle of the 3rd century AD, is 280 metres long and 30 metres high. Its scale is obviously different from previous Yayoi tombs. During the next three decades, about 10 kofun were built in the area. They are now known as the Makimuku Kofun Group. A wooden coffin was placed on the bottom of a shaft, and the surrounding walls were built up by flat stones. Finally, megalithic stones formed the roof. Bronze mirrors, iron swords, magatama, clay vessels and other artifacts were found in good condition in undisturbed tombs. Some scholars assume that the person buried in the Hashihaka kofun was the shadowy ancient Queen Himiko of Yamataikoku, mentioned in Chinese historical texts. According to these texts, Japan was called Wa, and was a confederation of numerous small tribes or countries. The construction of gigantic kofun was the result of the relatively centralized governmental structure in the Nara Basin, possibly the origin of the Yamato polity and the Imperial lineage of Japan.

=== Mid-Kofun period ===
During the 5th century AD, the construction of keyhole kofun began in Yamato Province; continued in Kawachi, where gigantic kofun, such as Daisen Kofun of the Emperor Nintoku, were built; and then throughout the country. The proliferation of keyhole kofun is generally assumed to be evidence of the Yamato court's expansion in this age. However, some argue that it simply shows the spread of culture based on progress in distribution, and has little to do with a political breakthrough.

A few tombs from the mid-Baekje era were excavated around the Yeongsan River basin in South Korea. The design of these tombs are notably different. The tombs that were discovered on the Korean peninsula were built between the 5th and 6th centuries CE. There remain questions about who were buried in these tombs such as nobility, aristocracy, warriors or mercenaries.

Gallery

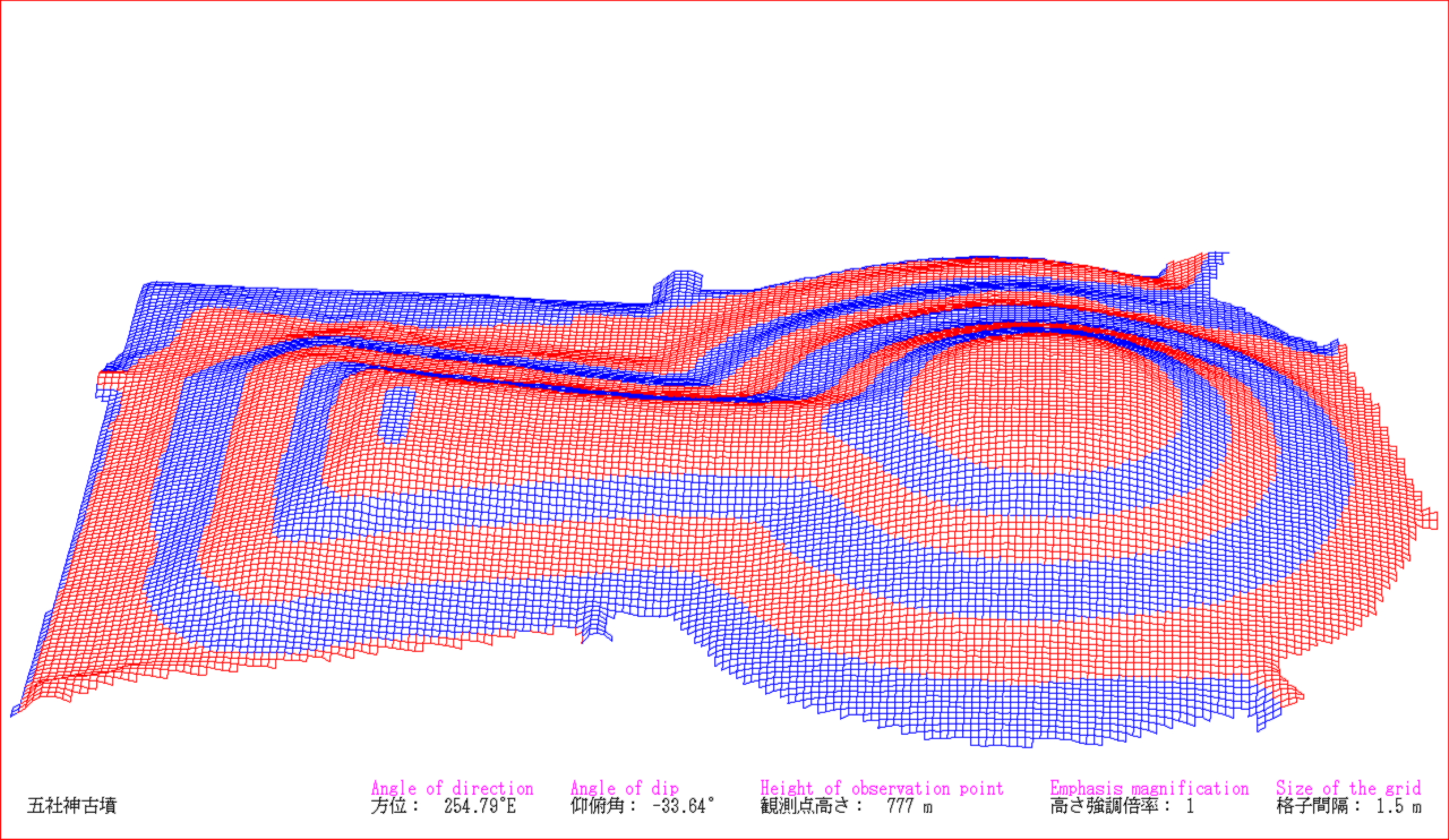
An example of keyhole-shaped mound in the Early Kofun period which was drawn in 3DCG.
(Gosashi Kofun (Nara, Nara), 4th century)

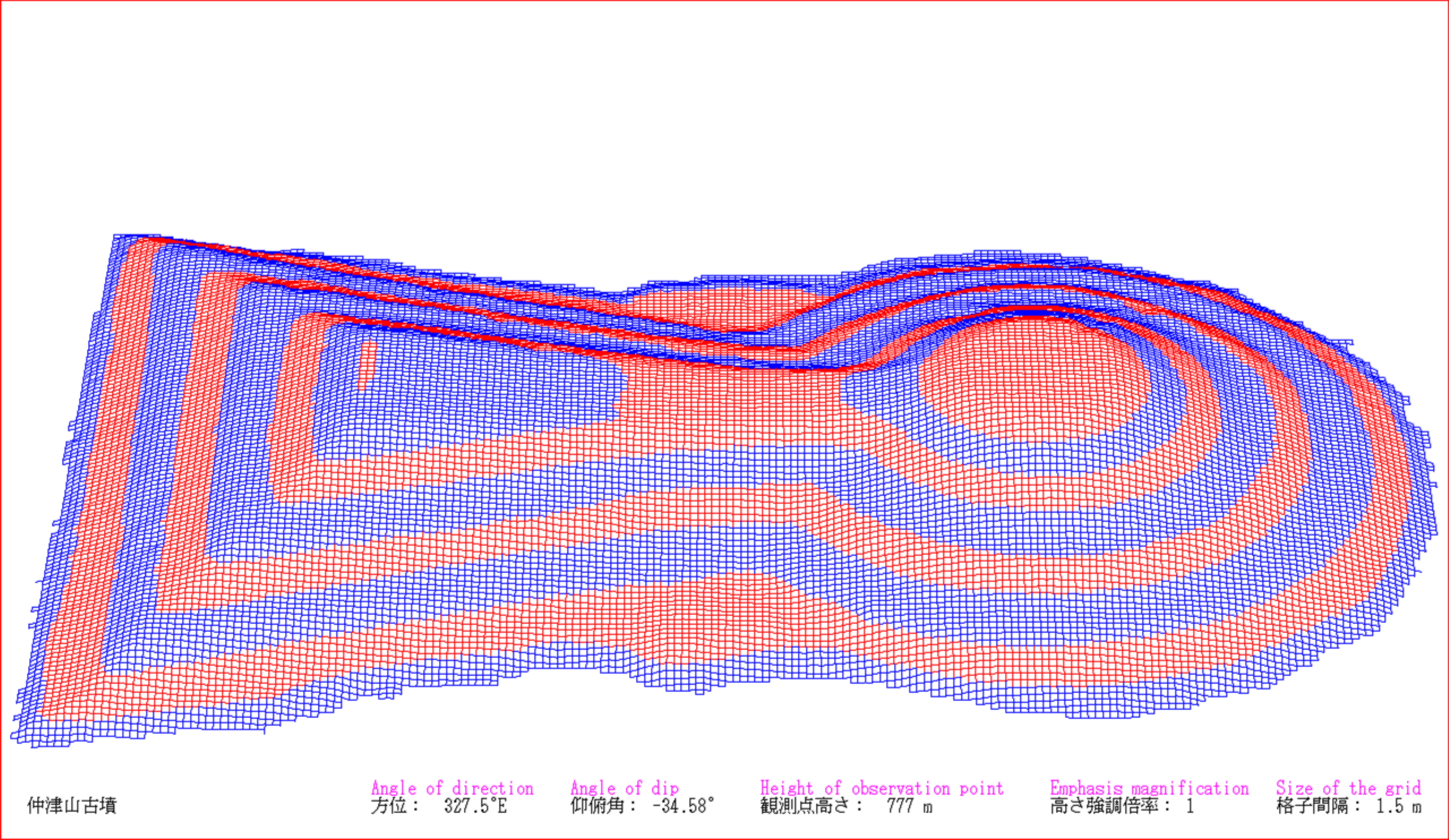
An example of keyhole-shaped mound in the Mid-Kofun period which was drawn in 3DCG.
(Nakatsuyama Kofun (Fujiidera, Osaka), 5th century)

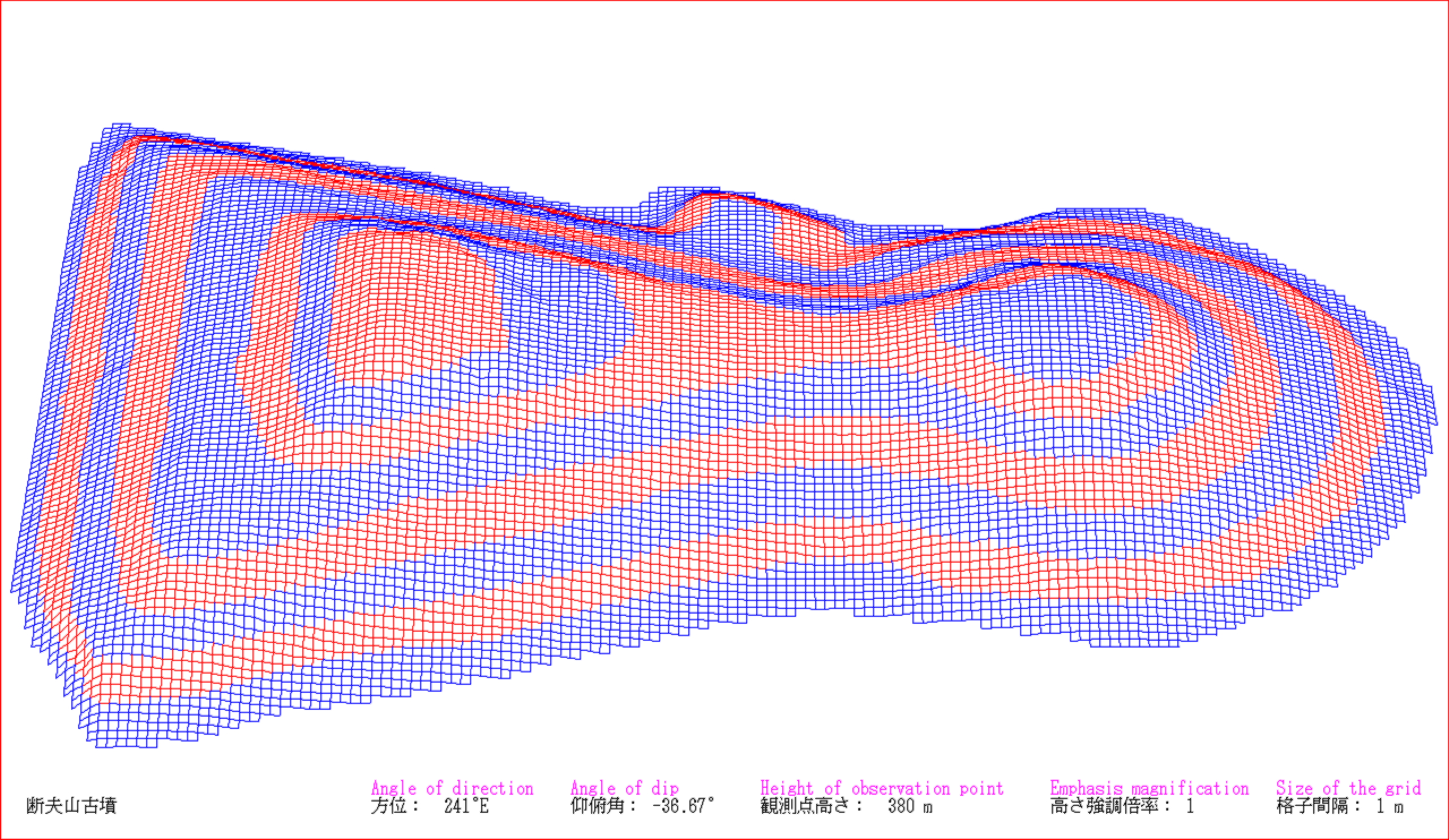
An example of keyhole-shaped mound in the Late Kofun period which was drawn in 3DCG
(Danpusan Kofun (Nagoya), 6th century)

=== Late Kofun period ===
Keyhole-shaped kofun disappeared in the late 6th century AD, probably due to the drastic reformation in the Yamato court. Nihon Shoki records the introduction of Buddhism during this era, which led to cremation becoming the primary funerary means of the nobility.

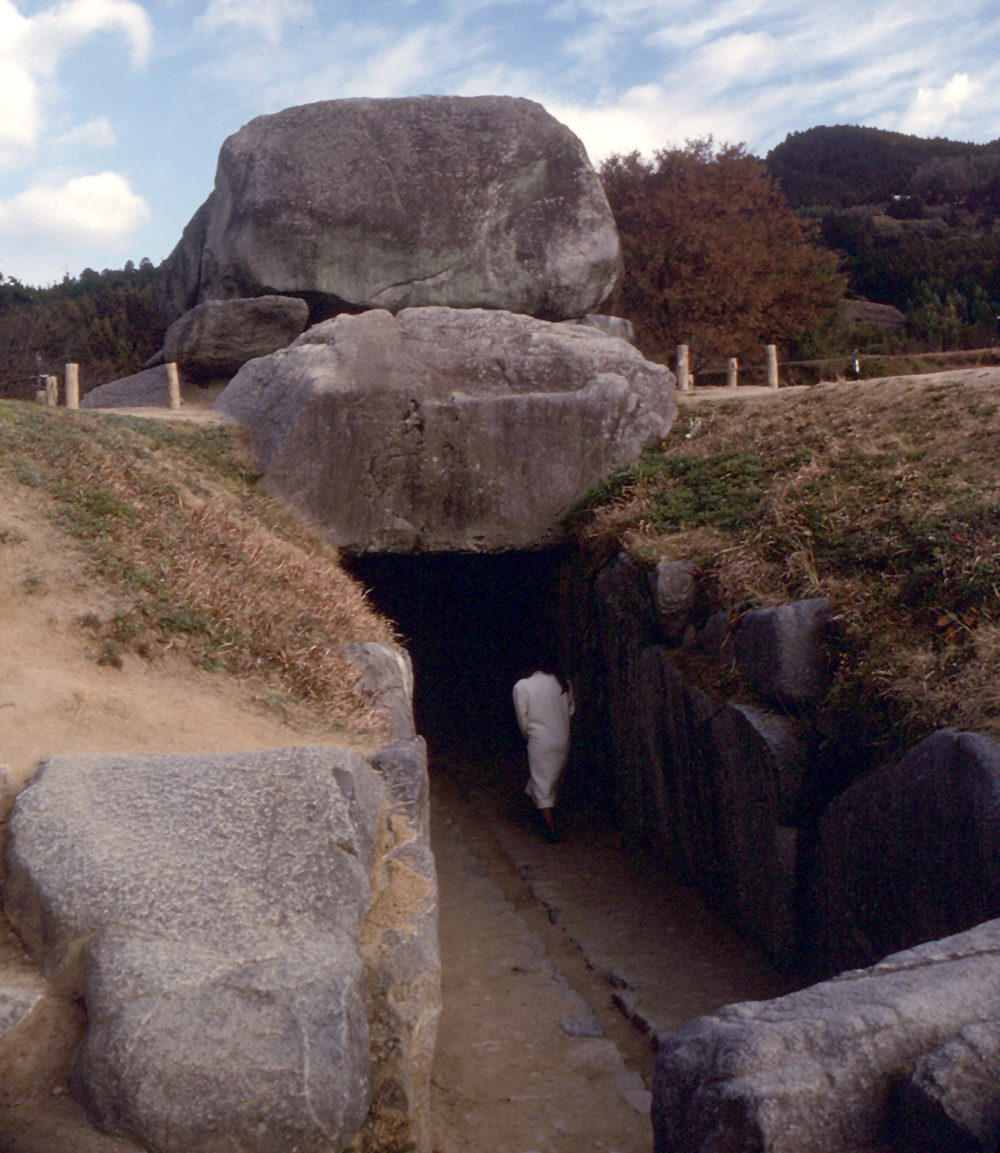
The stone chamber of Ishibutai Kofun, said to be the tomb of Soga no Umako, Asuka, Nara Prefecture (7th century)

== Types ==
=== Keyhole Kofun ===
Keyhole Kofun, or Zenpokoenfun, are a notable type of Japanese ancient tomb consisting of a square front part (前方部) and a circular back part (後円部). The part connecting the two is called the middle part (くびれ部), which looks like a keyhole when viewed from above.

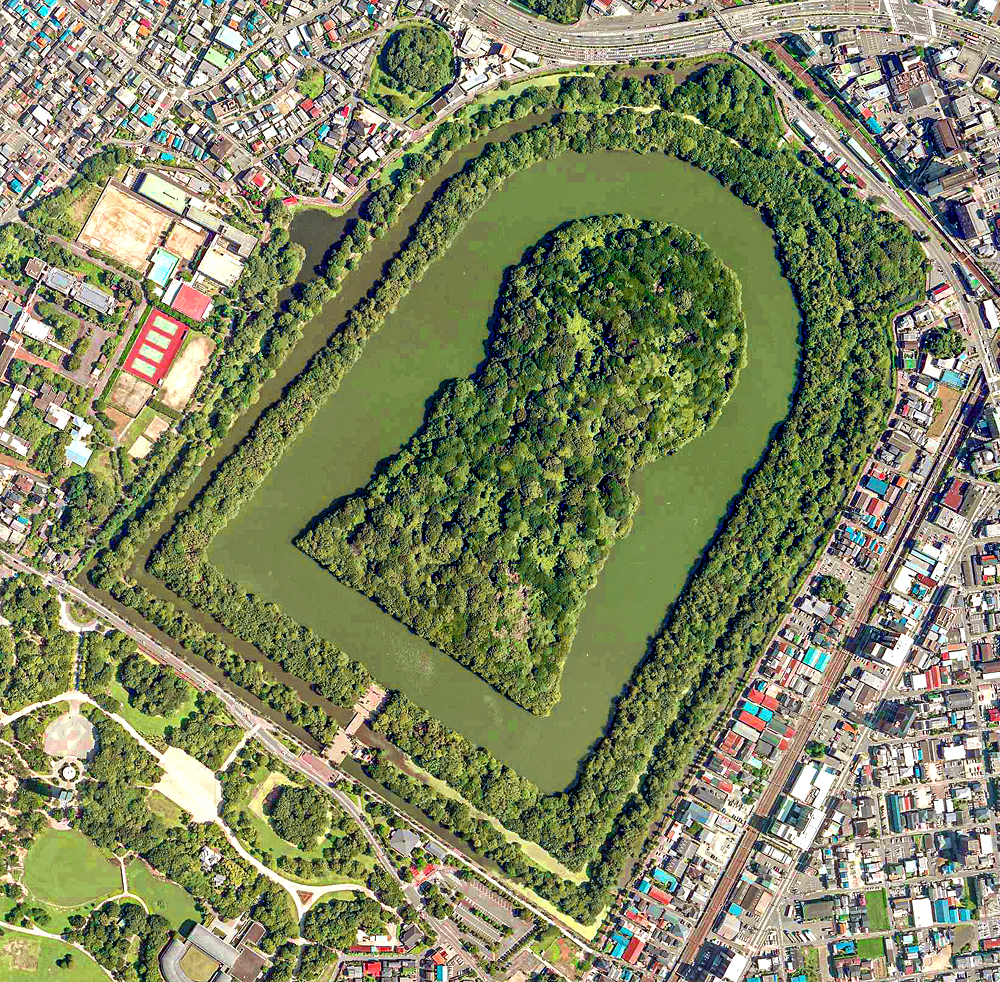
The Zenpokoenfun where Emperor Nintoku is buried in Mozu tombs

=== Round Kofun ===
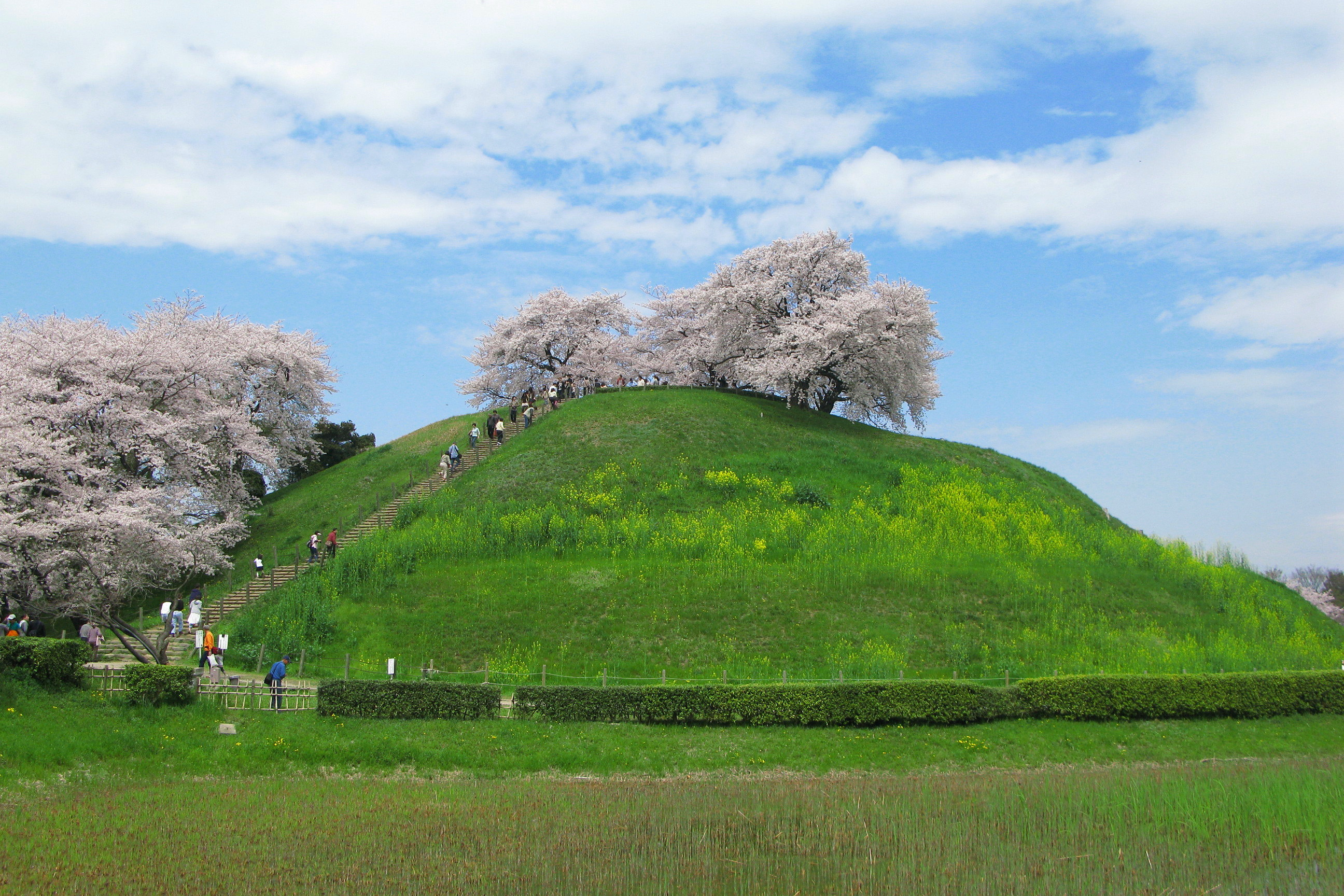
A round kofun

Round Kofun (円墳, enpun) are a kind of kofun that possesses only a round mound and lacks the square segment.

=== Square Kofun ===
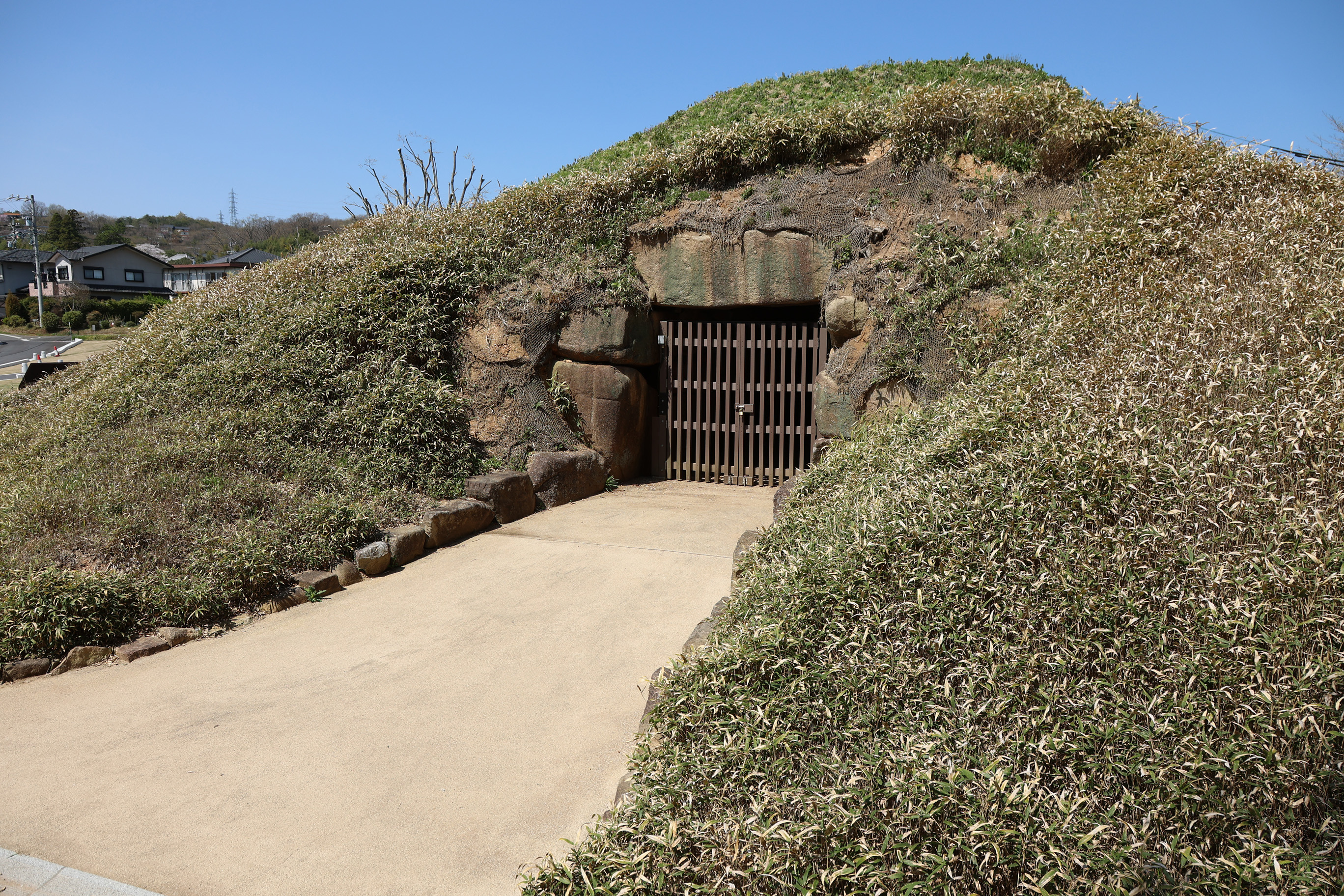
Otozuka Kofun, a square kofun

Square kofun (方墳, hōfun) are a kind of kofun that possesses only a square mound and lacks the round segment. They are typically relatively smaller than the other shapes of mounded tombs.

=== Scallop Kofun ===
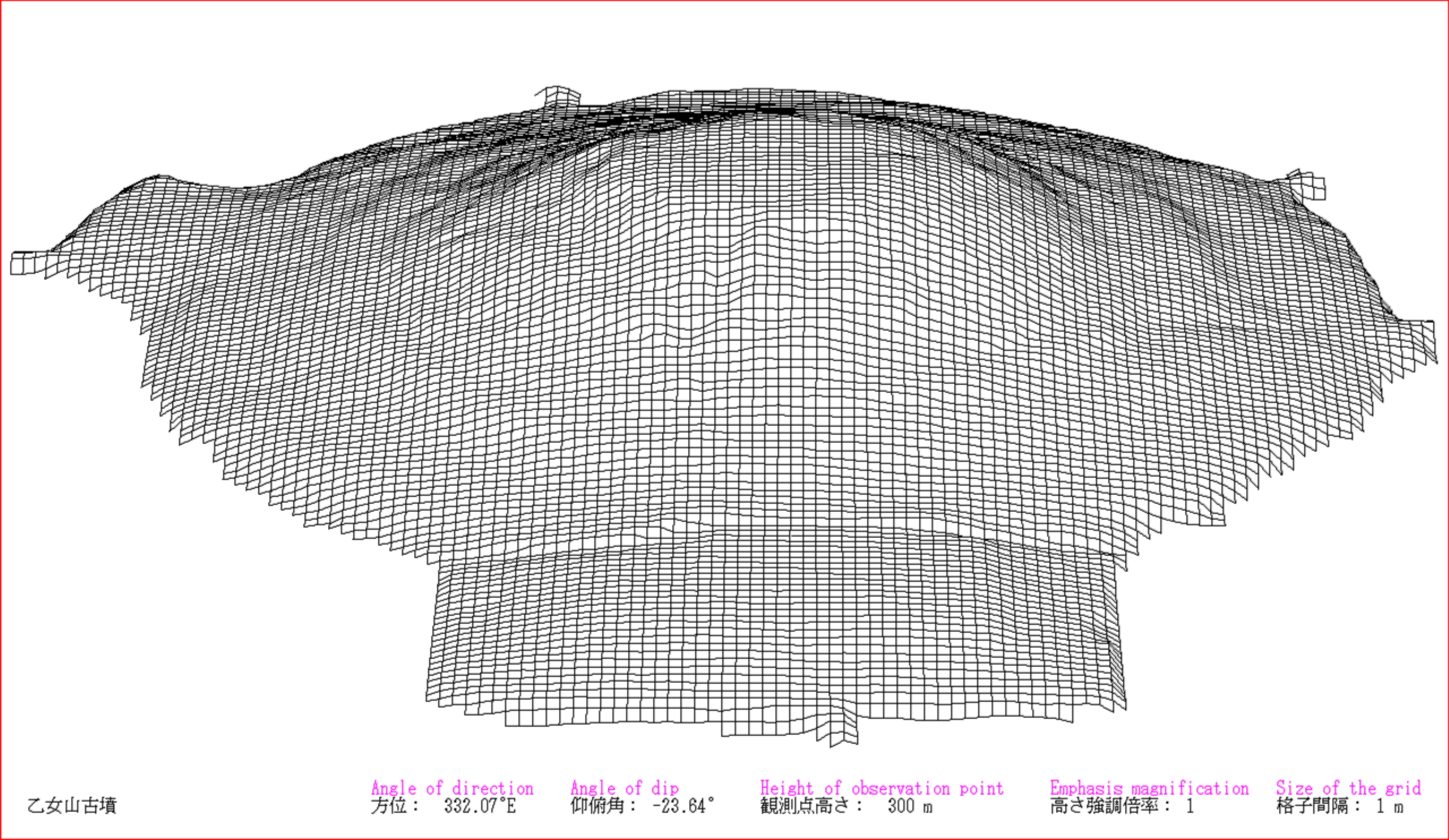
A scallop Kofun cgi

Scallop Kofun is a kind of kofun defined by a circular body with a small part extending. This can make it an intermediate between a Keyhole-shaped kofun and a circular-type kofun.

Famous examples include Hokenoyama Kofun in the Makimuku ruins, dated to around 250 AD, and Nyotaizan Kofun.

=== Octagonal Kofun ===
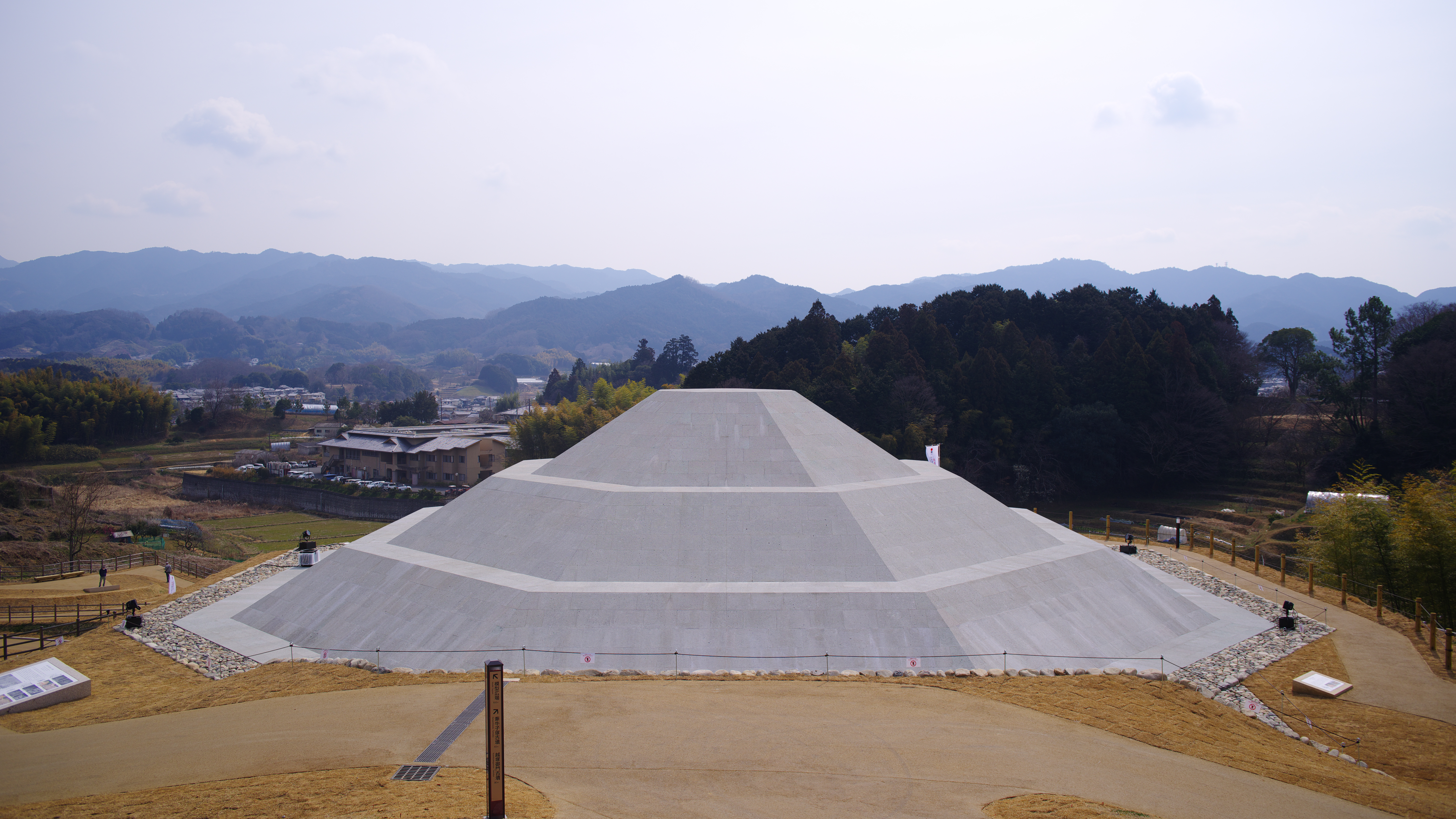
Kengoshizuka Kofun, a notable Octagonal Kofun, where Empress Kōgyoku is buried

Octagonal Kofun (八角墳, hakkaku-fun) are a very rare kind of kofun characteristic of Emperors.

Many Japanese Emperors were buried in them including Empress Kōgyoku in Kengoshizuka Kofun, Emperor Tenji in his Mausoleum, and Emperor Jomei in Dannozuka Kofun

From the end of the 6th century to the beginning of the 7th, the tumuli of the monarchs changed from square hōfun tumuli to octagonal hakkaku-fun tumuli.

==== List of Octagonal Kofun ====
- Ise Kofun (Fujioka City)
- Inari Kofun
- Oichi No.1 Kofun
- Kajiyama Kofun
- Kengoshizuka Kofun
- Gobyo Kofun
- Takei temple ruins
- Dannozuka Kofun
- Tsukamyojin Kofun
- Nakaoyama Kofun
- Nakayamasōen Kofun
- King Noguchi Kofun
- Mitsuya Kofun
- Yoshida Kofun

=== Zenpō-kōhō-fun ===
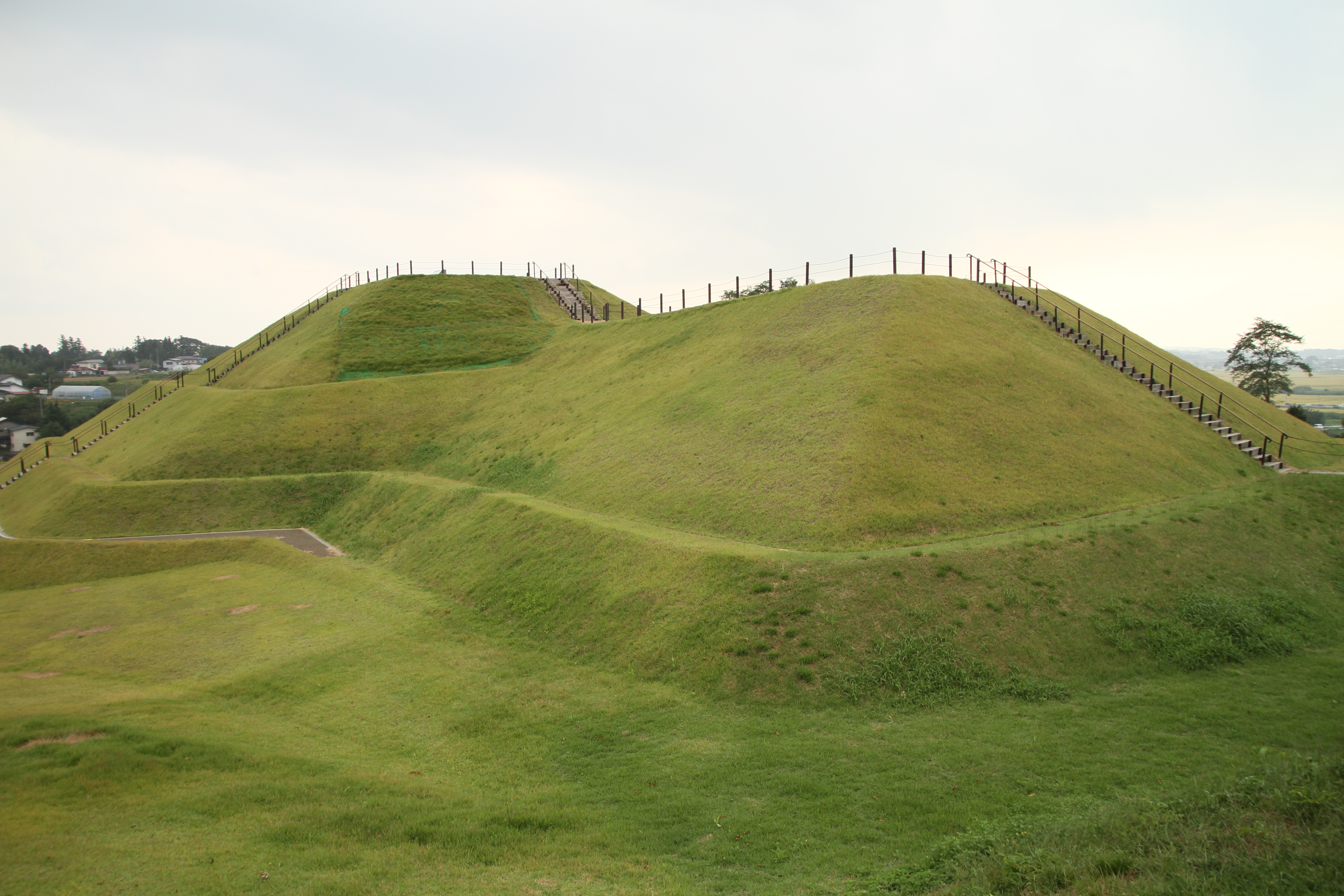
Ōyasuba Kofun, a Zenpō-kōhō-fun

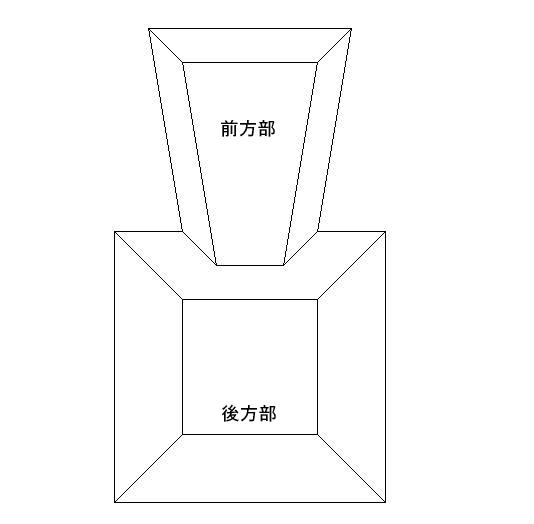
General diagram of a zenpō-kōhō-fun

zenpō-kōhō-fun (前方後方墳; two conjoined rectangles kofun) is a kind of kofun shaped somewhat like the more keyhole shaped Zenpokoenfun, but they have a square body rather than a circular one. They tend to be smaller than Zenpokoenfun. Yanaida Nunōyama Kofun is one of the largest of the type.

There is a specific style exemplified by Yadani Kofun and Jinyama Tumulus Cluster and Rokuji Kozuka Kofun and Tomisaki Kofungun of Ōzuka-Senbōyama Sites as yosumi-tosshutsugata (四隅突出形), which is square or rectangular, with protrusions on each of its four corners; however, it is unique in that it is not a true rectangle, but has a narrow waist, similar to a "two conjoined rectangles" type (zenpō-kōhō-fun (前方後方墳)). The slope of the mound is covered with fukiishi -like stones, with a row of larger stones marking its edge, and is surrounded by a two-meter wide moat. The yosumi-tosshutsugata style is unique to the late middle Yayoi period and is most prevalent in western Japan in areas influenced by the Izumo culture.

=== Joenkahofun ===
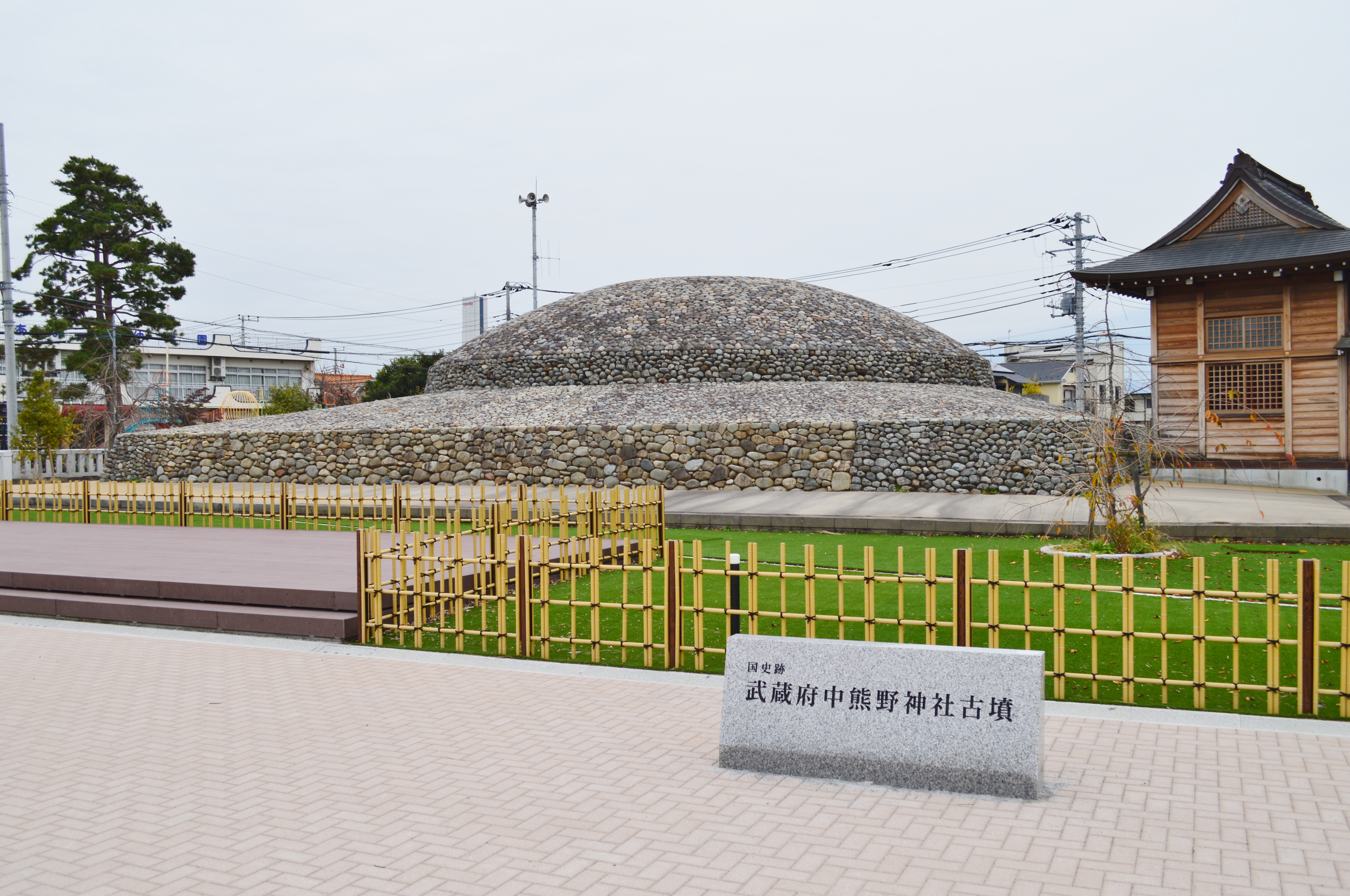
Musashi Fuchū Kumano Jinja Kofun, a Joenkahofun

Joenkahofun (上円下方墳) is a rare kind of kofun with a round dome top and a square bottom.

They are associated with the Asuka Period. Musashi Fuchū Kumano Jinja Kofun in Fuchū in Tokyo and Miyazuka Kofun are two notable examples.

==== List of Joenkahofun ====
- Ishinokarato Kofun
- Sanno-zuka Ancient Tomb
- Shimizu Yanagikita No. 1 Tomb
- Tenmondai Kounai Kofun
- Nochi Kubo Ancient Tomb
- Miyazuka Kofun
- Musashi Fuchū Kumano Jinja Kofun

=== Yokoanabo ===
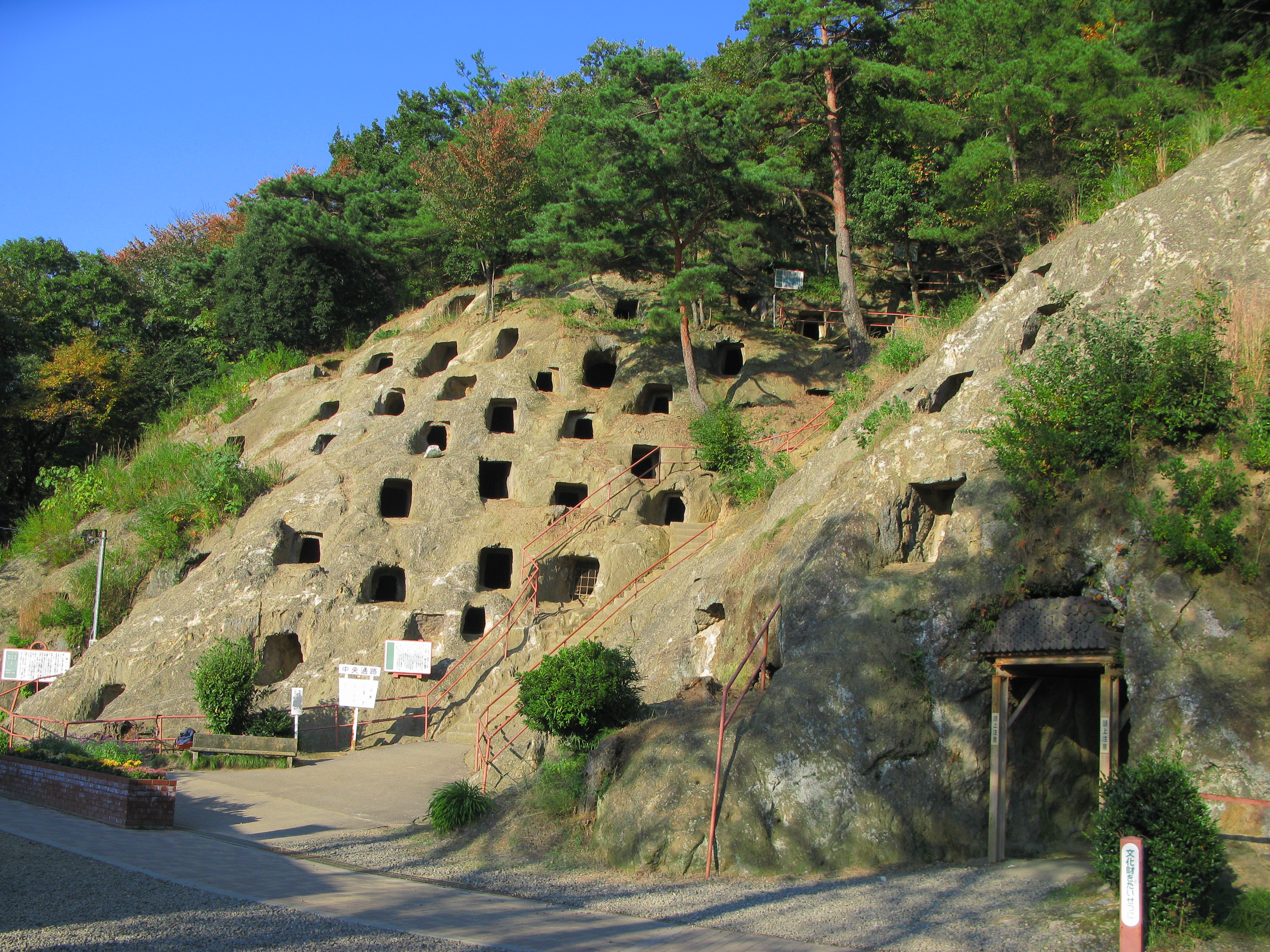
Yoshimi Hundred Caves, a cluster of yokoanabo

Yokoanabo (横穴墓; also read ōketsubo, lit. "horizontal hole grave") also sometimes referred to as yokoana (横穴) or yokoana kofun (横穴古墳) in Japanese are horizontal caves dug into cliffs and hillsides as graves for lower-ranking rulers. Unlike kofun, they were not built up out of material, but dug into the existing landscape. There is significant variation in the construction of yokoanabo, but the interior usually has at least a sendō (羨道), a horizontal hallway leading in from the entrance, and a genshitsu (玄室), the main chamber where the body or bodies lay, and the exterior usually has a zenteibu (前庭部), a sort of open space out front which may have been used as a location for rituals before internment of the remains.

== UNESCO Kofun Group ==
This list includes the "Mozu-Furuichi Kofun Group: Mounded Tombs of Ancient Japan," which was inscribed as a UNESCO World Heritage Site on 6 July 2019.

Name	Coordinates	Property	Buffer Zone
Aoyama Kofun	34°33′21″N 135°36′02″E	0.51 ha (1.3 acres)	
Chuai-tenno-ryo Kofun	34°33′57″N 135°35′39″E	9.34 ha (23.1 acres)	350 ha (860 acres)
Dogameyama Kofun	34°33′46″N 135°28′56″E	0.06 ha (0.15 acres)	
Genemonyama Kofun	34°33′55″N 135°29′29″E	0.09 ha (0.22 acres)	
Gobyoyama Kofun	34°33′17″N 135°29′27″E	5.4 ha (13 acres)	
Hachizuka Kofun	34°34′05″N 135°35′44″E	0.31 ha (0.77 acres)	
Hakayama Kofun	34°33′28″N 135°36′16″E	4.34 ha (10.7 acres)	
Hakuchoryo Kofun	34°33′04″N 135°36′16″E	5.65 ha (14.0 acres)	
Hanzei-tenno-ryo Kofun	34°34′34″N 135°29′18″E	4.06 ha (10.0 acres)	
Hatazuka Kofun	34°33′24″N 135°28′58″E	0.38 ha (0.94 acres)	
Hazamiyama Kofun	34°33′42″N 135°36′08″E	1.5 ha (3.7 acres)	
Higashiumazuka Kofun	34°33′50″N 135°36′44″E	0.03 ha (0.074 acres)	
Higashiyama Kofun	34°33′42″N 135°36′21″E	0.41 ha (1.0 acre)	
Ingyo-tenno-ryo Kofun	34°34′23″N 135°37′00″E	6.43 ha (15.9 acres)	
Itasuke Kofun	34°33′11″N 135°29′09″E	2.42 ha (6.0 acres)	
Joganjiyama Kofun	34°33′25″N 135°36′07″E	0.52 ha (1.3 acres)	
Komoyamazuka Kofun	34°34′01″N 135°29′03″E	0.08 ha (0.20 acres)	
Komuroyama Kofun	34°34′05″N 135°36′34″E	2.92 ha (7.2 acres)	
Kurizuka Kofun	34°33′46″N 135°36′45″E	0.11 ha (0.27 acres)	
Magodayuyama Kofun	34°33′36″N 135°29′06″E	0.45 ha (1.1 acres)	
Maruhoyama Kofun	34°34′01″N 135°29′07″E	0.69 ha (1.7 acres)	
Minegazuka Kofun	34°33′08″N 135°35′50″E	1.12 ha (2.8 acres)	
Mukohakayama Kofun	34°33′26″N 135°36′22″E	0.33 ha (0.82 acres)	
Nabezuka Kofun	34°34′18″N 135°36′53″E	0.14 ha (0.35 acres)	
Nagatsuka Kofun	34°33′28″N 135°29′15″E	0.51 ha (1.3 acres)	
Nagayama Kofun	34°34′05″N 135°29′12″E	0.97 ha (2.4 acres)	
Nakatsuhime-no-mikoto-ryo Kofun	34°34′12″N 135°36′45″E	7.23 ha (17.9 acres)	
Nakayamazuka Kofun	34°34′05″N 135°36′49″E	0.24 ha (0.59 acres)	
Nintoku-tenno-ryo Kofun, Chayama Kofun and Daianjiyama Kofun	34°33′53″N 135°29′16″E	46.4 ha (115 acres)	
Nisanzai Kofun	34°32′45″N 135°29′58″E	10.53 ha (26.0 acres)	
Nishiumazuka Kofun	34°33′22″N 135°36′24″E	0.07 ha (0.17 acres)	
Nonaka Kofun	34°33′32″N 135°36′16″E	0.19 ha (0.47 acres)	
Ojin-tenno-ryo Kofun, Konda-maruyama Kofun and Futatsuzuka Kofun	34°33′44″N 135°36′34″E	28.92 ha (71.5 acres)	
Osamezuka Kofun	34°33′32″N 135°29′17″E	0.07 ha (0.17 acres)	
Otorizuka Kofun	34°34′01″N 135°36′32″E	0.51 ha (1.3 acres)	
Richu-tenno-ryo Kofun	34°33′14″N 135°28′39″E	17.3 ha (43 acres)	
Shichikannon Kofun	34°33′24″N 135°28′47″E	0.09 ha (0.22 acres)	
Suketayama Kofun	34°34′05″N 135°36′47″E	0.12 ha (0.30 acres)	
Tatsusayama Kofun	34°33′40″N 135°29′00″E	0.34 ha (0.84 acres)	
Terayama-minamiyama Kofun	34°33′22″N 135°28′48″E	0.42 ha (1.0 acre)	
Tsudo-shiroyama Kofun	34°34′55″N 135°35′37″E	4.74 ha (11.7 acres)	23 ha (57 acres)
Tsukamawari Kofun	34°33′46″N 135°29′26″E	0.07 ha (0.17 acres)	
Yashimazuka Kofun	34°34′05″N 135°36′52″E	0.25 ha (0.62 acres)	
Zenemonyama Kofun	34°33′10″N 135°29′12″E	0.1 ha (0.25 acres)	
Zenizuka Kofun	34°33′19″N 135°29′04″E	0.3 ha (0.74 acres)	

== Aerial photos ==
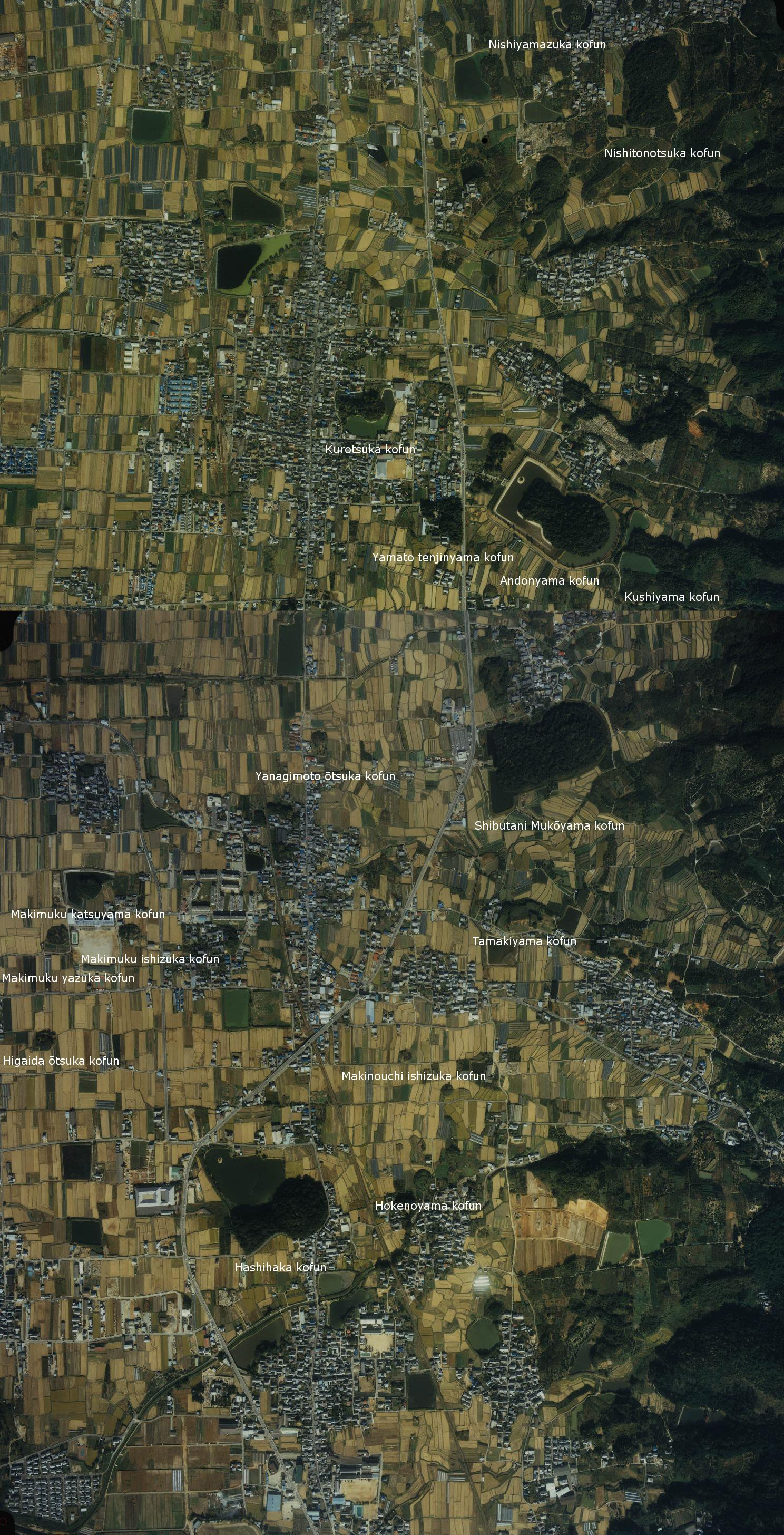
Oyamato, Yanagimoto and Makimuku Kofun Group, Nara Prefecture, 3rd century

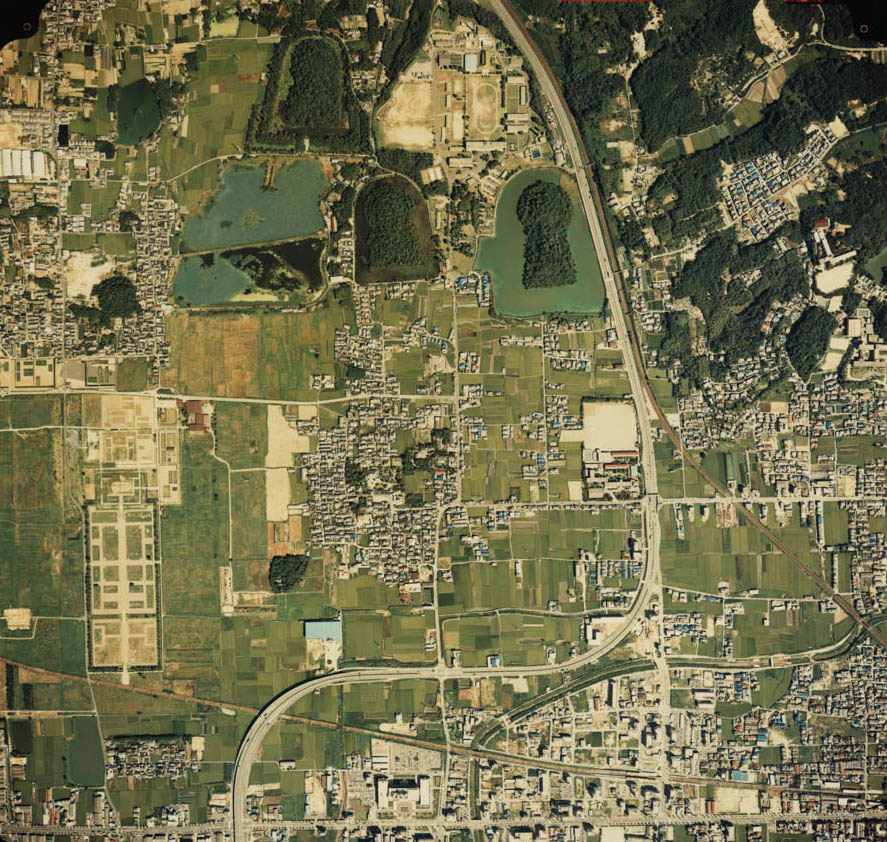
Saki Tatanami Kofun Group and the Heijō-kyō site, Nara Prefecture, 4th century

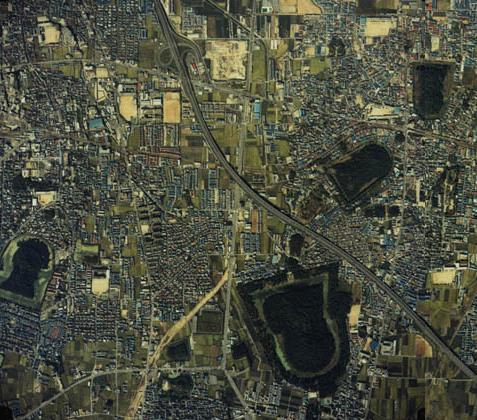
Furuichi Kofun Group, Osaka Prefecture, 5th century

== See also ==
- Yokoanabo
- empun
- Ernest Satow, a British diplomat who wrote about kofun in Kozuke for the Asiatic Society of Japan
- Fukiishi, stones used to cover kofun
- hotategai-gata
- Joenkahofun
- Kofun system
- Octagonal Kofun
- square-type kofun
- Turtleback tomb
- William Gowland, a British engineer who made the first survey for Saki kofun group
- Zenpokoenfun
- zenpō-kōhō-fun (前方後方墳)
