= Mitsuya Kofun =

Kofun period burial mound in Gunma, Japan

- 三津屋古墳 (Japanese)
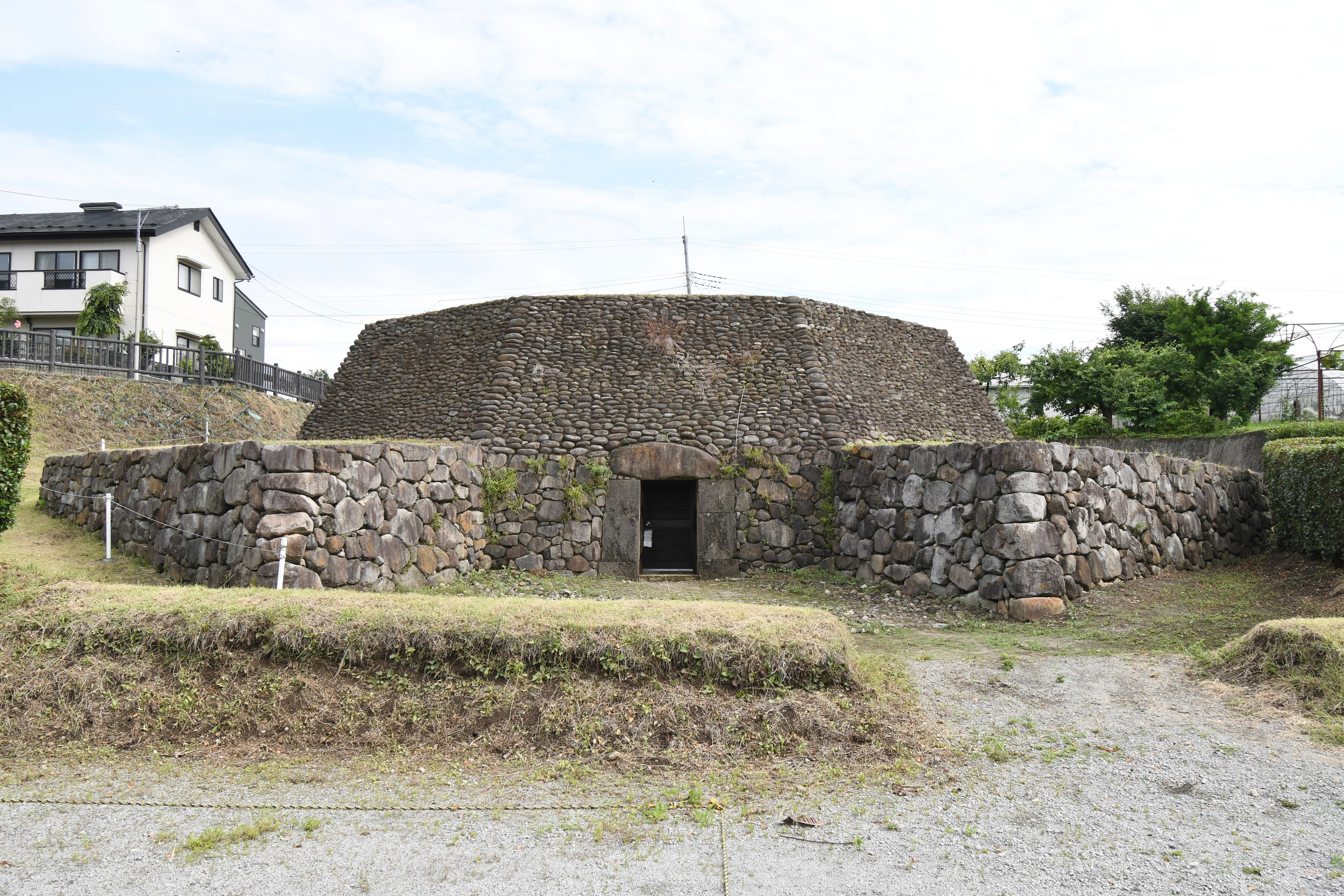
- Mitsuya Kofun

- Mitsuya Kofun Mitsuya Kofun (Japan)
- 36°26′6.15″N 139°1′32.52″E
- Type: Kofun
- Periods: Kofun period
- Location: 2037-1 Okubo-cho, Yoshioka, Gunma
- Region: Kantō region

History
- Built: late 7th century

Site notes
- Public access: Yes (park, entry possible)
- Gunma Prefecture Historic Site

The Mitsuya Kofun (三津屋古墳) is a Kofun period burial mound, located in the Okubo neighborhood of the town of Yoshioka, Gunma in the Kantō region of Japan. The tumulus was designated a Gunma Prefecture Historic Site in 1995, with the area under protection expanded in 2001..

== Overview ==
The Mitsuya Kofun is constructed on the left bank of the Goōzu River, which flows into the Tone River, at the eastern foot of Mount Haruna in central Gunma Prefecture. The stone burial chamber has been significantly damaged by grave robbery in premodern times, and an archaeological excavation was conducted in 1993.

The mound is a very rare octagonal kofun (八角墳, hakkaku-fun), more commonly associated with imperial tombs in the Kinai region. The mound was constructed in two stages, using a rammed earth-like horizontal stacking method approximately ten centimeters thick. Fukiishi revetment stones are visible on the outer surface of the mound, which is surrounded by a moat. The fukiishi consist of mountain stones in the lower section and flat river stones in the upper section, with the upper section being particularly elaborately constructed. The tumulus measures approximately 23.8 meters in diagonal length and 4.5 meters in remaining height, with each side of the octagon measuring approximately nine meters in the lower section and six meters in the upper section. It is presumed that the Tang dynasty chi unit of measurement was used during its construction.

The burial facility is a double-chambered horizontal-entry stone chamber, with the back wall of the burial chamber opening to the south, centered on the octagon. The burial chamber appears to have been constructed using a combination of natural, irregularly shaped stones, with some cut stones used in parts. It has a forecourt attached to its front. Due to looting, no grave goods have been found.

This Mitsuya Kofun is estimated to have been constructed around the late 7th century, during the final period of the Kofun period.

The tumulus has been restored and maintained to its original appearance, and the interior is open to visitors (open 8:00-17:00). It is located approximately 2.6 kilometers north of Gunma-Sōja Station on the Jōetsu Line .

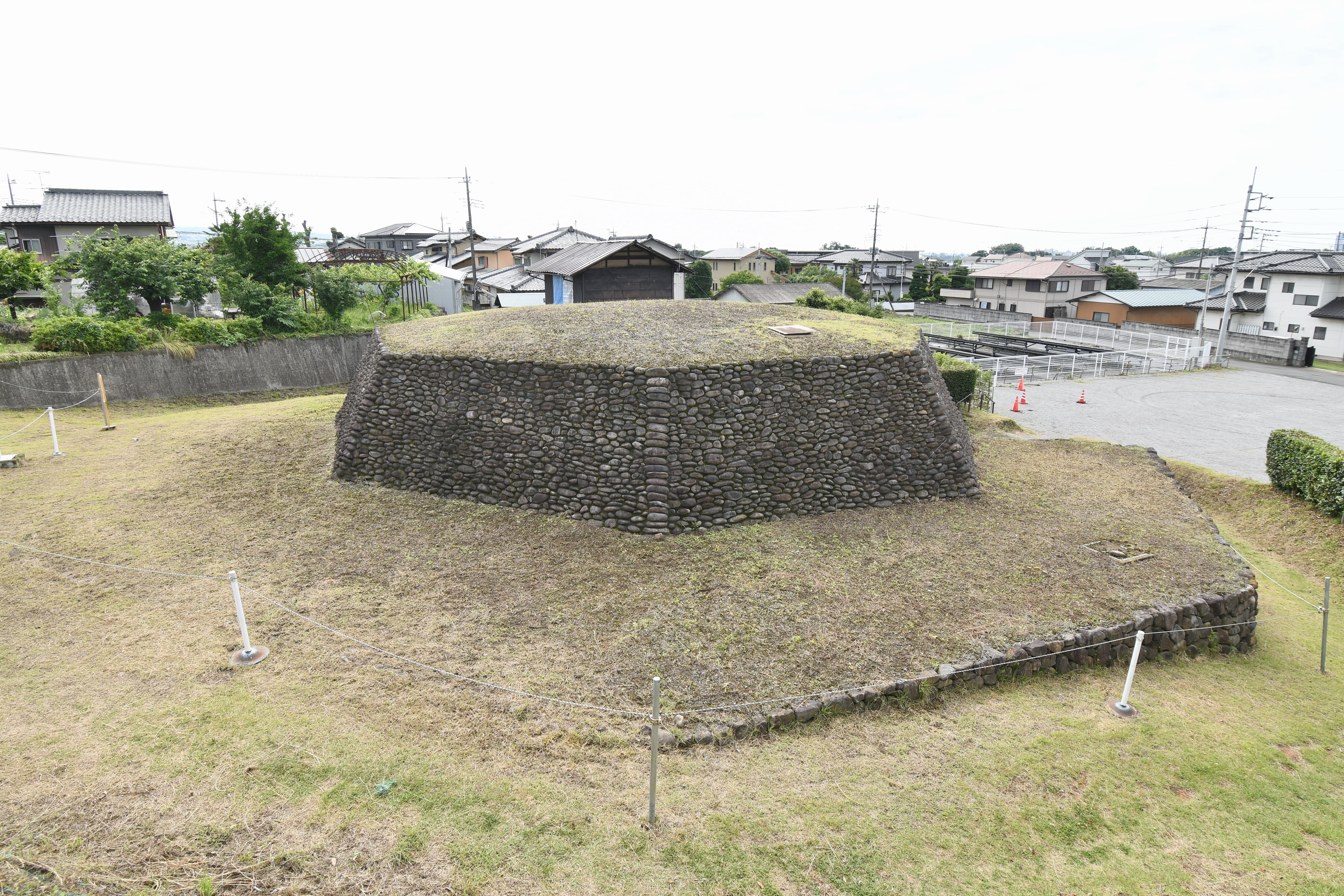
View from behind

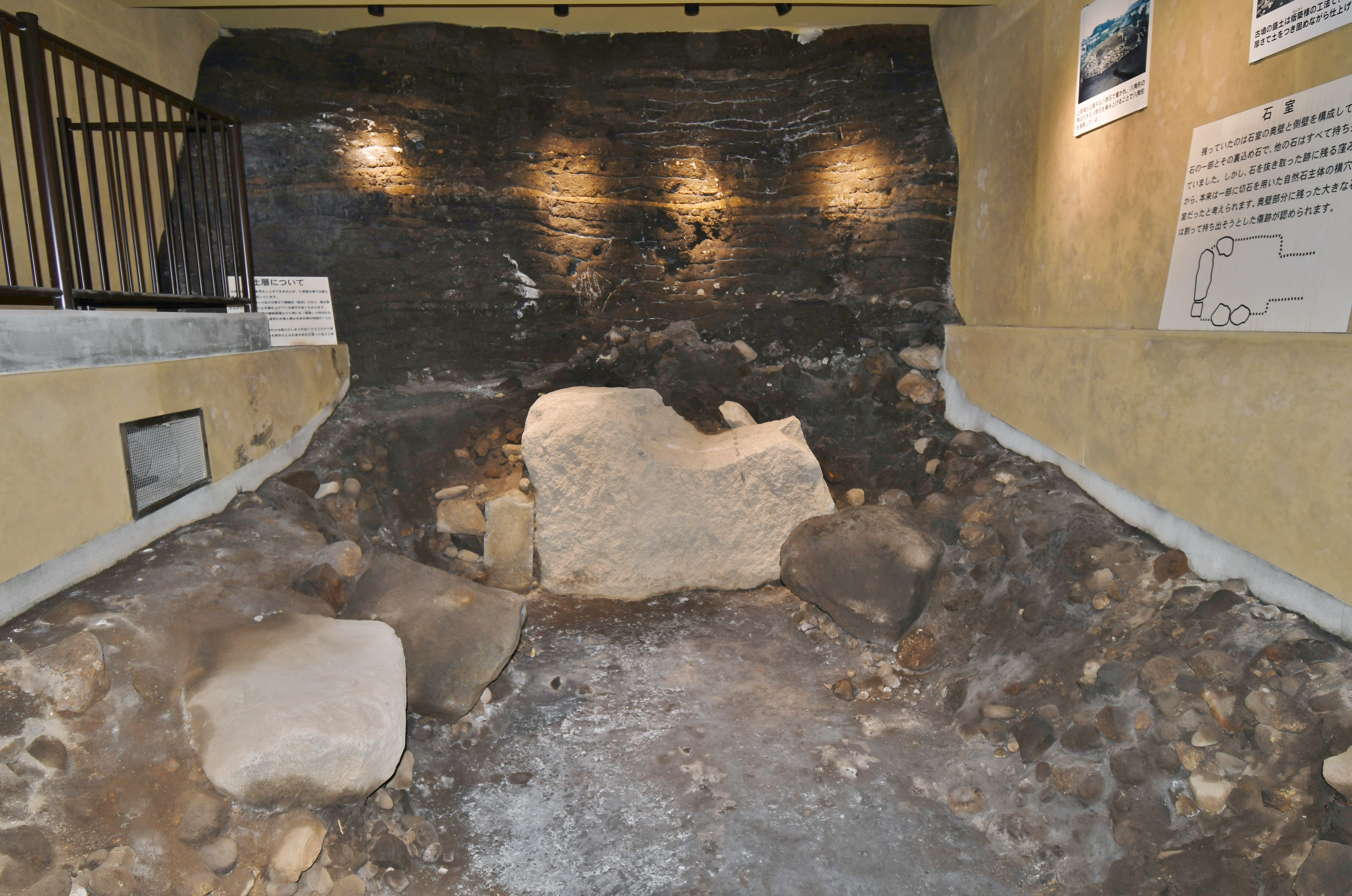
Burial Chamber

== See also ==
- List of Historic Sites of Japan (Gunma)
