= Ichinomiya Asama Shrine =

Ichinomiya Asama Shrine may refer to:

- Ichinomiya Asama Shrine (Fuefuki),
- Ichinomiya Asama Shrine (Ichikawamisato)
