= Ichinomiya Sengen Shrine =

Shinto shrine in Yamanashi prefecture, Japan

Ichinomiya Sengen Jinja 一宮浅間神社
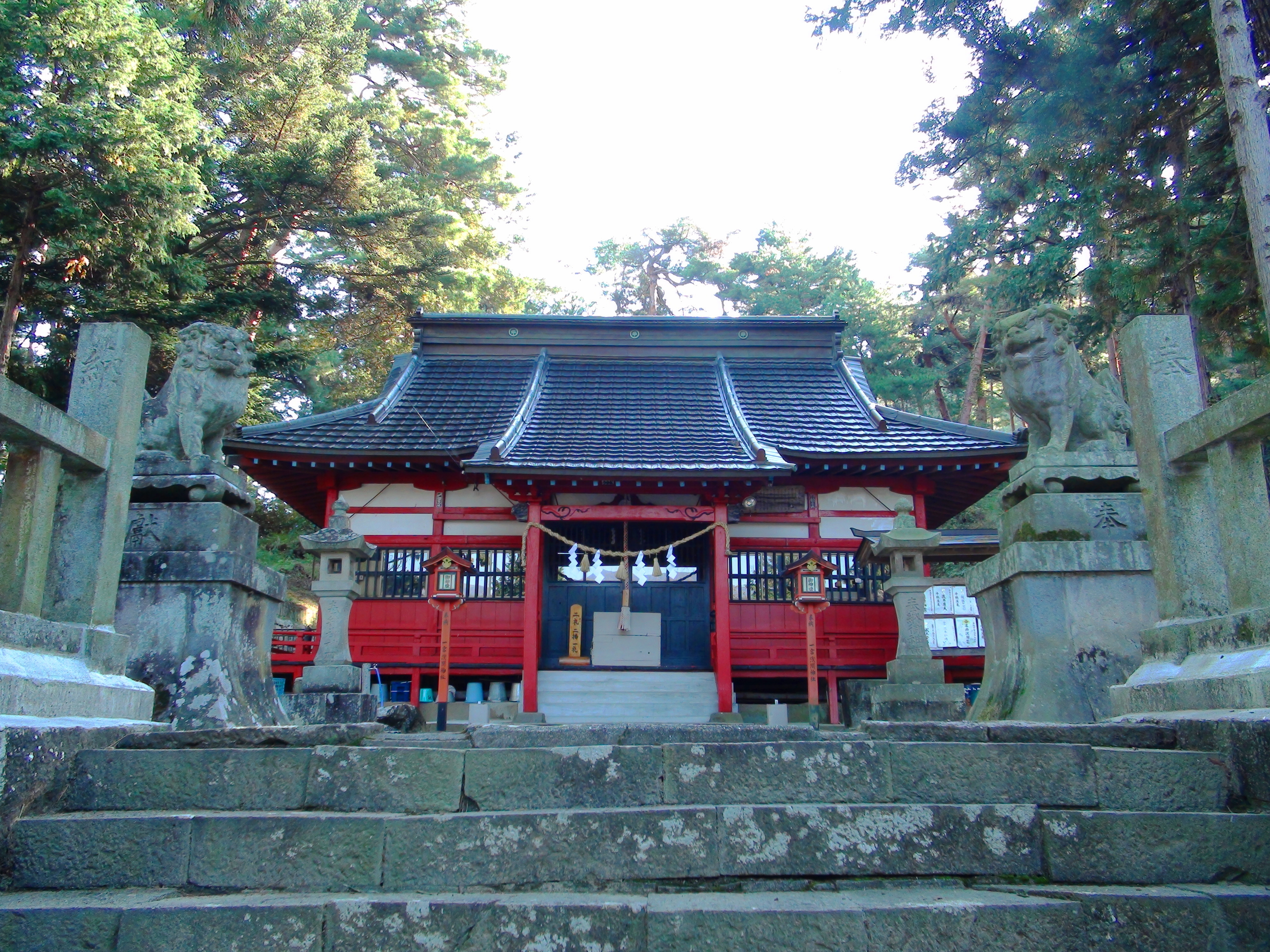
- Haiden of Ichinomiya Sengen Jinja

- Location within Yamanashi Prefecture Location within Japan

Religion
- Affiliation: Shinto
- Deity: Konohanasakuya-hime
- Festival: November 3
- Type: Asama Shrine

Location
- Location: 3696 Miyamoto, Takata, Ichikawamisato-cho, Nishiyatsushiro-gun, Yamanashi-ken 409-3606
- Interactive map of Ichinomiya Sengen Jinja 一宮浅間神社
- Coordinates: 35°33′15.12″N 138°29′24.58″E

Architecture
- Style: Nagare-zukuri

Website
- Official website

The Ichinomiya Sengen Jinja (一宮浅間神社) is a Shintō shrine in the Takata neighborhood of the town of Ichikawamisato, Nishiyatsushiro District in Yamanashi Prefecture, Japan. It is one of two shrines which vie for the title of ichinomiya of the former Kai Province. The main festival of the shrine is held annually on November 3. It is also known as simply the Ichikawa Ichinomiya (市川一の宮) or the Ichinomiya Myōjin (一ノ宮明神) or the Ichinomiya Asama Jinja.

== Enshrined kami ==
The primary kami at the Ichinomiya Sengen Jinja is:

- Konohanasakuya-hime (木花咲耶姫), the daughter of Ōyamatsu-no-mikoto (大山祇命)

The secondary kami of the shrine are:

- Ninigi-no-mikoto (瓊瓊杵命), the grandson of Amaterasu, and great-grandfather of Emperor Jimmu, consort of Konohanasakuya-hime
- Hikohohodemi no Mikoto (彦火火出見命), son of Konohanasakuya-hime and Ninigi.

== History ==
The foundation of the Ichinomiya Sengen Jinja predates the historical period. Per shrine tradition, it was established in reign of the semi-legendary Emperor Keikō (reigned 71 – 130 AD), to placate Mount Fuji after a huge eruption. While located near the site of the ancient provincial temple of Kai Province, the Kai Kokubun-ji and the provincial capital during the Nara and Heian periods and while mentioned in the Engishiki records of 926 AD as a myōjin taisha (名神大社), there is controversy as to whether the Heian period records are referring to this shrine, or to the Ichinomiya Asama Jinja in the city of Fuefuki. In favor of this shine's claims are its location (in an area which was named "Ichinomiya") and the fact that the Fuefuki area did not really develop as the center of the province until under the Takeda clan in the Muromachi period. The shrine in Ichikawamisato received stipends from the Takeda clan, and under Tokugawa Ieyasu received territory, tax relief for the use of bamboo and trees on shrine territory. The exiled Imperial Prince Priest Ryōjun, the eighth son of Emperor Go-Yōzei was sent to this shrine in 1643.The current Honden of the shrine dates from 1703.

During the post-Meiji restoration system of State Shinto, the shrine was officially designated a village shrine, in the Modern system of ranked Shinto shrines.

The shrine is a 12-minute walk from Ichikawa-Daimon Station on the JR East Minobu Line.

== Gallery ==
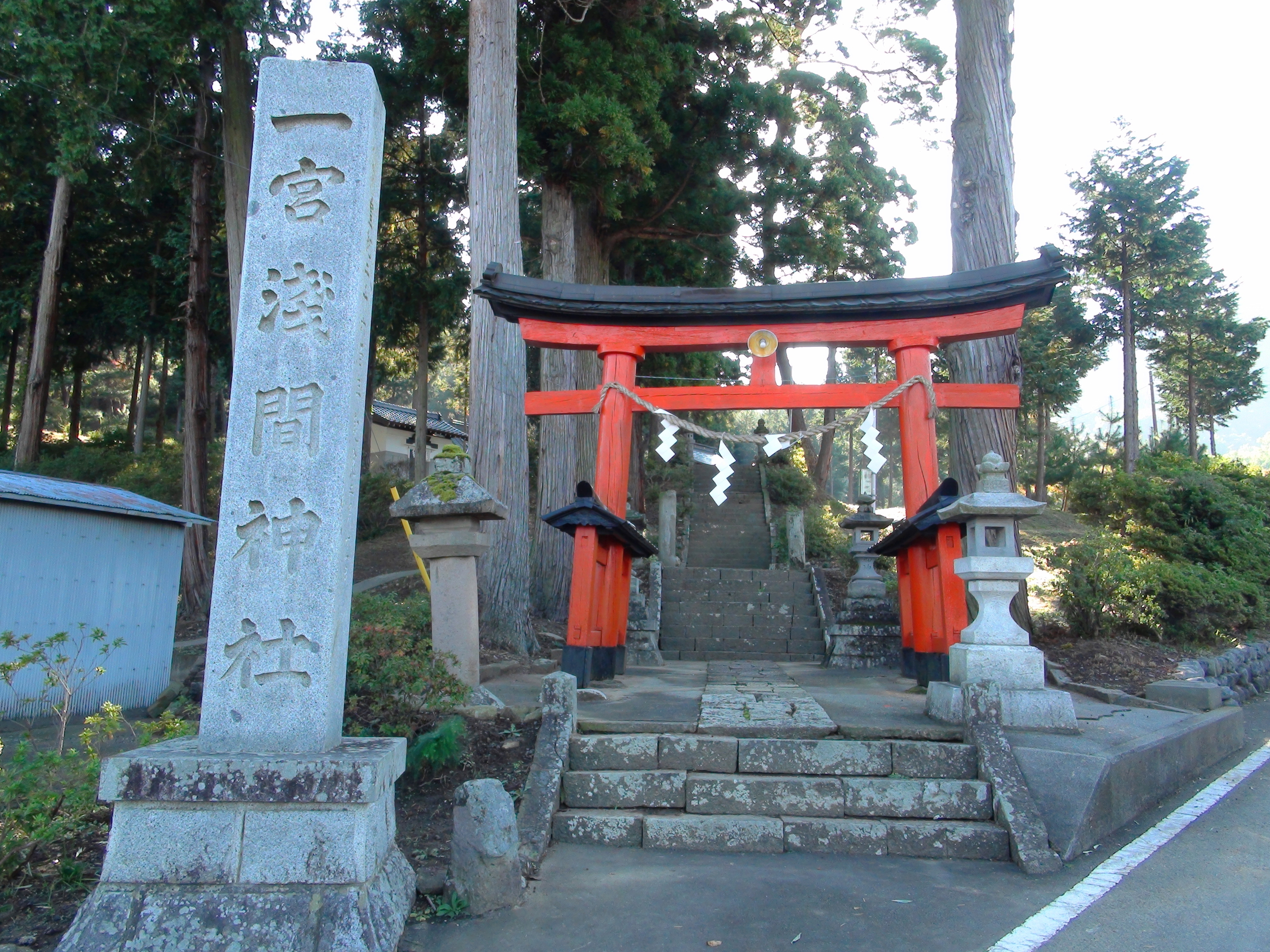
Ichi-no-Torii

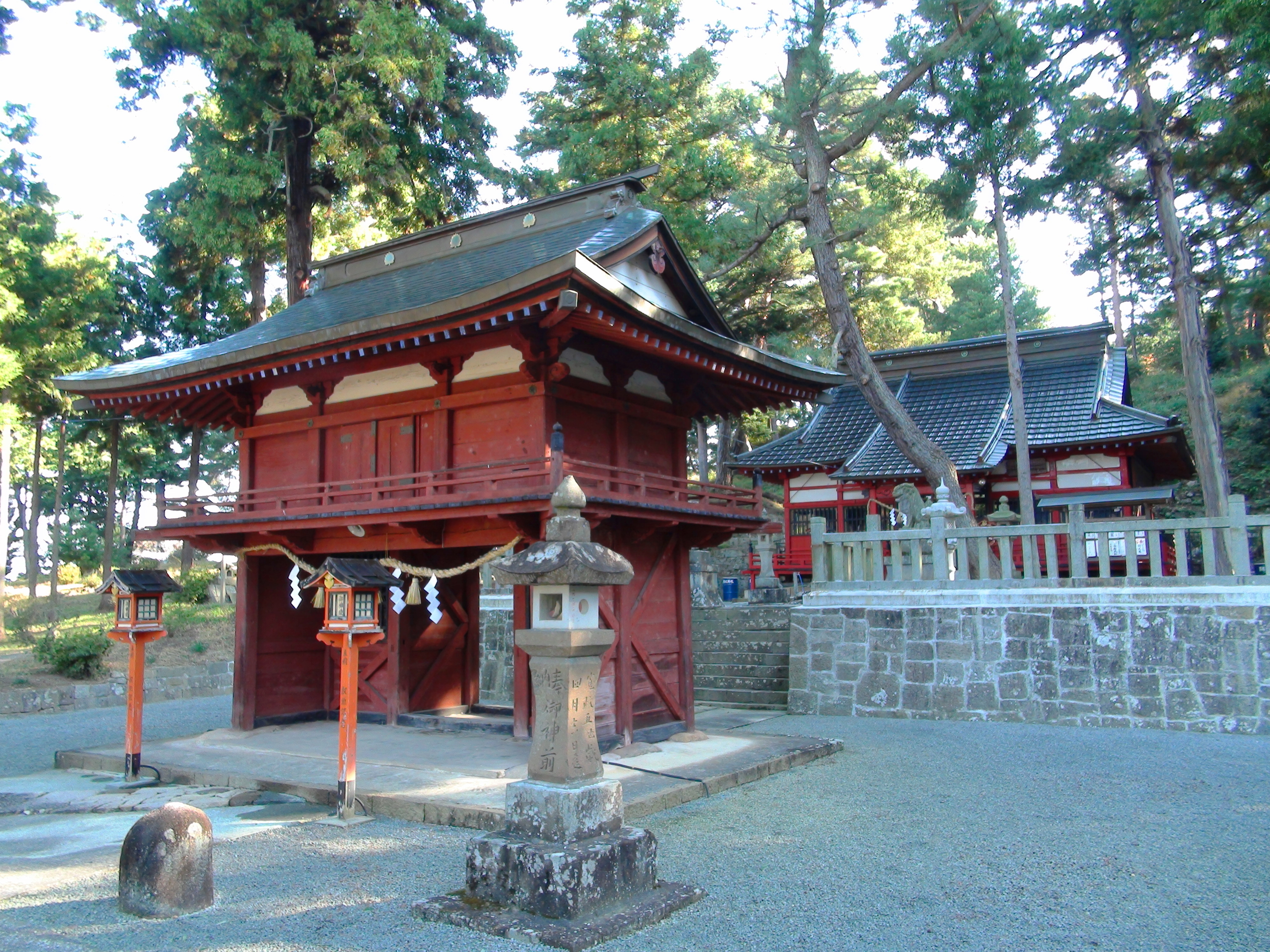
Romon

Bronze Mirror

== Cultural properties ==
=== Important Cultural Properties ===
- Shinju-kyo (神獣鏡), Eastern Wu. This bronze mirror was recovered from the nearby Toriiharakitsunezuka Kofun burial mound. The mirror has an engraving around its rim, giving the Chinese Regnal year of 238 AD, a date corresponding to then Three Kingdoms period of Chinese history. It is the earliest positively dated mirror in Japan and raises the intriguing possibility that trade existed between proto-Japanese Kofun period states and the mainland of Asia during the Kofun period. The mirror was designated an National Important Cultural Property on June 6, 1979.

=== Yamanashi Prefecture Designated Tangible Cultural Properties ===
- Shinju-kyo (神獣鏡), Eastern Wu. This bronze mirror was excavated in 1898 along with the above-mentioned Divine Beast Mirror. It has a plain, flat rim with a double comb-tooth pattern, dividing it into an inner and outer section.

== See also ==
- List of Shinto shrines
- Ichinomiya
- Asama Shrine
