= Kai Kokubun-ji =

Heian period Buddhist temple in Fuefuki, Japan

- 甲斐国分寺
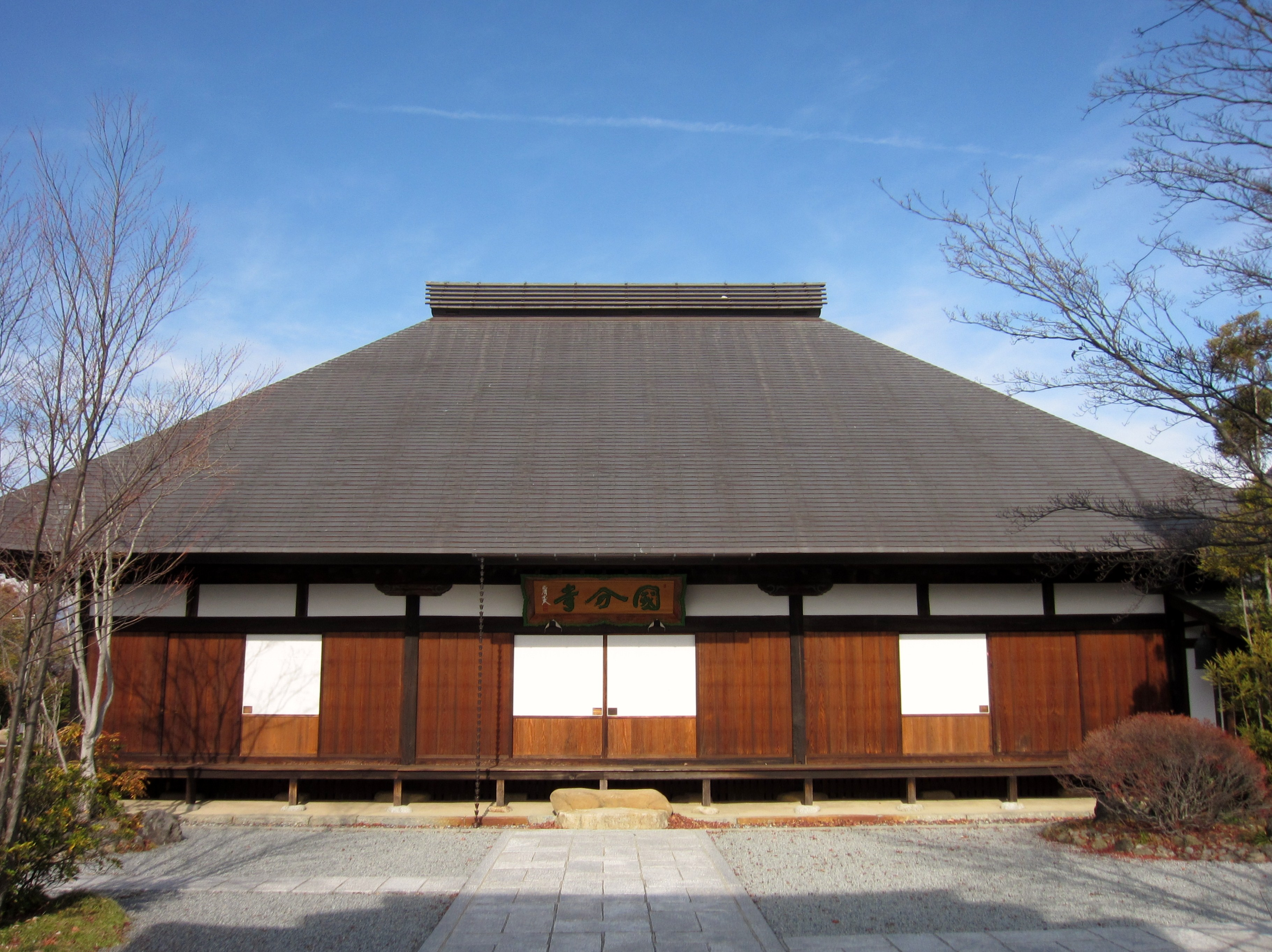
- Hondo of the Kai Kokubun-ji

- Location within Yamanashi Prefecture Location within Japan

Religion
- Affiliation: Buddhist
- Deity: Yakushi Nyōrai
- Rite: Myōshin-ji branch of Rinzai Zen

Location
- Location: Fuefuki, Yamanashi
- Country: Japan
- Interactive map of Kai Kokubun-ji
- Coordinates: 35°38′19″N 138°41′01″E

Architecture
- Founder: Emperor Shōmu
- Completed: early Heian period

Website
- Official website
- National Historic Site of Japan

The Kai Kokubun-ji (甲斐国分寺) is a Buddhist temple located in the city of Fuefuki, Yamanashi, Japan. It belongs to the Myōshin-ji branch of the Rinzai school of Japanese Zen and its honzon is a hibutsu statue of Yakushi Nyōrai. It is the descendant of one of the provincial temples established by Emperor Shōmu during the Nara period (710 – 794) for the purpose of promoting Buddhism as the national religion of Japan and standardizing control of the imperial rule to the provinces. The temple's Main Hall, Yakushi-dō, Rōmon, temple plaque, waniguchi, roof bracket and a woodblock for printing amulets are all designated Tangible Cultural Properties of Fuefuki City.

The ruins of the Nara period temple are adjacent to the modern temple and were designated as a National Historic Site in 1922.

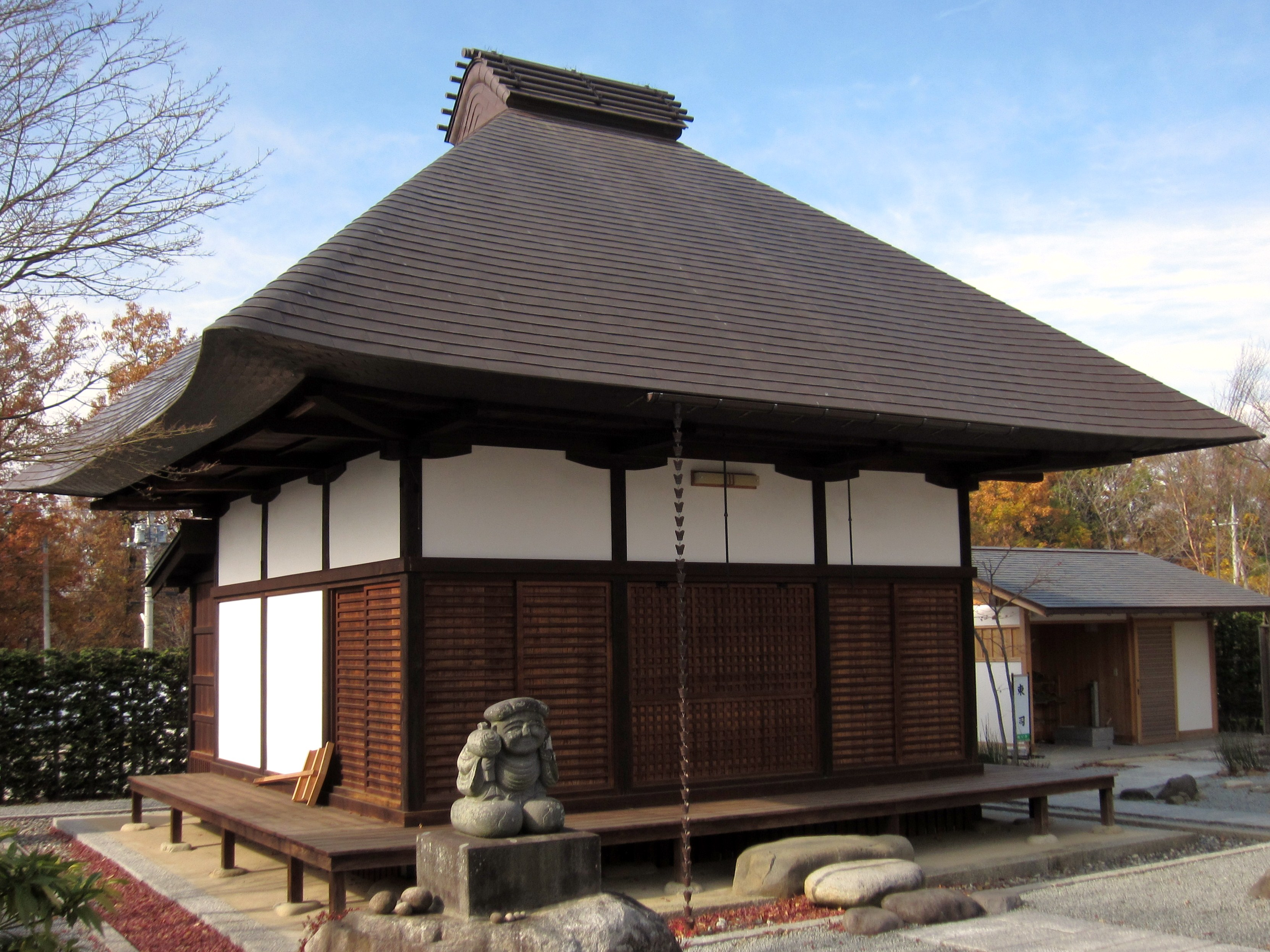
Yakushi-dō

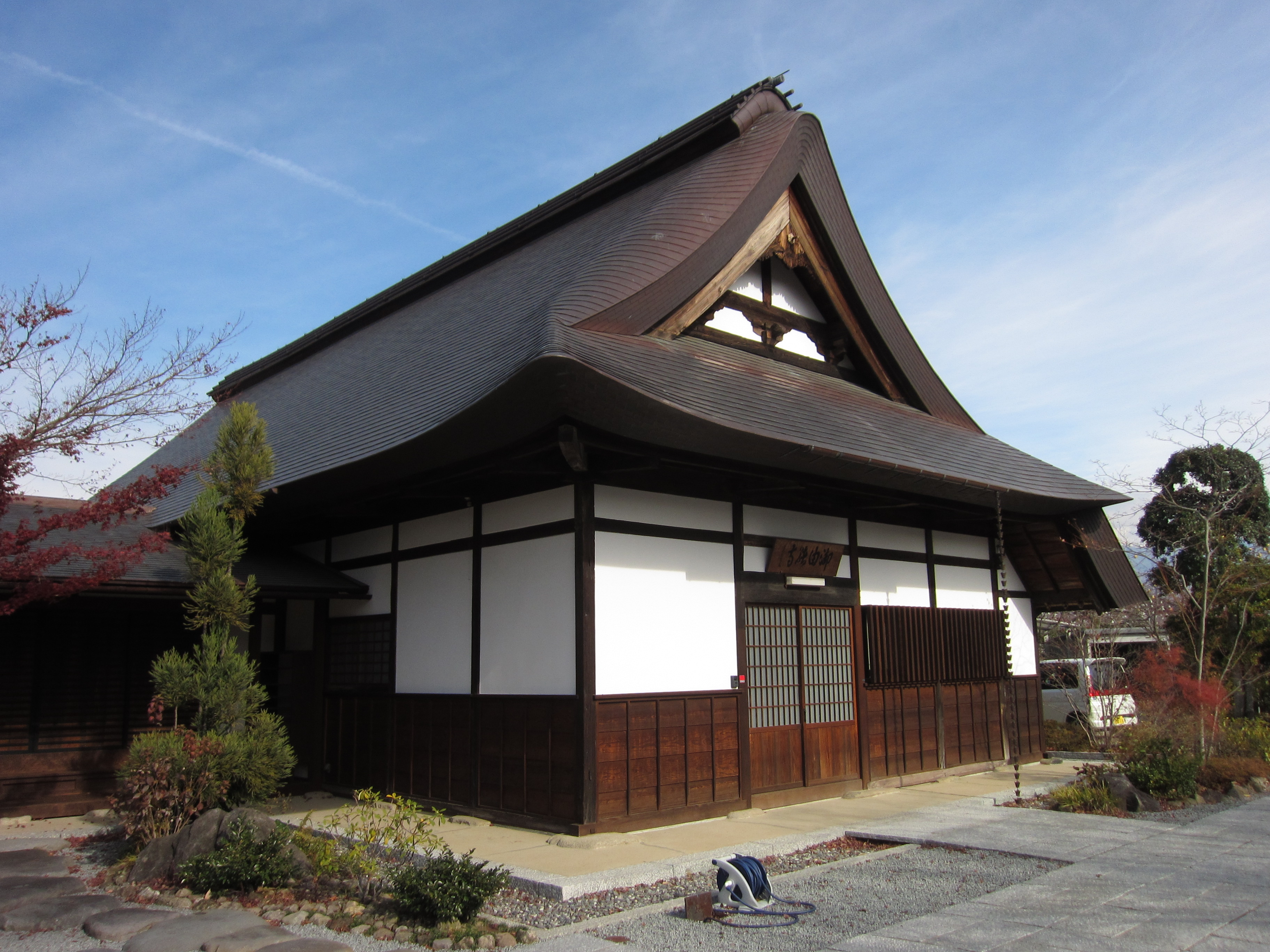
Kuri

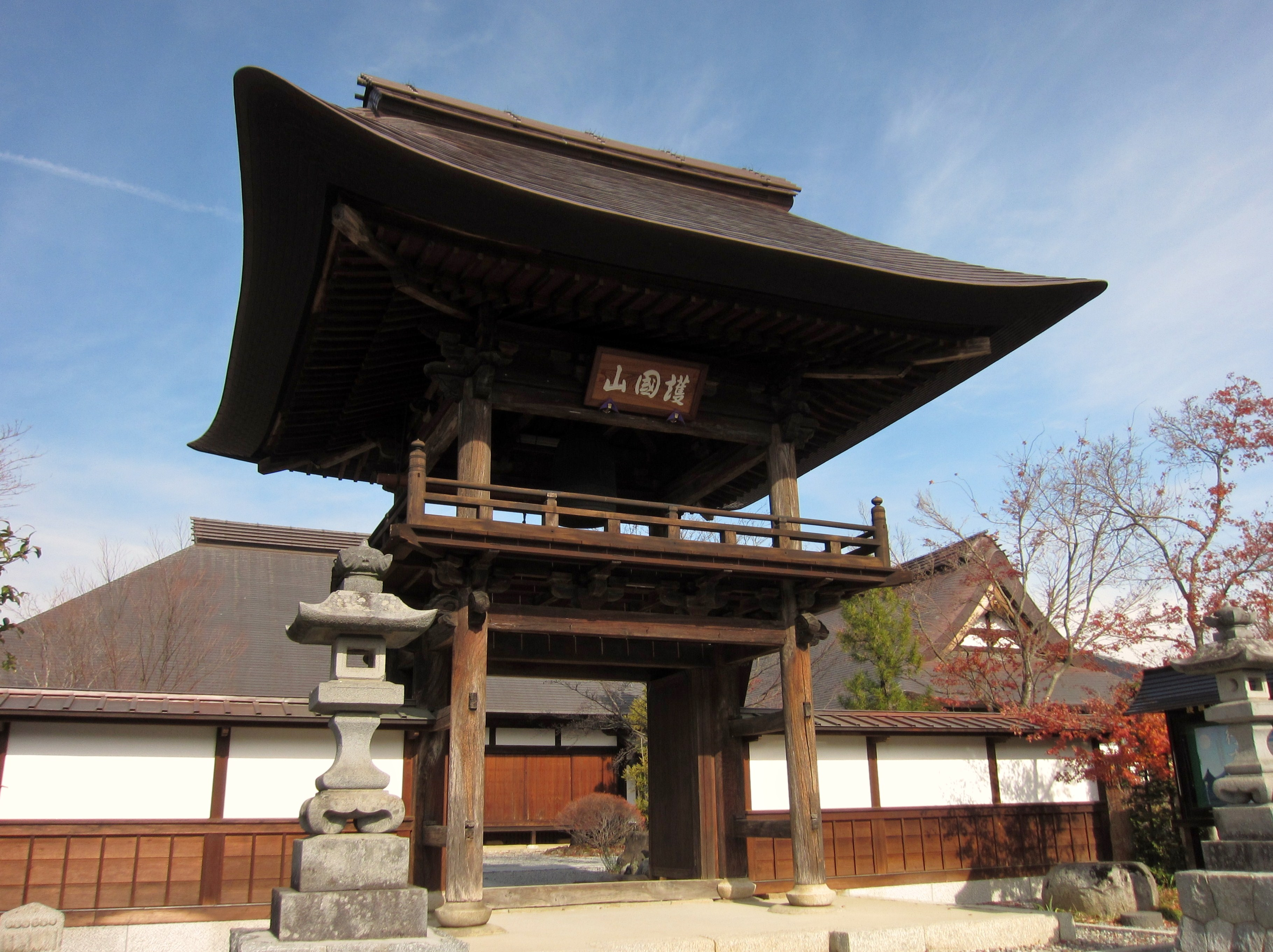
Rōmon

== Kai Kokubun-ji ruins ==
The Shoku Nihongi records that in 741 AD, as the country recovered from a major smallpox epidemic, Emperor Shōmu ordered that a monastery and nunnery be established in every province, the kokubunji (国分寺).

The area surrounding the ancient Kai Kokubun-ji ruins (35°38′17.44″N 138°41′00.83″E) contains the ruins of the provincial capital and the Ichinomiya Asama Shrine, the ichinomiya of Kai Province, and many late Kofun period burial mounds from the latter half of the 6th century to the 7th century. It is believed that the Otomo clan, who were the Kai Kuni no miyatsuko at the time, were involved in the construction. The exact date of the construction of the temple is uncertain, as it is mentioned in historical records only from 938 AD. It was destroyed by fire in 1225, and although rebuilt on a smaller scale, it never regained its former importance and was abandoned in the Muromachi period.

Per archaeological excavations, the original site extended from 250 meters east-to-west and 300 meters north-to-south, surrounded by an earthen rampart and moat. Within this compound, the layout of buildings was patterned after the temple of Daian-ji in Asuka, Nara, with a South Gate in line with the Kondō, with the two structures connected by a cloister. The pagoda was located on the right side of the courtyard thus formed, and the Lecture Hall (along with other supporting buildings) were located to the rear of the Kondō. Only 25 foundation stones were found at the Lecture Hall ruins, and only two foundation stones remain from the Kondō, but 14 large foundation stones remain from the pagoda ruins, and the corridor has left earthworks-like traces. The foundations for the pagoda indicate that it had a base 16.9 meters square and a probable height of 48 meters. Numerous Tenpyō period roof tiles were recovered from the site. One of the tile patterns is the "soben hachi" (leaf lotus flower pattern) on the eaves round tiles, and the "kinsei karakusa" (balanced arabesque pattern) on the eaves flat tiles. The same type of tiles were excavated from the Kamidoki kilns site (in Kōfu) located northwest of the Kai Kokubun-ji, as well as at the Kawada kiln located on the opposite bank of the Fuefuki River. As the early tiles of Kai Kokubun-ji are also found at the Teramoto temple ruins (in Fuefuki), which believed to be of Baekje origin, it is believed that Baekje immigrants were involved in the construction of both temples.

The temple was subsequently rebuilt by Takeda Shingen in the Sengoku period, but the restored temple was located 300 meters southwest of the original site. The original temple site is located approximately 15 minutes by car from Isawa-Onsen Station on the JR Tokai Chūō Main Line.

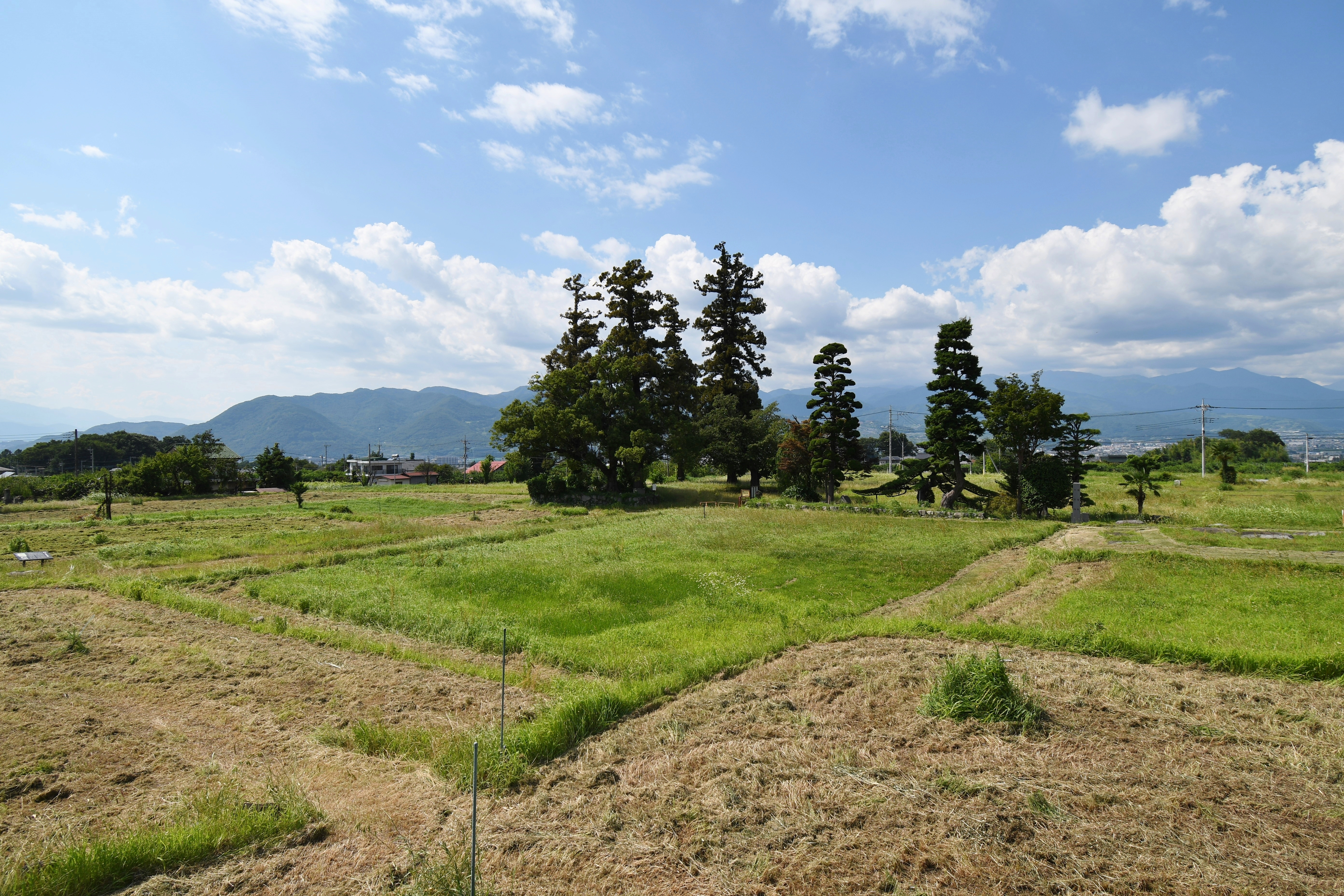
Panoramic view of precincts

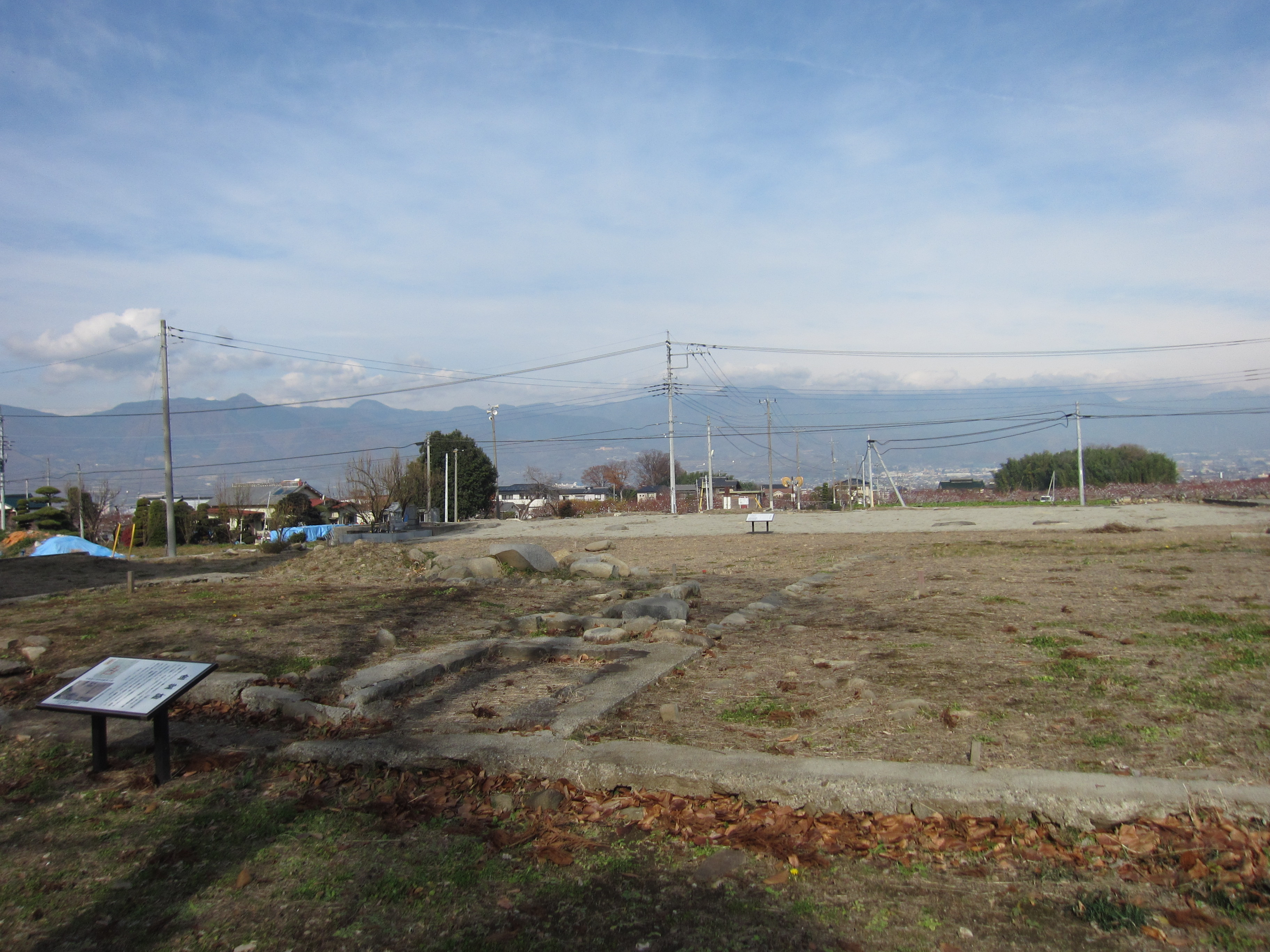
Site of the Kondō

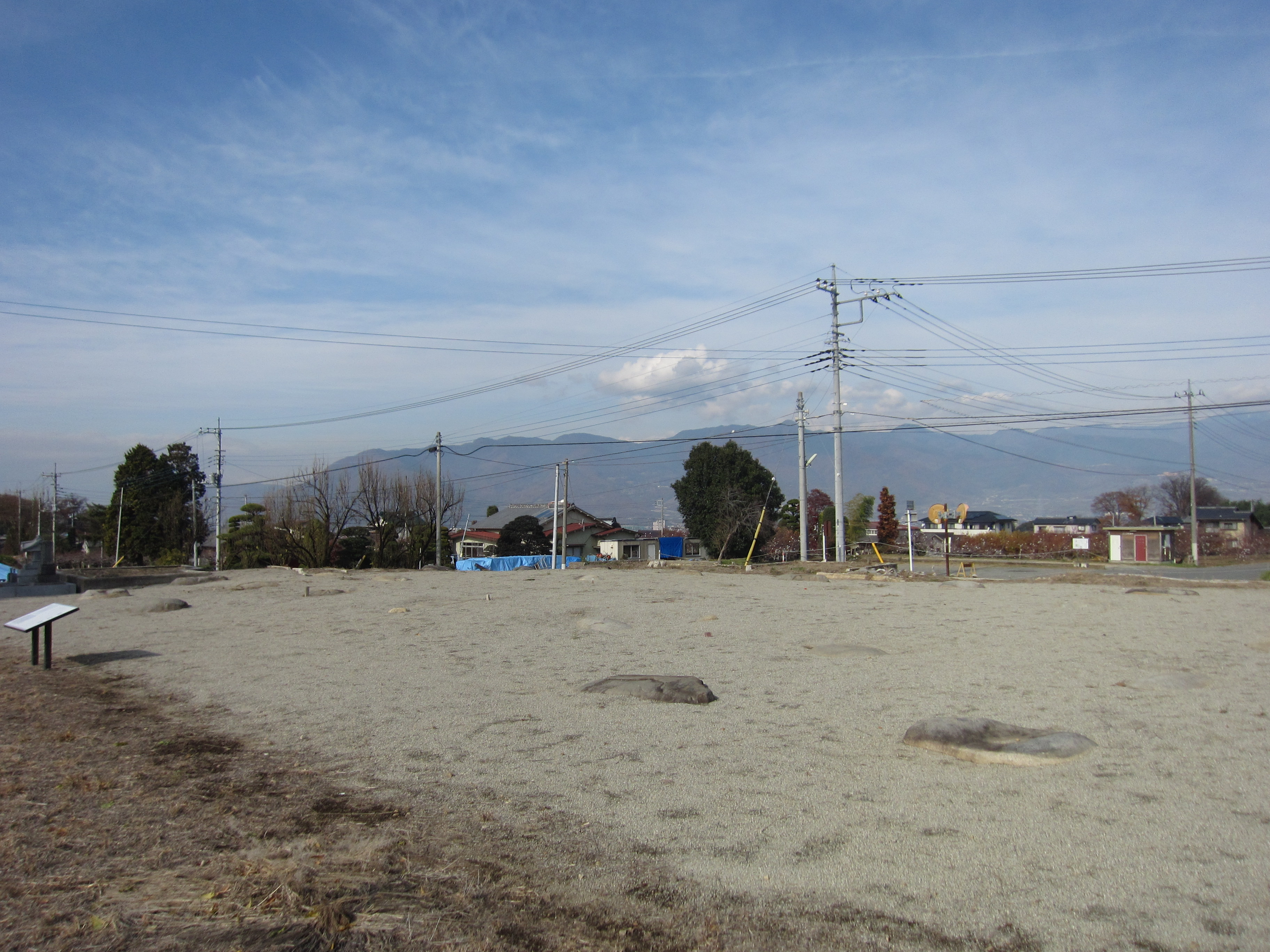
Site of the Lecture Hall

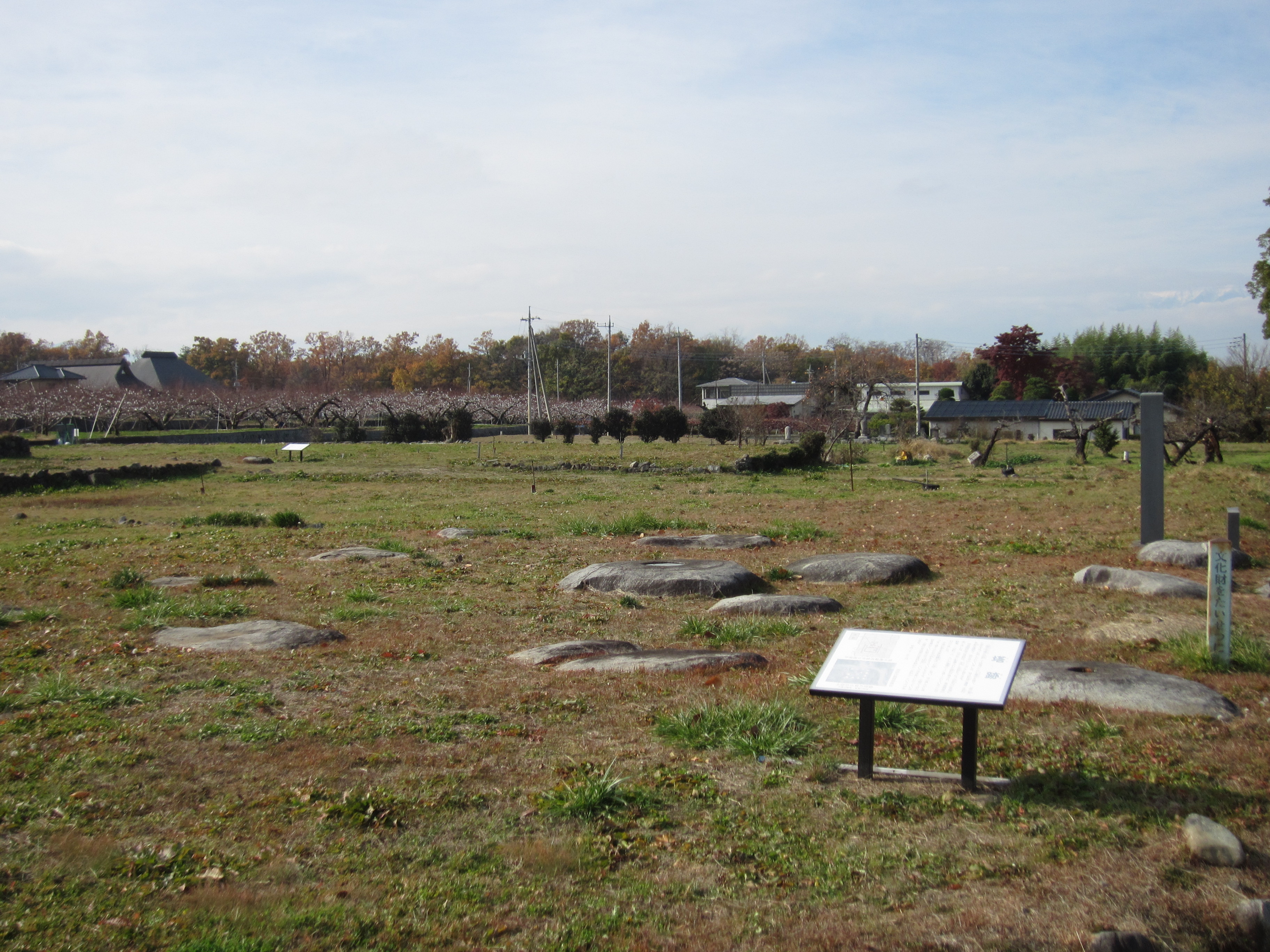
Site of the Pagoda

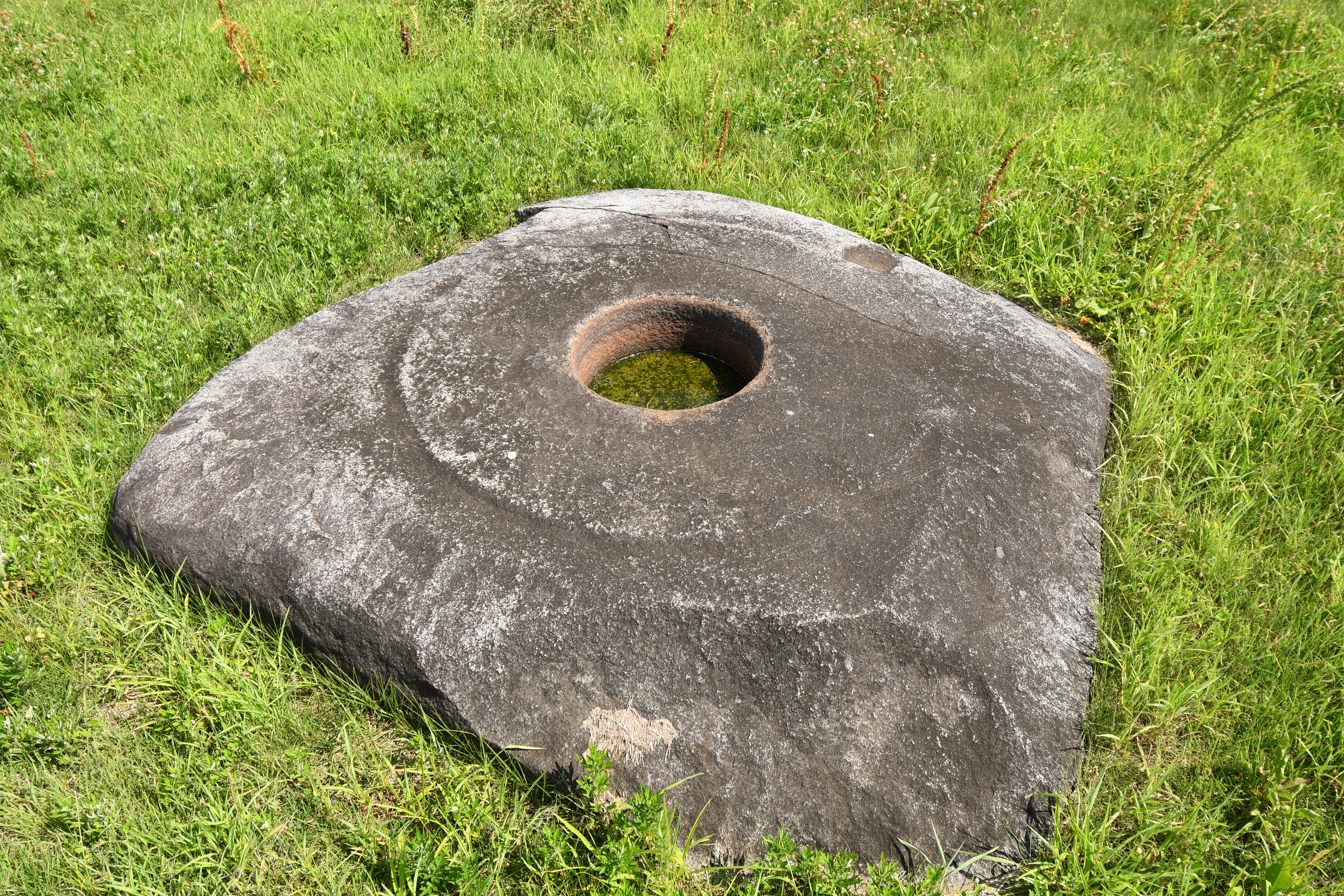
Pagoda center stone

== Kai Kokubun-niji ==
The site of the Nara period provincial nunnery are also located in this area, approximately 490 meters from the site of the Kai Kokubun-ji. (35°38′35.54″N 138°41′01.73″E)In the surroundings are numerous late Kofun period tumuli from the 6th and 7th centuries. Little is known of the nunnery's history, and the ruins were formerly identified as the site of a residence of the early Heian period wizard Abe no Seimei, with the Kai Kokubun-niji designation given to another set of temple ruins nearby. The precincts measure 180 meters square, and were surrounded by a moat and earthen rampart. As with the Kai Kokubun-ji, the layout consisted of a South Gate, Middle Gate, Cloister, Kondō, Lecture Hall and residence for the nuns. The Kondō was a five by four bay structure of which 18 foundation stones were found, and the Lecture Hall was also a five by four bay structure, of which 12 foundation stones were found. Sue ware pottery with an ink inscription "花寺" have been found. Similar shards have been found at the Kazusa Kokubunni-ji site and the ruins of Heijō-kyō, and the inscription is believed to be an abbreviation for the temple of Hokke-ji, the head temple in Nara of all of the provincial nunneries nationwide. The site was designated as a National Historic Site in 1949 with the area under protection expanded in 2001.

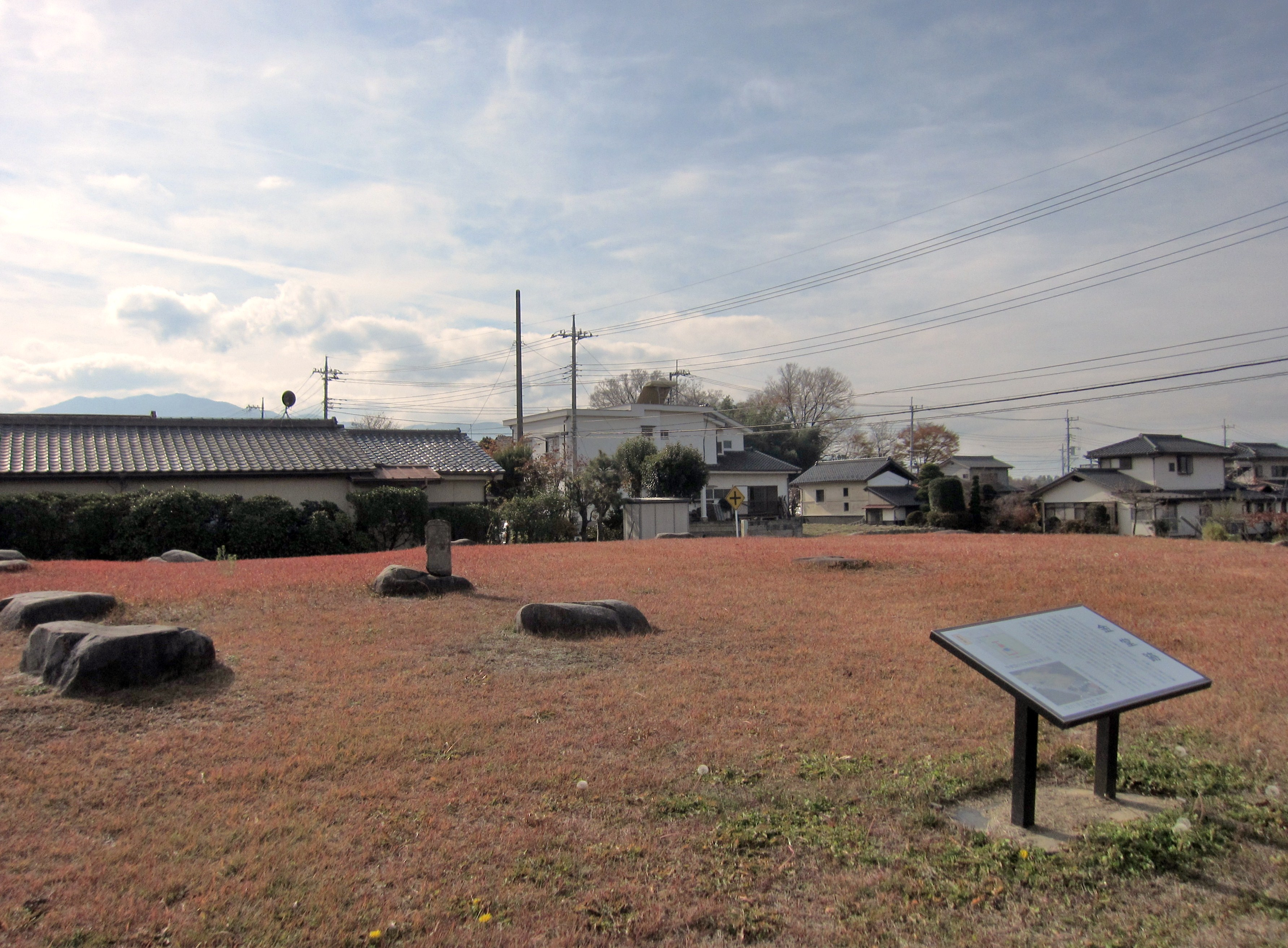
Site of the Kondō

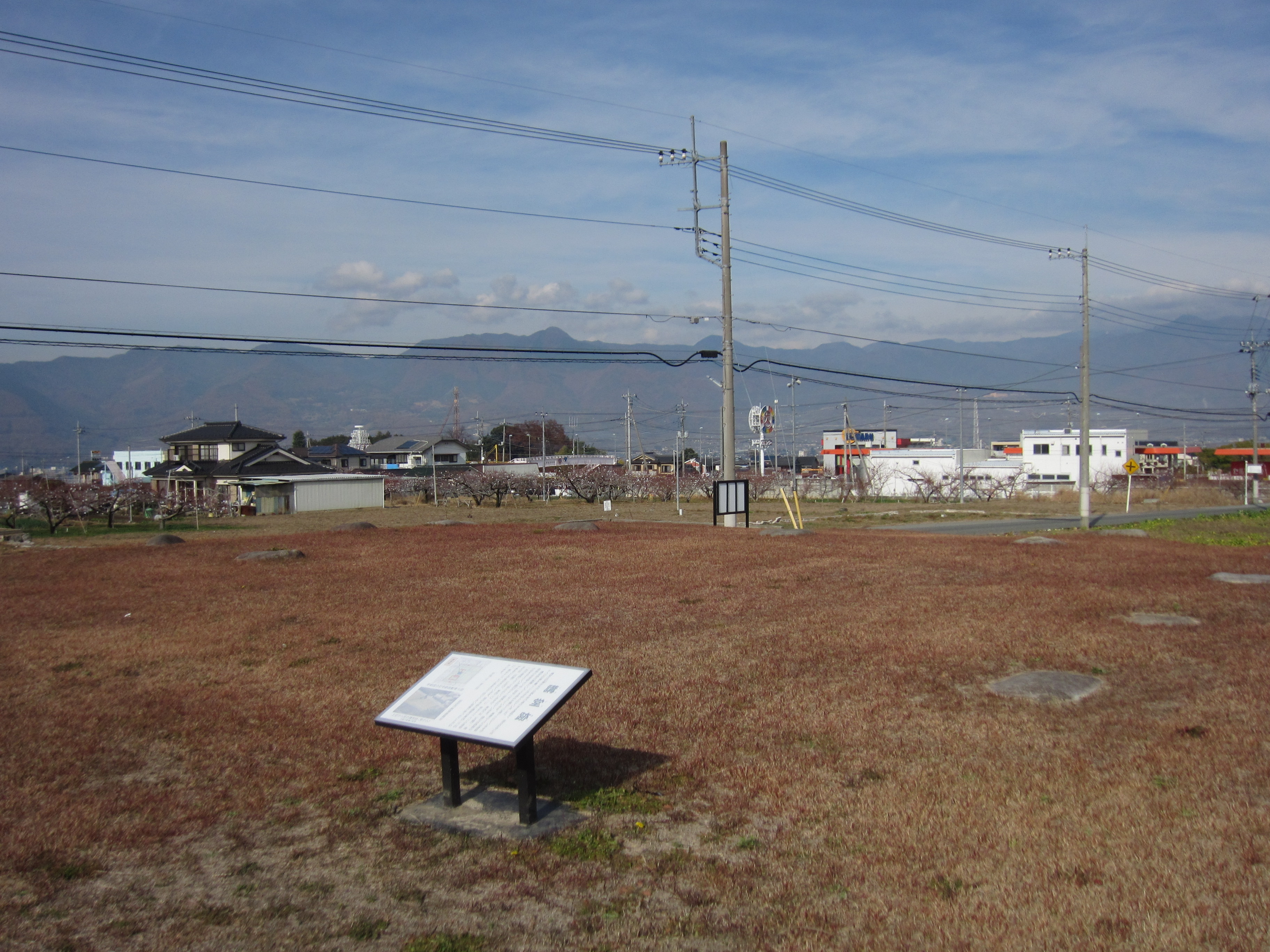
Site of the Lecture Hall

== See also ==
- List of Historic Sites of Japan (Yamanashi)
- provincial temple
