= Ichinomiya Asama Shrine (Fuefuki) =

Shintō shrine in Yamanashi Prefecture, Japan

Ichinomiya Asama Jinja 一宮浅間神社
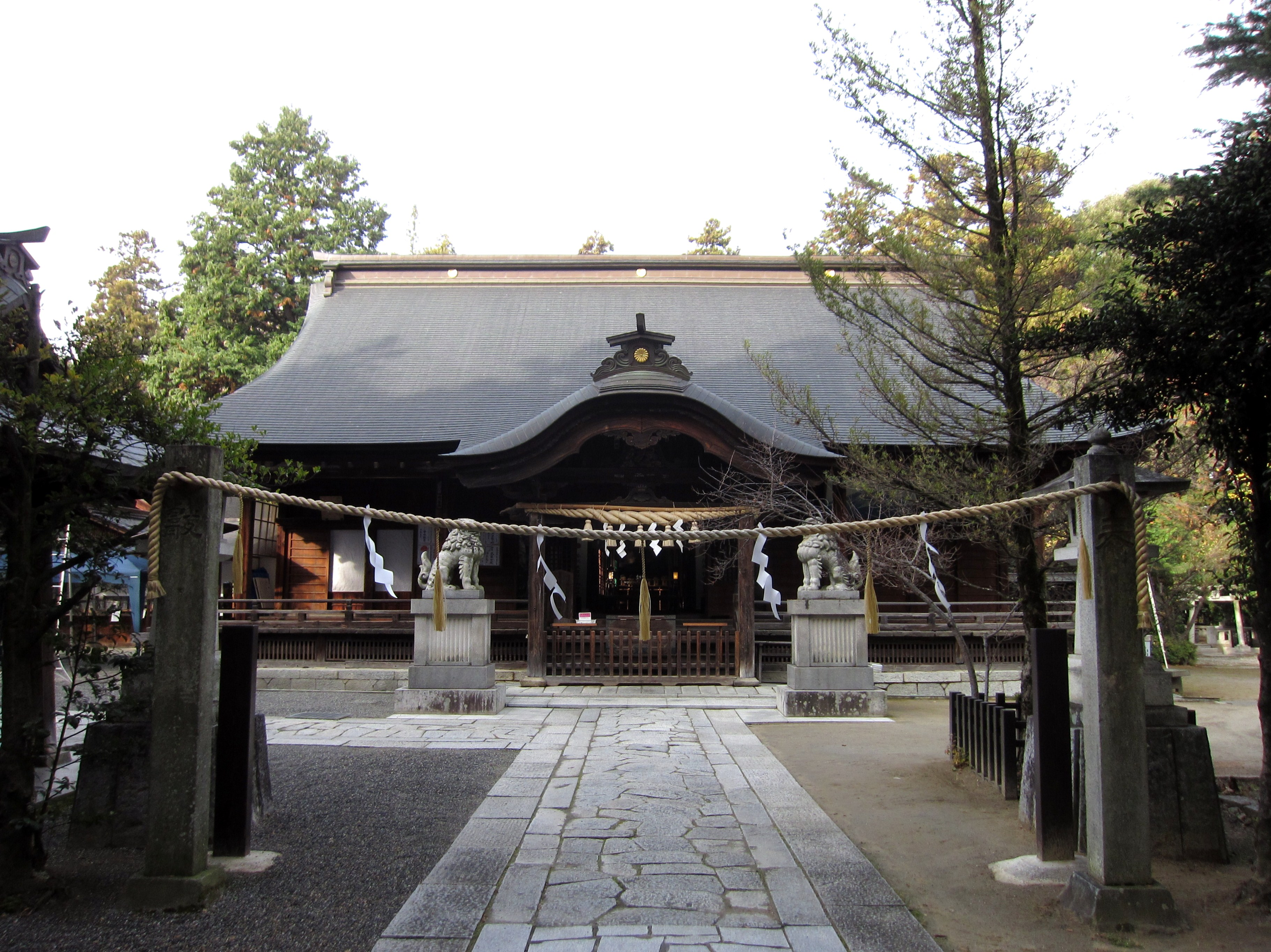
- Haiden of Ichinomiya Asama Jinja

- Location within Yamanashi Prefecture Location within Japan

Religion
- Affiliation: Shinto
- Deity: Konohanasakuya-hime
- Festival: April 15
- Type: Asama Shrine

Location
- Location: 1684 Ichinomiya-chō, Ichinomiya, Fuefuki-shi, Yamanashi-ken 405-0056
- Interactive map of Ichinomiya Asama Jinja 一宮浅間神社
- Coordinates: 35°38′51.93″N 138°41′50.79″E

Architecture
- Style: Nagare-zukuri
- Established: 865 AD

Website
- Official website

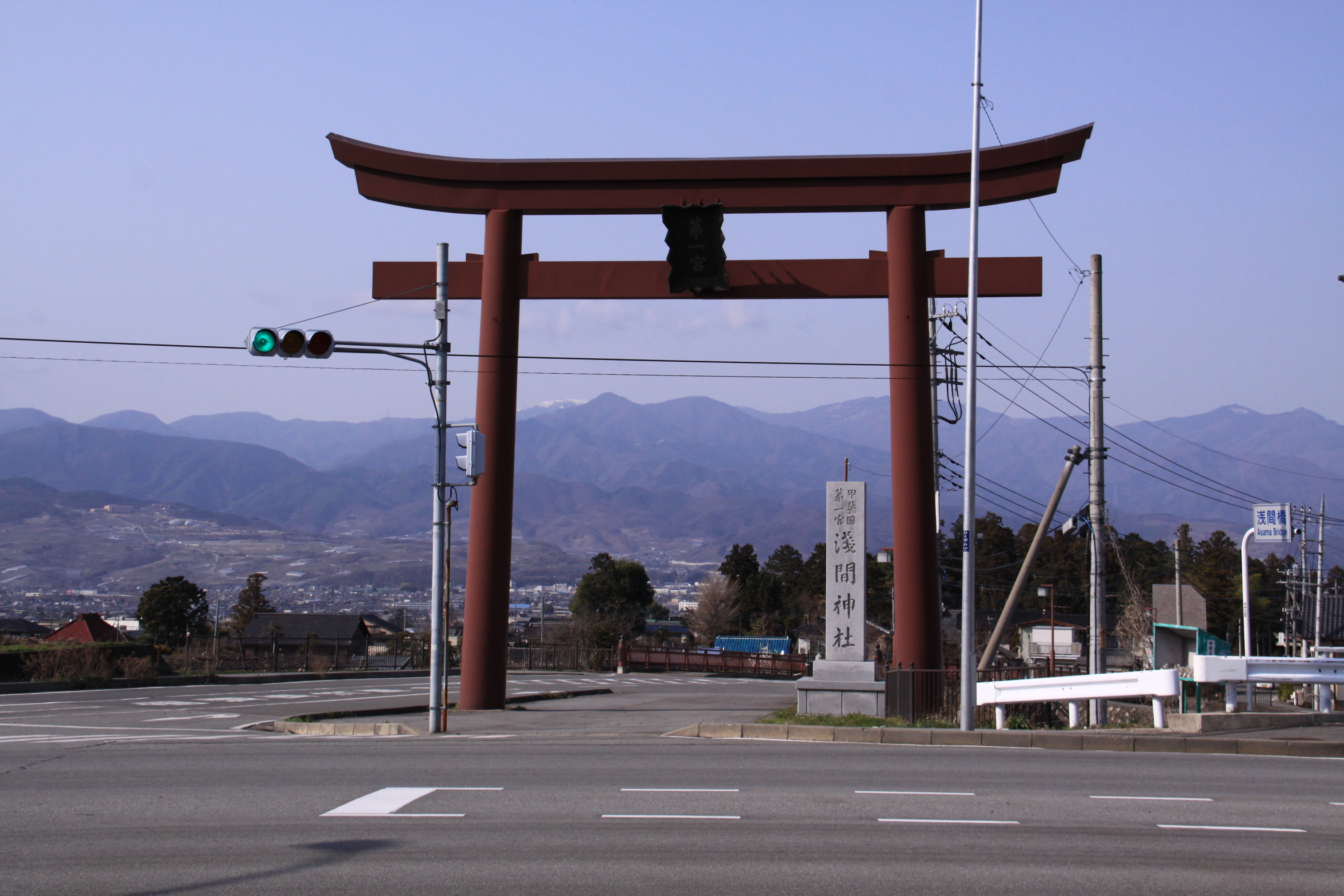
First Torii

The Ichinomiya Asama Jinja (一宮浅間神社) is a Shintō shrine in the Ichinomiya neighborhood of the city of Fuefuki in Yamanashi Prefecture, Japan. It is one of two shrines which vie for the total of ichinomiya of former Kai Province. The main festival of the shrine is held annually on April 15. It is also known as simply the Asama Jinja (浅間神社)

== Enshrined kami ==
- Konohanasakuya-hime (木花咲耶姫), the daughter of Ōyamatsu-no-mikoto (大山祇命). Mount Fuji was deified and its kami was named Asama no Okami (浅間大神), also known as Asama Daimyōjin (浅間大明神), Asama Gongen (浅間権現) or Sengen Daibōsatsu (浅間大菩薩), and is associated with Konohanasakuya-hime.

== History ==
The foundation of the Ichinomiya Asama Jinja predates the historical period. Per shrine tradition, it was established in reign of the semi-legendary Emperor Suinin (reigned 29 BC – 70 AD) with the shrine first built on its current location in 865 AD. Per the Nihon Sandai Jitsuroku, this was a period of intense volcanic activity on Mount Fuji, and the shrine was built in order to appease the kami of the mountain. The shrine is located near the site of the provincial temple of Kai Province, the Kai Kokubun-ji and the provincial capital during the Nara and Heian periods. The shrine is mentioned in the Engishiki records of 926 AD as a myōjin taisha (名神大社) and has been regarded as the ichinomiya of Kai Province since the end of the Heian period. Through the Sengoku period, the Takeda clan patronized of the shrine, and its extensive land holdings in central Kai Province were confirmed by Tokugawa Ieyasu after the start of the Tokugawa shogunate. The current Haiden of the shrine was built in 1672 and is a Tangible Culturalproperty of Fuefuki city. During the post-Meiji restoration system of State Shinto, the shrine was officially designated a National Shrine, 2nd rank (国幣中社kokuhei-chūsha), in the Modern system of ranked Shinto shrines.

The shrine is a 60-minute walk (or 10-minute car ride) from Yamanashishi Station on the JR East Chūō Main Line.

== Gallery ==
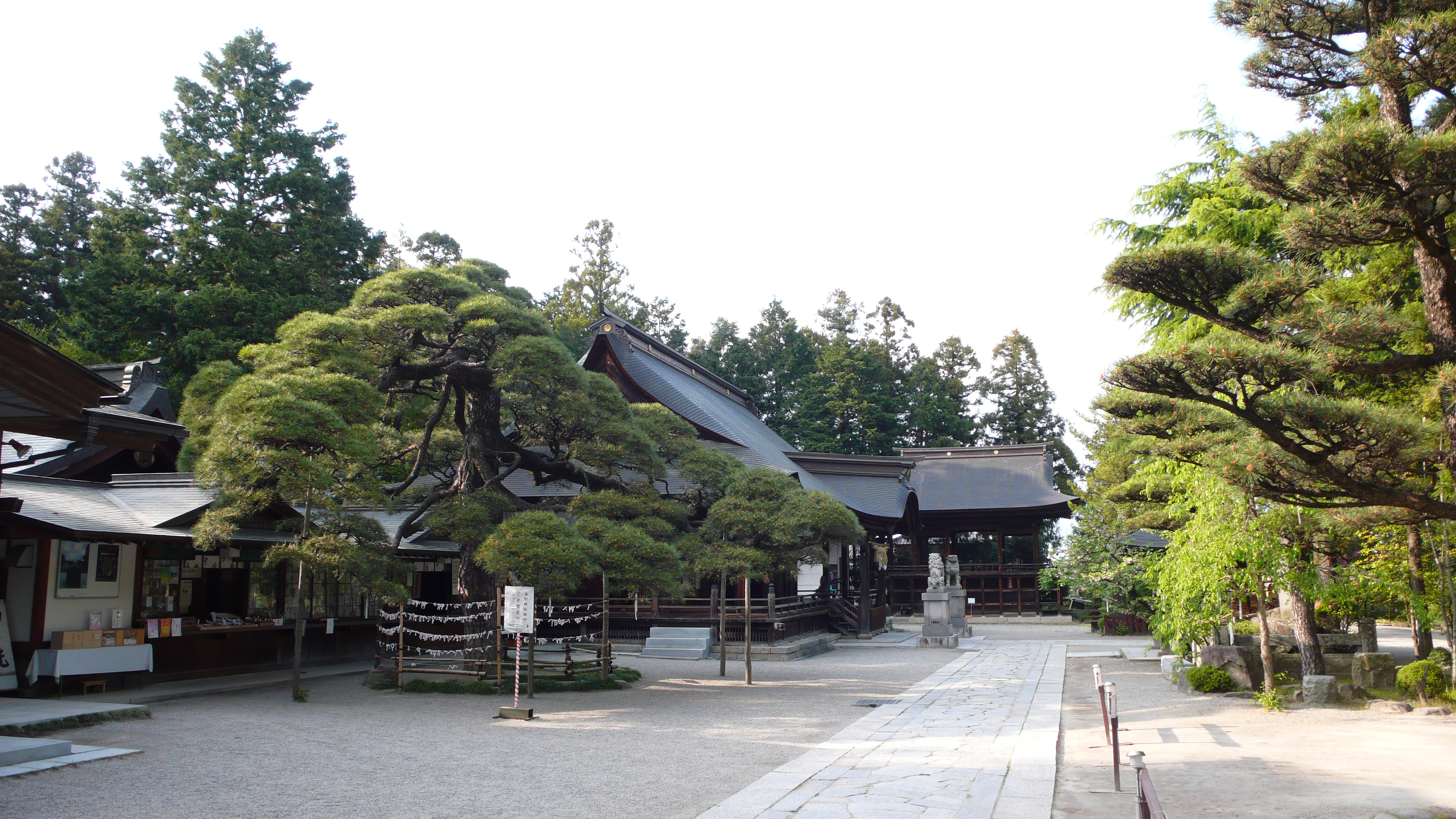
Precincts

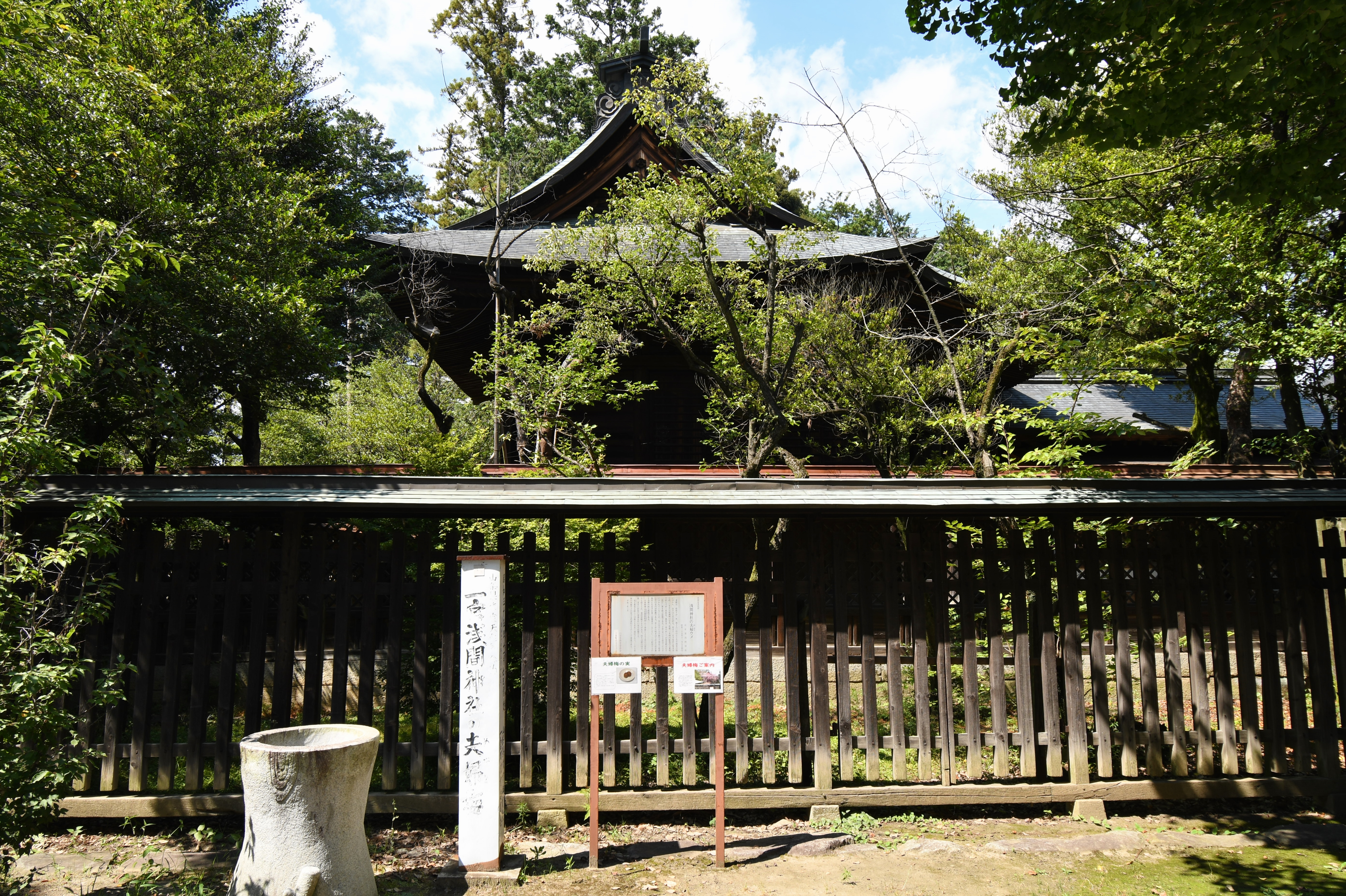
Honden and "Meoto-ume"

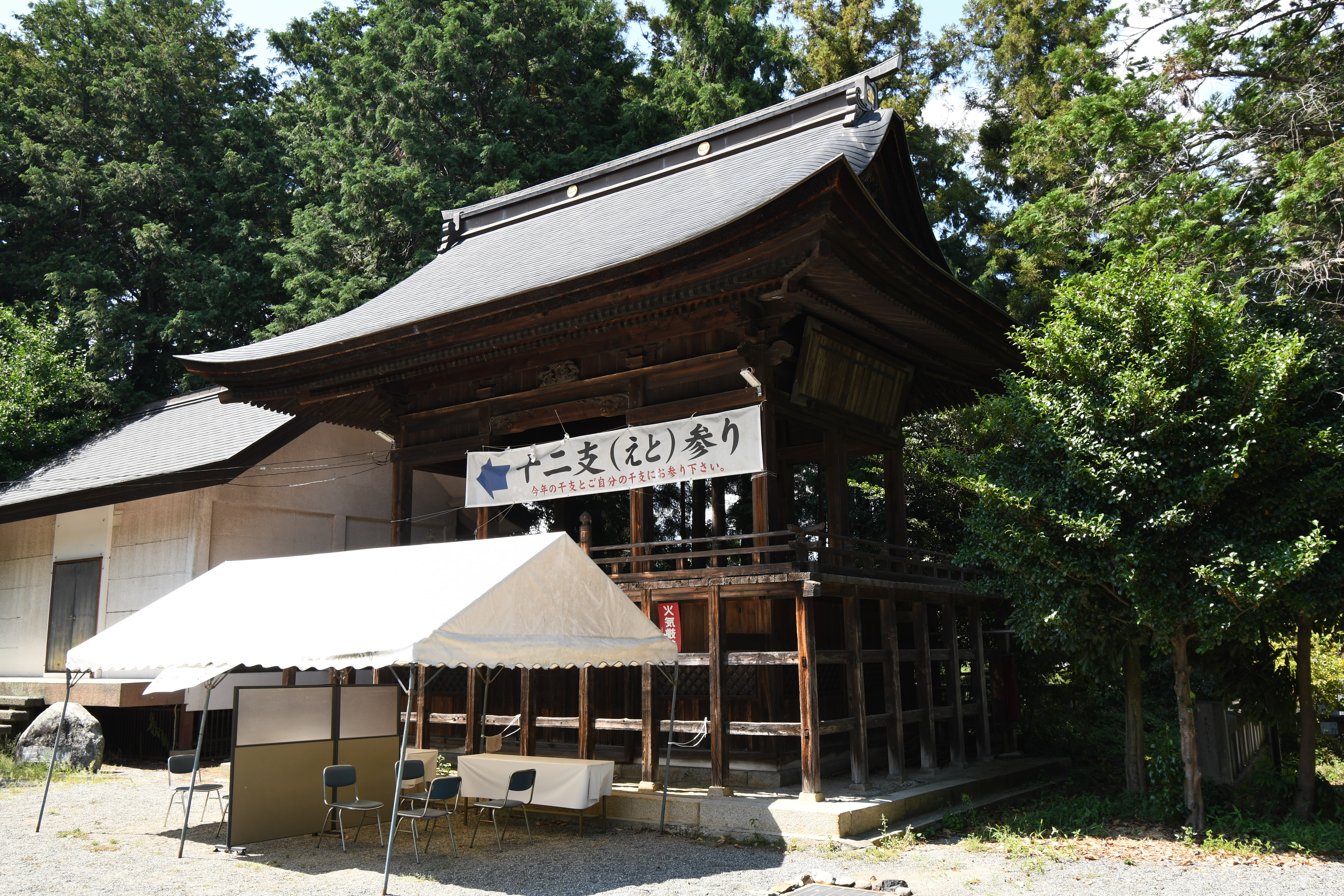
Kagura-den

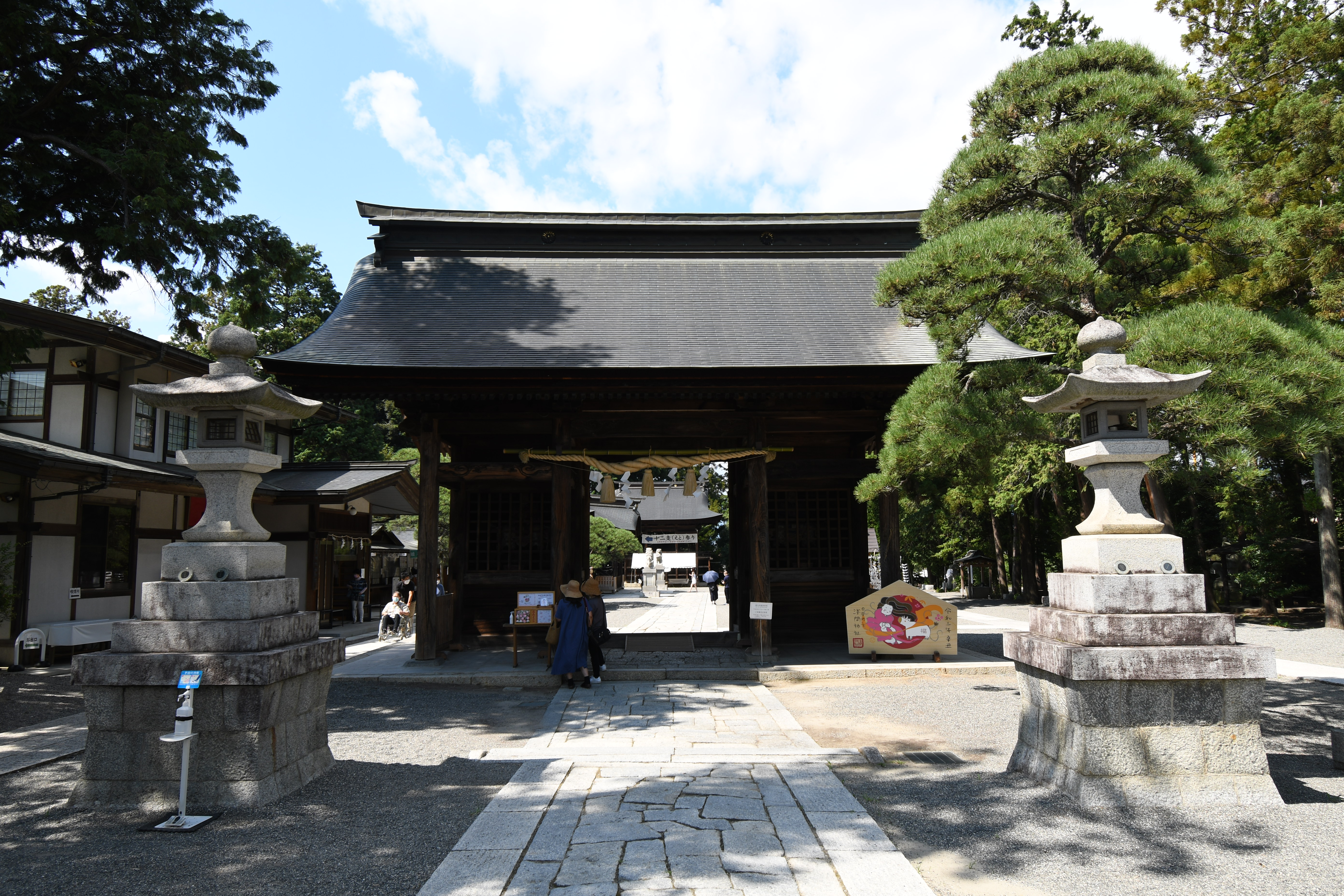
Gate

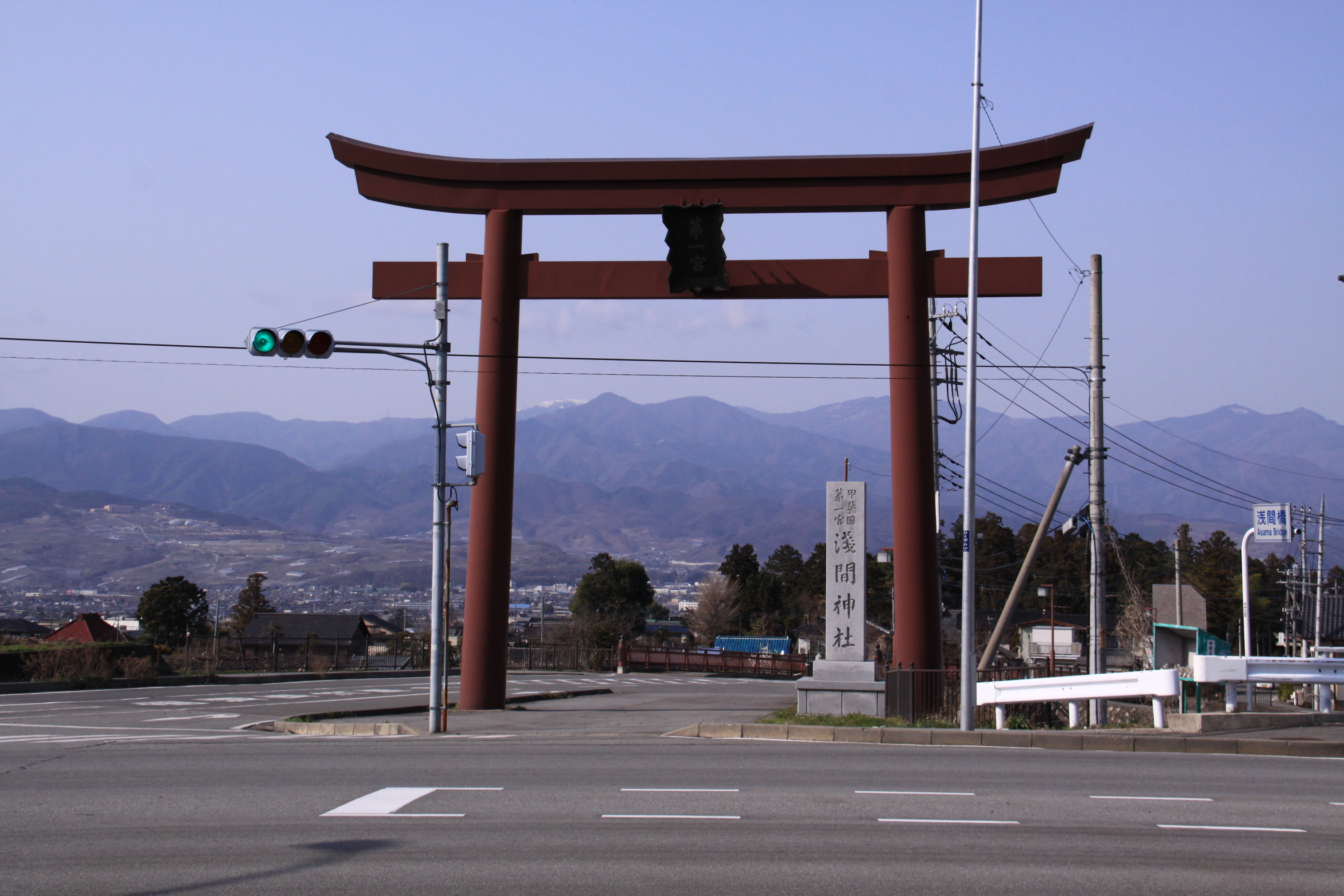
Ichi-no-Torii

== Cultural Properties ==
=== Important Cultural Properties ===
- Heart Sutra (般若心経), Sengoku period. In 1541, Emperor Go-Nara planned to dedicate a copy of the Heart Sutra to each ichinomiya in the country to pray for peace. The dedication was actually carried out in 24 countries, of which seven copies are known to still exist. The one at the Asama Jinja was brought to this shrine in 1550, and was dedicated Takeda Shingen. It was designated an Important Cultural Property in 1905.
- Honden of Yamamiya Jinja (山宮神社本殿), late Muromachi period. The Yamamiya Jinja is a subsidiary shrine located some distance outside the main shrine compound. The Honden of this shrine was constructed in 1558 and was designated an Important Cultural Property in 1907.

=== Yamanashi Prefecture Designated Tangible Cultural Properties ===
- Tachi sword (太刀 銘国次), Muromachi period. Inscribed: Kunitsugu. Length: 104.0 cm, Curvature: 4.5 cm. According to shrine legend, this sword was donated by Takeda Shingen and was known as Yamashiro Kunirai Kunitsugu's sword. Kunitsugu, lived in Seki, Mino Province, around the time of the Kansho and Eisho periods.

== See also ==
- List of Shinto shrines
- Ichinomiya
- Asama Shrine
- Ichinomiya Sengen Jinja
